= Timeline of Venice =

Coordinates: 45.4375°N 12.335833°E

The following is a timeline of the history of the city of Venice, Veneto, Italy.

== Prior to 19th century ==
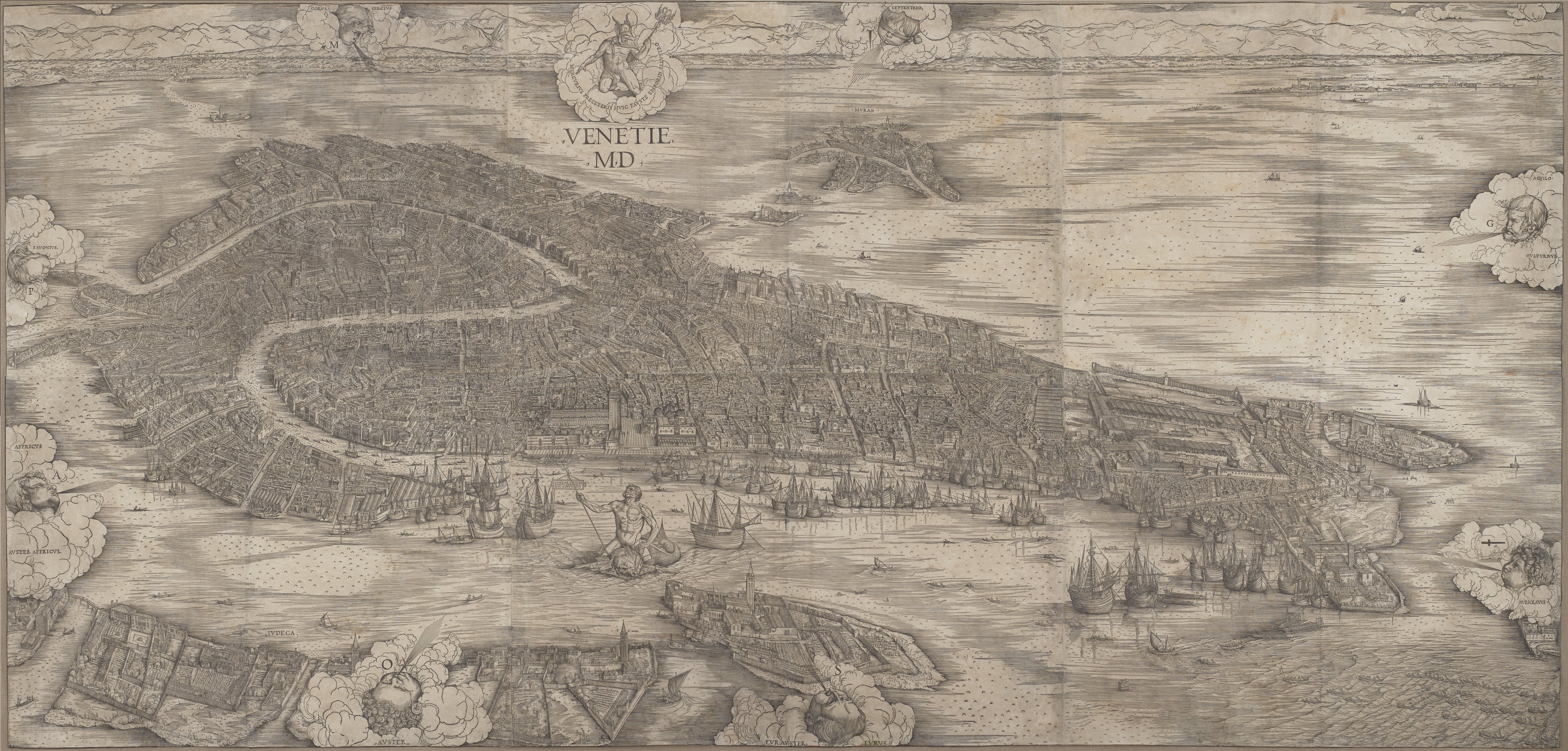
Jacopo de' Barbari's woodcut, the View of Venice, 1500

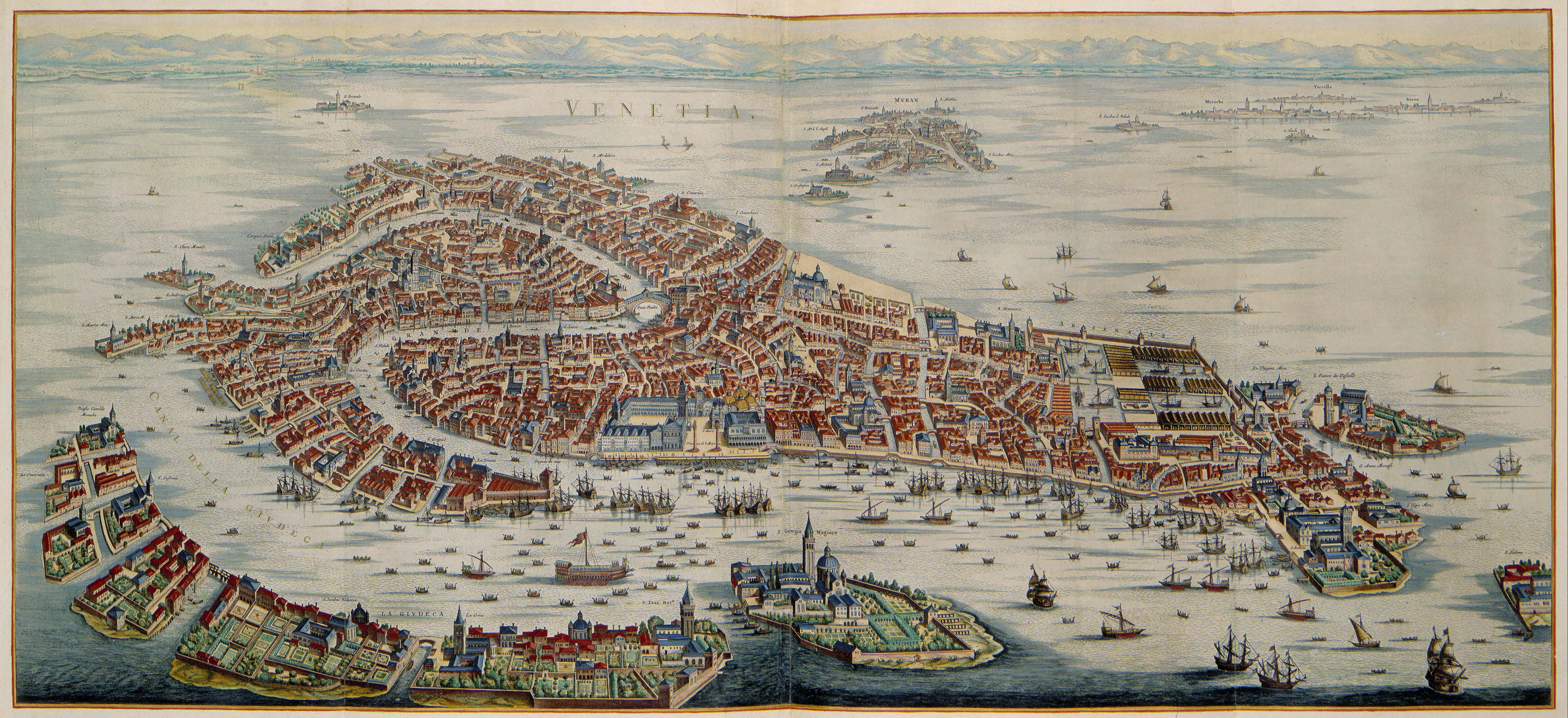
Venice in the late 17th and early 18th centuries

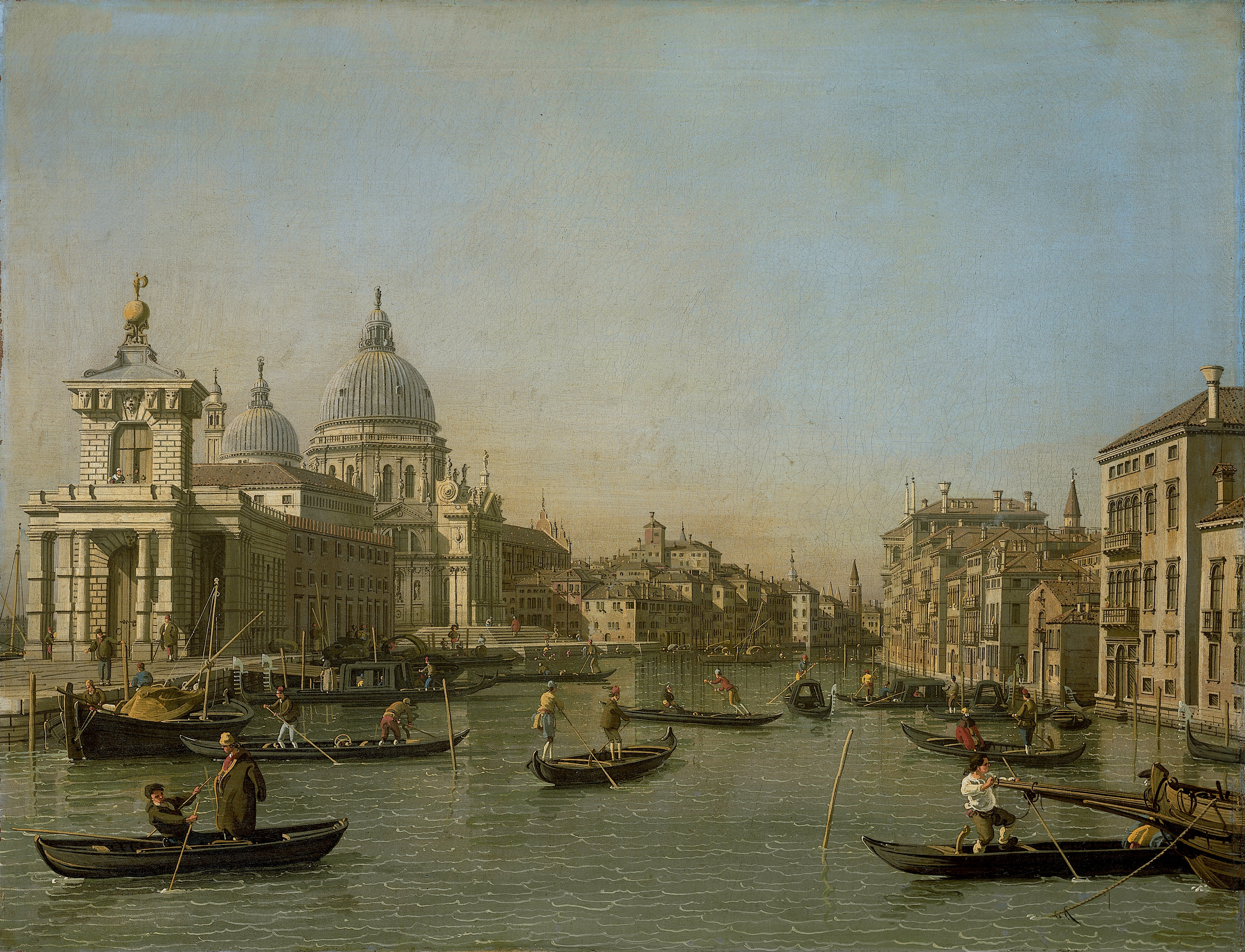
The Grand Canal in Venice, c. 1730

- 421 CE
  - According to much later traditions, the city of Venice is founded on 25 March (421), by consecration of the church of San Giacomo di Rialto, and the establishment of urban trading-posts on the islands of the Rialto. Such accounts are found in some medieval chronicles, but not accepted by modern scholars, since settlements on Rialto were fully urbanized much later and transformed into Venice proper only since the first half of the 9th century.
  - First mention of Poveglia.
- 452 – Traditional date for the adoption of a "consular government" in Venice. Not accepted by modern scholars.
- 554 – The Gothic War ends with Byzantine victory. Entire Italy is again under imperial rule, and governed as the Praetorian prefecture of Italy, that includes the province of Venetia et Histria, centered in Aquileia.
- 568 – Lombards invade Italy, and conquer Aquileia. Byzantine province of Venetia is reduced to coastal regions, and its administrative center is moved to Oderzo, while ecclesiastical center is moved from Aquileia to Grado.
- 584 – The remaining Byzantine territories of the Praetorian prefecture of Italy are reorganized into the Exarchate of Ravenna, that also includes the remnants of Byzantine Venetia.
- 639 – Byzantine Venetia is governed by magister militum Mauricius.
- 697 – Traditional date for Paolo Lucio Anafesto becoming the first Doge of Venice. Such accounts are not accepted by modern scholars.
- 712 – King Liutprand (712-744) ascends the Lombard throne. During his reign, Ravenna is occupied by the Lombards for the first time, but soon recaptured by the Byzantines. The Terminatio Liutprandina regulates borders between Lombard and Byzantine possessions at Cittanova. Byzantine Venetia is governed by magister militum Marcellus.
- 726 - Byzantine emperor Leo III inaugurates iconoclastic religious policies, provoking resistance throughout Byzantine Italy, including the remnants of Byzantine Venetia. Orso Ipato is elected as doge, by traditional accounts, that are accepted in principle by modern scholars, but not in all details.
- 751 - Fall of Ravenna to the Lombards marks the end of the Exarchate of Ravenna and weakens Byzantine rule over the Venetian Lagoon.
- 774 – Catholic diocese established on Olivolo, comprising Dorsoduro, Luprio, and Rialto.
- 810 - King Pepin of Italy invades the Venetian Lagoon, but fails to capture the region.
- 812 - The Treaty of Aachen is concluded between Byzantines and Franks, and ratified by the Treaty of Ratisbon (814). Venetian and Dalmatian cities remain under Byzantine suzerainty. Rialto comes to prominence over other settlements in the Lagoon, thus gradually becoming the Venice proper, as the new seat of the doge Agnello Participazio.
- 828 – Mark the Evangelist designated patron saint of city.
- 836 – Doge's Chapel built.
- 902 – St Mark's Campanile construction begins.
- 1094 – St Mark's Basilica consecrated.
- 1097 – Market established on Rialto.
- 1116 – The settlement of Malamocco on the Lido is submerged as a result of an exceptional storm surge.
- 1131 – Church of San Clemente is the first established settlement on the Isola di San Clemente.
- 1157 – Bank established.
- 1173 – Rialto Bridge made of wood opened, designed by Nicolò Barattieri.
- 1202 – Fourth Crusade embarks from Venice.
- 1204 – After the Sack of Constantinople, various monuments and works of art are transported to Venice.
- 1228 – Fondaco dei Tedeschi built.
- 1264 – Bridge built across Grand Canal.
- 1291 – Glassmakers relocate to Murano.
- 1297 – Serrata del Maggior Consiglio: exclusion of the lower classes from power and establishment of the patrician-led aristocratic regime.
- 1310 – Tiepolo conspiracy fails to gain power
- 1333 – Botanical garden planted.
- 1348 – Plague.
- 1360 – Ponte della Paglia (bridge) built (approximate date).
- 1386 – Jewish burial ground granted on the Lido.
- 1394 – Public clock installed.
- 1423
  - Lazaretto (quarantine) established on the island of Lazzaretto Vecchio.
  - Francesco Foscari becomes doge.
- 1430 – Santi Giovanni e Paolo church rebuilt.
- 1447 – Scuola degli Albanesi founded.
- 1469 – Printing press in operation.
- 1475 – De honesta voluptate et valetudine cookbook published.
- 1495 – Printer Aldus Manutius in business.
- 1500 – Jacopo de' Barbari's woodcut View of Venice is published
- 1501 – Petrucci's Harmonice Musices Odhecaton (songbook) published.
- 1507 – Cinque Savi alla Mercanzia (trade board) established.
- 1514 – Fire on Rialto.
- 1516 – Jewish ghetto in Cannaregio established.
- 1520 – Palazzo dei Dieci Savi built.
- 1527 – Jacopo Sansovino "appointed public architect."
- 1541 – Sempiterni compagnie founded.
- 1548 – Population: 158,069.
- 1558 – Establishment of a permanent postal connection between Venice and Kraków, capital of the Kingdom of Poland.
- 1565 – Theatre built.
- 1569 – 13 September: Arsenal explodes.
- 1575 – Fondaco dei Turchi established.
- 1575–77 – Plague.
- 1587 – Banco della Piazza di Rialto opens.
- 1591 – Rialto Bridge built of stone.
- 1600 – Bridge of Sighs built.
- 1613 – Monteverdi becomes maestro di cappella of St Mark's Basilica.
- 1630
  - 1629–1631 Italian plague strikes Venice.
  - Accademia degli Incogniti founded.
- 1637 – Teatro San Cassiano (opera house) opens.
- 1642 – Premiere of Monteverdi's opera L'incoronazione di Poppea.
- 1645 – Coffee house in business.
- 1649 – Premiere of Cavalli's opera Giasone.
- 1678 – Italian Baroque composer Antonio Vivaldi is born on 4 March.
- 1682 – Dogana built.
- 1706 – Population: 140,256.
- 1720 – Vezzi porcelain begins
- 1720 – Caffè Florian in business.
- 1741 – Il Nuovo Postiglione newspaper begins publication.
- 1744 – Joseph Smith becomes British consul.
- 1750 – Accademia di Belle Arti di Venezia founded.
- 1755 – Teatro San Benedetto (theatre) opens.
- 1761 – Gozzi's L'Osservatore Veneto begins publication.
- 1764 – Cozzi porcelain begins
- 1778 – Notizie del mondo newspaper begins publication.
- 1785 – Population: 139,095.
- 1792 – La Fenice opera house built.
- 1797 – Fall of the Republic of Venice and establishment of the Provisional Municipality of Venice
- 1798 – Venice passes into Austrian hands.

== 19th century ==
- 1805 – French in power per Peace of Pressburg.
- 1812 – Ateneo Veneto founded.
- 1814
  - Austrians in power again.
  - Ala Napoleonica section of Piazza San Marco built.
- 1815 – General Archive of Veneto established.
- 1830
  - City becomes a free port.
  - Museo Correr (museum) established.
- 1842 – Milan–Venice railway begins operating; Venezia Mestre railway station opens.
- 1844
  - Premiere of Verdi's opera Ernani.
  - Mental asylum established on Isola di San Clemente.
- 1848
  - March: Republic of San Marco established.
  - 27 October: Battle of Mestre.
- 1853 – Premiere of Verdi's opera La Traviata.
- 1854 – November: Ponte dell'Accademia built.
- 1857 – Population: 118,173.
- 1859 – Venice becomes part of the Italian confederation of Austria, per Treaty of Villafranca.
- 1861 – Venezia Santa Lucia railway station opens.
- 1866 – Venice becomes part of the Kingdom of Italy per Treaty of Vienna (1866).
- 1868 – August: Regia Scuola Superiore di Commercio (business school) established.
- 1870 – Artificial creation of the island of Sacca Sessola completed.
- 1871 – Population: 128,901.
- 1876
  - Liceo e Società Musicale Benedetto Marcello established.
  - L'Adriatico newspaper begins publication.
- 1880 – 16 June: John Cross, on honeymoon with English novelist George Eliot, jumps from their hotel room into the Grand Canal in an episode of mental disorder.
- 1881 – Population: 132,826.
- 1883
  - Lido and Malamocco annexed to city.
  - 13 February: German composer Richard Wagner dies at Ca' Vendramin Calergi of a heart attack, age 69.
- 1887 – March: Il Gazzettino newspaper begins publication.
- 1889 – 12 December: English poet Robert Browning dies at his son's home Ca' Rezzonico, age 77.
- 1892 – Conversion of Sacca Sessola into a hospital for contagious diseases is begun.
- 1895 – 30 April: Venice Biennale begins.
- 1897 – Population: 155,899.

== 20th century ==
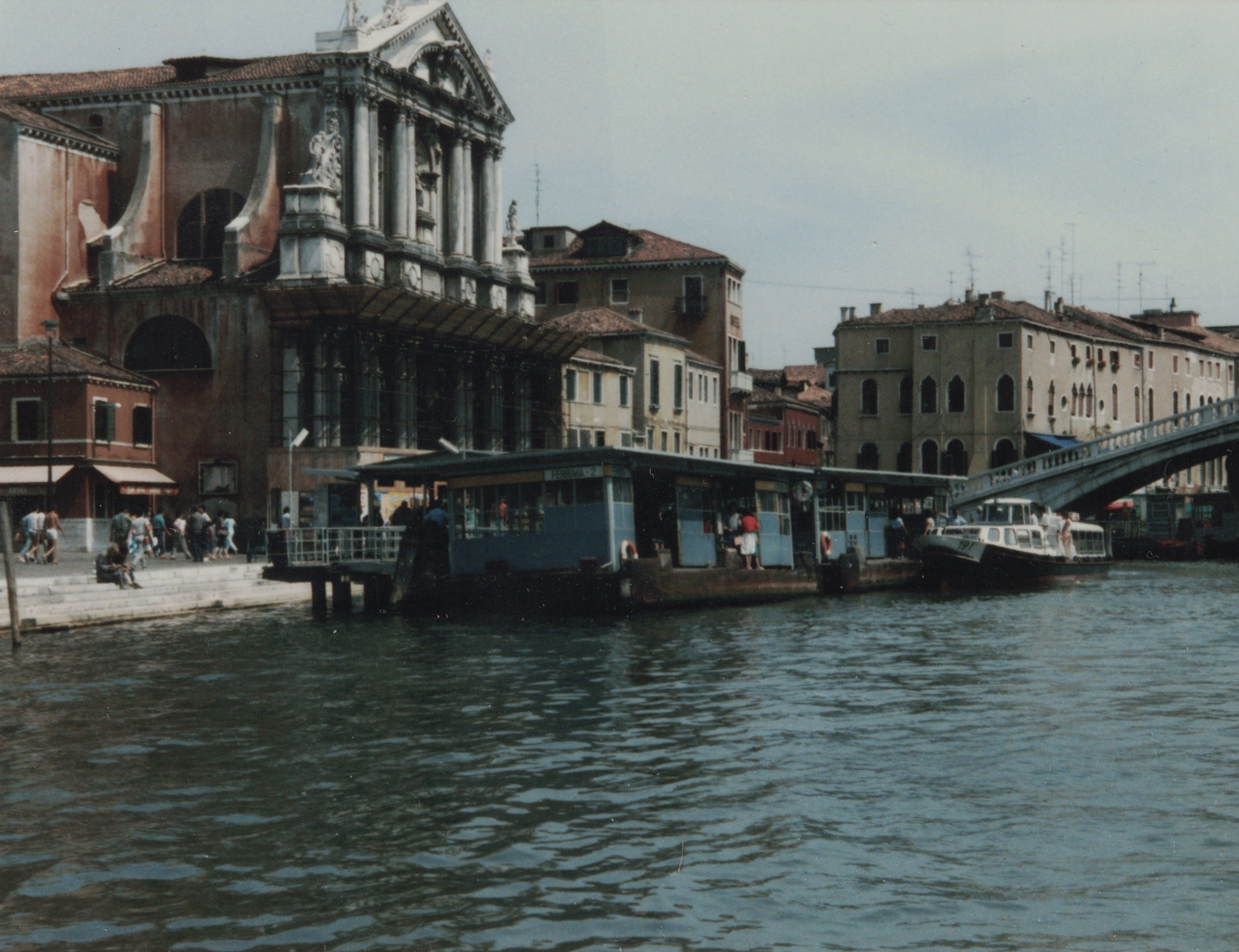
Venice in 1985.

- 1906 – Population: 169,563.
- 1907 – 14 December: Venezia FC (football club) formed.
- 1910 – 27 April: Futurist poet Filippo Tommaso Marinetti issues the manifesto Contro Venezia passatista ("Against Past-loving Venice") in the Piazza San Marco.
- 1913 – Stadio Pier Luigi Penzo (stadium) opens.
- 1917 – Marghera becomes part of Venice.
- 1922 – Mental asylum established on Poveglia.
- 1923 – Pellestrina becomes part of Venice.
- 1924 – Burano, Ca'Savio, and Murano become part of Venice.
- 1926
  - Chirignago, Favaro, Malcontenta, Mestre, and Zelarino become part of Venice.
  - Nicelli Airport begins operating.
- 1927 – AC Mestre football club formed.
- 1929 – 19 August: Russian-born ballet impresario Sergei Diaghilev dies in Venice and is buried on the Isola di San Michele.
- 1931 – Harry's Bar in business.
- 1932 – 6 August: Venice Film Festival begins.
- 1933 – Ponte della Libertà (bridge) opens.
- 1937 – Collegio Navale della Gioventù Italiana del Littorio (naval school) established.
- 1940 – Università Iuav di Venezia (architecture institute) founded.
- 1945 – 21 March: Operation Bowler.
- 1949 – Cinema Teatro Corso built in Mestre.
- 1956 – 29 and 30 May: Venice Conference.
- 1958 – Belmond Hotel Cipriani in business.
- 1966 – 4 November: 1966 Venice flood: highest acqua alta.
- 1970 – Veneto regional administration implemented.
- 1972 – 1 November: American poet Ezra Pound dies in the Civil Hospital and is buried on the Isola di San Michele.
- 1978 – Società Filologica Veneta founded.
- 1980 – June: 6th G7 summit held.
- 1981 – May: Venice hosts the 1981 European Karate Championships.
- 1987 – June: 13th G7 summit held.
- 1993 – December: Massimo Cacciari becomes mayor.
- 1996 – 29 January: La Fenice opera house is destroyed by fire.
- 1999 – City master plan created.
- 2000
  - April: Paolo Costa becomes mayor.
  - Sacca Sessola sold to a multi-national company for conversion into a private tourist hotel complex.

== 21st century ==
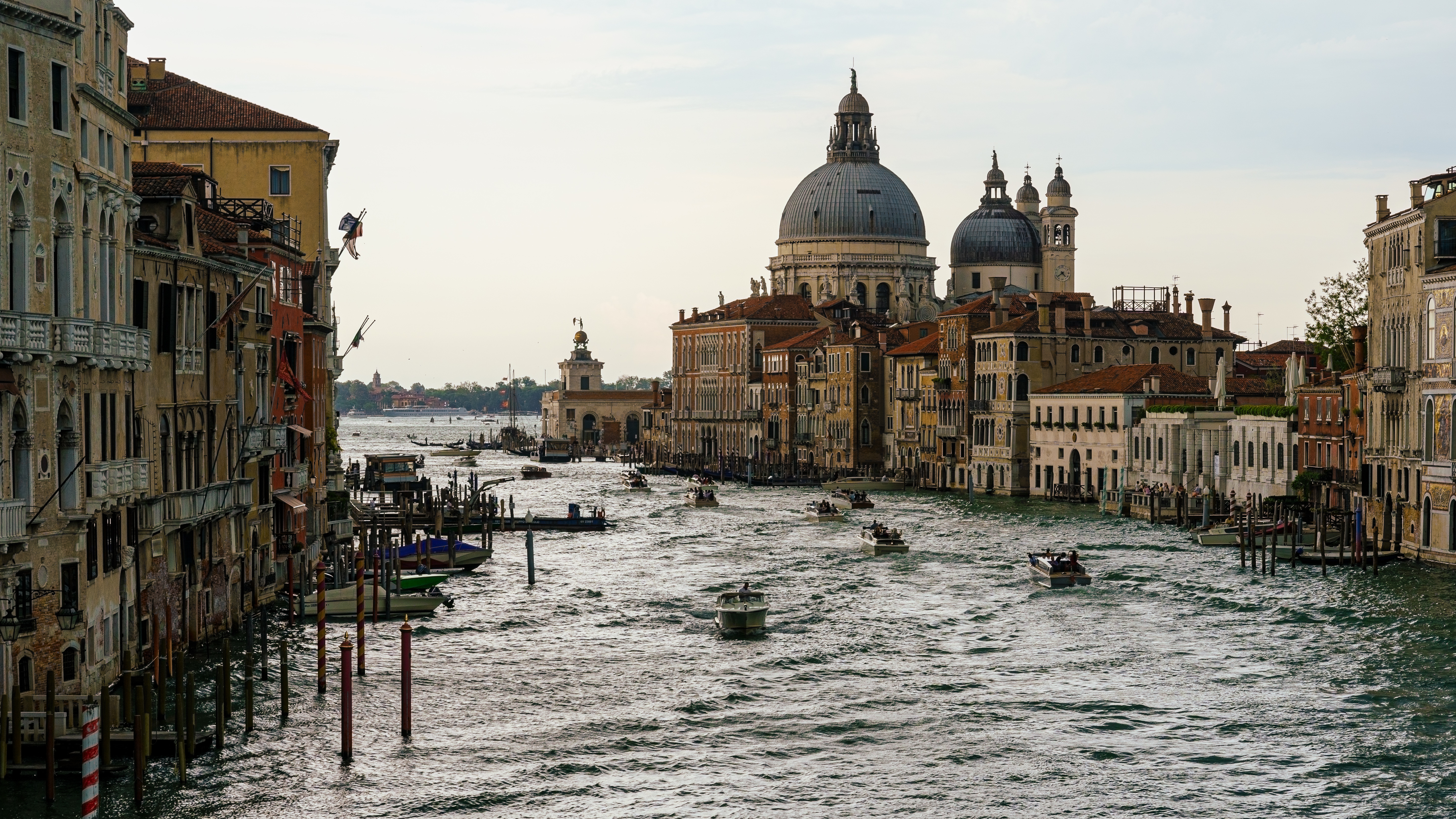
Venice in 2019

- 2003 – Buildings on Isola di San Clemente refurbished as a luxury hotel complex.
- 2005 – April: Massimo Cacciari becomes mayor again.
- 2006 – Veritas (water/trash municipal entity) established.
- 2008 – 3 March: Fondazione Musei Civici di Venezia established.
- 2010 – April: Giorgio Orsoni becomes mayor.
- 2013 – Population: 259,263 comune; 865,421 province.
- 2014
  - 4 June: Mayor Orsoni arrested.
  - 29 September: Clooney-Alamuddin wedding.
- 2015 – Local election held; Luigi Brugnaro becomes mayor.
- 2019
  - The Venice Boat Show was founded and held at the Venetian Arsenal.
  - 12 November: Second highest acqua alta hits an already flooded city.
- 2020 – Venice was hit hard by the COVID-19 pandemic, tourism is blocked and the Carnival of Venice is closed early.
- 2021 – 25 March: 1600th anniversary of the founding of Venice.
- 2025 – 28 June: Jeff Bezos-Lauren Sanchez wedding.

== See also ==
- History of the city of Venice (it)
- List of mayors of Venice, 1806–present
- Timeline of the Republic of Venice

Timelines of other cities in the macroregion of Northeast Italy:^{(it)}

- Emilia-Romagna region: Timeline of Bologna; Ferrara; Forlì; Modena; Parma; Piacenza; Ravenna; Reggio Emilia; Rimini
- Friuli-Venezia Giulia region: Timeline of Trieste
- Trentino-South Tyrol region: Timeline of Trento
- Veneto region: Timeline of Padua; Treviso; Verona; Vicenza

== Bibliography ==
- Peter Ackroyd (2010). Venice: Pure City. Knopf. ISBN 978-0-385-53153-5.
- Umberto Benigni (1912). "Venice". Catholic Encyclopedia. New York. pp. 333–341.
- R. J. B. Bosworth (2014). Italian Venice: A History. Yale University Press. ISBN 978-0-300-21011-8.
- Burke, Peter (1974). Venice and Amsterdam: A Study of Seventeenth-Century Elites. ISBN 9780851170527.
- Brown, Horatio Robert Forbes (1910). "Venice" . Encyclopædia Britannica. Vol. 27 (11th ed.). pp. 995–1007.
- David Chambers; Brian Pullan, eds. (2001). Venice: A Documentary History, 1450-1630. University of Toronto Press. ISBN 978-0-8020-8424-8.
- A Week in Venice: a Complete Guide-book (4th ed.). Venice: Colombo Coen and Son. 1880.
- Ferraro, Joanne M. (2012). Venice: History of the Floating City. Cambridge University Press. ISBN 978-0-521-88359-7.
- C. A. Fletcher; T. Spencer (2005). Flooding and Environmental Challenges for Venice and Its Lagoon: State of Knowledge. Cambridge University Press. ISBN 978-0-521-84046-0.
- John Block Friedman; Kristen Mossler Figg (2000). "Venice". Trade, Travel, and Exploration in the Middle Ages: an Encyclopedia. Routledge. p. 625+. ISBN 978-1-135-59094-9.
- Gasparri, Stefano (2015). "The formation of an early medieval community: Venice between provincial and urban identity". Three empires, three cities: Identity, material culture and legitimacy in Venice, Ravenna and Rome, 750-1000. Brepols: Turnhout. pp. 35–50.
- Gasparri, Stefano (2018). "The First Dukes and the Origins of Venice". Venice and Its Neighbors from the 8th to 11th Century: Through Renovation and Continuity. Leiden-Boston: Brill. pp. 5–26.
- Gasparri, Stefano (2021). "The Origins of Venice: Between Italy, Byzantium and the Adriatic". Byzantium, Venice and the Medieval Adriatic: Spheres of Maritime Power and Influence, c. 700-1453. Cambridge: Cambridge University Press. pp. 98–110.
- Gelichi, Sauro (2021a). "The Northern Adriatic Area between the Eighth and the Ninth Century: New Landscapes, New Cities". Byzantium, Venice and the Medieval Adriatic: Spheres of Maritime Power and Influence, c. 700-1453. Cambridge: Cambridge University Press. pp. 111–132.
- Gelichi, Sauro (2021b). "The Venetiae, the Exarchate and the Pentapolis". A Companion to Byzantine Italy. Boston-Leiden: Brill. pp. 360–386.
- Richard John Goy (2006). Building Renaissance Venice. Yale University Press. ISBN 0-300-11292-0.
- Benjamin Vincent (1910), "Venice", Haydn's Dictionary of Dates (25th ed.), London: Ward, Lock & Co.
- Deborah Howard (2002). The Architectural History of Venice. Yale University Press. ISBN 978-0-300-09029-1.
- Jonathan Keates (2005). The Siege of Venice. Chatto & Windus. ISBN 978-0-701-16637-3.
- Edward Muir (1986). Civic Ritual in Renaissance Venice. Princeton University Press. ISBN 0-691-10200-7.
- Nicol, Donald M. (1992) [1988]. Byzantium and Venice: A Study in Diplomatic and Cultural Relations (2. ed.). Cambridge: Cambridge University Press.
- Norwich, John J. (1982). A History of Venice. New York: Knopf.
- Pazienza, Annamaria (2018). "Archival Documents as Narrative: The Sources of the Istoria Veneticorum and the Plea of Rižana". Venice and Its Neighbors from the 8th to 11th Century: Through Renovation and Continuity. Leiden-Boston: Brill. pp. 27–50.
- Peters, Edward; Foulke, William D., eds. (2003) [1907]. Paul the Deacon: History of the Lombards. Philadelphia: University of Pennsylvania Press.
- Trudy Ring, ed. (1996). "Venice". Southern Europe. International Dictionary of Historic Places. Vol. 3. Fitzroy Dearborn. p. 745+. ISBN 9781134259656. OCLC 31045650.
- Gerhard Rösch (2002). "The Serrata of the Great Council and Venetian society, 1286-1323". In John Jeffries Martin; Dennis Romano (eds.). Venice Reconsidered: The History and Civilization of an Italian City-State, 1297–1797. Johns Hopkins University Press. ISBN 978-0-8018-7308-9.
- Mariolina Toniolo; Turiddo Pugliese (2005). "Venice". In Anton Kreukels; et al. (eds.). Metropolitan Governance and Spatial Planning: Comparative Case Studies of European City-Regions. Routledge. ISBN 978-1-134-49606-8.
- George Henry Townsend (1867), "Venice", A Manual of Dates (2nd ed.), London: Frederick Warne & Co.
- Wickham, Chris (1981). Early Medieval Italy: Central Power and Local Society, 400-1000. Totowa, NJ: Barnes & Noble.
