= 2026 Italian local elections =

Italian local elections

The 2026 Italian local elections were held on 24 and 25 May 2026, with runoffs in election being held on 7 and 8 June, in the ordinary-statute regions, Friuli-Venezia Giulia, and Sicily. In Trentino-Alto Adige/Südtirol, the elections were held on 17 May, with runoffs on 31 May. In Sardinia, the first round is scheduled for 7 and 8 June, with runoffs on 21 and 22 June.

The elections involve the mayors and municipal councils of 894 municipalities, including 20 provincial capitals. Provincial elections for 16 provincial councils and 20 provincial presidents are scheduled to take place on various dates throughout the year.

== Summary of municipal elections ==
Majority of each coalition in the municipalities which have a population higher than 15,000 inhabitants:

=== Municipal elections by region ===
Geographical distribution of municipalities
Region	Provincial capitals	Total	
Region	Provincial capitals	Major Municipalities	Minor Municipalities
Piedmont	0	5	75
Lombardy	2	14	79
Veneto	1	7	43
Liguria	0	0	18
Emilia-Romagna	0	5	11
Tuscany	3	7	13
Umbria	0	0	6
Marche	2	4	23
Lazio	0	9	28
Abruzzo (Note: On 8-9 March, the renewal of the first round, which had already taken place in the 2024 session, took place in Pescara, limited to some sections.)	1	2	58
Molise	0	0	19
Campania	2	26	62
Apulia	2	17	37
Basilicata	0	0	16
Calabria	2	5	72
Aosta Valley (Note: On March 29, the second round of voting, which had already taken place in the 2025 session, took place in Champdepraz.)	0	0	1
Trentino-Alto Adige/Südtirol	0	0	2
Friuli-Venezia Giulia	0	0	11
Sicily	3	17	54
Sardinia	2	3	145
Total	20	121	773
Source: Ministry of Interior

=== Municipal elections in provincial capitals ===
Centre-left coalition
Centre-right coalition
Centre-right civic list
Five Star Movement
South calls North
Centrist coalition
Civic list
Prefectural commissioner

Region	City	Population	Incumbent mayor	Elected mayor	1st round		2nd round		Seats	Source
Region	City	Population	Incumbent mayor	Elected mayor	Votes	%	Votes	%	Seats	Source
Lombardy	Lecco	47,334	Mauro Gattinoni (Ind.)	Filippo Boscagli (FdI)	11,324	48.65%	11,905	52.04%	20 / 32	
Lombardy	Mantua	50,226	Mattia Palazzi (PD)	Andrea Murari (PD)	14,537	69.87%			24 / 32	
Veneto	Venice	249,472	Luigi Brugnaro (Ind.)	Simone Venturini (UdC)	56,344	51.03%			22 / 36	
Tuscany	Arezzo	96,534	Alessandro Ghinelli (Ind.)	Marcello Comanducci (FdI)	19,886	43.81%	22,698	55.75%	20 / 32	
Tuscany	Pistoia	89,083	Anna Maria Celesti (FI) (Note: Deputy replacing mayor Alessandro Tomasi (FdI) since 1 December 2025)	Giovanni Capecchi (EV)	22,512	54.42%			20 / 32	
Tuscany	Prato	198,950	Claudio Sammartino (Note: Special commissioner replacing mayor Ilaria Bugetti (PD) since 30 July 2025)	Matteo Biffoni (PD)	39,371	54.73%			20 / 32	
Marche	Fermo	35,824	Mauro Torresi (Ind.) (Note: Deputy replacing mayor Paolo Calcinaro (Ind.) since 17 December 2025)	Alberto Scarfini (Ind.)	9,643	52.97%			20 / 32	
Marche	Macerata	40,677	Sandro Parcaroli (Lega)	Sandro Parcaroli (Lega)	10,044	49.96%	10,716	54.30%	20 / 32	
Abruzzo	Chieti	48,398	Diego Ferrara (PD)	Giovanni Legnini (Ind.)	12,426	47.21%	12,345	52.27%	20 / 32	
Campania	Avellino	51,860	Giuliana Perrotta (Note: Special commissioner replacing mayor Laura Nargi (Ind.) since 18 July 2025)	Nello Pizza (PD)	17,048	54.48%			20 / 32	
Campania	Salerno	125,314	Vincenzo Panico (Note: Special commissioner replacing mayor Vincenzo Napoli (PD) since 6 February 2026)	Vincenzo De Luca (PD)	39,306	57.80%			21 / 32	
Apulia	Andria	96,530	Giovanna Bruno (PD)	Giovanna Bruno (PD)	41,847	77.09%			24 / 32	
Apulia	Trani	54,732	Amedeo Bottaro (PD)	Marco Galiano (PD)	12,799	40.69%	12,745	51.14%	20 / 32	
Calabria	Crotone	58,165	Vincenzo Voce (Ind.)	Vincenzo Voce (Ind.)	18,874	62.41%			20 / 32	
Calabria	Reggio Calabria	168,028	Domenico Battaglia (PD) (Note: Deputy replacing mayor Giuseppe Falcomatà since 29 December 2025)	Francesco Cannizzaro (FI)	59,214	67.80%			24 / 32	
Sicily	Agrigento	55,128	Francesco Miccichè (Ind.)	Michele Sodano (Ind.)	11,596	39.10%	14,908	72.30%	5 / 24	
Sicily	Enna	24,882	Maurizio Dipietro (IV)	Vladimiro Crisafulli (PD)	9,975	64.11%			20 / 30	
Sicily	Messina	216,532	Piero Mattei (Note: Special commissioner replacing mayor Federico Basile (ScN) since 27 February 2026)	Federico Basile (ScN)	64,533	58.42%			20 / 32	
Sardinia	Sanluri	8,012	Alberto Urpi (Ind.)	Alberto Urpi (Ind.)	3,520	73.39%			12 / 16	
Sardinia	Tempio Pausania	12,880	Giannetto Addis (Ind.)	Gianna Masu (Ind.)	1,925	24.89%	4,073	57.48%	10 / 16	

== Municipal elections ==
=== Lombardy ===
==== Lecco ====
2026 Lecco municipal election
- 24–25 May 2026 (1st round); 7–8 June 2026 (2nd round)
- Turnout: 60.46% (1st round) ▼4.26%; 59.22% (2nd round) ▼1.24%
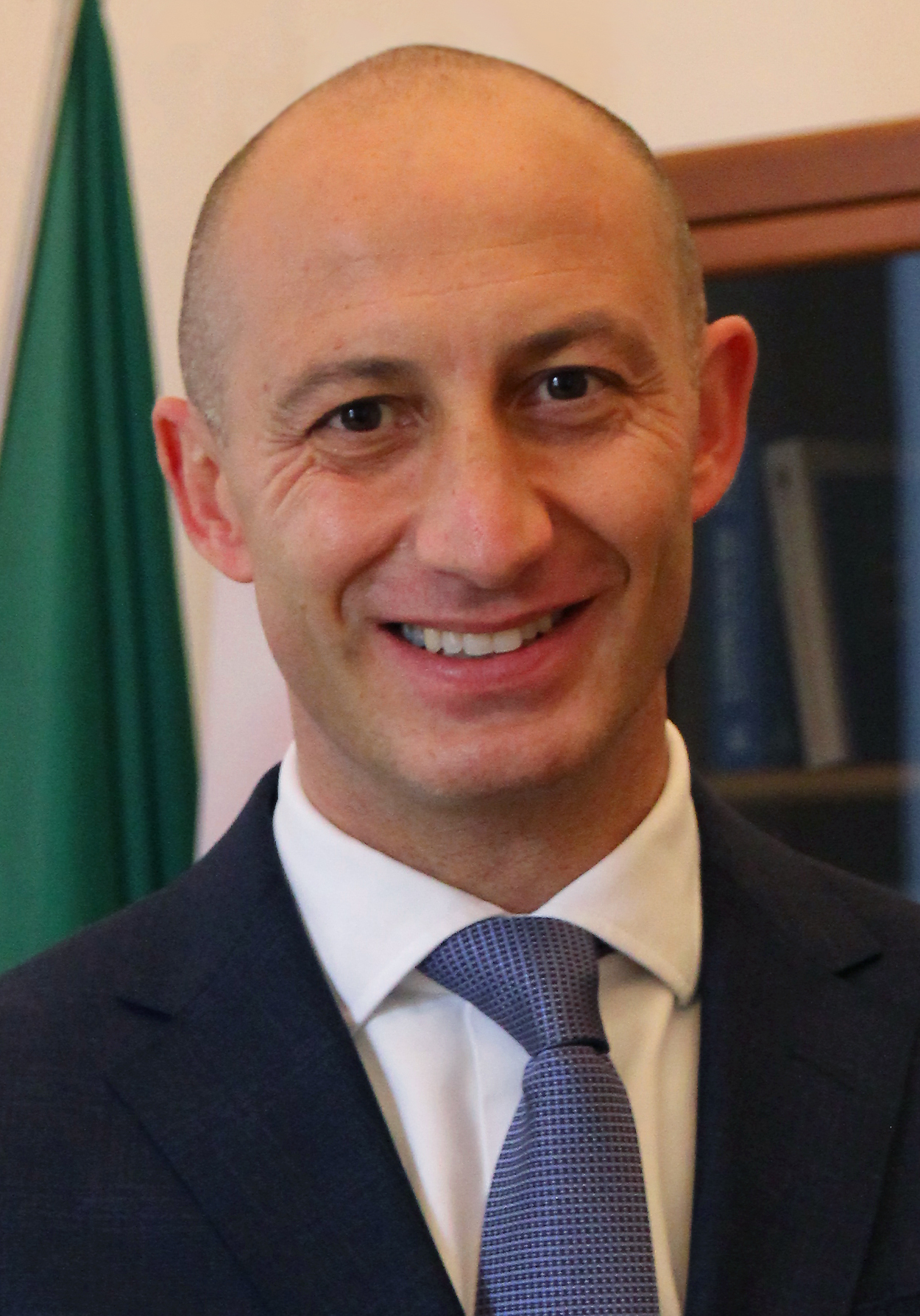
Candidate	Filippo Boscagli	Mauro Gattinoni
Party	Brothers of Italy	Independent
Alliance	Centre-right coalition	Centre-left coalition
First round	11,324 (48.65%)	9,899 (42.53%)
Final round	11,905 (52.04%)	10,973 (47.96%)
Mayor before election
Mauro Gattinoni
Independent
Elected mayor
Filippo Boscagli
Brothers of Italy

==== Mantua ====
2026 Mantova municipal election
- 24–25 May 2026
- Turnout: 52.61% (▼8.77%)
Candidate	Andrea Murari	Raffaele Zancuoghi
Party	Democratic Party	Independent
Alliance	Centre-left coalition	Centre-right coalition
Popular vote	14,537	4,974
Percentage	69.87%	23.91%
Mayor before election
Mattia Palazzi
Democratic Party
Elected mayor
Andrea Murari
Democratic Party

=== Veneto ===
==== Venice ====
2026 Venice municipal election
- 24–25 May 2026
- Turnout: 55.90% ▼6.33%
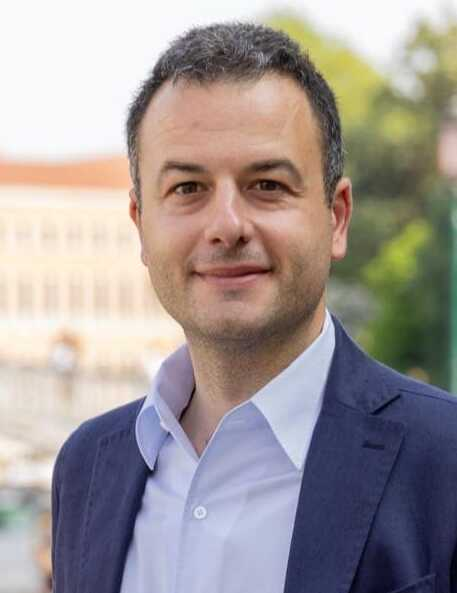

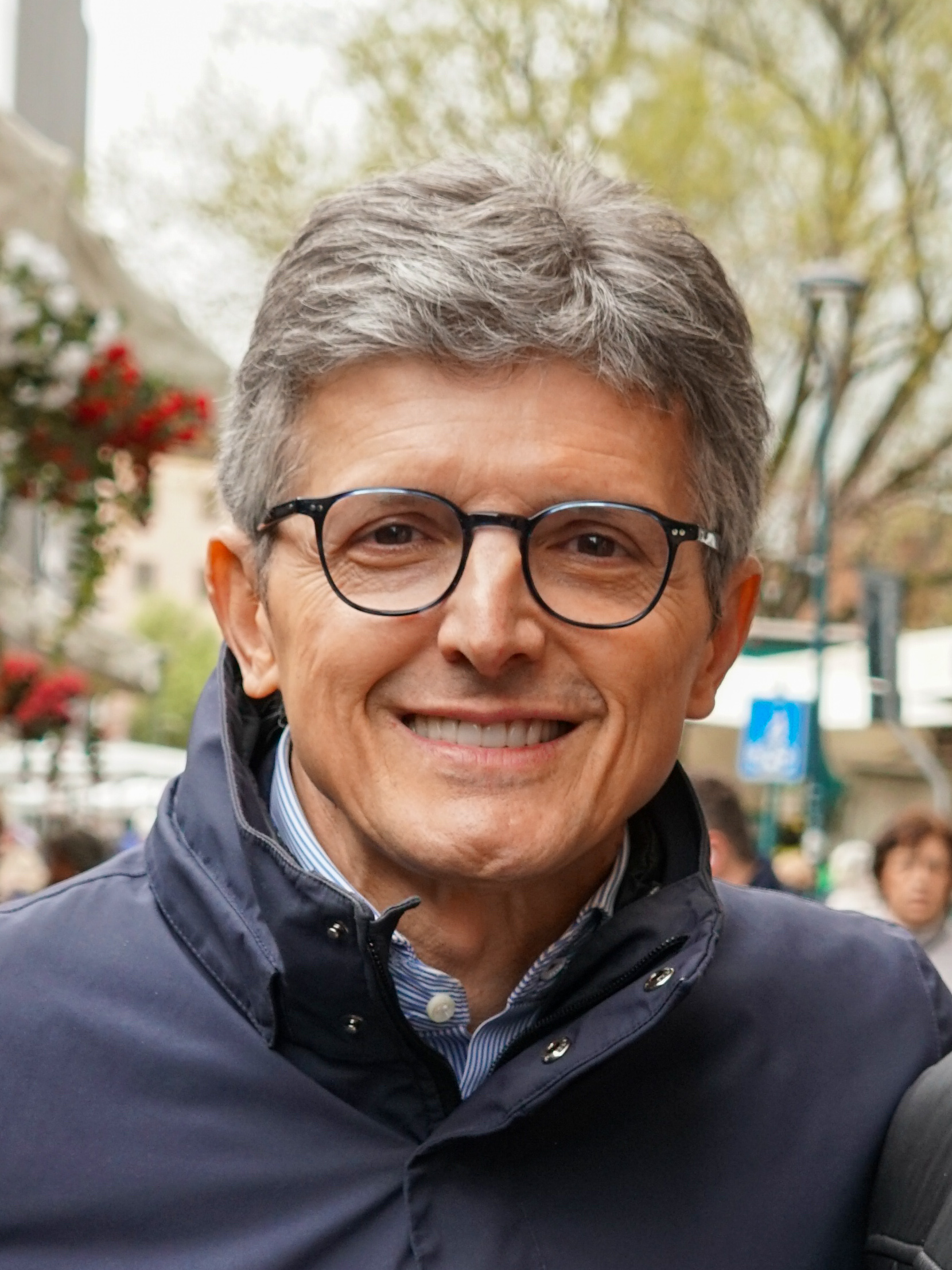
Candidate	Simone Venturini	Andrea Martella
Party	Independent	Democratic Party
Alliance	Centre-right coalition	Centre-left coalition
Popular vote	56,344	43,294
Percentage	51.03% ▼3.11%	39.21% ▲9.94%
Mayor before election
Luigi Brugnaro
Coraggio Italia
Elected mayor
Simone Venturini
Independent

Candidates & Parties	Party	Votes	%	Seats
	Simone Venturini	56,344	51.03	22
	Venturini for Mayor (Note: Includes members of Coraggio Italia and Azione.)	32,046	29.02	14
	Brothers of Italy	13,726	12.43	5
	Lega	5,032	4.56	2
	Forza Italia	2,653	2.40	1
	Union of the Centre	836	0.76	—
	Party of the Venetians	563	0.51	—
	Andrea Martella	43,294	39.21	13
	Democratic Party	26,444	23.95	9
	Green Left Alliance	5,516	4.99	1
	Terra e Acqua 2026	2,876	2.60	1
	Five Star Movement	2,779	2.52	1
	Venezia Riformista (Avanti PSI–Italia Viva–+Europa–Radicali Venezia)	1,446	1.31	—
	Venezia è Tua	1,386	1.26	—
	Pace Salute Lavoro - Communist Refoundation Party	910	0.82	—
	Michele Boldrin	3,795	3.44	1
	ORA!	3,476	3.15	1
	Giovanni Andrea Martini	2,332	2.11	—
	Tutta la città insieme!	1,804	1.63	—
	Abc Ambiente Bene Comune	410	0.37	—
	Claudio Vernier (Volt Europa)	1,963	1.78	—
	Città Vive (Note: List linked to Volt Europa.)	1,911	1.73	—
	Roberto Agirmo	1,434	1.30	—
	Szumski Resistere Veneto	1,405	1.27	—
	Luigi Corò	813	0.74	—
	Futuro per Venezia Mestre	791	0.72	—
	Pierangelo Del Zotto	441	0.40	—
	Prima il Veneto	431	0.39	—
Total valid votes		110,416	100.00	36
Blank and invalid ballots		2,351		
Total turnout		112,767	55.90	
Registered voters		201,713		

== Provincial elections ==
Elections for provincial presidents
Date	Province	Outgoing president	Elected president	Sources
10 January	Mantua	Carlo Bottani	Carlo Bottani	
24 January	Lecco	Alessandra Hofmann	Alessandra Hofmann	
1 February	Lecce	Stefano Minerva	Fabio Tarantino	
1 February	Treviso	Stefano Marcon	Marco Donadel	
1 February	Rovigo	Enrico Ferrarese	Enrico Ferrarese	
8 March	Cosenza	Rosaria Succurro	Biagio Faragalli	
14 March	Pescara	Ottavio De Martinis	Giorgio De Luca	
15 March	Ascoli Piceno	Sergio Loggi	Fabio Salvi	
15 March	Latina	Gerardo Stefanelli	Federico Carnevale	
15 March	Brindisi (I)	Toni Matarrelli	Angelo Pomes	
15 March	Chieti	Francesco Menna	Francesco Menna	
15 March	Ancona	Daniele Carnevali	Daniele Carnevali	
15 March	Fermo	Michele Ortenzi	Michele Ortenzi	
15 March	Macerata	Sandro Parcaroli	Alessandro Gentilucci	
15 March	Bergamo	Pasquale Gandolfi	Gianfranco Gafforelli	
15 March	Forlì-Cesena	Enzo Lattuca	Enzo Lattuca	
15 March	Grosseto	Francesco Limatola	Francesco Limatola	
18 March	Belluno	Roberto Padrin	Marco Staunovo Polacco	
29 March	Crotone	Sergio Ferrari	Antonio Ammirati	
29 March	Biella	Emanuele Ramella Pralungo	Emanuele Ramella Pralungo	
12 April	Lodi	Fabrizio Santantonio	Fabrizio Santantonio	
4 May	Salerno	Vincenzo Napoli	Giuseppe Parente	
6 June	Avellino	Rizieri Buonopane	Fausto Picone	
21 June	Asti	Maurizio Rasero	Simone Nosenzo	
12 July	Pesaro and Urbino	Giuseppe Paolini	Alberto Alessandri	
26 July	Benevento	Nino Lombardi	Nino Lombardi	
15 September	Padua	Sergio Giordani	Daniele Canella	
27 September	Brindisi (II)	Angelo Pomes	Elio Ciccarese	
19 October	Medio Campidano	Giuseppe De Fanti	Francesco Sanna	
22 November	Savona	Pierangelo Olivieri	Mauro Demichelis	

=== Summary of provincial president election ===
Coalition	Presidents	Change
Centre-right	13 / 21	3▲
Centre-left	7 / 21	3▼
Center	1 / 21	1▲
Civic Lists	0 / 21	1▼

=== Summary of the Provincial Council election ===
Party/Coalition	Councillors	Seat changes
Center-right	69 / 146	15▲
Center-Left	66 / 146	5▼
Us of the Centre	5 / 146	1▲
Action	4 / 146	3▲
Civic Lists	1 / 146	2▼
Truly	1 / 146	2▼
Centrist Civic List	0 / 146	10▼
