= Simone Venturini =

Italian politician

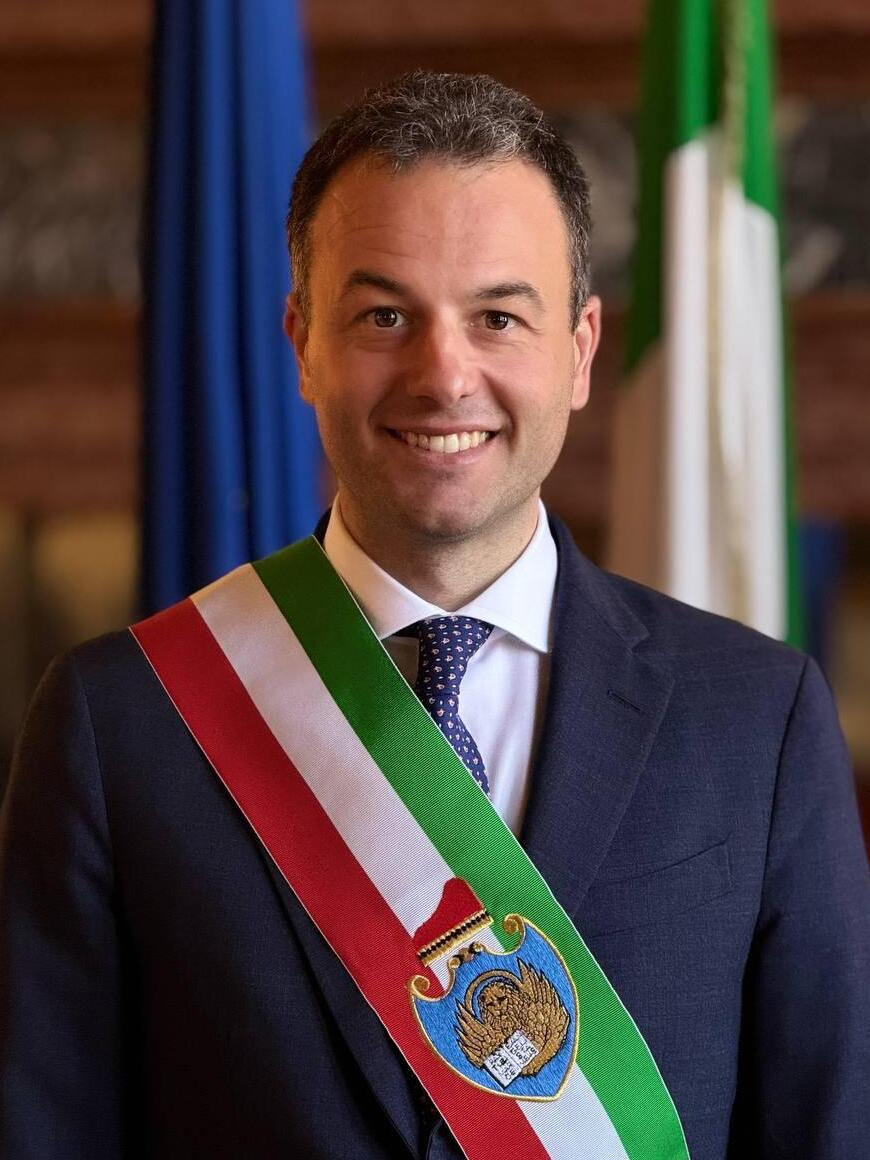

Mayor of Venice
- Incumbent
- Assumed office 29 May 2026
- Preceded by: Luigi Brugnaro

Metropolitan mayor of Venice
- Incumbent
- Assumed office 29 May 2026
- Preceded by: Luigi Brugnaro

Personal details
- Born: 1 October 1987 (age 39) Venice, Veneto, Italy
- Party: Independent; UDC (2010–2015); CI (2021–2026)
- Education: University of Padua
- Profession: Lawyer

Simone Venturini (born 1 October 1987) is an Italian politician and lawyer serving as mayor of Venice since 2026. Previously a member of the city council and an assessor in the municipal administrations of Luigi Brugnaro, he was elected mayor in the 2026 local election. He won in the first round with 51.03% of the vote and took office on 29 May 2026.
