= Michaela Biancofiore =

Italian politician (born 1970)

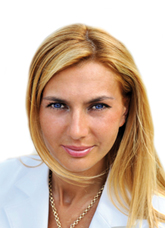

Member of the Chamber of Deputies
- Incumbent
- Assumed office 28 April 2006

Personal details
- Born: 28 December 1970 (age 55) Bolzano, Italy
- Party: FI (1994–2009); PdL (2009–2013); FI (2019–2021); Independent (2021–2022); CI (since 2022)
- Education: Libera Università Mediterranea
- Profession: Politician, businesswoman

Michaela Biancofiore (born 28 December 1970) is an Italian politician.

== Early life and career ==
Born in Bolzano to an Apulian father and a Roman mother, Biancofiore graduated from the "Gregorio Elladio" school in Spoleto, where she lived in boarding school as an orphan of a state employee. She worked for Mario Cecchi Gori as assistant director for the films Al lupo al lupo, Damned the Day I Met You and Let's Not Keep in Touch. She was vice president of the football team F.C. Bolzano 1996 which played in Excellence, currently merged with Virtus Don Bosco giving life to the Virtus Bolzano association. In 2017 she graduated in International Law from the Free Mediterranean University. She is currently an entrepreneur in the wellness sector.

== Politics ==
Biancofiore enrolled in Forza Italia at age 22. In the 1995 Bolzano municipal elections she ran with a civic list called Vorwärts Südtirol, which obtained 1.39%, although there was a Forza Italia list with candidate for mayor Ermanno Füstöss. Biancofiore obtained 18 preferential votes and was not elected. In 2001 she was appointed adviser for local autonomy and for the Coordination of Information and Security for the Ministry of Civil Service, and in 2002 for the Ministry of Foreign Affairs. In 2003 she was elected councilor of the Autonomous Province of Bolzano for FI with 3,680 preferences. On 7 June 2006, having been elected to the Chamber of Deputies, Biancofiore resigned as provincial councilor.

In the 2008 general election she was re-elected to the Chamber of Deputies, but in the constituency of Campania, despite her South Tyrolean origins. In 2010 she was elected municipal councilor in the local election of Bolzano, but in 2011 the Council started the procedure for forfeiture against her due to the high number of absences. In the parliamentary election of 2013 she was re-elected deputy on the PdL list. On April 30, 2013 she was appointed Undersecretary for Equal Opportunities by Prime Minister Enrico Letta, but he removed her from office just two days later, following the controversy generated by her previous homophobic statements. She was subsequently assigned to the office of Undersecretary for administrative simplification and from 26 June 2013 to the office of Undersecretary for sport.

On 1 August 2013, after the confirmation of the sentence against Silvio Berlusconi, her political leader, she resigned as Undersecretary together with the other PdL members of the government. On 4 October 2013, Prime Minister Enrico Letta accepted her resignation. She was the only member of the Letta government, belonging to the PdL, who did not withdraw her resignation. On 24 January 2014 Berlusconi appointed her as Head of Forza Italia's human resources.

On March 30, 2016, on the occasion of the municipal elections, she declared that wanted to leave the party after having received directives from Berlusconi himself, for a different candidate from the one she chose. However, this announcement was not followed by an actual abandonment. From the following March 24 she participated in the Presidential Committee of the party. On 12 August 2017 she replaced Elisabetta Gardini as party coordinator in Trentino Alto Adige. Always in defense of the Italian South Tyrolean culture, in 2016 she compared the Germanization policy of South Tyrol by the South Tyrolean People's Party, in particular on the party's proposal to remove the toponymy in Italian, to the devastation of Palmyra by ISIS.

In the 2018 political elections she was a candidate for the Chamber in the single-member constituency of Bolzano, where she was however defeated by Maria Elena Boschi, and was the leader in the proportional list of the Emilia-Romagna 4 constituency, in which she was instead elected. On 22 October of the same year she resigned as regional coordinator following the disappointing result of FI in the regional election (1% in Bolzano and 2.8% in Trento, with one councilor elected). On 24 December 2019 she announced her farewell to the party after 26 years of militancy following her "dismissal" as regional coordinator, only to return in May 2020 when Berlusconi appointed a new coordination of 14 people, including her.
