= Mayor of Venice =

- Sindaco di Venezia

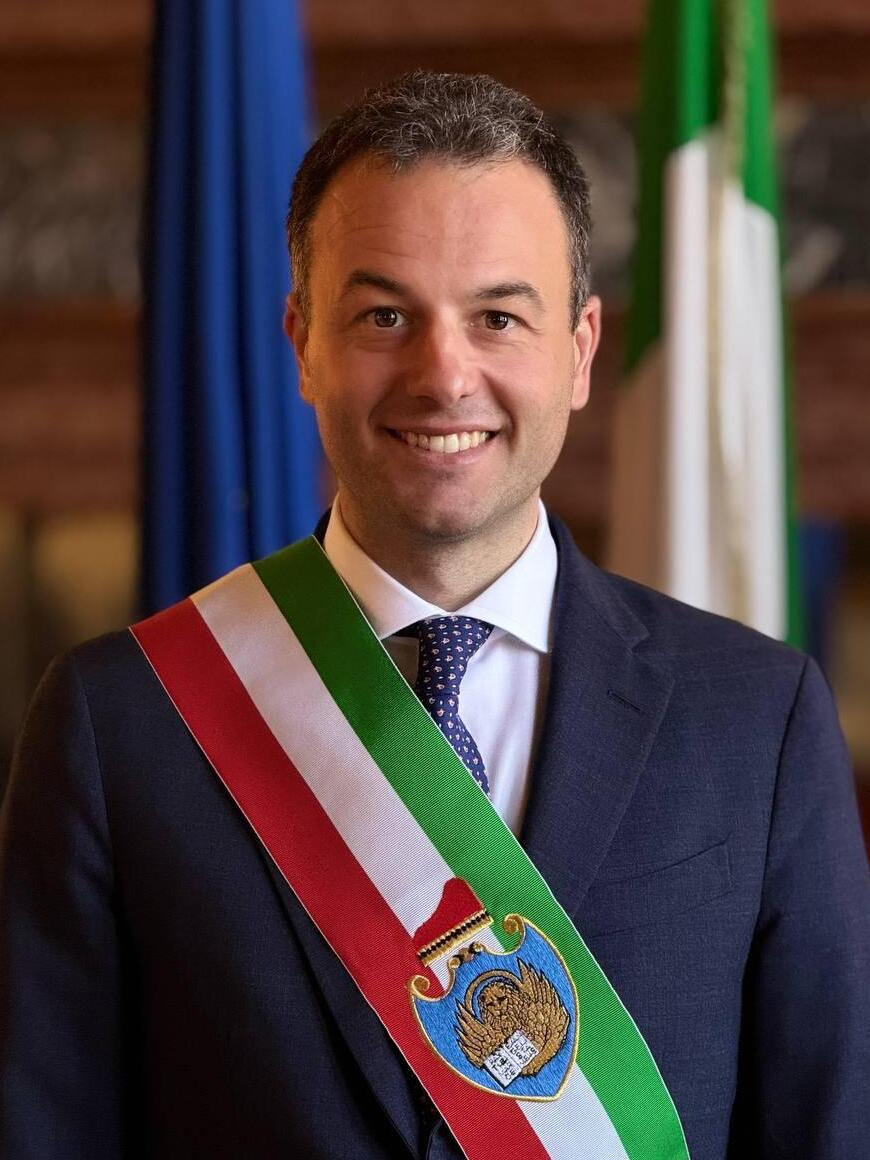
- Incumbent; Simone Venturini since 29 May 2026
- Seat: Ca' Farsetti
- Appointer: Electorate of Venice
- Term length: 5 years, renewable once
- Inaugural holder: Daniele Renier
- Formation: 1806
- Deputy: Francesca Zaccariotto
- Salary: €85,000 annually
- Website: Comune di Venezia

The Mayor of Venice (Italian: sindaco di Venezia) is an elected politician who, along with the Venice City Council of 36 members, is accountable for the strategic government of the municipality of Venice, Veneto, Italy.

The current office holder is Simone Venturini, a centre-right independent who has been in office since 2026.

== Overview ==
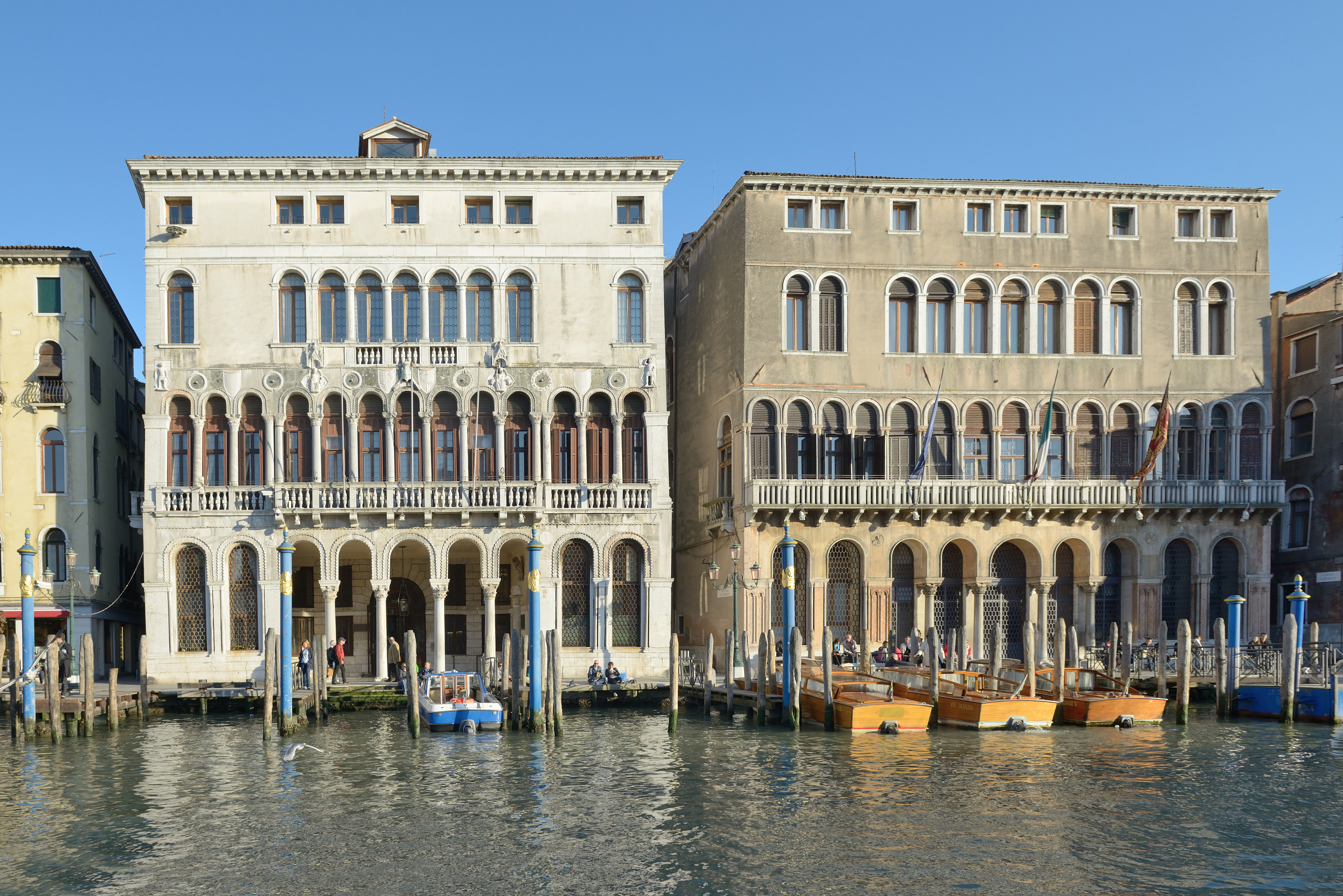
Ca' Loredan and Ca' Farsetti, Venice City Hall

According to the Italian Constitution, the Mayor of Venice is a member of the City Council, but the six borough presidents are not considered Mayors because they are not the heads of separate municipalities.

The Mayor is elected by the population of Venice. In addition to electing the Mayor, the citizens of Venice also elect the members of the City Council. The City Council has the power to set policy guidelines for the Mayor and to remove him from office through a vote of no confidence.The Mayor is entitled to appoint and release the members of his government.

Since 1993, the Mayor of Venice has been elected directly by the city's voters. In cities with a population over 15,000, the voters can either choose the Mayor directly or vote for a party in the Mayor's coalition. If no candidate receives at least 50% of votes, the top two candidates go to a second round after two weeks. The election of the City Council is based on a direct vote for a candidate with a preferential vote system: the candidate with the most preferences wins. The number of the seats for each party is determined proportionally.

The seat of the City Council is the city hall Ca' Loredan on the Canal Grande.

== List of mayors of Venice ==
=== Podestà (1806–1866) ===
Podestà of Venice were appointed since 1806 to 1866 by the rulers of the city during the early- to mid-19th century: Napoleon and the Habsburgs.

- 1806–1811 – Daniele Renier
- 1811–1816 – Bartolomeo Gerolamo Gradenigo
- 1817–1818 – Marco Molin
- 1818–1827 – Francesco Calbo Crotta
- 1827–1834 – Domenico Morosini
- 1834–1837 – Giuseppe Boldù
- 1838–1857 – Giovanni Correr
- 1857–1859 – Alessandro Marcello
- 1860–1866 – Pierluigi Bembo

=== Kingdom of Italy (1866–1946) ===
In 1860, the nascent Kingdom of Italy created the office of the Mayor of Venice (Sindaco di Venezia), chosen by the City council:

	Mayor	Term start	Term end	Party
1	Giambattista Giustinian (1816–1888)	1866	1868	Right
2	Giuseppe Giovanelli (1824–1886)	1868	1870	Right
3	Antonio Fornoni (1825–1897)	1870	1875	Right
(1)	Giambattista Giustinian (1816–1888)	1875	1878	Right
4	Dante Di Serego Alighieri (1843–1895)	1878	1888	Right
5	Lorenzo Tiepolo (1845–1913)	1888	1890	Right
6	Riccardo Selvatico (1849–1901)	1890	1895	Left
7	Filippo Grimani (1850–1921)	1895	1919	Right
8	Davide Giordano (1864–1954)	1919	1924	ANI
Fascist Podestà (1926–1945)
1	Pietro Orsi	1924	1929	PNF
2	Ettore Zorzi	1929	1930	PNF
3	Mario Alverà	1930	1938	PNF
4	Giovanni Marcello	1938	1943	PNF
5	Giovanni Battista Dall'Armi	1943	1945	PFR
Liberation (1945–1946)
9	Giovanni Ponti (1896–1961)	1945	1946	DC

=== Republic of Italy (since 1946) ===
==== City Council election (1946–1993) ====
From 1946 to 1993, the Mayor of Venice was chosen by the City Council.

	Mayor	Term start	Term end	Party	Coalition	Election
1	Giovanni Battista Gianquinto (1905–1987)	25 June 1946	21 January 1951	PCI	PCI • PSI	1946
2	Angelo Spanio (1892–1976)	21 January 1951	13 January 1955	DC	DC	1951
3	Roberto Tognazzi (1899–1974)	13 January 1955	28 May 1960	DC	DC • PSDI	1956
4	Giovanni Favaretto Fisca (1902–1986)	28 May 1960	12 May 1970	DC	DC • PSDI	1960
4	Giovanni Favaretto Fisca (1902–1986)	28 May 1960	12 May 1970	DC	DC • PSI • PSDI	1964
5	Giorgio Longo (1924–2020)	12 May 1970	21 December 1975	DC	DC • PSI • PSDI	1970
6	Mario Rigo (1929–2019)	21 December 1975	18 January 1985	PSI	PCI • PSI	1975; 1980
7	Nereo Laroni (1942–2019)	18 January 1985	11 March 1987	PSI	PCI • PSI • PRI	1985
8	Antonio Casellati (1928–2020)	11 March 1987	25 January 1988	PRI	PCI • PSI • PRI • FdV	1985
9	Costante Degan (1930–1988)	25 January 1988	12 February 1988	DC	—	1985
(8)	Antonio Casellati (1928–2020)	12 February 1988	11 May 1990	PRI	PCI • PSI • PSDI • PRI • FdV	1985
10	Ugo Bergamo (b. 1951)	11 May 1990	1 June 1993	DC	DC • PSI • PSDI	1990
Giovanni Troiani, Special Prefectural Commissioner (1 June 1993 – 9 December 1993) (Note: Nominated by the Prefect after the Mayor and the members of the City Council resigned in order to hold a new election under the provision of the new local electoral law.)

==== Direct election (since 1993) ====
Since 1993, the Mayor of Venice has been chosen through direct elections originally every four then every five years, under new local administration laws:

	Mayor of Venice	Took office	Left office	Party	Coalition	Election
11	Massimo Cacciari (b. 1944)	9 December 1993	17 November 1997	Ind	Alliance of Progressives (PDS-PRC-FdV)	1993
11	Massimo Cacciari (b. 1944)	17 November 1997	25 January 2000 (Note: Resigned in order to participate to the regional elections.)	Ind	The Olive Tree (PDS-PPI-PRC-FdV)	1997
Corrado Scivoletto, Special Prefectural Commissioner (25 January 2000 – 30 April 2000)
12	Paolo Costa (b. 1943)	30 April 2000	18 April 2005	Dem; DL	The Olive Tree (DS-PPI-SDI-PdCI)	2000
(11)	Massimo Cacciari (b. 1944)	18 April 2005	8 April 2010	DL; PD	DL • UDEUR • DS	2005
13	Giorgio Orsoni (b. 1946)	8 April 2010	13 June 2014 (Note: Resigned after a corruption scandal. Partly acquitted and partly prescribed in 2017.)	PD	PD • FdS • FdV; PSI • IdV	2010
Vittorio Zappalorto, Special Prefectural Commissioner (13 June 2014 – 15 June 2015)
14	Luigi Brugnaro (b. 1961)	15 June 2015	26 September 2020	Ind; CI	FI • UDC and right-wing independents	2015
14	Luigi Brugnaro (b. 1961)	26 September 2020 (Note: Election originally scheduled for June 2020 then postponed due to the coronavirus pandemic.)	29 May 2026	Ind; CI	Lega • FdI • FI and right-wing independents	2020
15	Simone Venturini (b. 1987)	29 May 2026 (Note: Election originally scheduled for September 2025 then postponed to May 2026. According to the Italian law, since 2011 local elections can take place each year only between 15 April and 15 June.)	Incumbent	Ind	FdI • Lega • FI and right-wing independents	2026

==== By time in office ====
Rank	Mayor	Political Party	Total time in office	Terms
1	Massimo Cacciari	Ind / DL	11 years, 36 days	3
2	Luigi Brugnaro	Ind	10 years, 348 days	2
3	Giovanni Favaretto Fisca	DC	9 years, 349 days	2
4	Mario Rigo	PSI	9 years, 28 days	2
5	Giorgio Longo	DC	5 years, 223 days	1
6	Roberto Tognazzi	DC	5 years, 136 days	1
7	Paolo Costa	Dem / DL	4 years, 353 days	1
8	Giovanni Battista Gianquinto	PCI	4 years, 210 days	1
9	Giorgio Orsoni	PD	4 years, 66 days	1
10	Angelo Spanio	DC	3 years, 357 days	1
11	Antonio Casellati	PRI	3 years, 43 days	2
12	Ugo Bergamo	DC	3 years, 31 days	1
13	Nereo Laroni	PSI	2 years, 52 days	1
14	Simone Venturini	Ind	121 days	1
15	Costante Degan	DC	18 days	1

== Elections ==
=== City Council elections, 1946–1990 ===
Results

Number of votes for each party:

Election	DC	PCI	PSI	PLI	PRI	PSDI	MSI	Others	Total
24 March 1946	55,260 (36.8%)	40,947 (27.3%)	37,069 (24.7%)	2,251 (1.5%)	7,555 (5.0%)	-	-	6,967 (4.6%)	150,049
27 May 1951	68,070 (37.8%)	54,752 (30.4%)	16,884 (9.4%)	8,331 (4.6%)	1,637 (0.9%)	10,546 (5.8%)	10,693 (9.4%)	9,194 (5.0%)	180,107
27 May 1956	73,394 (37.8%)	41,022 (21.1%)	41,088 (21.1%)	6,629 (3.4%)	1,574 (0.8%)	13,877 (7.1%)	10,062 (5.2%)	6,724 (3.4%)	194,370
6 November 1960	75,936 (35.7%)	49,920 (23.5%)	45,640 (21.5%)	7,020 (3.3%)	2,531 (1.2%)	13,277 (6.2%)	10,294 (4.8%)	7,544 (3.4%)	212,463
22 November 1964	74,411 (33.9%)	55,364 (25.2%)	31,474 (14.3%)	18,286 (8.3%)	-	13,277 (6.8%)	8,733 (4.0%)	16,529 (7.5%)	219,798
7 June 1970	74,057 (31.7%)	62,263 (26.6%)	27,339 (11.6%)	13,113 (5.6%)	8,101 (3.5%)	18,759 (8.0%)	9,705 (4.1%)	18,765 (7.9%)	232,102
15 June 1975	73,351 (29.5%)	85,203 (34.3%)	40,243 (16.2%)	7,409 (3.0%)	9,036 (3.6%)	15,466 (6.2%)	10,956 (4.4%)	6,619 (2.7%)	248,283
8 June 1980	73,492 (31.0%)	77,223 (32.6%)	40,685 (17.2%)	7,409 (3.0%)	7,000 (2.9%)	10,607 (4.5%)	8,454 (3.6%)	12,820 (5.3%)	237,072
12 May 1985	66,071 (27.3%)	73,652 (30.5%)	41,819 (17.3%)	4,964 (2.1%)	11,889 (4.9%)	10,404 (4.3%)	11,704 (4.8%)	21,159 (8.7%)	241,662
6 May 1990	57,800 (25.9%)	52,575 (23.6%)	39,333 (17.6%)	3,295 (1.5%)	7,452 (3.3%)	7,039 (3.2%)	6,579 (2.9%)	48,855 (21.7%)	222,928

Number of seats in the City Council for each party:

Election	DC	PCI	PSI	PLI	PRI	PSDI	MSI	Others	Total
24 March 1946	23	16	15	-	3	-	-	3	60
27 May 1951	31	12	4	4	-	5	2	2	60
27 May 1956	24	13	13	2	-	4	3	1	60
6 November 1960	23	14	13	2	-	4	3	-	60
22 November 1964	21	15	9	5	-	4	2	-	60
7 June 1970	21	17	7	3	2	5	2	3	60
15 June 1975	18	22	10	1	2	4	2	1	60
8 June 1980	20	21	11	1	1	3	2	1	60
12 May 1985	17	19	11	1	3	2	3	4	60
6 May 1990	17	15	11	-	2	2	1	12	60

=== Mayoral and City Council election, 1993 ===
The election took place in two rounds: the first on 21 November, the second on 5 December 1993.

Results

Candidate	Party	Coalition	First round		Second round	
Candidate	Party	Coalition	Votes	%	Votes	%
Massimo Cacciari	Ind	Progressives	89,034	42.29	107,497	55.37
Aldo Mariconda	LV	LV−LN	55,971	26.50	86,643	44.63
Giovanni Castellani	DC	DC-LAV-PS	49,224	23.38		
Bruno Canella	MSI-DN		6,048	2.87		
Others			10,455	4.96		
Eligible voters			270,305	100.00	270,305	100.00
Voted			224,180	82.94	205,517	76.03
Blank or invalid ballots			13,628		11,377	
Total valid votes			210,552		194,140	

Summary of the 1993 Venice City Council election results
Parties and coalitions		Votes	%	Seats
Democratic Party of the Left (Partito Democratico della Sinistra)	PDS	33,997	20.59%	16
Communist Refoundation Party (Rifondazione Comunista)	PRC	10,738	6.50%	5
Federation of the Greens (Federazione dei Verdi)	FdV	9,901	6.00%	4
Socialist Progress (Progresso Socialista)	PS	5,824	3.53%	2
Alliance Venice-Mestre (Alleanza Venezia-Mestre)	AVM	2,244	1.36%	1
The Network (La Rete)	LR	1,996	1.21%	0
Cacciari coalition (Left-wing)		64,700	39.18%	28
Liga Veneta−Lega Nord	LV–LN	49,350	29.88%	10
Christian Democracy (Democrazia Cristiana)	DC	20,384	12.34%	5
Lega Autonomia Veneta	LAV	8,387	5.08%	1
Venice-Mestre Pact (Patto Venezia-Mestre)	PVM	4,891	2.96%	1
Others		2,949	1.79%	0
Castellani coalition (Centre)		36,611	22.17%	7
Italian Social Movement (Movimento Sociale Italiano)	MSI-DN	5,580	3.38%	1
Others		8,909	5.39%	0
Total		165,150	100%	46
Votes cast / turnout		224,180	82.94%	
Registered voters		270,305		
Source: Ministry of the Interior

=== Mayoral and City Council election, 1997 ===
The election took place on 16 November 1997.

Results

Summary of the 1997 Venice City Council election results
Parties and coalitions		Votes	%	Seats
Democratic Party of the Left (Partito Democratico della Sinistra)	PDS	30,052	23.22%	12
Italian People's Party (Partito Popolare Italiano)	PPI	12,287	9.49%	5
Communist Refoundation Party (Rifondazione Comunista)	PRC	11,135	8.60%	4
Federation of the Greens (Federazione dei Verdi)	FdV	10,506	8.12%	4
Others		13,193	10.20%	5
Cacciari coalition (Centre-left)		77,173	59.63%	30
Forza Italia	FI	14,608	11.29%	6
National Alliance (Alleanza Nazionale)	AN	11,039	8.53%	4
Christian Democratic Centre (Centro Cristiano Democratico)	CCD	4,501	3.48%	1
Pizzigati coalition (Centre-right)		30,148	23.29%	11
Liga Veneta–Lega Nord	LV–LN	14,224	10.99%	5
Others		878	0.68%	0
Fabris coalition		15,102	11.67%	5
Others		7,003	5.41%	0
Total		129,426	100%	46
Votes cast / turnout		189,592	72.02%	
Registered voters		263,237		
Source: Ministry of the Interior

Candidate	Party	Coalition	First round	
Candidate	Party	Coalition	Votes	%
Massimo Cacciari	Ind	The Olive Tree	116,751	64.58
Mauro Pizzigati	FI	Pole for Freedoms	37,436	20.71
Giovanni Fabris	LV	LV–LN	18,488	10.23
Others			8,110	4.49
Eligible voters			263,237	100.00
Voted			189,592	72.02
Blank or invalid ballots			8,807	
Total valid votes			180,785	

=== Mayoral and City Council election, 2000 ===
The election took place in two rounds: the first on 16 April, the second on 30 April 2000.

Results

Candidate	Party	Coalition	First round		Second round	
Candidate	Party	Coalition	Votes	%	Votes	%
Renato Brunetta	FI	House of Freedoms	64,956	38.99	53,686	44.04
Paolo Costa	Dem	The Olive Tree	62,755	37.67	68,229	55.96
Gianfranco Bettin	FdV	PRC-FdV	27,086	16.26		
Others			11,785	7.06		
Eligible voters			246,962	100.00	246,962	100.00
Voted			177,510	71.88	124,370	50.36
Blank or invalid ballots			10,928		2,455	
Total valid votes			166,582		121,915	

Summary of the 2000 Venice City Council election results
Parties and coalitions		Votes	%	Seats
Forza Italia	FI	34,261	25.30%	13
National Alliance (Alleanza Nazionale)	AN	9,489	7.01%	3
Lega Nord	LN	5,212	3.85%	1
United Christian Democrats (Cristiani Democratici Uniti)	CDU	2,807	2.07%	1
Christian Democratic Centre (Centro Cristiano Democratico)	CCD	2,428	1.79%	0
Sgarbi Liberal List (Liberal Sgarbi)	LS	1,139	0.84%	0
Brunetta coalition (Centre-right)		55,336	40.86%	18
Democrats of the Left (Democratici di Sinistra)	DS	28,984	21.40%	13
Italian People's Party (Partito Popolare Italiano)	PPI	10,630	7.85%	4
Italian Democratic Socialists (Socialisti Democratici Italiani)	SDI	7,058	5.21%	3
Party of Italian Communists (Partito dei Comunisti Italiani)	PdCI	2,604	1.92%	1
Others		976	0.72%	0
Costa coalition (Center-left)		50,252	37.09%	(Note: Even if the coalition didn't receive the majority of votes, no other alliance was able to obtain overall more than 50% of votes. Once its mayoral candidate won the second round, the coalition was awarded the majority bonus granted by the electoral law to the alliance whose candidate is elected mayor.)21
Communist Refoundation Party (Rifondazione Comunista)	PRC	10,440	7.71%	5
Federation of the Greens (Federazione dei Verdi)	FdV	4,724	3.49%	1
Others		4,192	3.10%	1
Bettin coalition (Left-wing)		19,356	14.30%	(Note: As a result of the pre-electoral agreement with the center-left coalition for the second round.)7
Others		10,499	7.75%	0
Total		135,433	100%	46
Votes cast / turnout		177,510	71.88%	
Registered voters		246,962		
Source: Ministry of the Interior

=== Mayoral and City Council election, 2005 ===
The election took place on two rounds: the first on 3–4 April, the second on 17–18 April 2005.

Results

Candidate	Party	Coalition	First round		Second round	
Candidate	Party	Coalition	Votes	%	Votes	%
Felice Casson	DS	The Olive Tree	60,837	37.68	62,974	49.47
Massimo Cacciari	DL	DL-UDEUR	37,488	23.22	64,315	50.53
Cesare Campa	FI	House of Freedoms	32,726	20.27		
Raffaele Speranzon	AN		10,021	6.21		
Augusto Salvadori	PNE		6,905	4.28		
Alberto Mazzonetto	LN		5,419	3.36		
Others			8,069	4.99		
Eligible voters			233,316	100.00	233,316	100.00
Voted			168,087	72.04	129,885	55.67
Blank or invalid ballots			6,622		2,596	
Total valid votes			161,465		127,289	

Summary of the 2005 Venice City Council election results
Parties and coalitions		Votes	%	Seats
Democrats of the Left (Democratici di Sinistra)	DS	26,531	21.15%	6
Communist Refoundation Party (Rifondazione Comunista)	PRC	8,509	6.78%	1
Federation of the Greens (Federazione dei Verdi)	FdV	4,882	3.89%	1
Party of Italian Communists (Partito dei Comunisti Italiani)	PdCI	2,661	2.12%	0
Italy of Values (Italia dei Valori)	IdV	2,544	2.03%	0
Italian Democratic Socialists (Socialisti Democratici Italiani)	SDI	1,630	1.30%	0
Others		4,463	3.56%	1
Casson coalition (Left-wing)		51,220	40.84%	10
Forza Italia	FI	25,726	20.51%	5
Union of the Centre (Unione di Centro)	UdC	3,966	3.16%	0
Campa coalition (Centre-right)		29,692	23.67%	5
The Daisy (La Margherita)	DL	16,855	13.44%	26
Union of Democrats for Europe (Unione Democratica per l'Europa)	UDEUR	1,784	1.42%	2
Cacciari coalition (Centre-left)		18,639	14.86%	(Note: Even if the coalition didn't receive the majority of votes, no other alliance was able to obtain overall more than 50% of votes. Once its mayoral candidate won the second round, the coalition was awarded the majority bonus granted by the electoral law to the alliance whose candidate is elected mayor.)28
National Alliance (Alleanza Nazionale)	AN	8,490	6.77%	1
Salvadori List–North-East Project (Progetto NordEst)	PNE	5,141	4.10%	1
Lega Nord	LN	4,955	3.95%	1
Others		7,280	5.80%	0
Total		125,417	100%	46
Votes cast / turnout		168,087	72.04%	
Registered voters		233,316		
Source: Ministry of the Interior

=== Mayoral and City Council election, 2010 ===
The election took place on 28–29 March 2010.

Results

Summary of the 2010 Venice City Council election results
Parties and coalitions		Votes	%	Seats
Democratic Party (Partito Democratico)	PD	37,027	28.89%	17
Italy of Values (Italia dei Valori)	IdV	8,628	6.73%	4
Federation of the Greens–Bettin List (Federazione dei Verdi)	FdV	4,816	3.76%	2
Italian Socialist Party (Partito Socialista Italiano)	PSI	4,800	3.75%	2
Federation of the Left (Federazione della Sinistra)	FdS	4,244	3.31%	1
Others		6,177	4.82%	2
Orsoni coalition (Centre-left)		65,692	51.26%	28
The People of Freedom (Il Popolo della Libertà)	PdL	29,179	22.77%	10
Lega Nord	LN	14,297	11.16%	4
Brunetta List (Lista Brunetta)	LB	8,499	6.63%	2
Others		2,381	1.86%	0
Brunetta coalition (Centre-right)		54,356	42.41%	17
Five Star Movement (Movimento Cinque Stelle)	M5S	4,189	3.27%	1
Others		3,928	3.07%	0
Total		128,165	100%	46
Votes cast / turnout		151,554	68.64%	
Registered voters		220,791		
Source: Ministry of the Interior

Candidate	Party	Coalition	First round	
Candidate	Party	Coalition	Votes	%
Giorgio Orsoni	PD	PD-IdV-FdV-FdS-PSI	75,403	51.13
Renato Brunetta	PdL	PdL-LN-PP	62,833	42.61
Marco Gavagnin	M5S		4,608	3.12
Others			4,621	3.13
Eligible voters			220,791	100.00
Voted			151,554	68.64
Blank or invalid ballots			4,089	
Total valid votes			147,465	

=== Mayoral and City Council election, 2015 ===
These elections were held on two rounds: the first on 31 May, the second on 14 June 2015.

Results

Candidate	Party	Coalition	First round		Second round	
Candidate	Party	Coalition	Votes	%	Votes	%
Felice Casson	PD	PD-SEL-FdV-PSI-CD	46,298	38.02	47,838	46.79
Luigi Brugnaro	Ind	FI-AP	34,790	28.57	54,405	53.21
Davide Scano	M5S		15,348	12.60		
Gian Angelo Bellati	LN		14,482	11.89		
Francesca Zaccariotto	FdI-AN		8,292	6.81		
Others			2,567	2.11		
Eligible voters			211,720	100.00	211,720	100.00
Voted			126,631	59.81	103,827	49.04
Blank or invalid ballots			4,854		1,584	
Total valid votes			121,777		102,243	

Summary of the 2015 Venice City Council election results
Parties and coalitions		Votes	%	Seats
Casson List (Lista Casson)	LC	19,991	17.10%	4
Democratic Party (Partito Democratico)	PD	19,667	16.83%	4
Left Ecology Freedom-Greens (Sinistra Ecologia e Libertà - Verdi)	SEL-FdV	1,845	1.58%	0
Venice Common Good (Venezia Bene Comune)	VBC	1,562	1.34%	0
Italian Socialist Party (Partito Socialista Italiano)	PSI	618	0.53%	0
Democratic Centre (Centro Democratico)	CD	365	0.31%	0
Casson coalition (Centre-left)		44,058	37.69%	8
Brugnaro List (Lista Brugnaro)	LB	24,352	20.83%	17
Forza Italia	FI	4,405	3.77%	3
Popular Area (Area Popolare)	AP	1,870	1.60%	1
Others		2,818	2.41%	1
Brugnaro coalition (Centre-right)		33,445	28.61%	(Note: Even if the coalition didn't receive the majority of votes, no other alliance was able to obtain overall more than 50% of votes. Once its mayoral candidate won the second round, the coalition was awarded the majority bonus granted by the electoral law to the alliance whose candidate is elected mayor.)22
Five Star Movement (Movimento Cinque Stelle)	M5S	15,009	12.84%	3
Lega Nord	LN	13,997	11.97%	2
Brothers of Italy (Fratelli d'Italia)	FdI	7,847	6.71%	1
Others		2,530	2.16%	0
Total		116,886	100%	36
Votes cast / turnout		126,631	59.81%	
Registered voters		211,720		
Source: Ministry of the Interior

=== Mayoral and City Council election, 2020 ===
These elections were scheduled to take place in June 2020 but then were postponed to 20–21 September 2020 due to the coronavirus pandemic.

Results

Summary of the 2020 Venice City Council election results
Parties and coalitions		Votes	%	Seats
Brugnaro List (Lista Brugnaro)	LB	37,914	31.67%	14
Lega	Lega	14,806	12.37%	5
Brothers of Italy (Fratelli d'Italia)	FdI	7,855	6.56%	2
Forza Italia	FI	3,255	2.72%	1
Others		1,148	0.96%	0
Brugnaro coalition (Centre-right)		64,968	54.28%	22
Democratic Party (Partito Democratico)	PD	22,962	19.18%	8
Green Progressive Venice (Venezia Verde Progressista)	VVD	5,907	4.93%	1
Italia Viva	IV	4,308	3.60%	1
Italy in Common–Volt (Italia in Comune–Volt)	IC–V	952	0.80%	0
Others		789	0.66%	0
Baretta coalition (Centre-left)		34,918	29.17%	10
Land and Water 2020 (Terra e Acqua 2020)		4,847	4.05%	1
Five Star Movement (Movimento Cinque Stelle)	M5S	4,716	4.05%	1
Party of Venetians (Partito dei Veneti)	PdV	4,228	3.53%	1
All the City Together! (Tutta la Città Insieme!)		4,104	3.42%	1
Others		1,906	1.59%	0
Total		119,687	100%	36
Votes cast / turnout		128,025	62.23%	
Registered voters		205,720		
Source: Ministry of the Interior

Candidate	Party	Coalition	First round	
Candidate	Party	Coalition	Votes	%
Luigi Brugnaro	Ind	FI-Lega-FdI	66,750	54.14
Pier Paolo Baretta	PD	PD-IV-EV-IC-V-PSI	36,092	29.27
Marco Gasparinetti	Ind		5,005	4.06
Sara Visman	M5S		4,822	3.91
Others			10,631	8.61
Eligible voters			205,720	100.00
Voted			128,025	62.23
Blank or invalid ballots			4,656	
Total valid votes			123,300	

=== Mayoral and City Council election, 2026 ===
These elections, originally scheduled to take place in September 2025, took place on 24–25 May 2026. According to the Italian law, since 2011 local elections can take place each year only between 15 April and 15 June.

Results

Summary of the 2026 Venice City Council election results
Parties and coalitions		Votes	%	Seats
Venturini List (Lista Venturini)	LV	32,046	30.11%	14
Brothers of Italy (Fratelli d'Italia)	FdI	13,726	12.90%	5
Lega	Lega	5,032	4.73%	2
Forza Italia	FI	2,653	2.49%	1
Others		1,399	1.32%	0
Venturini coalition (Centre-right)		54,856	51.54%	22
Democratic Party (Partito Democratico)	PD	26,444	24.84%	10
Greens and Left Alliance (Alleanza Verdi e Sinistra)	AVS	5,516	5.18%	1
Land and Water 2026 (Terra e Acqua 2026)		2,876	2.70%	1
Five Star Movement (Movimento Cinque Stelle)	M5S	2,779	2.61%	1
Others		3,742	3.51%	0
Martella coalition (Centre-left)		41,357	38.85%	13
ORA!		3,476	3.27%	1
Others		6,752	6.34%	0
Total		106,441	100%	36
Votes cast / turnout		112,776	55.90%	
Registered voters		201,713		
Source: Ministry of the Interior

Candidate	Party	Coalition	First round	
Candidate	Party	Coalition	Votes	%
Simone Venturini	Ind	FI-Lega-FdI-UDC	56,344	51.03
Andrea Martella	PD	PD-AVS-M5S-IV-+E-PSI-PRC	43,294	39.21
Michele Boldrin	ORA!		3,795	3.44
Giovanni Andrea Martini	Ind		2,332	2.11
Others			4,651	4.22
Eligible voters			201,713	100.00
Voted			112,767	55.90
Blank or invalid ballots			2,351	
Total valid votes			110,416	

Venturini V Martella V Boldrin by area
Area	Simone Venturini	Andrea Martella	Michele Boldrin	Others
Centro storico	8,414 34.83%	12,417 51.40%	826 3.41%	2,499 10.36%
Estuary	6,762 55.46%	4,146 34.00%	299 2.45%	985 8.09%
Mainland (Terraferma)	41,168 55.58%	26,731 36.08%	2,670 3.60%	3,499 4.74%

== Deputy Mayor ==
The office of the Deputy Mayor of Venice was officially created in 1993 with the adoption of the new local administration law. The Deputy Mayor is nominated and eventually dismissed by the Mayor.

	Deputy	Term start	Term end	Party	Mayor
1	Emilio Rosini	13 December 1993	17 November 1997	PDS	Cacciari
2	Michele Vianello	25 November 1997	25 January 2000	PDS; DS	Cacciari
2	Michele Vianello	12 May 2000	10 July 2001 (Note: Resigned.)	PDS; DS	Costa
3	Michele Mognato	10 July 2001	18 April 2005	DS	Costa
(2)	Michele Vianello	6 May 2005	8 April 2010	DS; PD	Cacciari
4	Sandro Simionato	16 April 2010	13 June 2014	PD	Orsoni
5	Luciana Colle	29 June 2015	26 September 2020	Ind	Brugnaro
6	Andrea Tomaello	6 October 2020	19 December 2025 (Note: Elected regional councillor.)	Lega	Brugnaro
7	Sergio Vallotto	19 December 2025	29 May 2026	Lega	Brugnaro
8	Francesca Zaccariotto	15 June 2026	Incumbent	FdI	Venturini
