= Fabio Berardini =

Italian politician (born 1990)

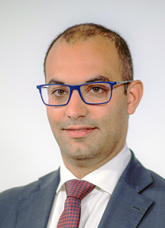
- Berardini in 2020

Member of the Chamber of Deputies
- In office 23 March 2018 – 12 October 2022
- Constituency: Abruzzo – P02

Personal details
- Born: 10 July 1990 (age 35)
- Party: Coraggio Italia (since 2021)

Fabio Berardini (born 10 July 1990) is an Italian politician. From 2018 to 2022, he was a member of the Chamber of Deputies. He previously served as a municipal councillor of Teramo.
