= Giorgio Orsoni =

Mayor of Venice, Italy, in 2010–2014

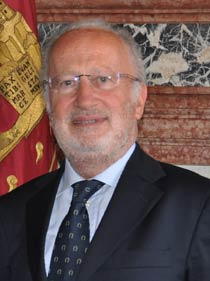

Mayor of Venice
- In office 8 April 2010 – 13 June 2014
- Preceded by: Massimo Cacciari
- Succeeded by: Luigi Brugnaro

Personal details
- Born: 29 August 1946 (age 79) Venice, Italy
- Party: Democratic Party

Giorgio Orsoni (born 29 August 1946) is an Italian lawyer, politician and a former mayor of Venice.

== Biography ==
Orsoni has been a lawyer by profession since 1972 and is Professor of administrative law at the University Ca 'Foscari of Venice. He has also been chairman of the Bar of Venice and president of the Union of Councils Triveneta Order.

From 1997 to 2003, he was the president of SAVE Engineering SpA Engineering Company Marco Polo Airport in Venice. From 2000 to 2003 was also a director of the Venice Biennale.

In the elections of 2010, he was elected mayor of Venice at the head of a coalition of the centre-left in the first round, defeating Minister Renato Brunetta, the candidate of the centre-right. According to The Times, Brunetta had been strongly favored to win the election.

== Controversies ==
Orsoni was placed under house arrest on 4 June 2014 on accusations of alleged violation of the law on Parties' financing. After confessing and reaching a plea deal with prosecutors, Orsoni was allowed to end house arrest.
