= Paolo Costa (politician) =

Italian politician

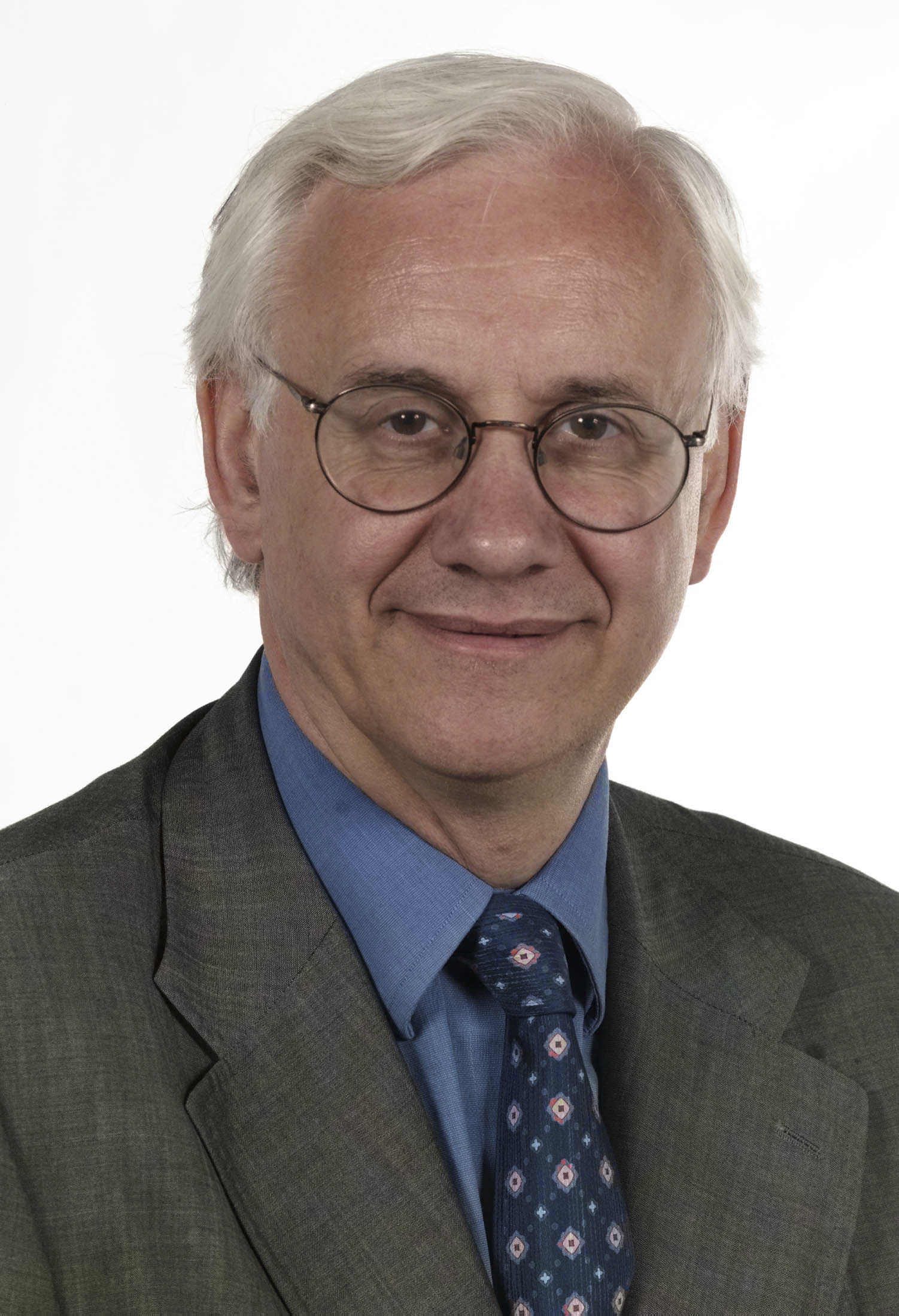
- Costa in 1999

Member of the European Parliament
- In office 1999–2009
- Constituency: North-East Italy

Mayor of Venice
- In office 30 April 2000 – 18 April 2005
- Preceded by: Massimo Cacciari
- Succeeded by: Massimo Cacciari

Minister of Public Works
- In office 20 November 1996 – 21 October 1998
- Prime Minister: Romano Prodi
- Preceded by: Antonio Di Pietro
- Succeeded by: Enrico Luigi Micheli

Personal details
- Born: 23 July 1943 (age 83) Venice, Italy
- Party: Democratic Party
- Education: Ca' Foscari University
- Profession: Economist; University professor

Paolo Costa (born 23 July 1943) is the president of the Venice Port Authority. He was elected as an Italian member of the European Parliament in 1999 and 2004, and since 2003, he has been the chair of the Committee on Transport and Tourism at the European Parliament. He was elected on the Olive Tree ticket and sat with the Alliance of Liberals and Democrats for Europe group.

Before entering politics, he held numerous posts in planning and economics at Ca' Foscari University of Venice, University of Reading, U.K., and New York University. He served as pro-rector of Ca' Foscari University in Venice (1992–1996). He was a member of the Venice City Council (1997–2000) and mayor of Venice (2000–2005). He was chairman of the Council of AISRE (Italian Association of Regional Science) (1982–1984); member of the Scientific Committee for the Italian General Transport Plan (1985–1987), and Italian Minister for Public Works (1996–1998).

He received the honour of Knight of the Grand Cross, Order of Merit of the Italian Republic in 1998.
