= Il Nuovo Postiglione =

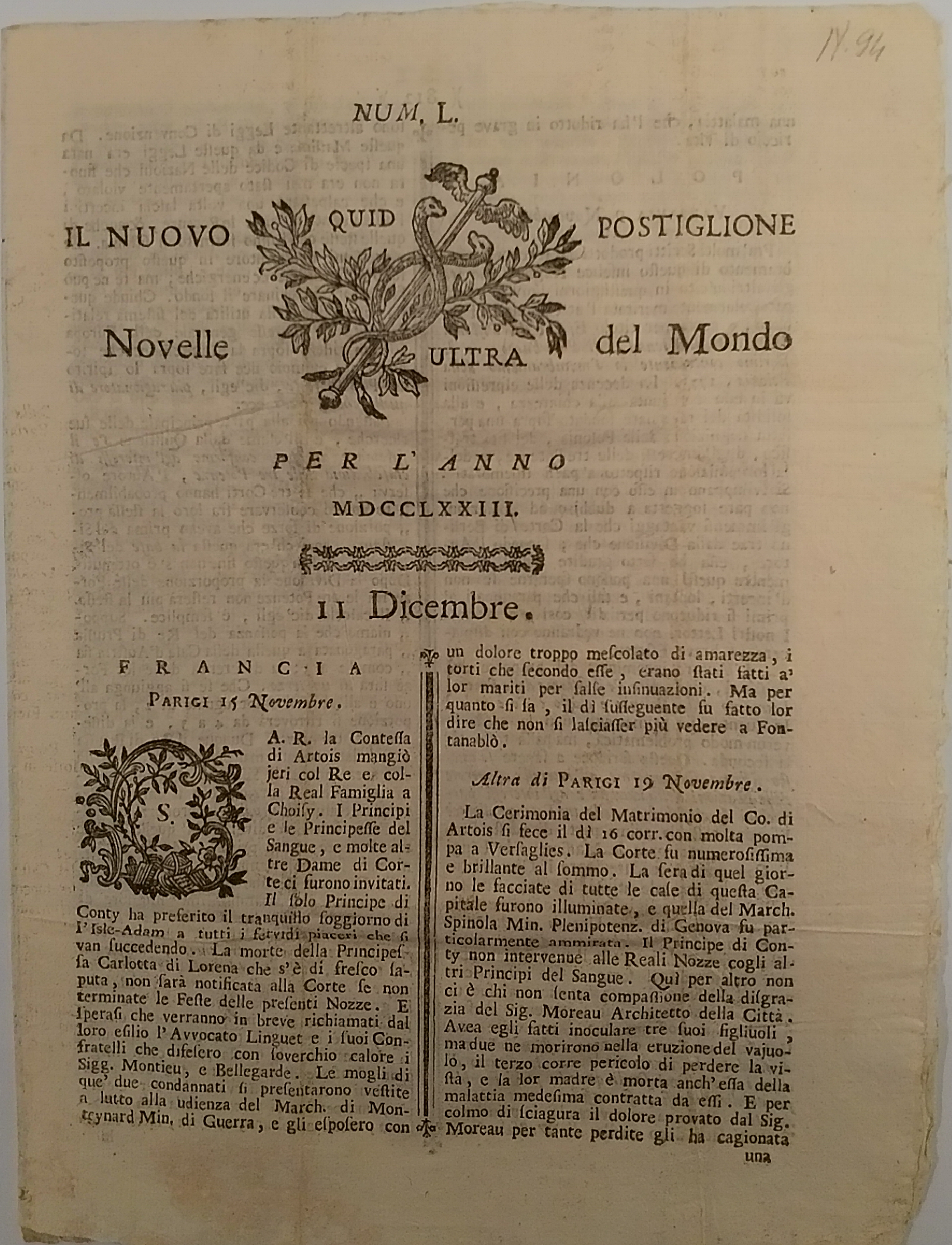
- a number of 1773
- Founder: Giambattista Albrizzi
- Publisher: Albrizzi family (up to 1806)
- Founded: 1741
- Ceased publication: June 22, 1816
- Language: Italian
- City: Venice

Il Nuovo Postiglione (Italian for The new postilion, initially known as Il Postiglione Universale) was a newspaper published in Venice from 1741 to 1816. With the exception of some short-lived and thematic gazettes, the Nuovo Postiglione remained the only newspaper covering foreign affairs printed in Venice from 1741 to 1778.

== History ==
On 31 December 1740 the government of the Republic of Venice authorized the publisher Giambattista Albrizzi to print in Venice a translations of the gazette L’Avant-Coureur (Note: The L’Avant-Coureur of Frankfurt was edited by Franz Varrentrapp since April 1734) of Frankfurt. Since 15 January 1751 Giambattista Albrizzi was authorized to use as sources also the Gazzetta d’Amsterdam, the Diario Ordinario of Roma, the Gazzetta di Mantova, and the Nuove di diverse corti e Paesi of Lugano. The newspaper had at that time the title Postiglione Universale.

Since 1759 the Nuovo Postiglione already had such new title and an image of a caduceus with the Latin motto Quid Ultra placed nearby the title. It was issued weekly. Different headlines have been used during its publishing life, such as Novelle del Mondo (news of the world) or Compendio de' foglio più accreditati d'Europa (Summary of the most reliable papers of Europe). This newspaper, on two columns, followed the usual style of the gazettes of early 18th-century, listing the news without title under the town and date where they were obtained.

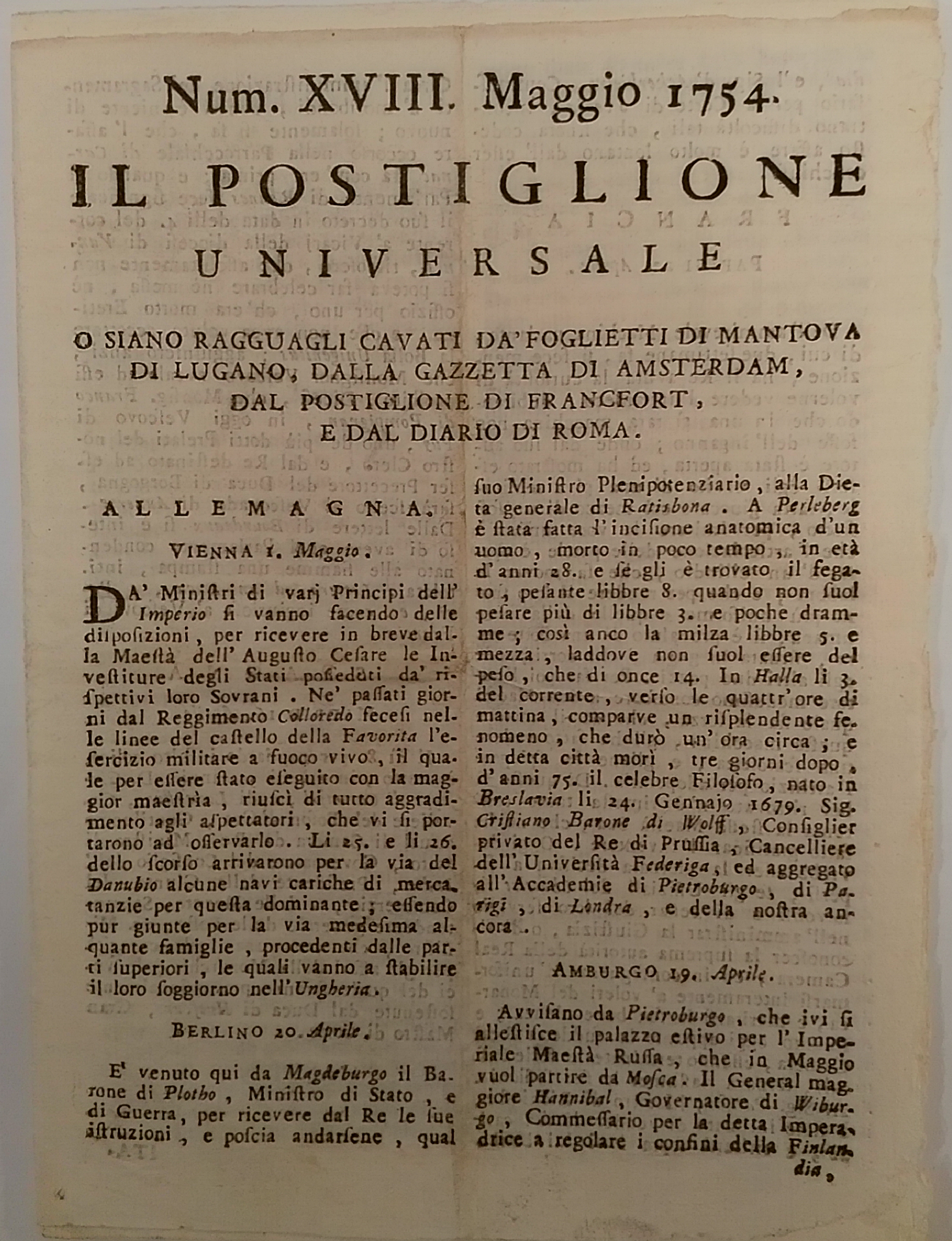
A number of 1754

The content of the Nuovo Postiglione was almost entirely dedicated to foreign affairs and military campaigns. In 1777 it started to have sometime a supplement (“additional paper”) dedicated to a some particular news.

On 28 August 1778 Antonio Graziosi started to publish the first concurrent: the newspaper Notizie del mondo. In September 1781 the Nuovo Postiglione started to advertise other books of the same publisher, and it became issued two times a week, even if this change was formally authorized only in 1792. From 22 May 1797 it was published every day but Sunday, on 7 June 1800 it returned bi-weekly, on 28 June 1808 it was published three times a week, a periodicity it maintained except from 1810 to 1812 when it was printed four times a week.

Giambattista Albrizzi remained the publisher until his death in 1777 (except from 1754 to 1758 when the newspaper was owned by the actual editor, Girolamo Zanetti). After Giambattista Albrizzi the newspaper passed to his son Angelo and since 1798 to his grand-nephew Giambattista. In 1811 the Albrizzi lost the privilege to publish such newspaper due to a dispute, and the Nuovo Postiglione was later published by Antonio Caminer. By order of the government of the Kingdom of Italy, in March 1812 the publications were interrupted along with all other newspapers in Venice, substituted by the Giornale dipartimentale dell'Adriatico published however always under the direction of Antonio Caminer. It was resumed on 2 January 1816.

The Nuovo Postiglione was forcefully aligned to the political power in Venice: it sided for the Republic of Venice against Napoleon, after 1797 it supported the French and after 1815 it exalted the Austrians. The last number was published on 22 June 1816.
