= Massimo Cacciari =

Italian politician (born 1944)

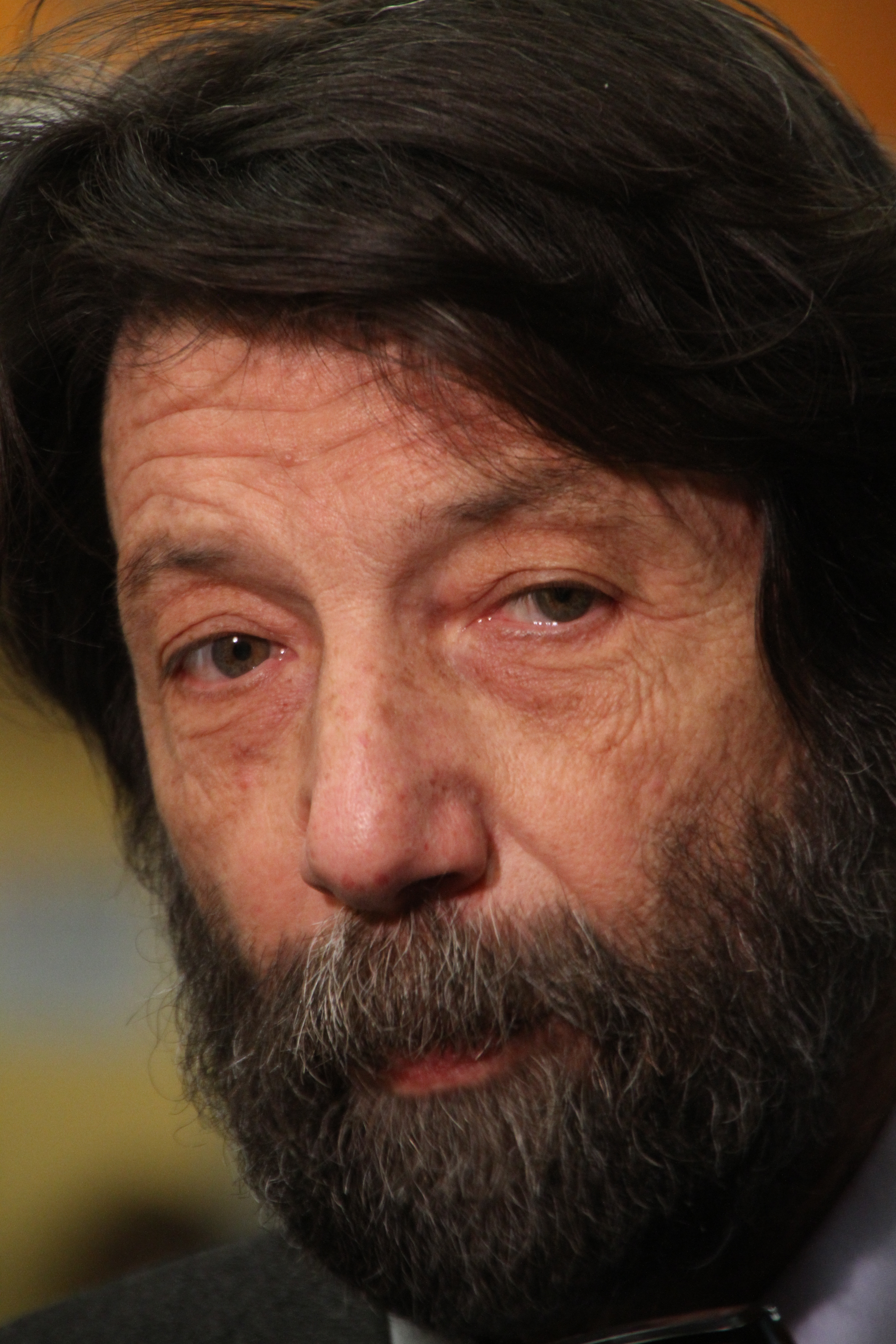
- Cacciari in 2012

Mayor of Venice
- In office 18 April 2005 – 8 April 2010
- Preceded by: Paolo Costa
- Succeeded by: Giorgio Orsoni
- In office 9 December 1993 – 25 January 2000
- Preceded by: Ugo Bergamo
- Succeeded by: Paolo Costa

Member of the European Parliament
- In office 20 July 1999 – 26 May 2000
- Constituency: North-West Italy

Member of the Chamber of Deputies
- In office 5 July 1976 – 11 July 1983
- Constituency: Venice

Personal details
- Born: 5 June 1944 (age 82) Venice, Kingdom of Italy
- Party: PCI (1976–1984); Independent (1993–1997); MNE (1997–1999); Dem (1999–2002); DL (2002–2007); PD (2007–2009); Independent (since 2009)

Massimo Cacciari (Italian: [ˈmassimo katˈtʃaːri]; born 5 June 1944) is an Italian philosopher and politician who served as Mayor of Venice from 1993 to 2000 and from 2005 to 2010.

== Biography ==
Born in Venice, Cacciari graduated in philosophy from the University of Padua (1967), where he also received his doctorate, writing a thesis on Immanuel Kant's Critique of Judgment. In 1985, he became professor of Aesthetics at the Architecture Institute of Venice. In 2002, he founded the Department of Philosophy at the Vita-Salute San Raffaele University in Milan, where he was appointed Dean of the Department in 2005. Cacciari has founded several philosophical reviews and published essays centered on the "negative thought" inspired by authors like Friedrich Nietzsche, Martin Heidegger and Ludwig Wittgenstein.

In the 1980s, Cacciari also worked with the Italian composer of avant-garde contemporary/classical music Luigi Nono. Nono, a political activist whose music represented a revolt against bourgeois cultural constructs, collaborated with Cacciari, who arranged the philosophical lyrics on such works of Nono's as Das Atmende Klarsein, Io, and the opera Prometeo.

After a brief period of engagement with circles around Potere Operaio, a radical left-wing worker's party, Cacciari joined the Italian Communist Party (PCI). In the 1970s he was responsible for industrial politics for the PCI Veneto section and, in 1976, he was elected to the Italian Chamber of Deputies, where he was a member of the Parliamentary commission for industry (1976–1983).

After the death of Enrico Berlinguer (1984), Cacciari left the Communist Party and switched to more moderate positions, although he never left the centre-left coalition. In 1993 he was elected mayor of Venice, a position he held until 2000. He was also put forth as the future national leader of the coalition, later named The Olive Tree, but his defeat in the 2000 election as governor of the Veneto region made this occasion wane. However, in a surprise move in 2005, Cacciari again ran for mayor of Venice, and was elected by a slight majority against former magistrate Felice Casson, the very magistrate who years earlier had famously indicted Mayor Cacciari for criminal negligence arising out of the 1996 fire at Venice's La Fenice opera house. Mayor Cacciari was later acquitted of all charges in that case.

== Thought ==
The volumes Icone della Legge (Icons of the Law) and The Necessary Angel (1986) dedicate few pages to the philosophy of the icon and the outcome of the thought of the Russian mystic Pavel Aleksandrovič Florensky. Cacciari affirms that angels in Christianity derive from the angelology of the ancient Babylonia.

Emanuele Severino, Gianni Vattimo, Massimo Cacciari and Umberto Galimberti have been described as "neopagan" philosophers insofar as they adhere to "a reading of Christianity as a historical moment of great importance for the West, but now outdated" (rather than in the vernacular sense of the term).

== Works with English translations ==
- Architecture and Nihilism: On the Philosophy of Modern Architecture, Yale University Press, 1993
- The Necessary Angel, State University of New York Press, 1994
- Posthumous People: Vienna at the Turning Point, Stanford University Press, 1996
- The Unpolitical. Essays on the Radical Critique of Political Reason, Yale University Press, 2009
- Europe and Empire: On the Political Forms of Globalization, Fordham University Press, 2016
- The Withholding Power. An Essay on Political Theology, Bloomsbury Academic, 2018

== Electoral history ==
| Election | House | Constituency | Party | Votes | Result |
|---|---|---|---|---|---|
| 1976 | Chamber of Deputies | Venice–Treviso | PCI | 11,308 | Elected |
| 1979 | Chamber of Deputies | Venice–Treviso | PCI | 14,262 | Elected |
| 1999 | European Parliament | North-west Italy | Dem | 74,049 | Elected |
