= Notizie del mondo (Venice) =

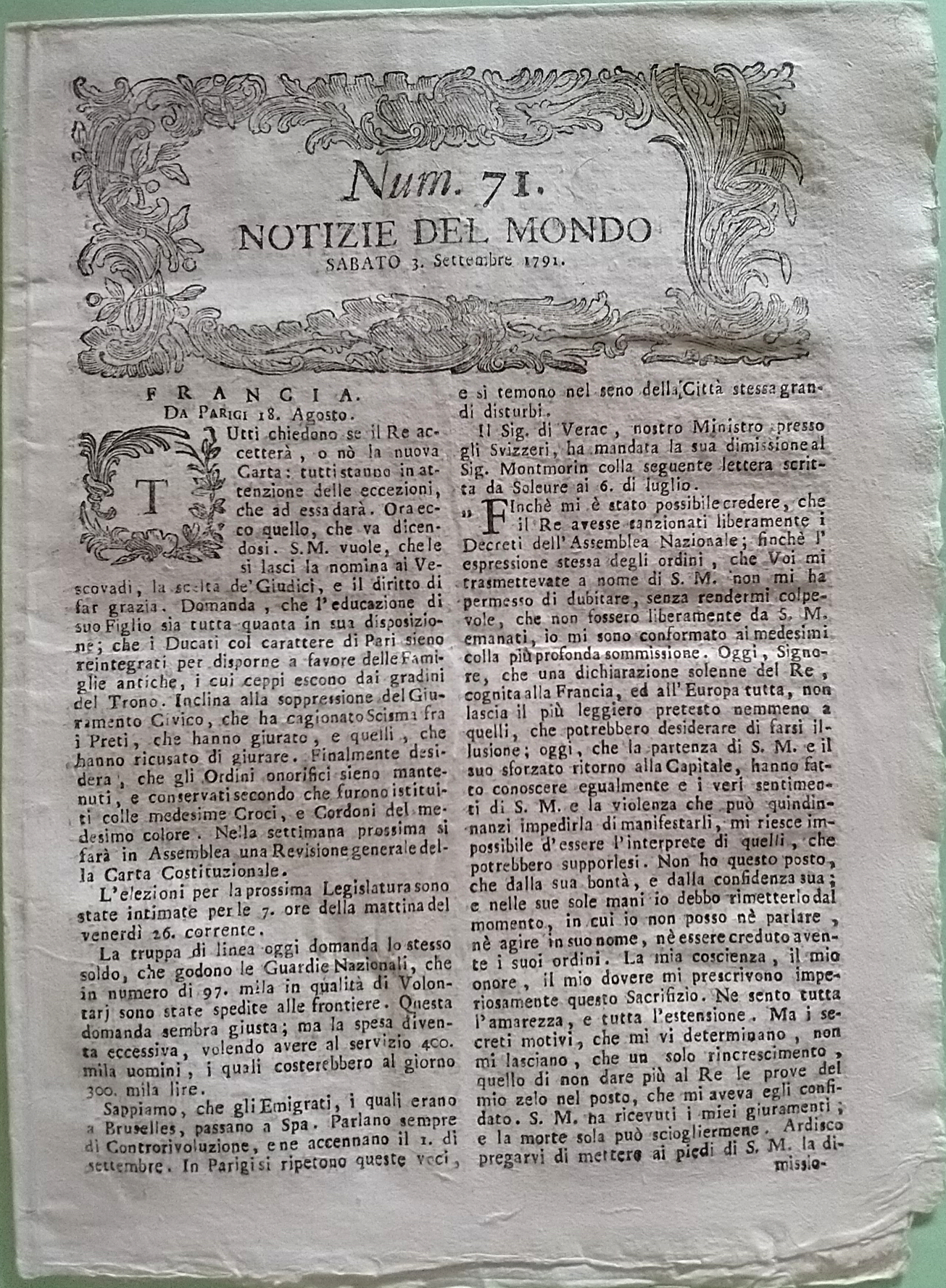
- a number of 1791
- Publisher: Antonio Graziosi
- Founded: November 28, 1778
- Ceased publication: December 30, 1815
- Language: Italian
- City: Venice

Notizie del mondo (Italian for News of the world) was a newspaper published in Venice from 1778 to 1812 and later in 1815. Along with the Nuovo Postiglione, it was the main newspaper covering foreign affairs printed in Venice in that time, arriving to circulation of more than two thousand copies.

== History ==
On 22 August 1778, the government of the Republic of Venice authorized Antonio Graziosi (Note: Antonio Graziosi was born in Venice in 1741. In 1762, he opened a little bookshop in Venice and already in 1764 he already had permissions of printing fourteen titles. In 1768, he was sentenced to six months imprisonment for having sold copies of the Ode a Priapo, considered too lascivious. He died in Venice in 1818.) to publish a new newspaper. Because the existing newspaper Il Nuovo Postiglione already had the formal monopoly, the permission was granted subject to it being only a reprint of a foreign newspaper.

The first issue of Notizie del mondo of Venice was published on 28 November 1778. It stated it was a reprint, with additions, of the newspaper with the same name published in Florence since 1768. Notizie del mondo of Venice had initially on its first page two dates, the date of Florence and the actual date of printing in Venice. The content was, however, completely independent from the Florence newspaper. From the first number of 1779, the Venetian Notizie del mondo left the graphic design of the Florentine Notizie del mondo. From the first number of 1785, the double dates were no longe used and, from issue 85 of the same year, the indication of being a reprint disappeared.

The Notizie del mondo of Venice had a good reception from the public. The circulation in 1782 exceeded 2,000 copies. It was mainly sold by annual or biannual subscription in all the main towns of north Italy, but only in Venice was it possible to buy single issues. The annual cost of a subscription was one sequin.

The Notizie del mondo covered mainly foreign political affair, with fresh news from France. Graziosi's editorial line was slightly in favor of the French Revolution and against the political line of the Patriarchate of Venice.

From 1789, the editor-in-chief was Giuseppe Compagnoni, who resigned in 1794 when censorship became more stiff after the revolutionary events in France. After Compagnoni, the editor-in-chief became the Sicilian abbot Saverio Scrofani.

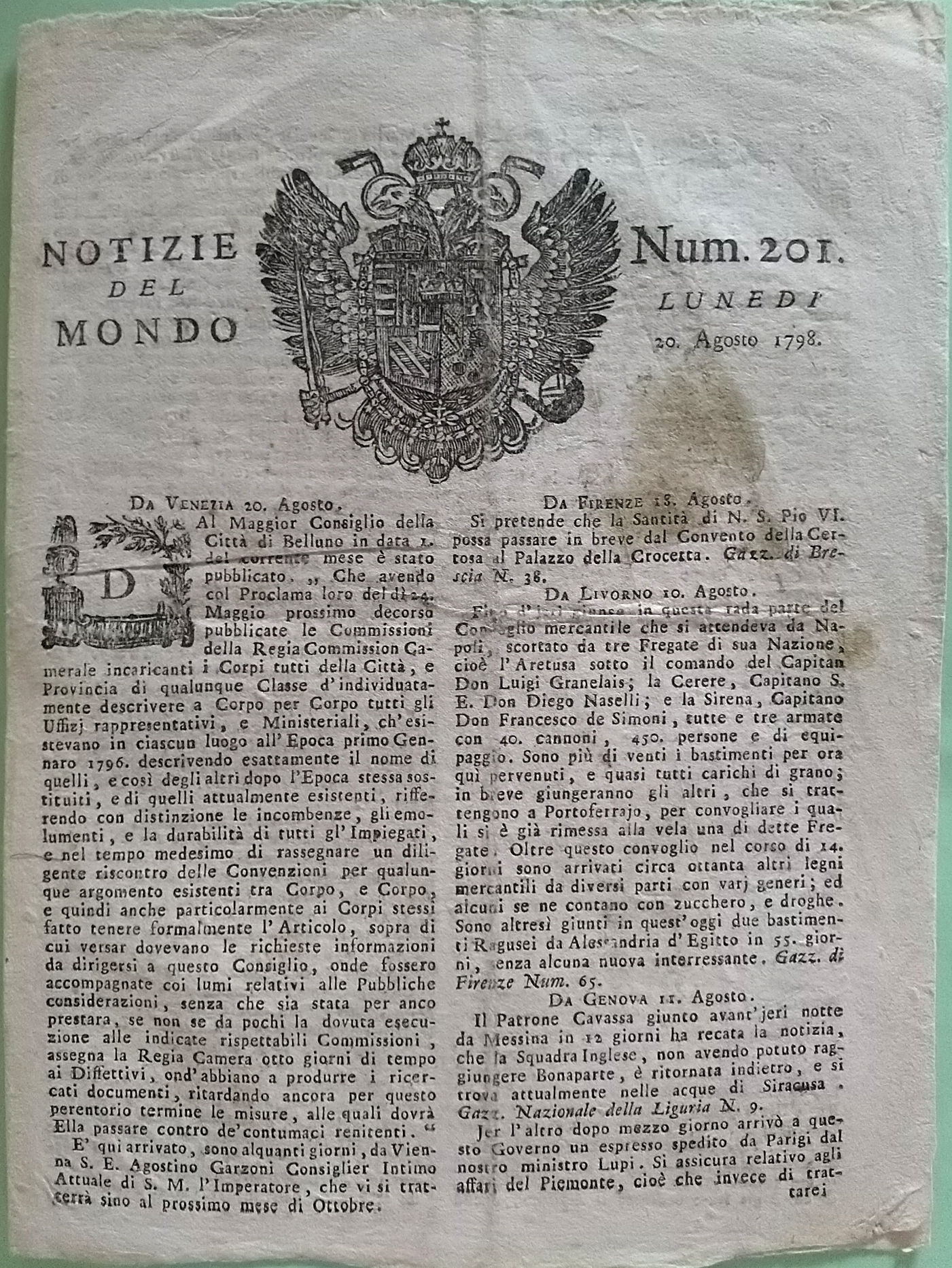
A number of 1798

Notizie del mondo was published twice a week up to 22 May 1797 and daily up to 1800 when it returned to twice weekly. From 5 July 1808, it was published three times a week, from 1809 the periodicity changed many times and in 1815 it was again published daily. It was usually eight pages when published twice weekly and four pages when published more often.

By order of the government of the Kingdom of Italy, on 14 March 1812, publication was interrupted along with all other newspapers in Venice, replaced by the Giornale dipartimentale dell'Adriatico published, however, still by Graziosi under the direction of Antonio Caminer.

The Notizie del mondo was resumed in early 1815 and published daily that year. The last number appeared on 30 December 1815.
