= Luigi Brugnaro =

Italian politician (born 1961)

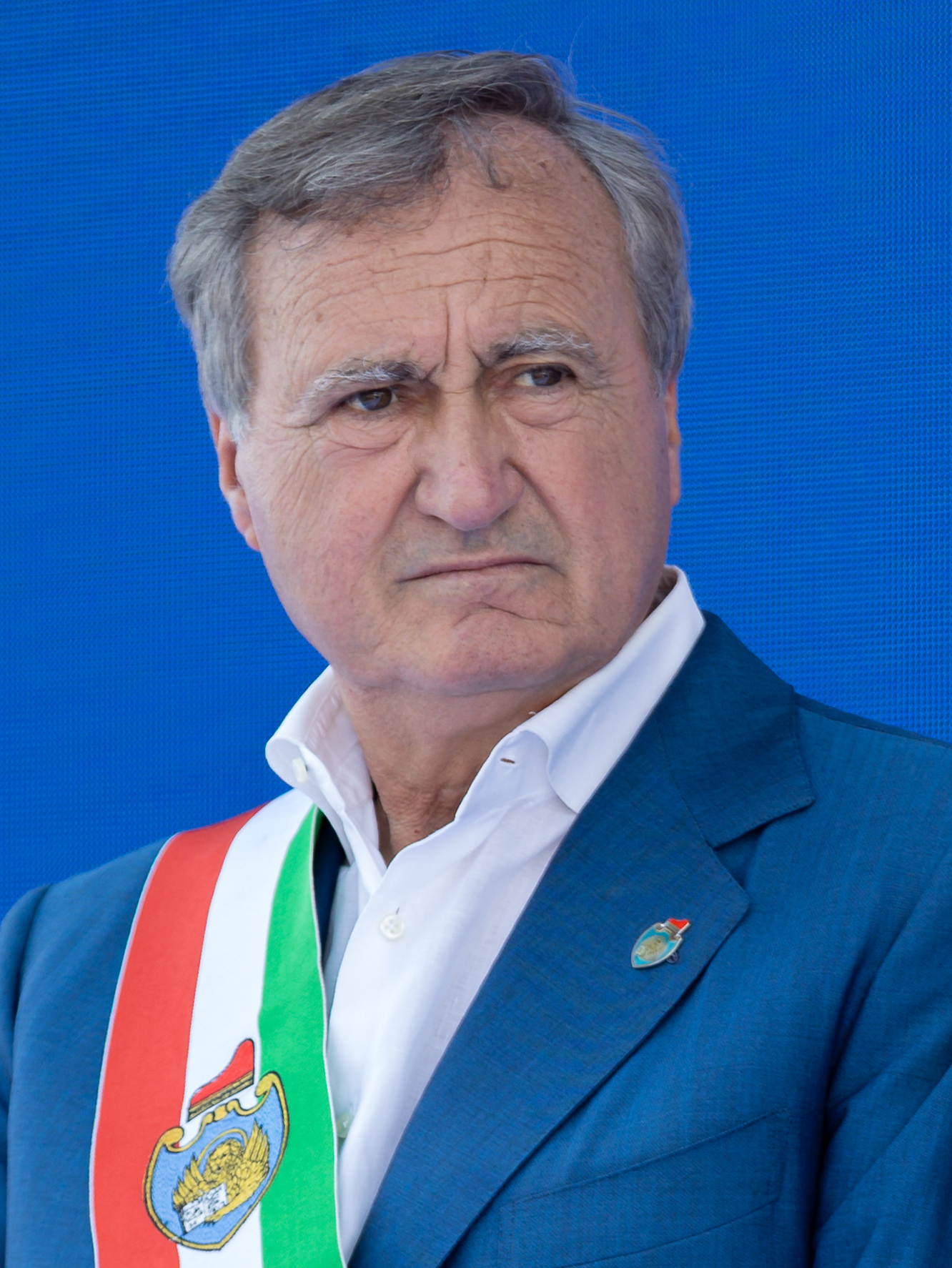

Mayor of Venice
- In office 15 June 2015 – 29 May 2026
- Preceded by: Giorgio Orsoni
- Succeeded by: Simone Venturini

President of Coraggio Italia
- Incumbent
- Assumed office 14 July 2021
- Preceded by: Office established

Personal details
- Born: 13 September 1961 (age 64) Mirano, Italy
- Party: Coraggio Italia
- Education: Iuav University
- Profession: Entrepreneur

Luigi Brugnaro (born 13 September 1961) is an Italian politician and entrepreneur who was the mayor of Venice from 2015 to 2026. Since July 2021, he is also president of Coraggio Italia (CI), a political party affiliated with the centre-right coalition.

== Biography ==
=== Entrepreneurial career ===
Brugnaro graduated in architecture at IUAV. He has been owner of the Reyer Venezia Mestre basketball team, a past chairman of Confindustria Venice, and also a former president of Assolavoro.

=== Mayor of Venice ===
Brugnaro ran for the office as an independent politician, assuming office on 15 June 2015.

Brugnaro has attracted controversy via his banning of 49 books about discrimination and homosexuality from the city's schools, including a French book on gay parenting entitled Jean Has Two Mums, and in declaring that there will be no gay pride parade in Venice. Germane to these actions and statements he has engaged in a series of verbal back and forths with the entertainer and activist Elton John, who maintains a home in the city.

On 24 August 2017, Mayor Brugnaro ordered Italian police to shoot anyone shouting "Allāhu akbar" on sight. In his statement, he said: "We need to increase our security when it comes to terrorism. We had four would be terrorists arrested in Venice a few months ago who wanted to blow up the Rialto bridge. They said they wanted to go and meet Allah so we will send them straight to Allah without having to throw them off the bridge, we will just shoot them."

In 2018, Brugnaro successfully spearheaded a drive to charge a fee to be applied to day visitors to Venice. The fee approved by the Italian Parliament will vary depending upon the time of year of one's visit. Brugnaro had said of the measure, "The tax will ...allow us to manage the city better and to keep it clean... and allow Venetians to live with more decorum".

After a large luxury passenger liner crashed into a cruise ship terminal in Venice during the first week of June 2019, Brugnaro said, "Once again it is shown that big ships cannot cross the Giudecca Canal."

During the repeated flooding of the ancient city in 2019, Brugnaro said "Venice is on its knees" in describing the catastrophe and labeled the cause as global warming in stating that "These are the effects of climate changes." Brugnaro is the owner of a Ferretti 1,000 luxury yacht.

On 27 May 2021, he founded along with Giovanni Toti, Coraggio Italia, a new party joined by former members of Forza Italia, Cambiamo!, the League, and Democratic Centre.

Regarding Russia's presence in the 2026 Venice Biennale, Luigi Brugnaro has chosen to respect the independence of both the Biennale's organizers and its jury. Nevertheless, he also declared that the Russian pavilion will be closed immediately if it features any political propaganda.
