= Coraggio Italia =

Italian political party

- President: Luigi Brugnaro
- Vice President: Michaela Biancofiore
- Founded: 27 May 2021; 5 years ago
- Split from: Forza Italia
- Headquarters: Via Gaspare Spontini 22, Rome
- Ideology: Liberal conservatism
- Political position: Centre to centre-right
- National affiliation: Electoral list: Us Moderates (2022–2023); Coalition: Centre-right coalition
- Colours: Fuchsia; Indigo
- Chamber of Deputies: 1 / 400
- Senate: 1 / 205
- European Parliament: 0 / 76
- Regional Councils: 0 / 896
- Conference of Regions: 0 / 21

Website
- coraggioitalia.it

Coraggio Italia (lit. 'Courage Italy', also translatable as 'Cheer up Italy', CI) is a liberal-conservative political party in Italy, led by Luigi Brugnaro.

== History ==
In February 2021, amid the formation of Mario Draghi's national unity government, Cambiamo! (C!), a liberal-conservative party led by Giovanni Toti, president of Liguria, started to attract new members from the more centrist wing of Silvio Berlusconi's Forza Italia (FI).

In May 2021, Toti and Luigi Brugnaro, mayor of Venice, announced the formation of a new political party mainly composed by dissidents of FI, as well as Gaetano Quagliariello's Identity and Action (an associate party of C!), splinters from other parties, notably including three deputies previously affiliated with the centre-left Democratic Centre (CD). Brugnaro was appointed party president, while deputy Marco Marin, senator Gaetano Quagliariello and Toti vice presidents. During the press conference in which he and Toti launched the new party, Brugnaro thanked Berlusconi, describing him as a "brave leader", but also added that the centre-right "has to move on, it is another era".

In the 2021 Calabrian regional election, the party obtained 5.7% of the vote and two regional councillors.

In less than a year, CI, which had failed to attract substantial support countrywide, according to opinion polls, experienced an internal crisis. On one side Toti launched the project of a new political party named Italy in the Centre (IaC), on the other side Brugnaro rejected establishment politics and wanted to continue to be part of the centre-right coalition. In February 2022 CI's sub-group within the Mixed Group, previously named "IDeA–Cambiamo!–Europeanists", was re-named "Italy in the Centre". In March, a federation between Coraggio Italia and Italy of the Centre was announced, stating that they would have different organisations and parliamentary groupings.

In the 2022 local elections, CI and IaC ran separately in most places. CI obtained relevant results only in Veneto, Brugnaro's home-region, most notably 5.2% in Verona and 4.4% in Padua, while IaC won 9.2% in Genoa, 8.5% in La Spezia, 3.7% in Rieti, 5.2% in L'Aquila and 4.3% in Catanzaro.

In late June 2022, CI and IaC formally split both in the Chamber of Deputies and the Senate. The joint parliamentary group in the Chamber was dissolved, while six other deputies, including vice president Marin, left the party, founding a new party called Vinciamo Italia, and CI was left with seven deputies (led by Emilio Carelli) and two senators (Andrea Causin and Marinella Pacifico).

In July 2022, a new sub-group named after CI was formed within the Mixed Group of the Chamber of Deputies. The group was led by Fabio Berardini and included 10 deputies: 8 members of CI (not including Carelli) and two representatives of the Associative Movement of Italians Abroad (MAIE). Contextually, in the Senate, a new sub-group composed of three senators, including two senators of CI and one of the MAIE, was formed.

In the run-up of the 2022 general election CI first formed a joint list with Union of the Centre (UdC), then it was a founding member of Us Moderates (NM), a broader joint list within the centre-right coalition, along with the UdC, IaC and Us with Italy (NcI).

In June 2023, Brugnaro announced that CI was no longer part of NM.

In the 2024 European Parliament election, CI will support FI.

== Former member parties ==
| Party | Main ideology | Leader |
|---|---|---|
| Cambiamo! (C!) | Liberal conservatism | Giovanni Toti |
| Identity and Action (IDeA) | Christian democracy | Gaetano Quagliariello |

== Leadership ==
- President: Luigi Brugnaro (2021–present)
- Vice President: Marco Marin / Gaetano Quagliariello / Giovanni Toti (2021–2022), Michaela Biancofiore (2022–present)
- Leader in the Chamber of Deputies: Marco Marin (2021–2022), Fabio Berardini (2022–present)
- Leader in the Senate: Paolo Romani (2021–2022), Andrea Causin (2022–present)

== Election results ==
=== Italian Parliament ===
| Election | Leader | Chamber of Deputies | | | | | Senate of the Republic | | | | |
| Election | Leader | Votes | % | Seats | +/– | Position | Votes | % | Seats | +/– | Position |
|---|---|---|---|---|---|---|---|---|---|---|---|
| 2022 | Luigi Brugnaro | Into NM | | 1 / 400 | New | 12th | Into NM | | 1 / 200 | New | 13th |
