= Andrea Martella =

Italian politician

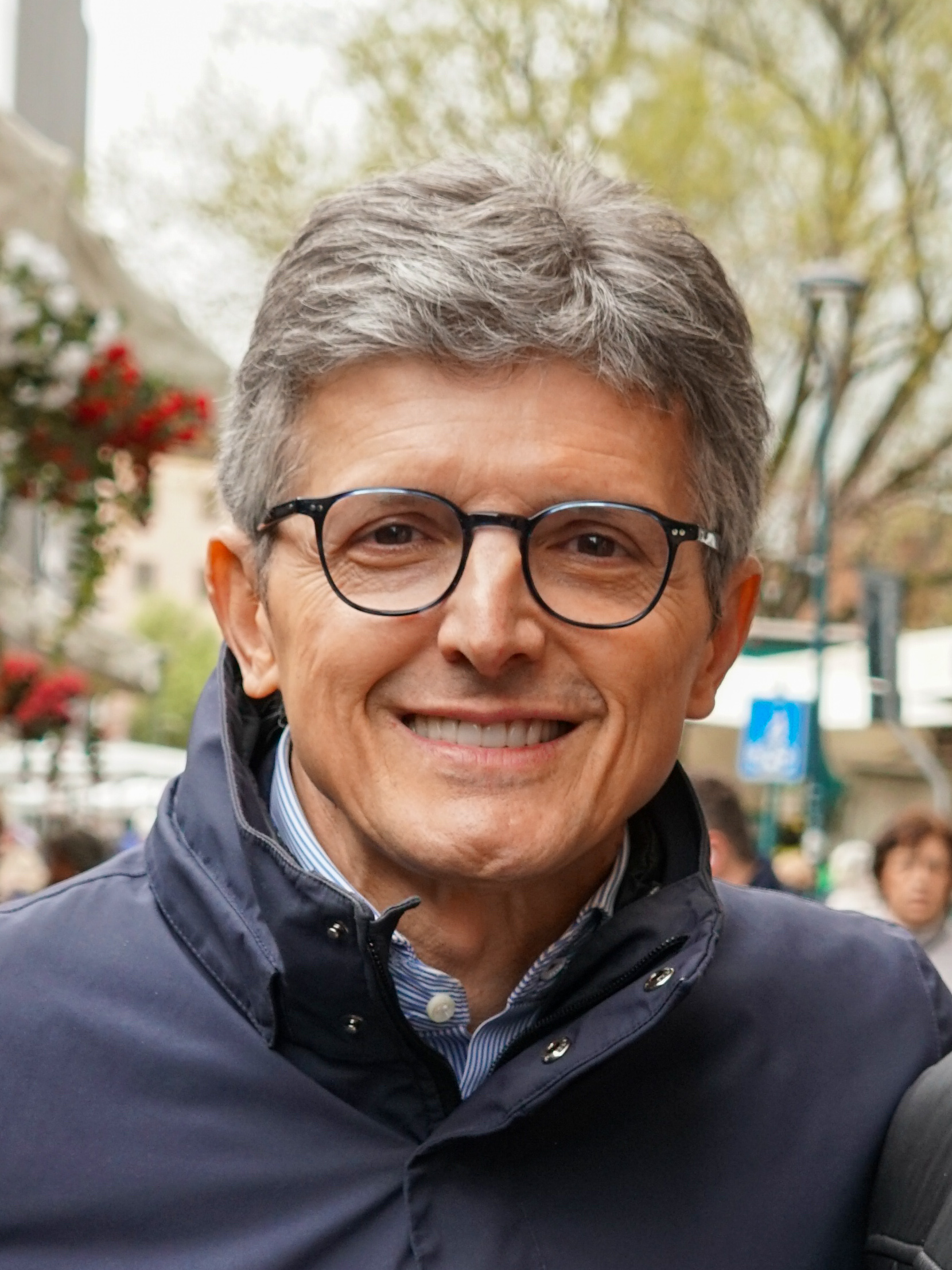

Member of the Senate of the Republic
- Incumbent
- Assumed office 13 October 2022
- Constituency: Veneto

Member of the Chamber of Deputies
- In office 30 May 2001 – 22 March 2018
- Constituency: Veneto

Personal details
- Born: 27 August 1968 (age 58) Portogruaro, Italy
- Education: Ca' Foscari University of Venice
- Occupation: Politician

Andrea Martella (born 27 August 1968) is an Italian politician.

== Biography ==
He was elected in 2001 to the Chamber of Deputies, reconfirmed in 2006, 2008 and 2013 respectively.

Martella was secretary of the Democrats of the Left provincial federation of Venice. With the Democrats of the Left he has taken on various positions at national level: in 2003 he was appointed Deputy Head of the Economics Department, in 2005 he was Coordinator of the Commission for the Electoral Program of the Democrats of the Left and in 2006 Head of the Department for Productive Activities.

With the birth of Democratic Party, he became Coordinator for the constituent phase for the North National Head of the North in the Veltroni National Secretariat. Between 2008 and 2009 he held the role of Minister of Infrastructure and Transport in the shadow government of the Democratic Party. During the Legislature XVII of Italy he was vice president of the PD group of Deputies and was also part of the Italian parliamentary delegation to the NATO Parliamentary Assembly as well as being a member of the Chamber's commission for productive activities, trade and tourism.

From 2019 to 2021 he held the position of Undersecretary of State to the Presidency of the Council of Ministers with responsibility for Information and Publishing.
