= Members of the Regional Council of Veneto, 2015–2020 =

The X Legislature of the Regional Council of Veneto, the legislative assembly of Veneto, Italy was inaugurated in June 2015, following the 2015 regional election, and ended in October 2020. Of the 51 members, 49 were elected in provincial constituencies by proportional representation using the largest remainder method with a Droop quota and open lists, while the remaining two were the elected President and the runner-up The winning coalition won a bonus of seats in order to make sure the elected President had a majority in the Council.

Roberto Ciambetti (Liga Veneta–Lega Nord) was the President of the Council for the entire term, while Luca Zaia (Liga Veneta–Lega Nord) served as President of Veneto at the head of his second government.

== Composition ==
=== Strength of political groups ===
Distribution of Seats in the Regional Council
Political Group	Leader	2015	2020
Liga Veneta–Lega Nord	Nicola Finco	11	12
Zaia for President (Note: All the group members were affiliated to Liga Veneta–Lega Nord. See https://www.larena.it/territori/citt%C3%A0/valdegamberipassa-nel-gruppo-misto-1.5531130.) (Note: Three members left the group for technical reasons: Nicola Finco in order to lead the group of Liga Veneta–Lega Nord, Stefano Valdegamberi to balance the composition of the Mixed Group, and Fabiano Barbisan to help the formation of the Venetian Centre-Right group.)	Silvia Rizzotto	13	10
Venetian Democratic Party	Alessandra Moretti / Stefano Fracasso	9	7
Five Star Movement	rotational leadership	5	4
Brothers of Italy (Note: The group was originally composed of just one member, Sergio Berlato, who left in February 2020 in order to become an MEP. He was replaced by Joe Formaggio. Contextually, the group was joined by Andrea Bassi and Stefano Casali, splinters of Tosi List for Veneto and, later, founding members of Venetian Centre-Right. The party counts two more councillors, Elena Donazzan and Massimo Giorgetti, who were splinters from Forza Italia and continue to sit in their original group. Af sixth coincillor, Massimiliano Barison, was a member of Brothers of Italy and the group from January 2018 to June 2019.)	Sergio Berlato / Andrea Bassi	1	3
Forza Italia / More Italy!–I Love Veneto (Note: The remaining two members of the group, Massimo Giorgetti and Elena Donazzan, were no longer affiliated to Forza Italia by mid 2018, both citing disagreements with the party's regional leadership. In December 2018 Donazzan launched I Love Veneto. In February 2019 Giorgetti joined Brothers of Italy, but chose not to join that party's group and to maintain his affiliation with Donazzan. In March 2019 the name of the group was finally changed. In June 2019 also Donazzan joined Brothers of Italy.)	Massimiliano Barison / Massimo Giorgetti	3	2
Civic Veneto / United Venetians	Pietro Dalla Libera (Note: Founding member Piero Dalla Libera was elected as part of the centre-left coalition and then switched its allegiance to the majority led by President Luca Zaia. In June 2019 he was joined by Massimiliano Barison, a former member of Forza Italia and Brothers of Italy.)	1	2
Tosi List for Veneto / Veneto for Autonomy–Forza Italia	Stefano Casali / Maurizio Conte (Note: Maurizio Conte joined Forza Italia in August 2017, but was not able to add the party's name to that of the group until March 2019.)	3	1
Moretti President / Civic List for Veneto	Franco Ferrari	2	1
NCD–UdC–Popular Area / Popular Area–Forza Italia	Marino Zorzato (Note: Marino Zorzato joined Forza Italia in November 2018, but was not able to add the party's name to that of the group until March 2019.)	1	1
Independence We Veneto / We Are Veneto / Party of Venetians	Antonio Guadagnini	1	1
Veneto of Acting / Veneto Autonomous Heart	Giovanna Negro	1	1
Venetian Centre-Right (Note: The group was formed in May 2017 by Fabiano Barbisan of Liga Veneta, who joined the group for technical purposes, and two splinters of the Tosi List for Veneto, Andrea Bassi and Stefano Casali. In February 2020 the latter two joined Brothers of Italy and the group was thus dissolved.)	Stefano Casali / Andrea Bassi	0	0
Mixed Group (Note: Final members: Piero Ruzzante, splinter of the Democratic Party and member of Article One; Stefano Valdegamberi, a former member of the Union of Christian and Centre Democrats and elect of the Zaia for President list in 2015 (he officially joined Liga Veneta in June 2020); Patrizia Bartelle, splinter of the Five Star Movement and member of Italia in Comune; Fabiano Barbisan, a member of Liga Veneta who had been a member of Venetian Centre-Right from May 2017 to February 2020; Cristina Guarda, a member of the Federation of Greens; and Orietta Salemi, a member of Italia Viva. Ruzzante's latest affiliation was with "The Veneto We Want" (a grouping formed by Arturo Lorenzoni; Valdegamberi's Tzimbar Earde, "Cimbrian Land", due to his Cimbrian roots; Bertelle's "Veneto Ecology Solidarity".)	Piero Ruzzante	0	6

Sources: Regional Council of Veneto – Groups and Regional Council of Veneto – Members

=== Members by party of election ===
==== Zaia for President ====
- Fabiano Barbisan (switched to "Venetian Centre-Right" in May 2017, switched to the Mixed Group in February 2020)
- Fabrizio Boron
- Gianpaolo Bottacin
- Sonia Brescacin
- Francesco Calzavara
- Nicola Finco (switched to "Liga Veneta–Lega Nord" in June 2015)
- Nazzareno Gerolimetto
- Manuela Lanzarin
- Gabriele Michieletto
- Silvia Rizzotto
- Luciano Sandonà
- Stefano Valdegamberi (switched to the "Mixed Group" in March 2017)
- Alberto Villanova

==== Liga Veneta–Lega Nord ====
- Riccardo Barbisan
- Roberto Ciambetti
- Luca Coletto (resigned on 7 January 2019)
- Maurizio Colman (installed on 19 June 2018)
- Enrico Corsi (installed on 15 January 2019)
- Marino Finozzi (resigned on 15 June 2018)
- Gianluca Forcolin
- Franco Gidoni
- Roberto Marcato
- Alessandro Montagnoli
- Gianpiero Possamai
- Alberto Semenzato
- Luca Zaia (elected as president)

==== Venetian Democratic Party ====
- Graziano Azzalin
- Anna Maria Bigon (installed on 5 July 2019)
- Stefano Fracasso
- Alessandra Moretti (elected as runner-up for president; resigned on 2 July 2019)
- Bruno Pigozzo
- Piero Ruzzante (switched to the "Mixed Group", as a member of Article One, in February 2017)
- Orietta Salemi (switched to the "Mixed Group", as a member of Italia Viva, in July 2020)
- Claudio Sinigaglia
- Andrea Zanoni
- Francesca Zottis

==== Five Star Movement ====
- Erika Baldin
- Patrizia Bartelle (switched to the "Mixed Group" in November 2018)
- Jacopo Berti
- Manuel Brusco
- Simone Scarabel

==== Forza Italia ====
(In March 2019 the group, no longer affiliated to Forza Italia, was re-named "More Italy!–I Love Veneto".)

- Massimiliano Barison (switched to "Brothers of Italy" in January 2018, switched to "United Venetians" in June 2019)
- Elena Donazzan (left the party by mid 2018)
- Massimo Giorgetti (left the party by mid 2018)

==== Tosi List for Veneto ====
(In July 2017 the group, no longer connected to the Tosi List for Veneto, was re-named "Veneto for Autonomy".)

- Andrea Bassi (switched to "Venetian Centre-Right" in May 2017, switched o "Brothers of Italy" in February 2020)
- Stefano Casali (switched to "Venetian Centre-Right" in May 2017, switched o "Brothers of Italy" in February 2020)
- Maurizio Conte (member of Forza Italia since August 2017)

==== Moretti for President ====
(In July 2019 the group was re-named "Civic List for Veneto".)

- Franco Ferrari
- Cristina Guarda (switched to the "Mixed Group", as a member of the Federation of the Greens, in July 2020)

==== NCD–UdC–Popular Area ====
- Marino Zorzato (member of Forza Italia since November 2018)

==== Independence We Veneto ====
(Since March 2016 the group was named "We Are Veneto" and since February 2020 "Party of Venetians".)

- Antonio Guadagnini

==== Brothers of Italy ====
- Sergio Berlato (resigned on 31 January 2020)
- Joe Formaggio (installed on 21 February 2020)

==== Civic Veneto ====
(Since July 2018 the group was named "United Venetians".)

- Pietro Dalla Libera

==== Veneto of Acting / Veneto Autonomous Heart ====
(Since December 2018 the group was named "Veneto Autonomous Heart".)

- Giovanna Negro

== Election ==
Luca Zaia of Liga Veneta–Lega Nord was re-elected President by a landslide 50.1% of the vote. Liga Veneta, which ran an official party list and a list named after Zaia, was confirmed the largest in the region with 40.9%. The Democratic Party came second with 20.5% (combined result of official party list and Alessandra Moretti's personal list) and the Five Star Movement third with 10.4%. The total score of Venetist parties was 54.3%, then a record.

31 May 2015 Venetian regional election results
Candidates	Votes	%	Seats	Parties	Votes	%	Seat
Luca Zaia	1,108,065	50.09	1				
Luca Zaia	1,108,065	50.09	1	Zaia for President	427,363	23.09	13
Luca Zaia	1,108,065	50.09	1	Northern League – Venetian League	329,966	17.83	10
Luca Zaia	1,108,065	50.09	1	Forza Italia	110,573	5.97	3
Luca Zaia	1,108,065	50.09	1	Independence We Veneto	49,929	2.70	1
Luca Zaia	1,108,065	50.09	1	Brothers of Italy	48,163	2.60	1
Luca Zaia	1,108,065	50.09	1	Total	965,994	52.19	28
Alessandra Moretti	503,147	22.74	1				
Alessandra Moretti	503,147	22.74	1	Democratic Party	308,438	16.66	8
Alessandra Moretti	503,147	22.74	1	Moretti for President	70,764	3.82	2
Alessandra Moretti	503,147	22.74	1	Civic Veneto	26,903	1.45	1
Alessandra Moretti	503,147	22.74	1	New Veneto (SEL – European Greens – SV)	20,282	1.10	–
Alessandra Moretti	503,147	22.74	1	Autonomous Veneto Project	6,242	0.34	–
Alessandra Moretti	503,147	22.74	1	Total	432,629	23.37	11
Jacopo Berti	262,749	11.88	–	Five Star Movement	192,630	10.41	5
Flavio Tosi	262,569	11.87	–				
Flavio Tosi	262,569	11.87	–	Tosi List for Veneto	105,836	5.72	3
Flavio Tosi	262,569	11.87	–	Popular Area (NCD – UDC)	37,937	2.05	1
Flavio Tosi	262,569	11.87	–	Veneto of Acting	26,119	1.41	1
Flavio Tosi	262,569	11.87	–	Pensioners' Family	14,625	0.79	–
Flavio Tosi	262,569	11.87	–	North-East Union	11,173	0.60	–
Flavio Tosi	262,569	11.87	–	Breed Piave – Veneto Confederal State	3,487	0.19	–
Flavio Tosi	262,569	11.87	–	Total	199,177	10.76	5
Alessio Morosin	55,760	2.52	–	Venetian Independence	46,578	2.52	–
Laura Coletti	19,914	0.90	–	The Other Veneto	13,997	0.76	–
Total candidates	2,212,204	100.00	2	Total parties	1,851,005	100.00	49
Source: Ministry of the Interior
