= Members of the Regional Council of Veneto, 2010–2015 =

The IX Legislature of the Regional Council of Veneto, the legislative assembly of Veneto, was inaugurated in April 2010, following the 2010 regional election, and ended in April 2015. Of the 60 members, 53 were elected in provincial constituencies with proportional representation with a further 6 returned from the so-called "regional list" of the elected President of Veneto, including the President himself, and the runner-up.

Clodovaldo Ruffato (The People of Freedom, later New Centre-Right) was the President of the Council for the entire term, while Luca Zaia (Liga Veneta–Lega Nord) served as President of Veneto at the head of his first government.

== Composition ==
Seven parties plus a one-member group formed by Giuseppe Bortolussi (the defeated centre-left candidate) were represented in the Council at the start of the term. The largest party in the Council was Liga Veneta with twenty seats, a third of the total. At the end of the term, the groups were sixteen, four of which formed for technical purposes as every group could validate the slates of two lists for the regional election; these included "Civic Veneto", "Zaia President", "Tosi List for Veneto" and "Family–Pensioners".

=== Strength of political groups ===
Distribution of Seats in the Regional Council
Political Group	Leader	2010	2015
Venetian Democratic Party	Laura Puppato / Lucio Tiozzo	14	10
Liga Veneta–Lega Nord	Federico Caner	20	7
NCD–UdC	Giancarlo Conta	–	7
The People of Freedom–Forza Italia	Dario Bond	17	5
Forza Italia	Leonardo Padrin	–	5
Tosi List for Veneto (Venetian Commitment)	Francesco Piccolo	–	3
Popular Future	Stefano Valdegamberi	–	3
Veneto First	Giovanni Furlanetto	–	3
Family–Pensioners (Toward North–Venetian People)	Diego Bottacin	–	3
Civic Veneto	Giuseppe Berlato Sella	–	3
Zaia President	Gianpiero Possamai	–	3
Italy of Values	Gustavo Franchetto / Antonino Pipitone	3	2
Union of the Centre	Stefano Valdegamberi / Stefano Peraro	3	1
Federation of the Left	Pietrangelo Pettenò	1	1
North-East Union	Mariangelo Foggiato / Rolando Bortoluzzi	1	1
Bortolussi President	Giuseppe Bortolussi	1	1
Mixed Group	–	–	2

Sources: Regional Council of Veneto – Groups and Regional Council of Veneto – Members

=== Members by party of election ===
==== Liga Veneta–Lega Nord ====
- Luca Baggio (switched to "Venetian Commitment", later "Tosi List for Veneto", in March 2015)
- Andrea Bassi (switched to the "Mixed Group" in March 2015)
- Santino Bozza (expelled; switched to the "Mixed Group"in July 2013, later affiliated to Veneto First; switched to "Veneto First" in February 2015)
- Federico Caner
- Bruno Cappon (elected from regional list)
- Vittorino Cenci (switched to "Veneto First" in February 2015)
- Roberto Ciambetti
- Maurizio Conte (switched to the "Mixed Group" in March 2015)
- Cristiano Corazzari (resigned on 1 June 2014)
- Enrico Corsi (installed on 8 July 2014; resigned on 1 August 2014)
- Stefano Falconi (installed on 10 June 2014; switched to "Zaia President" in March 2015)
- Nicola Finco (switched to "Zaia President" in March 2015)
- Marino Finozzi
- Giovanni Furlanetto (switched to the "Mixed Group" in January 2014, later affiliated to Veneto First; switched to "Veneto First" in February 2015)
- Arianna Lazzarini
- Franco Manzato
- Giampiero Possamai (switched to "Zaia President" in March 2015)
- Sandro Sandri (switched to the "Mixed Group" in October 2012; switched to "New Centre-Right" in September 2014)
- Daniele Stival (switched to "Toward North–Venetian People" in March 2015)
- Giuseppe Stoppato (installed on 16 September 2014; switched to "Toward North–Venetian People" in March 2015)
- Paolo Tosato (resigned on 2 July 2014)
- Matteo Toscani (switched to "Venetian Commitment", later "Tosi List for Veneto", in March 2015)
- Luca Zaia (elected as president)

==== The People of Freedom ====
(From November 2013 to February 2014 the group was named as "The People of Freedom – New Centre Right". Since February 2014 the group was named "The People of Freedom – Forza Italia for Veneto".)

- Davide Bendinelli (switched to "Forza Italia" in November 2013)
- Dario Bond
- Renato Chisso (suspended on 31 May 2014)
- Giancarlo Conta (switched to "New Centre-Right" in February 2014)
- Maria Luisa Coppola (forcedly resigned on 28 November 2014)
- Piergiorgio Cortelazzo (elected from regional list)
- Elena Donazzan
- Amedeo Gerolimetto (installed on 8 July 2014)
- Massimo Giorgetti
- Nereo Laroni (elected from regional list; switched to "New Centre-Right" in February 2014)
- Mauro Mainardi (elected from regional list; switched to "Forza Italia" in November 2013)
- Renzo Marangon (installed on 15 December 2014, joined "Forza Italia")
- Leonardo Padrin (switched to "Forza Italia" in November 2013)
- Francesco Piccolo (installed on 9 July 2014 as substitute of Renato Chisso, joined the "Mixed Group"; switched to "Venetian Commitment", later "Tosi List for Veneto", in March 2015)
- Clodovaldo Ruffato (switched to "New Centre-Right" in February 2014)
- Remo Sernagiotto (switched to "Forza Italia" in November 2013; resigned on 7 July 2014)
- Moreno Teso (switched to "Forza Italia" in March 2014)
- Carlo Alberto Tesserin (switched to "New Centre-Right" in February 2014)
- Costantino Toniolo (switched to "New Centre-Right" in February 2014)
- Marino Zorzato (elected from regional list; switched to "New Centre-Right" in February 2014)

==== Venetian Democratic Party ====
- Alessio Alessandrini (installed on 9 July 2014, substitute of Giampietro Marchese until 24 July 2014; switched to "Civic Veneto" in March 2015)
- Graziano Azzalin
- Giuseppe Berlato Sella (switched to "Civic Veneto" in March 2015)
- Franco Bonfante
- Mauro Bortoli (switched to "Civic Veneto" in March 2015)
- Diego Bottacin (switched to the "Mixed Group" in October 2010; switched to "Toward North–Venetian People" in March 2015)
- Andrea Causin (switched to the "Mixed Group" in March 2011; resigned on 25 March 2013)
- Roberto Fasoli
- Stefano Fracasso
- Giampietro Marchese (installed on 10 April 2013; suspended on 31 May 2014; switched to the "Mixed Group" in June 2014; resigned on 24 July 2014)
- Claudio Niero (installed on 14 March 2013)
- Bruno Pigozzo
- Laura Puppato (resigned on 12 March 2013)
- Sergio Reolon
- Piero Ruzzante
- Claudio Sinigaglia
- Lucio Tiozzo

==== Union of the Centre ====
- Raffaele Grazia (switched to "Popular Future" in May 2013)
- Stefano Peraro
- Stefano Valdegamberi (switched to "Popular Future" in May 2013)

==== Italy of Values ====
- Gustavo Franchetto (switched to the "Mixed Group" in January 2013; switched to "Popular Future" in May 2013)
- Gennaro Marotta
- Antonino Pipitone

==== Federation of the Left ====
- Pietrangelo Pettenò

==== North-East Union ====
- Mariangelo Foggiato (resigned on 27 August 2014)
- Rolando Bortoluzzi (installed 16 September 2014)

==== Bortolussi President ====
- Giuseppe Bortolussi (elected as runner-up for president)

== Election ==
The election that produced the IX Legislature took place on 28–29 March 2010. Luca Zaia, leader of Liga Veneta–Lega Nord, was elected President by a landslide and his party became the largest in the region with 35.2%. The total score of Venetist parties was 37.2%, more than ever before.

Liga Veneta managed the highest swing ever in a regional election in Veneto (+20.5%), gaining from almost every part of the political spectrum, but mainly from The People of Freedom (–7.5%), the Democrats (–8.6%) and other Venetists (–5.1%).

28–29 March 2010 Venetian regional election results
Candidates	Votes	%	Seats	Parties	Votes	%	Seat
Luca Zaia	1,528,386	60.16	6				
Luca Zaia	1,528,386	60.16	6	Northern League – Venetian League	788,581	35.16	18
Luca Zaia	1,528,386	60.16	6	The People of Freedom	555,006	24.74	13
Luca Zaia	1,528,386	60.16	6	Alliance of the Centre – Christian Democracy	18,114	0.81	–
Luca Zaia	1,528,386	60.16	6	Total	1,361,702	60.71	31
Giuseppe Bortolussi	738,761	29.08	1				
Giuseppe Bortolussi	738,761	29.08	1	Democratic Party	456,309	20.34	14
Giuseppe Bortolussi	738,761	29.08	1	Italy of Values	119,396	5.32	3
Giuseppe Bortolussi	738,761	29.08	1	Federation of the Left	35,028	1.56	1
Giuseppe Bortolussi	738,761	29.08	1	Left Ecology Freedom – Italian Socialist Party	27,578	1.23	–
Giuseppe Bortolussi	738,761	29.08	1	IDEA – List for Veneto	15,907	0.67	–
Giuseppe Bortolussi	738,761	29.08	1	Liga Veneto Autonomo	4,390	0.20	–
Giuseppe Bortolussi	738,761	29.08	1	Total	657,798	29.33	18
Antonio De Poli	162,235	6.39	–				
Antonio De Poli	162,235	6.39	–	Union of the Centre	110,417	4.92	3
Antonio De Poli	162,235	6.39	–	North-East Union	34,697	1.55	1
Antonio De Poli	162,235	6.39	–	Total	145,114	6.47	4
David Borrelli	80,246	3.16	–	Five Star Movement	57,848	2.58	–
Silvano Polo	12,891	0.51	–	Venetians Independence	7,879	0.35	–
Paolo Caratossidis	9,151	0.35	–	New Force	6,476	0.29	–
Gianluca Panto	9,006	0.36	–	Venetian National Party	6,226	0.28	–
Total candidates	2,540,736	100.00	7	Total parties	2,243,042	100.00	53
Source: Ministry of the Interior
