= Tosi List for Veneto =

Tosi List for Veneto Lista Tosi per il Veneto
- Leader: Flavio Tosi
- Founded: March 2015
- Dissolved: 15 June 2022
- Split from: Liga Veneta
- Merged into: Forza Italia
- Ideology: Regionalism; Liberal conservatism
- Political position: Centre-right
- National affiliation: Act!

The Tosi List for Veneto (Italian: Lista Tosi per il Veneto, LTV) was a centrist and regionalist political party in Veneto, Italy, named after its leader Flavio Tosi. The party emerged in March 2015 as a split from Liga Veneta–Lega Nord. Its members were instrumental in the establishment of Act! at the Italian level in July 2015.

== History ==
=== Background ===
In the run-up of the 2007 municipal elections Tosi, long-time member of Liga Veneta–Lega Nord (LV–LN) and regional minister of Health since 2005, formed a "civic list" named after himself, the Tosi List (LT), in order to support his bid to become mayor of Verona. In the election Tosi, who was supported also by Forza Italia, National Alliance and a number of minor parties, was elected mayor by a landslide 60.7% of the vote and the LT won 16.4%, more than LV's 12.0%.

Five years later Tosi decided to run with the only support of the LT and the LV: he was re-elected with 57.3% of the vote, while the LT won 37.2% and the LV 10.7%. Such an electoral success propelled Tosi to the leadership of the LV, whose national congress elected him national secretary in June 2012.

In October 2013 Tosi launched Let's Rebuild the Country (Ricostruiamo il Paese), a think tank aimed at preparing his bid in a putative centre-right prime-ministerial primary election.

=== Split from Liga Veneta ===
In the run-up of the 2015 regional election the LV was quite divided on alliances and strategies. Luca Zaia, the incumbent President and rival of Tosi within the party, wanted to continue the alliance with its centre-right partners, Forza Italia (FI) and the New Centre-Right (NCD), and create a "Zaia List", Tosi wanted the party to run with the sole support of the "Zaia List" and a "Tosi List", while Matteo Salvini, the LN's federal secretary, kept an open mind only on FI and opposed, along with Zaia, any notion of a "Tosi List". Furthermore, while Zaia, supported by Salvini, wanted to renovate the party's group in the Regional Council and have a final say on the compilation of the party's slates, Tosi, who defended the position of long-time regional councillors and ministers, claimed his authority and the autonomy of the LV in relation to the federal party.

In early March two regional councillors close to Tosi, Luca Baggio and Matteo Toscani, launched the pro-Tosi Venetian Commitment (Impegno Veneto), along with Francesco Piccolo, a former member of The People of Freedom, who was elected leader of the group in the Regional Council. Both Baggio, who had served as president of the LV since 2012, and Toscani explained that they disagreed with a perceived rightward shift of the party under Salvini.

After a long struggle between Tosi and Salvini, the latter acknowledged the former's relinquishment from party member, on the grounds that Tosi had refused to ditch his think tank, Let's Rebuild the Country. Consequently, Tosi decided to challenge Zaia and run for president.

Besides Baggio and Toscani, between March and April four more regional councillors of Liga Veneta (Daniele Stival, regional minister of Venetian Identity, and Giuseppe Stoppato, who formed, along with former Democrat Diego Bottacin, a group named "Toward North–Venetian People", Maurizio Conte, regional minister of the Environment, and Andrea Bassi), left the party in order to follow Tosi, along with three deputies (Matteo Bragantini, Roberto Caon and Emanuele Prataviera) out of five and three senators (Raffaella Bellot, Patrizia Bisinella, Tosi's partner, and Emanuela Munerato) out of five, while the three highest-ranking Tosiani, Marino Finozzi (regional minister of Tourism and International Trade), Leonardo Muraro (President of the Province of Treviso) and Mara Bizzotto MEP, chose not to.

In the meantime, Venetian Agreement changed its name into Tosi List for Veneto (LTV) and Toward North–Venetian People to "Family–Pensioners".

In late April four regional councillors of FI (Leonardo Padrin, Mauro Mainardi, Renzo Marangon and Moreno Teso) joined the LTV. Finally, Muraro reverted his earlier decision not to follow Tosi and left Liga Veneta in order to head the LTV's list in the province of Treviso.

=== 2015 regional election ===
In the election, Tosi ran with the support of six lists, more than any other candidate: two lists connected to the LTV (Tosi List for Veneto and Il Veneto del Fare con Tosi), the traditional Christian-democratic NCD–UdC–Popular Area, the Pensioners' Party, North-East Union and Veneto Confederal State. Three incumbent regional ministers ran with Tosi: Conte and Stival with the LTV, and Marino Zorzato with NCD–UdC–Popular Area. The top-candidates of the LTV provincial lists were Bassi in Verona, Fabrizio Bisognin in Vicenza, Conte in Padua, Muraro in Treviso, Toscani in Belluno, Stival in Venice and Gianni Tessari in Rovigo. Bottacin was a candidate of the LTV in Treviso, Piccolo of the same list in Venice, Marangon of Il Veneto del Fare in Vicenza, and Giovanna Negro, a former deputy of Lega Nord, of the latter list in Verona.

On election day, Tosi won 11.9% of the vote (a distant fourth to Zaia's 50.1%) and the two lists connected with the LTV obtained 7.1% of the vote (combined result of the LTV, 5.7%, and Il Veneto del Fare, 1.4%) and 4 regional councillors: Stefano Casali, Bassi and Negro in Verona, and Conte in Padua.

In July 2015 Tosi re-organised his followers into a full-fledged party, named Act!. The LTV, whose members virtually automatically joined the new party, continued to exist as a group within the Regional Council under the leadership of Casali and its councillors started to back Zaia on several issues, notably including regional autonomy.

=== The splits into the Regional Council ===
In November 2016 Casali launched his bid for mayor of Verona in 2017 without Tosi's support, in the following months formed a separate group from that of the Tosi List in the Municipal Council, while continuing to lead the LTV in the Regional Council, and finally chose to support the joint centre-right candidate for mayor, Federico Sboarina, instead of Patrizia Bisinella, Tosi's partner and LTV's official candidate for mayor. In May 2017 Casali and Bassi finally left the LTV and formed a separate group in the Regional Council, Venetian Centre-Right – Autonomy and Freedom (Centrodestra Veneto – Autonomia e Libertà). In doing this, they were joined by a third councillor, Fabiano Barbisan of Liga Veneta (but elected with the Zaia List), for technical reasons.

In July 2017 Conte launched Veneto for Autonomy (Veneto per l'Autonomia), explaining that "Tosi has always been a friend, but at this time clarity is needed with regard to political goals. I believe that there has been too much uncertainty and little clarity over the positions to take on state reform" (Tosi and Act! had campaigned for the "yes" in the 2016 constitutional referendum over a centralising constitutional reformed proposed by the centre-left).

=== The merger into Forza Italia ===
Flavio Tosi once again ran for mayor in the municipal elections of Verona in 2022, supported by the Tosi List, by Act! and by Forza Italia. The final result was 23,86%, finishing third after Damiano Tommasi (candidate of the centre-left, who won the ballot) and Federico Sboarina (candidate for Brothers of Italy and the League, defeated in the ballot also due to the refused semblance with the lists in support of Tosi). On 15 June 2022, following the results of the first round of the Municipal election, Tosi finally announced the confluence of the Tosi List and Act! in Forza Italia.
