= Municipal elections in Veneto =

This page gathers the results of municipal elections in Veneto, Italy in the region's five major cities (more than 80,000 inhabitants), since 1993.

== 1993–2000 ==
=== 1993 municipal elections ===
	Christian Democracy			Alliance of Progressives			Lega Nord			Others
	candidate	1st round	2nd round	candidate	1st round	2nd round	candidate	1st round	2nd round	1st round
Venice	Giovanni Castellani (Christian Democracy)	23.4%	–	Massimo Cacciari (Democratic Party of the Left)	42.3%	55.4%	Aldo Mariconda (Liga Veneta–Lega Nord)	26.5%	44.6%	7.8%

Sourcea: Regional Council of Veneto and Corriere della Sera

=== 1994 municipal elections ===
	Pole of Freedoms			Alliance of Progressives & PPI			Lega Nord			Others
	candidate	1st round	2nd round	candidate	1st round	2nd round	candidate	1st round	2nd round	1st round
Verona	Michela Sironi (Forza Italia); Massimo Galli Righi (National Alliance)	29.5% 9.5%	61.5%	Dario Donella (Democratic Party of the Left); Gian Antonio Vaccaro (Italian People's Party)	22.6% 14.4%	39.5%	Giovanni Maccagnani (Liga Veneta–Lega Nord)	17.3%	with Sironi	16.2%
Treviso	Stefano Cerniato (Forza Italia); Alberto Di Pasquale (National Alliance)	15.9% 10.8%	–	Aldo Tognana (Italian People's Party)	29.9%	45.2%	Giancarlo Gentilini (Liga Veneta–Lega Nord)	23.0%	54.8%	20.3%

Source: Regional Council of Veneto

=== 1995 municipal elections ===
	Pole of Freedoms			Alliance of Progressives & PPI			Lega Nord & allies			Others
	candidate	1st round	2nd round	candidate	1st round	2nd round	candidate	1st round	2nd round	1st round
Padua	Francesco Gentile (Forza Italia)	38.6%	42.3%	Flavio Zanonato (Democratic Party of the Left)	32.0%	57.7%	Luigi Mariani (Italian People's Party)	22.3%	–	7.1%
Vicenza	Marino Breganze (Forza Italia)	40.6%	49.1	Marino Quaresimin (Italian People's Party)	34.4%	50.9	Giuseppe Magnabosco (Liga Veneta–Lega Nord)	12.2%	–	12.6%

Source: Regional Council of Veneto

=== 1997 municipal elections ===
	Pole for Freedoms			The Olive Tree			Lega Nord			Others
	candidate	1st round	2nd round	candidate	1st round	2nd round	candidate	1st round	2nd round	1st round
Venice	Mauro Pizzigati (Forza Italia)	20.7%	–	Massimo Cacciari (Democratic Party of the Left)	64.6%	–	Giovanni Fabris (Liga Veneta–Lega Nord)	10.2%	–	4.5%

Source: Regional Council of Veneto

=== 1998 municipal elections ===
	Pole for Freedoms			The Olive Tree			Lega Nord			Others
	candidate	1st round	2nd round	candidate	1st round	2nd round	candidate	1st round	2nd round	1st round
Treviso	Ferruccio Bresolin (Forza Italia)	25.9%	–	Domenico Luciani (independent)	31.3%	40.5%	Giancarlo Gentilini (Liga Veneta–Lega Nord)	42.8%	59.5%	
Verona	Michela Sironi (Forza Italia)	40.3%	58.4%	Giuseppe Brugnoli (Italian People's Party)	30.6%	41.6%	Francesco Girondini (Liga Veneta–Lega Nord)	15.9%	–	13.2%
Vicenza	Enrico Hüllweck (Forza Italia)	35.7%	56.5%	Giorgio Sala (Italian People's Party)	33.1%	43.5%	Margherita Carta (Liga Veneta–Lega Nord)	14.0%	–	17.2%

Source: Istituto Cattaneo

=== 1999 municipal elections ===
	Pole for Freedoms			The Olive Tree			Lega Nord			Others
	candidate	1st round	2nd round	candidate	1st round	2nd round	candidate	1st round	2nd round	1st round
Padua	Giustina Destro (Forza Italia)	42.2%	50.5%	Flavio Zanonato (Democrats of the Left)	41.6%	49.5%	Luciano Gasperini (Liga Veneta–Lega Nord)	4.9%	–	11.3%

Source: Istituto Cattaneo

=== 2000 municipal elections ===
	House of Freedoms (incl. Lega Nord)			The Olive Tree			PRC & Greens			Others
	candidate	1st round	2nd round	candidate	1st round	2nd round	candidate	1st round	2nd round	1st round
Venice	Renato Brunetta (Forza Italia)	39.0%	44.0%	Paolo Costa (The Democrats)	37.7%	56.0%	Gianfranco Bettin (Federation of the Greens)	16.3%	with Costa	7.0%

Source: La Repubblica

== 2001–2010 ==
=== 2002 municipal elections ===
	House of Freedoms (incl. Lega Nord)			The Olive Tree			Others
	candidate	1st round	2nd round	candidate	1st round	2nd round	1st round
Verona	Pierluigi Bolla (Forza Italia)	45.6%	45.9%	Paolo Zanotto (Democracy is Freedom)	38.7%	54.1%	15.7%

Source: La Repubblica

=== 2003 municipal elections ===
	House of Freedoms			The Olive Tree			Lega Nord			Others
	candidate	1st round	2nd round	candidate	1st round	2nd round	candidate	1st round	2nd round	1st round
Treviso	Letizia Ortica (Forza Italia)	11.2%	–	Maria Luisa Campagner (Democracy is Freedom)	37.9%	43.9%	Gian Paolo Gobbo (Liga Veneta–Lega Nord)	44.9%	56.1%	6.0%
Vicenza	Enrico Hüllwech (Forza Italia)	43.3%	53.8%	Vincenzo Riboni (Democracy is Freedom)	33.5%	46.2%	Stefano Stefani (Liga Veneta–Lega Nord)	9.6%	with Hüllwech	13.6%

Source: Istituto Cattaneo

=== 2004 municipal elections ===
	Forza Italia & National Alliance			The Olive Tree			Lega Nord			Others
	candidate	1st round	2nd round	candidate	1st round	2nd round	candidate	1st round	2nd round	1st round
Padua	Giustina Destro (Forza Italia)	33.6%	–	Flavio Zanonato (Democrats of the Left)	51.9%	–	Luciano Gasperini (Liga Veneta–Lega Nord)	4.3%	–	10.2%

Source: Istituto Cattaneo

=== 2005 municipal elections ===
	House of Freedoms			Democrats of the Left & allies			Democracy is Freedom & allies			Others
	candidate	1st round	2nd round	candidate	1st round	2nd round	candidate	1st round	2nd round	1st round
Venice	Cesare Campa (Forza Italia); Raffaele Speranzon (National Alliance)	20.3% 6.2%	–	Felice Casson (Democrats of the Left)	37.7%	49.5%	Massimo Cacciari (Democracy is Freedom)	23.2%	50.5%	12.6%

Source: Istituto Cattaneo

=== 2007 municipal elections ===
	House of Freedoms (incl. Lega Nord)			The Union			Others
	candidate	1st round	2nd round	candidate	1st round	2nd round	1st round
Verona	Flavio Tosi (Liga Veneta–Lega Nord)	60.7%	–	Paolo Zanotto (Democracy is Freedom)	33.9%	–	5.4%

Source: La Repubblica

=== 2008 municipal elections ===
	The People of Freedom & Lega Nord			Democratic Party & allies			Others
	candidate	1st round	2nd round	candidate	1st round	2nd round	1st round
Treviso	Gian Paolo Gobbo (Liga Veneta–Lega Nord)	50.4%	–	Franco Rosi (Democratic Party)	27.4%	–	22.2%
Vicenza	Amalia Sartori (Forza Italia)	39.3%	49.5%	Achille Variati (Democratic Party)	31.3%	50.5%	29.4%

Source: La Repubblica

=== 2009 municipal elections ===
	The People of Freedom & Lega Nord			Democratic Party & allies			Others
	candidate	1st round	2nd round	candidate	1st round	2nd round	1st round
Padua	Marco Marin (The People of Freedom)	44.9%	48.0%	Flavio Zanonato (Democratic Party)	45.7%	52.0%	9.4%

Source: La Repubblica

=== 2010 municipal elections ===
	The People of Freedom & Lega Nord			Democratic Party & allies			Others
	candidate	1st round	2nd round	candidate	1st round	2nd round	1st round
Venice	Renato Brunetta (The People of Freedom)	42.6%	–	Giorgio Orsoni (Democratic Party)	51.1%	–	6.3%

Source: La Repubblica

== 2011–2020 ==
=== 2012 municipal elections ===
	Lega Nord			The People of Freedom			Democratic Party & allies			Five Star Movement			Others
	candidate	1st round	2nd round	candidate	1st round	2nd round	candidate	1st round	2nd round	candidate	1st round	2nd round	1st round
Verona	Flavio Tosi (Liga Veneta–Lega Nord)	57.3%	–	Luigi Castelletti (The People of Freedom)	8.9%	–	Michele Bertucco (Democratic Party)	22.7%	–	Gianni Benciolini (Five Star Movement)	9.3%	–	1.8%

Source: La Repubblica

=== 2013 municipal elections ===
	Lega Nord & The People of Freedom			Democratic Party & allies			Five Star Movement			Local list & Civic Choice			Others
	candidate	1st round	2nd round	candidate	1st round	2nd round	candidate	1st round	2nd round	candidate	1st round	2nd round	1st round
Treviso	Giancarlo Gentilini (Liga Veneta–Lega Nord)	35.8%	44.5%	Giovanni Manildo (Democratic Party)	42.5%	55.5%	Alessandro Gnocchi (Five Star Movement)	6.9%	–	Massimo Zanetti (independent)	10.6%	–	5.1%
Vicenza	Manuela Dal Lago (Liga Veneta–Lega Nord)	27.4%	–	Achille Variati (Democratic Party)	53.5%	–	Liliana Zaltron (Five Star Movement)	6.5%	–	–	–	–	12.6%

Source: La Repubblica

=== 2014 municipal elections ===
	Lega Nord & Forza Italia			Democratic Party & allies			Local list & New Centre-Right			Padua2020 (local list)			Others
	candidate	1st round	2nd round	candidate	1st round	2nd round	candidate	1st round	2nd round	candidate	1st round	2nd round	1st round
Padua	Massimo Bitonci (Liga Veneta–Lega Nord)	31.4%	53.5%	Ivo Rossi (Democratic Party)	33.8%	46.5%	Maurizio Saia (independent)	10.6%	with Bitonci	Francesco Fiore (Padua2020, Green Italia)	9.9%	with Rossi	14.3%

Source: La Repubblica

=== 2015 municipal elections ===
	Local list & Forza Italia			Democratic Party & allies			Five Star Movement			Lega Nord			Others
	candidate	1st round	2nd round	candidate	1st round	2nd round	candidate	1st round	2nd round	candidate	1st round	2nd round	1st round
Venice	Luigi Brugnaro (independent)	28.6%	53.2%	Felice Casson (Democratic Party)	38.0%	46.8%	Davide Scano (Five Star Movement)	12.6%	–	Gian Angelo Bellati (independent)	11.9%	with Brugnaro	8.9%

Source: La Repubblica

=== 2017 municipal elections ===
	Lega Nord & Forza Italia			Democratic Party & allies			Five Star Movement			Other party			Others
	candidate	1st round	2nd round	candidate	1st round	2nd round	candidate	1st round	2nd round	candidate	1st round	2nd round	1st round
Padua	Massimo Bitonci (Liga Veneta–Lega Nord)	40.9%	48.2%	Sergio Giordani (independent)	29.2%	51.8%	Simone Borile (Five Star Movement)	5.3%	–	Arturo Lorenzoni (Civic Coalition)	22.8%	with Giordani	1.8%
Verona	Federico Sboarina (Forza Italia)	29.1%	58.1%	Orietta Salemi (Democratic Party)	22.4%	–	Alessandro Gennari (Five Star Movement)	9.5%	–	Patrizia Bisinella (Tosi List for Veneto, Act!)	23.5%	41.9%	15.5%

Source: La Repubblica

=== 2018 municipal elections ===
	Lega Nord & Forza Italia			Democratic Party & allies			Five Star Movement			Others
	candidate	1st round	2nd round	candidate	1st round	2nd round	candidate	1st round	2nd round	1st round
Treviso	Mario Conte (Liga Veneta–Lega Nord)	54.5%	–	Giovanni Manildo (Democratic Party)	37.6%	–	Domenico Losappio (Five Star Movement)	4.2%	–	3.6%
Vicenza	Francesco Rucco (independent)	50.6%	–	Otello Dalla Rosa (Democratic Party)	45.9%	–	–	–	–	3.5%

Source: La Repubblica

=== 2020 municipal elections ===
	Local list–Lega–FI–FdI			Democratic Party & allies			Five Star Movement			Others
	candidate	1st round	2nd round	candidate	1st round	2nd round	candidate	1st round	2nd round	1st round
Venice	Luigi Brugnaro (independent)	54.1%	–	Pier Paolo Baretta (Democratic Party)	29.3%	–	Sara Visman (Five Star Movement)	3.9%	–	12.7%

Source: La Repubblica

== 2021–present ==
=== 2022 municipal elections ===
	Democratic Party & allies			Lega & Brothers of Italy			Other party			Others
	candidate	1st round	2nd round	candidate	1st round	2nd round	candidate	1st round	2nd round	1st round
Padua	Sergio Giordani (independent)	58.4%	–	Francesco Peghin (independent)	33.5%	–	–	–	–	7.0%
Verona	Damiano Tommasi (independent)	39.8%	53.4%	Federico Sboarina (Brothers of Italy)	32.7%	46.6%	Flavio Tosi (Act!, Forza Italia)	23.5%	41.9%	3.6%

Source: La Repubblica

=== 2023 municipal elections ===
	Lega–FdI–FI			Democratic Party & allies			Others
	candidate	1st round	2nd round	candidate	1st round	2nd round	1st round
Treviso	Mario Conte (Liga Veneta–Lega)	64.8%	–	Giorgio De Nardi (Democratic Party)	28.3%	–	6.9%
Vicenza	Francesco Rucco (independent)	44.1%	49.5%	Giacomo Possamai (Democratic Party)	46.2%	50.5%	9.7%

Source: La Repubblica

=== 2026 municipal elections ===
	Local list–FdI–Lega–FI			Democratic Party & allies			Others
	candidate	1st round	2nd round	candidate	1st round	2nd round	1st round
Venice	Simone Venturini (independent)	51.0%	–	Andrea Martella (Democratic Party)	39.2%	–	9.8%

Source: Comune di Venezia

== See also ==
- Municipal elections in Padua
- Municipal elections in Venice
- Municipal elections in Verona
