= Act! (Italy) =

Italian political party

Act! Fare!
- Secretary: Flavio Tosi
- Coordinator: Fabio Venturi
- Founded: 21 July 2015
- Dissolved: 15 June 2022
- Split from: Liga Veneta
- Merged into: Forza Italia
- Headquarters: Via delle Nazioni, 19; 37135 Verona
- Think tank: Ricostruiamo il Paese
- Ideology: Liberalism; Liberal conservatism Federalism
- Political position: Centre-right
- National affiliation: Us with Italy (2017–18)
- Colours: Yellow, black

Website
- www.farecontosi.it

Act! (Italian: Fare!) was a centre-right liberal political party in Italy, based in Veneto.

Its leader was Flavio Tosi, former mayor of Verona and former leader of Liga Veneta–Lega Nord (LV–LN), who was expelled from it in the run-up of the 2015 Venetian regional election, due to his opposition to Matteo Salvini's political line.

== History ==
=== Background ===
In the run-up of the 2015 regional election, after a long struggle with Lega Nord federal secretary Matteo Salvini, Flavio Tosi was ejected from the party and, consequently, removed from his office of national secretary of Liga Veneta, the largest party in Veneto and one of the largest "national" sections of Lega Nord. Consequently, Tosi decided to run for President of Veneto, in competition with incumbent President Luca Zaia (official candidate of the party).

Tosi was joined by three deputies (Matteo Bragantini, Roberto Caon, Emanuele Prataviera), three senators (Patrizia Bisinella, Raffaela Bellot, Emanuela Munerato), and nine regional councillors of Veneto (Luca Baggio, Matteo Toscani, Francesco Piccolo, Daniele Stival, Giuseppe Stoppato, Diego Bottacin, Maurizio Conte, Andrea Bassi, Leonardo Padrin, Mauro Mainardi, Renzo Marangon and Moreno Teso). The latter came not just from Liga Veneta, but also other parties.

In the regional election, whose results were a large victory of Zaia and a historical high for Liga Veneta, Tosi won 11.9% of the vote as candidate for President and two lists close to him, the Tosi List for Veneto and Il Veneto del Fare con Tosi, obtained a combined 7.1% and four regional councillors (Bassi, Conte, Stefano Casali and Giovanna Negro).

=== Foundation and early years ===
In July 2015, Tosi re-organised his followers into a full-fledged party, named Act! (Fare!). Immediately, Michele Boldrin, former leader of Act to Stop the Decline, sued Act! as the names of the two parties looked too similar, but nothing consequential happened.

In September a fourth deputy joined the party: Marco Marcolin, also from Liga Veneta–Lega Nord. Marcolin would switch to Civic Choice (SC) in October 2016.

In October Act! became an occasional supporter of the government led by Matteo Renzi, whom Tosi held in high esteem, fueling rumors that the party might either enter in stable alliance with or join Renzi's Democratic Party (PD). However, during the party's national convention in February 2016, Tosi rejected any notion of a stable alliance with Renzi, while expressing his interest for an agreement with centre-right forces. In fact, Act! maintained its independence from the government, while occasionally supporting it and favouring the "yes" vote in the 2016 constitutional referendum, differently from the entire centre-right. The vote resulted in a huge defeat for Renzi, who resigned from Prime Minister and was replaced by Democrat Paolo Gentiloni, at the head of a similar centre-left government.

Following April 2016, Act! formed a sub-group within the Mixed Group of the Chamber of Deputies in alliance with the Italian Republican Party (PRI), a minor liberal party which had no deputies, but had run in the 2013 general election and, as such, could form a sub-group under its name.

=== Internal rifts and centrist alliances ===
In November 2016, Casali launched his bid for mayor of Verona in 2017 without Tosi's support, in the following months formed a separate group from that of the Tosi List for Verona in the Municipal Council, while continuing to lead the Tosi List for Veneto in the Regional Council, and finally chose to support the joint centre-right candidate for mayor, Federico Sboarina. Bisinella was instead chosen as the party's official candidate for mayor.

Contextually, at the national level, Tosi was planning a new liberal party with Civic Choice (SC), the support of the Fondazione Luigi Einaudi and the endorsement of Guy Verhofstadt (leader of the ALDE Group in the European Parliament), in the context of a broad centrist front, composed also by Popular Alternative (AP), the Centrists for Europe (CpE) and the Liberal Popular Alliance (ALA). In May the liberal and pro-EU "Free Italy" was launched during a convention.

In May 2017, Casali and Bassi finally left Act! and formed a separate group from LTV's in the Regional Council, the Venetian Centre-Right. In doing this, they were joined by a third councillor, Fabiano Barbisan of Liga Veneta (but elected with the Zaia List), for technical reasons.

In June 2017, Bisinella came second with 23.5% in the municipal election of Verona, but, despite the external support of the PD, she was defeated by Sboarina 41.9% to 58.1% in the run-off. The Tosi List won 16.5% (with Tosi obtaining 3,000 preference votes) and Act! 2.7%. Outside Verona, Tosiani obtained negligible results.

=== Back to the centre-right ===
After the defeat in Verona, Tosi started a rapprochement with the centre-right coalition, especially with Silvio Berlusconi and his Forza Italia (FI) party. Despite this, the party suffered another centre-right split in Veneto, where Conte launched Veneto for Autonomy, effectively disbanding the LTV. Along with Conte, the two most leading founding members of the new party were Baggio, a former regional councillor and national president of Liga Veneta, and Caon, a deputy. Subsequently, Caon left the party's sub-group and joined the group of FI, while the remaining two Act! deputies joined forces with AP splinter Enrico Costa, under the new name "Act!–PRI–Liberals".

In December 2017 Act! was a founding member of Us with Italy (NcI), a pro-Berlusconi centrist electoral list within the centre-right for the 2018 general election, along with SC, splinters of AP (two groups, one led by Costa and the other by Maurizio Lupi), Direction Italy (DI), Cantiere Popolare (CP) and the Movement for the Autonomies (MpA). NcI was later enlarged with the inclusion of the Union of the Centre (UdC) and Identity and Action (IdeA), with the goal of reaching 3.0%, required to win seats from proportional lists under a new electoral law.

=== Dissolution and merger with Forza Italia ===
Flavio Tosi once again ran for mayor in the municipal elections of Verona in 2022, supported by the Tosi List, by Act! and by Forza Italia. The final result was 23.9%, finishing third after Damiano Tommasi (candidate of the centre-left coalition, who won the ballot) and Federico Sboarina (candidate for Brothers of Italy and the League, defeated also due to the refused semblance with the lists is support of Tosi). On 15 June 2022, following the results of the first round of the Municipal election, Tosi finally announced the merger of the Tosi List and Act! into Forza Italia, bringing an end to the party's existence.

== Ideology ==
Act! adopted a moderate approach, supporting social conservatism on public security, social liberalism on social themes (even though some of its elects were quite conservative on those issues), economic liberalism and federalism. Here were some of the positions held by the party:

- on social themes, it supported same-sex unions (not LGBT adoption), legalisation of prostitution, unification of law enforcement, re-introduction of 6 months of conscription;
- on the economy, it supported tax cuts, abolition of the so-called "house tax" (IMU) and end to "field research";
- on constitutional issues, it supported federalism, unification of small municipalities, a strong premiership, a spoils system for public works and the abolition of the Italian Senate;
- on the judiciary, it supported abolition of early release of those convicted of serious crimes, anti-bureaucracy and role separation between judge and public prosecutor;
- in foreign policy, it supported the war on terror (including a war declaration to ISIL), limitation to immigration, and more independence from the European Union.
- on defense, it supported more spending for the military.

== Leadership ==
- Secretary: Flavio Tosi
- Coordinator: Fabio Venturi
