= Pietrangelo Pettenò =

Italian politician from Veneto

Pietrangelo Pettenò (Mestre, 6 January 1960) is an Italian politician from Veneto.

Pettenò, a flight engineer, started his political career in the 1980s with the Italian Communist Party (PCI). In 1991 he opposed the transformation of the party into the Democratic Party of the Left (PDS) and was a founding member of the Communist Refoundation Party (PRC) instead. Thus, he was three times elected (2000, 2005 and 2010) with the PRC to the Regional Council of Veneto. Between 2000 and 2005 Pettenò served also as municipal councillor in Venice.

In March 2015 Pettenò, who wanted a fourth term as regional councillor and to support Alessandra Moretti of the Democratic Party (PD) for President in the 2015 regional election, left the PRC and launched Venetian Left (SV). The new party participated in the election within the New Veneto (VN) list, endorsed also by the regional sections of Left Ecology and Freedom (SEL) and the Federation of the Greens (FdV). Pettenò was not elected and later merged his party into Italian Left.

As regional councillor, Pettenò made his name also for being a Venetist. Occasionally he has supported Venetian independence.
