= Franco Gidoni =

Italian politician

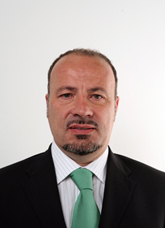
Franco Gidoni

Franco Gidoni (Feltre, 4 January 1955) is a Venetist politician from Veneto, Italy.

A member of Liga Veneta–Lega Nord, Gidoni was deputy mayor of Belluno from 2006 to 2008 and a member of the Chamber of Deputies from 2008 to 2013, when he did not stand for re-election as he was not a supporter of Flavio Tosi's new course within the party.

In the 2015 regional election, after Tosi was sidelined by the federal party, Gidoni was elected to the Regional Council of Veneto in the province of Belluno. He was not re-elected in the 2020 regional election.
