= Venetian Left =

Venetian Left refers to:

- Venetian Left (Venetian: Sanca Veneta), a separatist social-democratic party founded in 2013;
- Venetian Left (Italian: Sinistra Veneta), a communist party active from 2015 to 2017.
