= Muraro =

Muraro is an Italian surname. Notable people with the surname include:

- Carlo Muraro (born 1955), Italian footballer
- Leonardo Muraro (born 1955), Italian politician
- Roger Muraro (born 1959), French classical pianist
- Rose Marie Muraro (1930–2014), Brazilian sociologist, writer, intellectual and feminist
