= Alessandro Montagnoli =

Italian politician

Alessandro Montagnoli (Isola della Scala, 28 March 1973) is a Venetist politician from Veneto, Italy.

A member of Liga Veneta–Lega Nord since 1992, Montagnoli was elected mayor of Oppeano in 2004 and re-elected in 2009.

In the 2008 general election he was elected to the Chamber of Deputies, where he served as vice president of Lega Nord's parliamentary group. Five years later he got a low slot in the party's slate, due to his bad relations with Liga Veneta's new leader Flavio Tosi, and was not re-elected.

In the 2015 regional election Montagnoli made his political comeback and was elected to the Regional Council of Veneto from the province of Verona.
