= New Centre-Right Autonomous Veneto =

- Founded: 2013
- Headquarters: Veneto
- Ideology: Christian democracy Regionalism

New Centre-Right Autonomous Veneto (Nuovo Centrodestra Veneto Autonomo, NCD–VA) was the regional section in Veneto of the New Centre-Right, a Christian-democratic political party in Italy. The party, founded in November 2013, took the new denomination in Veneto in September 2014.

In the Regional Council of Veneto's ninth term, the NCD–VA's group was composed of seven regional councillors, notably including Marino Zorzato (Vice President of Veneto) and Clodovaldo Ruffato (President of the Regional Council). All of them were former members of Forza Italia/The People of Freedom, but Sandro Sandri, a splinter from Liga Veneta–Lega Nord. At the national level, the party's high-ranking member is Maurizio Sacconi, NCD former leader in the Senate.

Despite the bad relations between NCD and Lega Nord in Rome, the regional party was a strong supporter of Luca Zaia and a loyal coalition partner of Liga Veneta until 2015. NCD also distinguishes itself as a keen proponent of the transformation of Veneto into a special-statute autonomous region.

In the 2015 regional election NCD formed a joint list with the Union of the Centre (under the banner of Popular Area) and supported Flavio Tosi, Liga Veneta's former leader and splinter, for President. The list won a mere 2.0% of the vote, but its leader Marino Zorzato was re-elected to the Regional Council.

== Leadership ==
- Coordinator: Marino Zorzato
