= Third Galan government =

The third Galan government, led by president Giancarlo Galan, was the 16th government of Veneto and was in office from 19 May 2005 to 19 April 2010.

Third Galan government
Office	Name	Party
President	Giancarlo Galan	FI
Under-Secretary	Leonardo Padrin (since 12 June 2007)	FI
Vice President	Luca Zaia (until 6 June 2008); Franco Manzato (since 6 June 2008)	LV
Minister of Economy, Development and Innovation	Fabio Gava (until 9 July 2008); Vendemiano Sartor (since 9 July 2008)	FI
Minister of Budget, Finances, International Relations	Maria Luisa Coppola	AN
Minister of Health	Flavio Tosi (until 26 June 2007); Francesca Martini (26 June 2007 – 6 June 2008); Sandro Sandri (since 6 June 2008)	LV
Minister of Security and Public Works	Massimo Giorgetti	AN
Minister of Social Affairs	Antonio De Poli (until 28 July 2006); Stefano Valdegamberi (since 9 November 2006)	UDC
Minister of Education	Elena Donazzan	AN
Minister of Transports and Infrastructures	Renato Chisso	FI
Minister of Agriculture and Tourism	Luca Zaia (until 6 June 2008); Franco Manzato (since 6 June 2008)	LV
Minister of Environment	Giancarlo Conta	FI
Minister of Immigration	Oscar De Bona	NPSI
Minister of Territorial Affairs	Renzo Marangon	FI
Minister of Local Affairs	Stefano Valdegamberi (until 9 November 2006); Flavio Silvestrin (since 9 November 2006)	UDC

Source: Region of Veneto — The Regional Government from 1970 until today
