= Elena Donazzan =

Italian politician (born 1972)

Elena Donazzan (born 22 June 1972) is an Italian politician. Born in Bassano del Grappa, Veneto, she has been successively a member of several right-wing and centre-right parties: the Italian Social Movement (MSI), National Alliance (AN), The People of Freedom (PdL), Forza Italia (FI) and, currently, the Brothers of Italy (FdI).

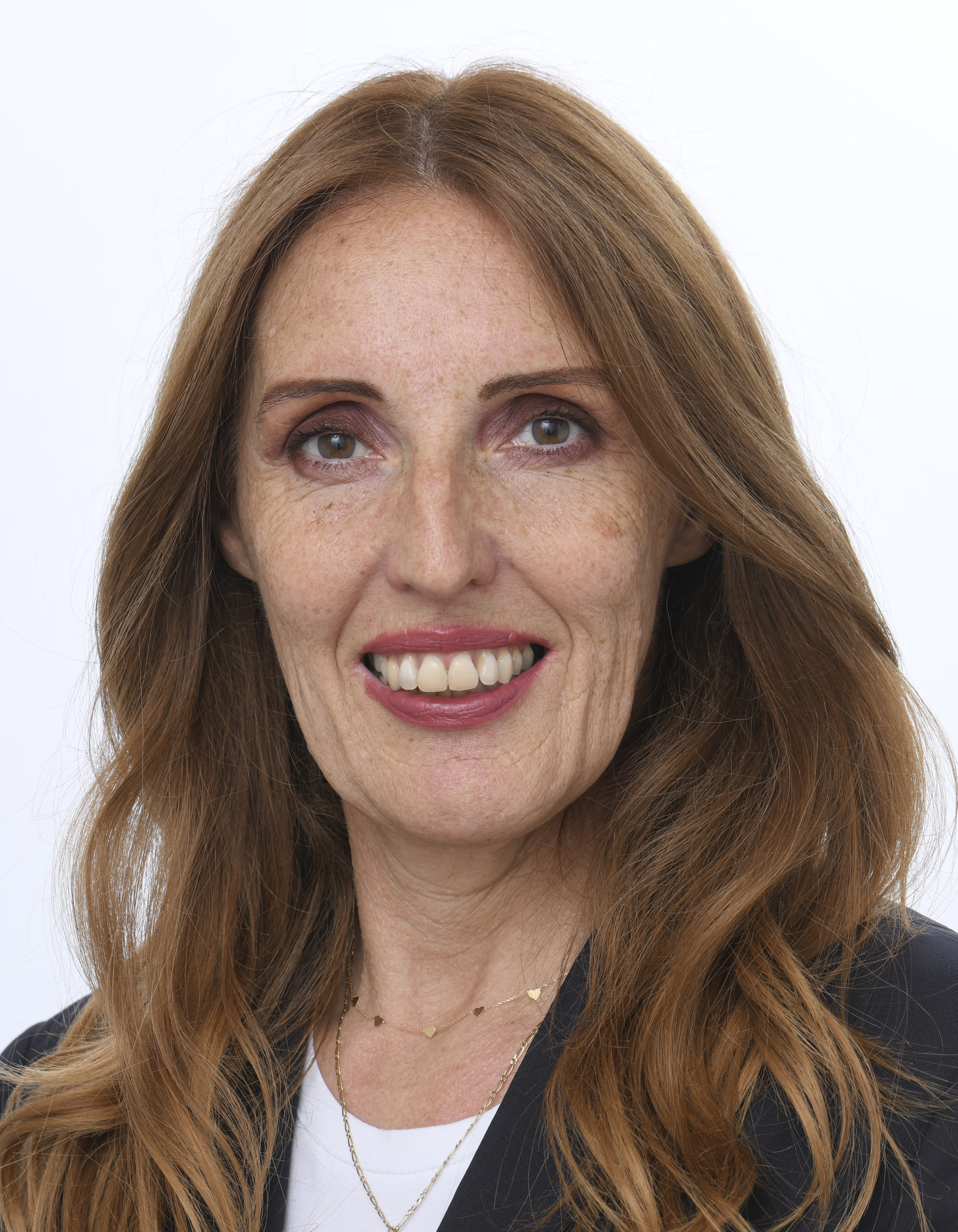
Official portrait, 2024

She was first elected to the Regional Council of Veneto for AN in the 2000 Venetian regional election. Re-elected in 2005 Venetian regional election, she served as regional minister of Education in Giancarlo Galan's third government (2005–2010). Re-elected in the 2010 Venetian regional election for the PdL, in the 2015 Venetian regional election for FI and, finally, in the 2020 Venetian regional election for FdI, she has served as minister of Education, Formation, Labour and Equal Opportunities in Luca Zaia's first (2010–2015), second (2015–2020) and third governments (2020–present). She is thus the current longest serving regional minister, as well as one of the longest serving ones in Venetian politics.

Donazzan has been described as Italian nationalist, having sung an Italian fascist anthem ("Faccetta nera") during the radio broadcast La Zanzara on 8 January 2021. Often at odds with her Venetian nationalist coalition partner, Liga Veneta, that episode caused her a motion of no confidence that finally did not pass, due to Liga Veneta's abstention.

== Critics ==
=== Controversial statements on Israel (2025) ===
On June 17, 2025, during a speech at the European Parliament, Italian MEP Elena Donazzan (Fratelli d'Italia) sparked controversy by defending Israel’s military operations in the Gaza Strip following the October 7, 2024 attacks. Donazzan stated that "Israel has the courage to do what Europe does not have the courage to do," portraying the bombings as a legitimate act of self-defense.

Her remarks came amid a humanitarian crisis, as the death toll in Gaza had reportedly surpassed 56,000, including thousands of women and children. Despite this, Donazzan claimed that the children killed were "children of terrorists used as human shields."

She also criticized European media, accusing them of failing to report on Israel’s right to defend itself, stating: "European newspapers don’t talk about it." Her statements drew strong reactions from fellow parliamentarians, particularly from the S&D and Green groups, who accused her of dehumanizing civilian victims and called for a reassessment of EU–Israel relations in light of alleged violations of international humanitarian law.

=== Criticism over remarks on mixed marriages (June 2024) ===
In early June 2024, Veneto Regional Councillor and Fratelli d'Italia candidate for the European Parliament, Elena Donazzan, sparked widespread controversy by claiming that mixed marriages between Catholic women and Muslim men "can facilitate infiltration by Islamic terrorism" and warning that "Italy is becoming de-Christianised". She added that "cultures so different, when brought together, can be a problem in a period marked by strong terrorism" and insisted that while Italy may be multi-ethnic, it should not be multicultural.

Her remarks, described as xenophobic and alarmist, prompted immediate backlash from regional political figures: Democratic MP Ouidad Bakkali urged Prime Minister Meloni to publicly distance herself, labeling Donazzan’s words "racist and medieval". Italy Viva's Raffaella Paita similarly condemned the comments as rooted in prejudice. Analysts noted that Donazzan’s stance conflated religious identity with extremism and reinforced damaging stereotypes.
