= Venetian Left (2015) =

Venetian Left Sinistra Veneta
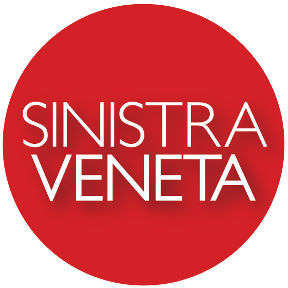
- Leader: Pietrangelo Pettenò
- Founded: March 2015
- Dissolved: February 2017
- Split from: Communist Refoundation Party
- Merged into: Italian Left
- Ideology: Communism
- Political position: Left-wing
- Colours: Red

Venetian Left (Sinistra Veneta, SV) was a communist political party in Veneto. The party was formed in March 2015 by Pietrangelo Pettenò, a three-term member of the Regional Council of Veneto, and the majority of the Venice's municipal section of the Communist Refoundation Party (PRC), notably including Renato Cardazzo and Sebastiano Bonzio.

Pettenò wanted a fourth term as regional councillor and to support Alessandra Moretti of the Democratic Party (PD) for President in the 2015 regional election, instead of running as stand-alone list, as decided by the regional leadership of the PRC. SV participated in the election within the New Veneto (VN) list, endorsed also by the regional sections of Left Ecology and Freedom (SEL) and the Federation of the Greens (FdV). In the election VN obtained a mere 1.1% of the vote and no seats in the Council. Consequently, Pettenò left the assembly after fifteen years.

By February 2017 the party was fully merged into Italian Left.
