= Toward North =

Political party

Toward North (Italian: Verso Nord, VN) is a liberal and federalist political association based in Veneto, Italy.

The group, which seeks to represent all the North by enlarging itself outside Veneto, is a keen proponent of federalism, fiscal reform, free market, competition, private enterprise and justice reform. Its main leader is Massimo Cacciari.

== History ==
=== Background and foundation ===
Between 2008 and 2010 Massimo Cacciari, three times mayor of Venice and leading figure of the centre-left in Veneto, called his Democratic Party (PD) to organize itself as a federalist party, with an autonomous northern wing. Giancarlo Galan, President of Veneto from 1995 to 2010, made similar calls to The People of Freedom (PdL). None of these calls were welcomed by the two main Italian parties and Lega Nord became a major electoral force at the 2008 general election. At the 2010 regional election Liga Veneta–Lega Nord became the largest party in Veneto and Luca Zaia was elected President of the region.

Following the rout of Rome-based parties in Veneto, a manifesto for a new liberal party representing the North was launched on 23 July 2010 in Mogliano Veneto. The ten proponents of Toward North. Italy closer to Europe were: Massimo Cacciari (PD), Giuseppe Bortolussi (PD, 2010 candidate for President of Veneto), Achille Variati (PD, mayor of Vicenza), Diego Bottacin (PD, regional councillor), Maurizio Fistarol (PD, senator and former mayor of Belluno), Alessio Vianello (ApV, ex-PD, former deputy mayor of Venice), Franco Miracco (PdL, spokesman of Giancarlo Galan), Mario Bertolissi (PdL, professor of constitutional law at the University of Padua), Maria Gomierato (UDC, former mayor of Castelfranco Veneto), Francesco Giuliari (ApV, former deputy), Enrico Zardini (PD) and Enrico Zanetti (PD).

=== Enlargement to other regions ===
In October 2012 Vianello was elected president of VN, which started to be organized as a party. At the same time Bottacin left the PD in order to concentrate himself to the new party. Bortolussi, Bottacin, Mariangelo Foggiato (North-East Union) and the three regional councillors of the Union of the Centre formed a cross-group alliance. In December Fistarol left the group of the PD in the Senate in order to become a full representative of VN. A third regional councillor, Andrea Causin, left the PD and joined VN soon. The party made inroads also in Piedmont, where MEP Gianluca Susta left the PD and became regional leader of VN.

After having dropped the idea of becoming the regional section of Alliance for Italy in order to replace Alliance for Veneto, Cacciari hinted that VN may become the regional section of Future Italy (Italia Futura), a think-tank and would-be party led by Luca Cordero di Montezemolo.

Between September 2011 and March 2012 the party formed regional wings in Piedmont (Piedmont at the Centre, led by Gianluca Susta), Lombardy (Lombards Toward North), and Emilia-Romagna. In Lombardy VN was joined by three well-known former members of Lega Lombarda–Lega Nord: Alessandro Cè (a former party leader in the Chamber of Deputies and regional minister of Health), Sergio Rossi (a former senator), and Marisa Bedoni (a former deputy mayor of Milan under Marco Formentini). A former leader and senator of Lega Nord Emilia, Pierluigi Copercini, joined the party in Emilia–Romagna.

=== From Future Italy to Civic Choice ===
In March 2012 several members of VN took part to the founding of the Venetian section of Montezemolo's Future Italy. Causin was appointed regional coordinator, along with Manfredi Ravetto and Jacopo Silva, while Vianello, Bottacin and Gomierato were appointed to the regional committee.

Between November 2012 and January 2013 VN, through IF, took part to the founding of Toward the Third Republic (VTR) and was instrumental to the foundation of Mario Monti's Civic Choice (SC). At the 2013 general election SC garnered 8.3% of the vote. Several VN leading members, notably including Causin, Zanetti and Susta, were elected to the Italian Parliament, while others, like Fistarol, failed re-election.

== Leadership ==
- Coordinator: Alessio Vianello (2010–...)
