= Cristina Guarda =

Italian politician (born 1990)

Cristina Guarda MEP
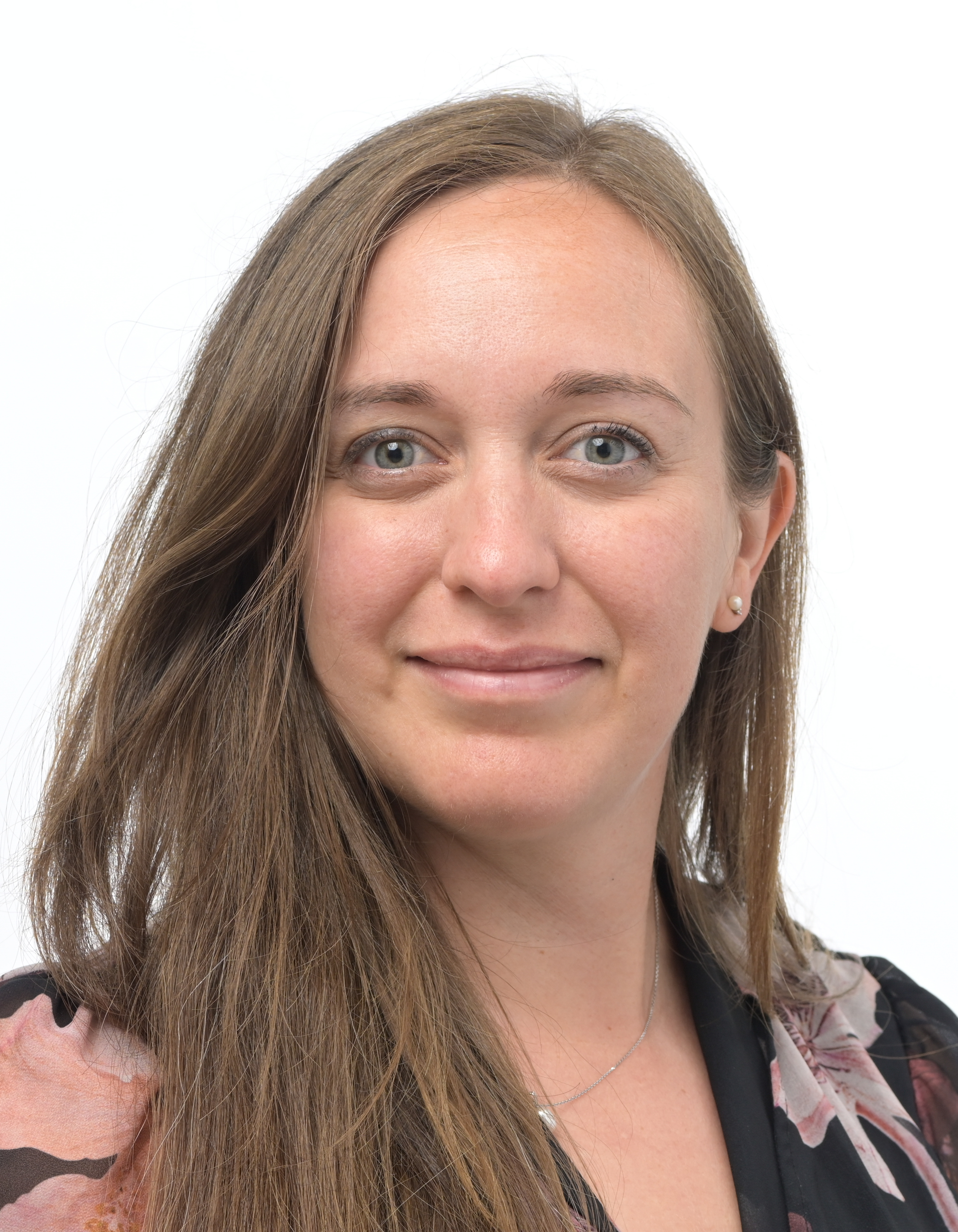

Member of the European Parliament
- Incumbent
- Assumed office 16 July 2024
- Constituency: North-East Italy

Personal details
- Born: 3 March 1990 (age 36)
- Party: Green Europe
- Other political affiliations: European Green Party

Cristina Guarda (born 3 March 1990) is an Italian politician of Green Europe who was elected member of the European Parliament in 2024. She was elected to the Regional Council of Veneto in 2015, and re-elected in 2020.
