= Lucio Tiozzo =

Italian politician (born 1956)

Lucio Tiozzo (Chioggia, 12 October 1956) is an Italian politician from Veneto.

A long-time member of the left wing of the Italian Socialist Party (for which he was Mayor of Chioggia from 1988 to 1991), in the 1990s Tiozzo joined the post-communist Democrats of the Left and, in 2007, the Democratic Party. He was elected to the Regional Council of Veneto in 2000, 2005 and 2010.
