= Giovanna Negro =

Italian politician

Giovanna Negro (San Bonifacio, 18 August 1976) is a Venetist politician from Veneto, Italy.

A member of Liga Veneta–Lega Nord, Negro was thrice mayor of Altivole and a member of the Chamber of Deputies from 2008 to 2013, when she was not re-elected.

In March 2015 Negro followed her mentor Flavio Tosi out of the party and in the following regional election she was elected to the Regional Council of Veneto for Il Veneto del Fare, a list linked to the Tosi List for Veneto, in the province of Verona. In 2019 she re-joined the LV, but was not re-elected in 2020.
