= Marino Zorzato =

Italian politician

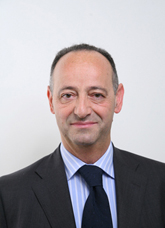
Marino Zorzato in 2008

Marino Zorzato (born 10 May 1956 in Cittadella) is an Italian politician from Veneto.

A long-time Christian Democrat, Zorzato was elected to the Italian Chamber of Deputies for Forza Italia in 2001, 2006, and 2006. Having Forza Italia merged into The People of Freedom in 2008, Zorzato became deputy regional coordinator of the new party.

In the 2010 regional election, Zorzato formed the ticket with Luca Zaia and was elected to the Regional Council of Veneto from Zaia's regional list. Subsequently, he was appointed Vice President of Veneto and regional minister of Culture in Zaia I Government.

In the 2015 regional election, Zorzato, who had joined the New Centre-Right (rebranded New Centre-Right Autonomous Veneto at the Venetian level), was re-elected to the Regional Council and served a second full term, this time in the minority.

Having joined the new Forza Italia in 2019, Zorzato did not stand for re-election in 2020.
