= Alessandra Moretti =

Italian politician (born 1973)

Alessandra Moretti MEP
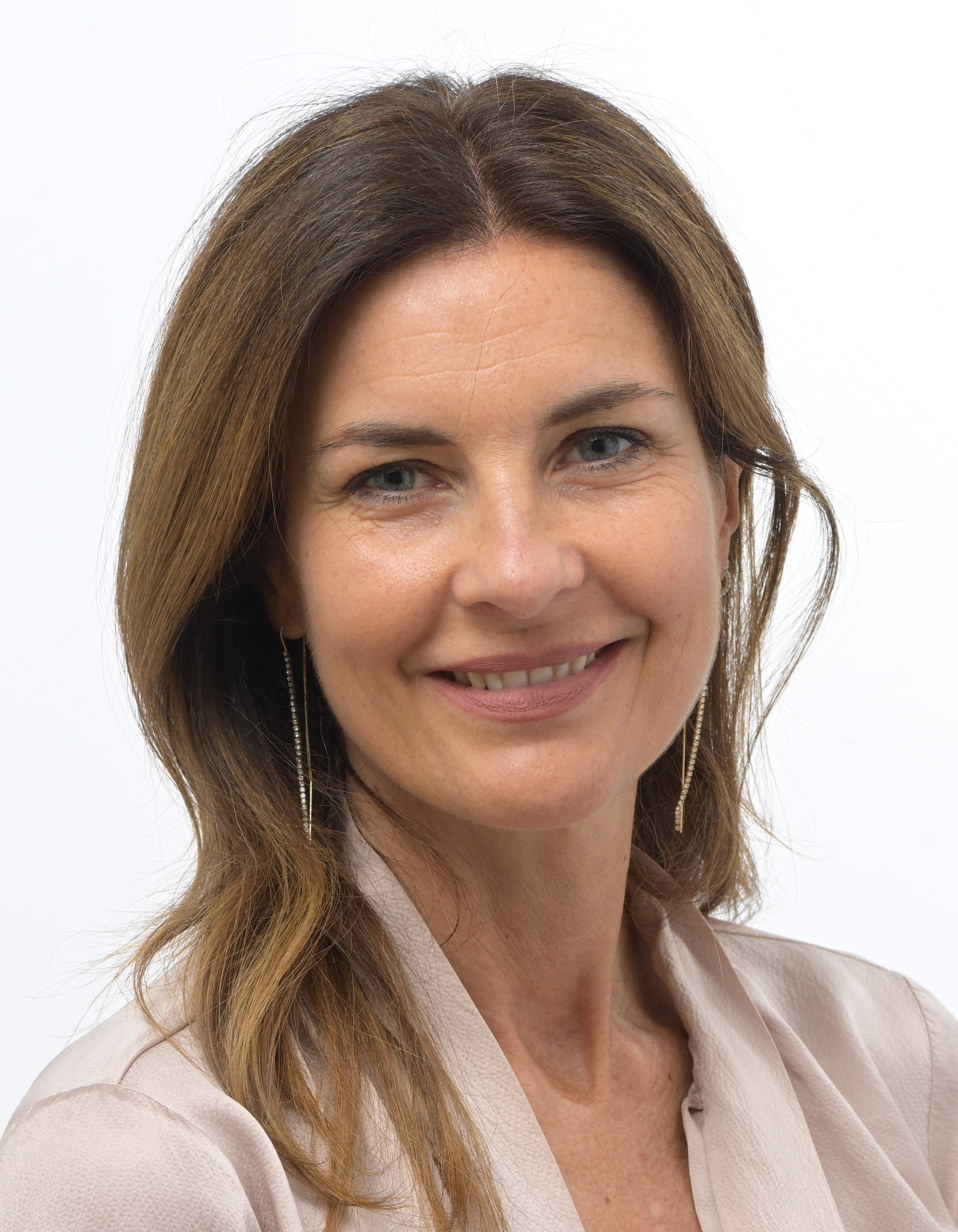

Member of the European Parliament
- Incumbent
- Assumed office 2 July 2019
- Constituency: North-East Italy
- In office 1 July 2014 – 15 January 2015
- Constituency: North-East Italy

Member of the Chamber fo Deputies
- In office 19 March 2013 – 25 June 2014
- Constituency: VII (Veneto 1)

Personal details
- Born: 24 June 1973 (age 53) Vicenza, Italy
- Party: DS (2003–2009); PD (since 2009)
- Education: University of Urbino
- Profession: Politician, Lawyer

Alessandra Moretti (born 24 June 1973) is an Italian politician who has been serving as a Member of the European Parliament since 2019.

== Early life and education ==
Born in Vicenza, Moretti graduated in law at the University of Urbino and began working as a divorce lawyer since 2001.

== Political career ==
Moretti became interested in politics from a young age, following her father, who had been active in the Italian Communist Party (PCI). She first entered politics with the Democrats of the Left (DS). After some failed electoral campaigns (including the 2007 provincial election in Vicenza on a list in support of Giorgio Carollo of Veneto for the European People's Party), Moretti joined the Democratic Party (PD) in 2009 and in 2014 was elected to the municipal council of Vicenza and was appointed Deputy Mayor with delegation for education and youth.

Moretti gained national prominence when she was appointed by Pier Luigi Bersani spokeswoman of his campaign for the 2012 Italian centre-left primary election. In the event, Bersani won the nomination for Prime Minister of Italy but lost the 2013 Italian general election; Moretti was elected to the Chamber of Deputies for the PD. In the 2014 European Parliament election in Veneto, Moretti was elected to the European Parliament but resigned in February 2015 to contest local elections and was replaced by Damiano Zoffoli. In the 2015 Venetian regional election, Moretti ran for President of Veneto but obtained 22.7% of the vote and was defeated by incumbent president Luca Zaia of Northern League, who secured 50.1% of the vote.

In the 2019 European Parliament election, Moretti re-entered the European Parliament. She began serving on the Committee on the Environment, Public Health and Food Safety. She later also joined the Special Committee on Beating Cancer (2020), as well as the Special Committee on the COVID-19 pandemic (2022). In addition to her committee assignments, she was part of the European Parliament's delegation for relations with Japan, a member of the Spinelli Group, and a member of the European Parliament Intergroup on Children's Rights.

In 2025, Moretti would be suspended from the S&D group due to the Qatargate scandal.
