= Federico Sboarina =

Italian politician and lawyer

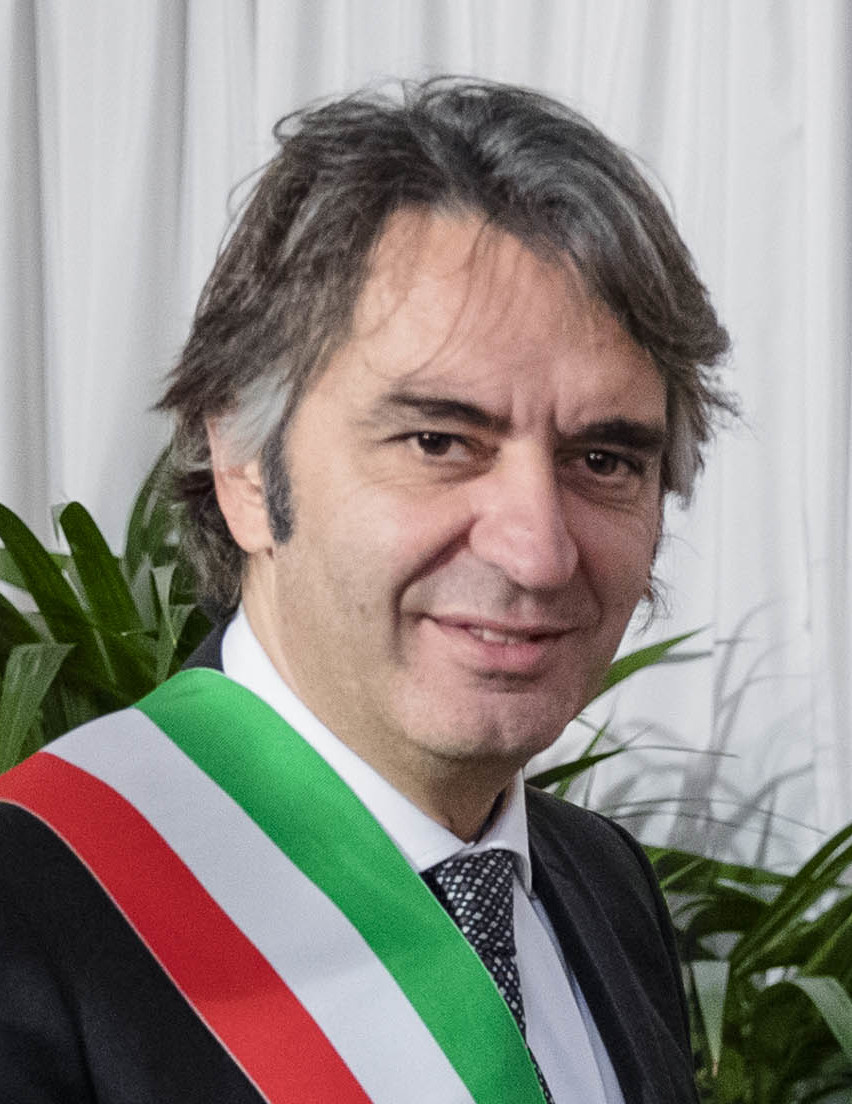

Mayor of Verona
- In office 27 June 2017 – 29 June 2022
- Preceded by: Flavio Tosi
- Succeeded by: Damiano Tommasi

Personal details
- Born: 10 January 1971 (age 55) Verona, Italy
- Party: Brothers of Italy
- Education: University of Trento
- Occupation: Politician, lawyer

Federico Sboarina (born 10 January 1971 in Verona, Italy) is an Italian politician and lawyer. Sboarina was mayor of Verona from 2017 to 2022. He is married and has one child.

In 2002, he was elected for the first time, to the city council in Verona, and was re-elected in 2007. From 2007 to 2012, he was assessor of the City of Verona, with responsibility for Ecology and Environment, and Sports and Leisure. He graduated in law from the University of Trento, and was president of the Veronese section of the Italian Multiple Sclerosis Association for two terms. From 2003 to 2007, he was secretary of the Initiative Group forensic association.

In 2017, Sboarina was elected mayor of Verona to replace outgoing two-term mayor Flavio Tosi. As part of the right-wing coalition with FdI, LN and FI, he beat out Tosi's party F! (formed after his expulsion from LN) candidate Patrizia Bisinella and center-left PD candidate Orietta Salemi in the first round, then defeated Bisinella in the second round, 58.11-41.89.

Like many mayors before, Sboarina's political leanings reflected the city's traditionalist Catholic, conservative stance. Under him, the city was the first in Italy to declare itself pro-life in October 2018, and in 2019, hosted the American Christian right lobby group World Congress of Families' conference.

In 2022, Sboarina ran for re-election to a second term as part of right-wing coalition consisting of FdI, LN and CI. He refused to include FI in the coalition, that instead threw its support behind former mayor Tosi running for re-election as part of F! party. In the first round, Sboarina came second, ahead of Tosi but behind center-left candidate, former Hellas Verona F.C. and A.S. Roma football player and president of Italian Footballers' Association Damiano Tommasi. In the second round, Tommasi, taking advantage of the right-wing split, defeated Sboarina, 53.4-46.6.
