= Leonardo Padrin =

Italian politician

Leonardo Padrin (born 29 August 1959 in Ponso) is an Italian politician from Veneto.

A long-time Christian Democrat and member of Communion and Liberation, in 1995 he joined the United Christian Democrats and in 1998 Forza Italia.

Elected for the first time to Regional Council of Veneto in 2000, he was deputy-leader of Forza Italia's group from 2006 to 2007. A close ally of Giancarlo Galan, Padrin was appointed under-secretary for the Council in Galan III Government. Re-elected for the third term in 2010, he sat in the group of The People of Freedom.

In 2015 Padrin, who had joined the new Forza Italia in 2013, left for the Tosi List for Veneto, but chose not stand for re-election.
