= Piero Ruzzante =

Italian politician

Piero Ruzzante (Padua, 11 June 1963) is an Italian politician from Veneto.

A long-time member of the Italian Communist Party (PCI), the Democratic Party of the Left (PDS) and the Democrats of the Left (DS), Ruzzante was municipal councillor in Padua from 1985 to 1998. He also served as provincial secretary of the Italian Communist Youth Federation (1984–1988) and of the PDS (1995–1998).

In 1996 and 2001 he was elected to the Chamber of Deputies. From 2006, when he did not stand for re-election, to 2010, Ruzzante worked as director-general of the parliamentary groups of The Olive Tree and the Democratic Party (PD).

In the 2010 regional election he returned to elective politics and was elected to the Regional Council of Veneto for the PD. He was re-elected in 2015.
