= Clodovaldo Ruffato =

Italian politician

Clodovaldo Ruffato (Santa Giustina in Colle, 8 May 1953) is an Italian politician from Veneto.

A long-time Christian Democrat and close ally of Vittorio Casarin, he was first elected to the Regional Council of Veneto in 2005 for Forza Italia. Re-elected in 2010 for The People of Freedom, he was elected President of the Regional Council by the assembly.
