= Leonardo Muraro =

Italian politician

- Born: Leonardo Muraro; 8 August 1955 (age 70); Mogliano Veneto (Italy)
- Occupation: politician
- Height: 1.70 m (5 ft 7 in)

Leonardo Muraro (Mogliano Veneto, 8 August 1955) is an Italian Venetist politician. He is a leading member of Liga Veneta–Lega Nord.

A long-time member of Liga Veneta, Muraro was appointed Vice President of the Province of Treviso by President Luca Zaia, who led a monocolor government, in 2002. Three years later, when Zaia was elevated to Vice President of Veneto, Muraro became acting President of the Province. On 29 May 2006 he was elected President on a special election with the 57.3% of the vote. On 16 May 2011 Muraro was easily re-elected for another five-year term with 57.5% of the vote.
