= Diego Bottacin =

Italian politician from Veneto

Diego Bottacin (Noale, 7 September 1959) is an Italian politician from Veneto.

In the 1980s Bottacin started his political career in the early green movements and in 1992 he was elected Mayor of Mogliano Veneto, an office he held until 2005. From 2002 to 2007 he was regional coordinator of Democracy is Freedom – The Daisy (DL). He was elected to the Regional Council of Veneto in 2005 for DL and in 2010 for the Democratic Party (PD), the party he had contributed to establish in Veneto. A keen federalist, autonomist and centrist, in 2010 he was a founding member of Toward North and finally left the PD, which he considered too left-wing.
