= 2015 Venetian regional election =

Italian regional election

- 31 May 2015

All 51 seats to the Regional Council
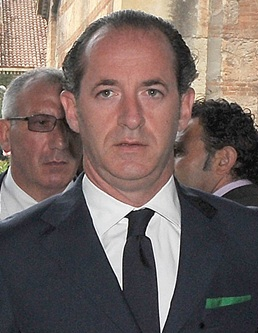

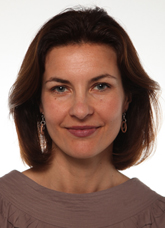

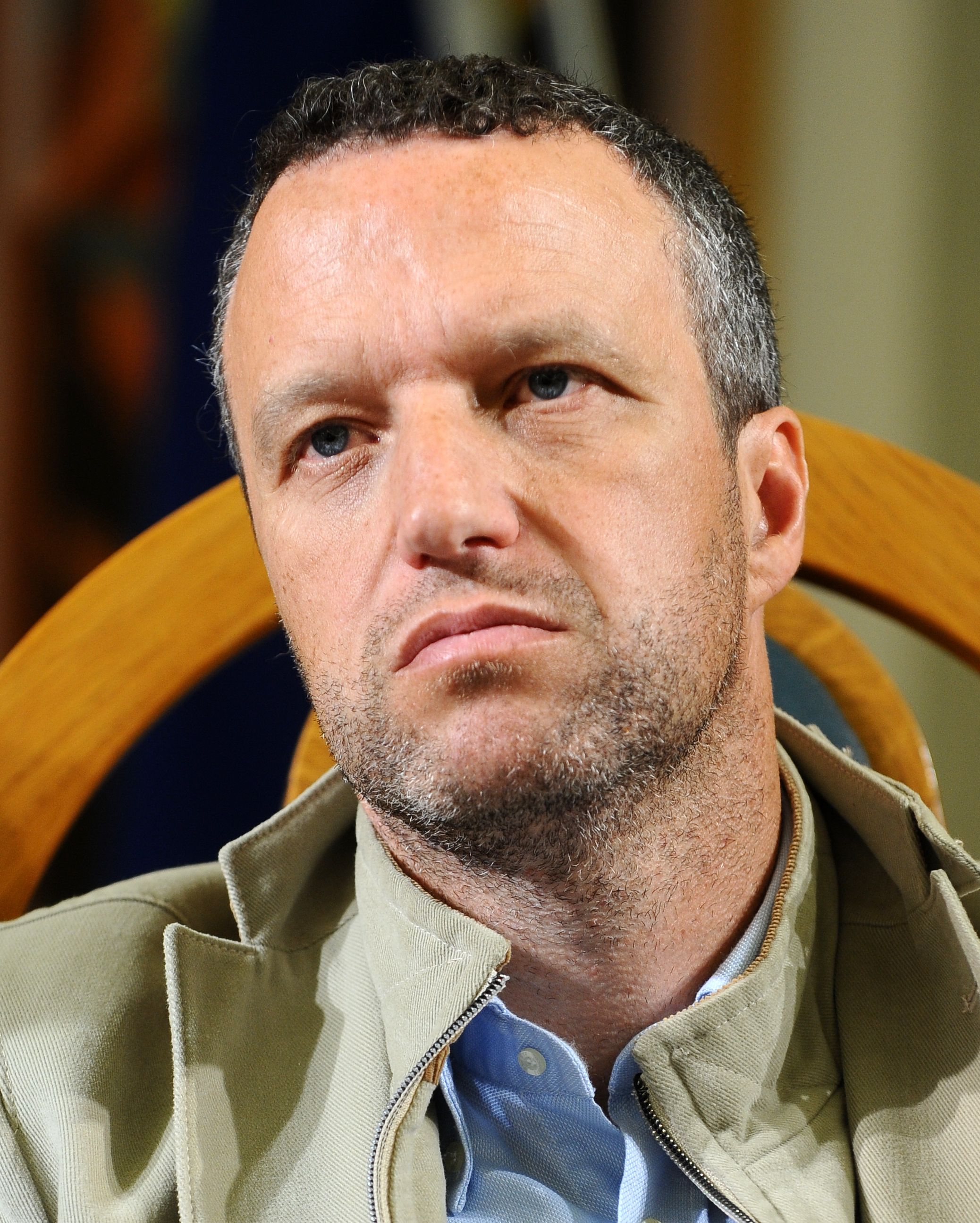
	Majority party	Minority party
Leader	Luca Zaia	Alessandra Moretti
Party	Northern League	Democratic Party
Alliance	Centre-right	Centre-left
Seats won	29	12
Seat change	▼8	▼7
Popular vote	1,108,065	503,147
Percentage	50.10%	22.70%
Swing	▼10.06%	▼6.38%
	Third party	Fourth party
Leader	Jacopo Berti	Flavio Tosi
Party	Five Star Movement	Tosi List for Veneto
Alliance		LTV–AP–Others
Seats won	5	5
Seat change	▲5	▲1
Popular vote	262,749	262,569
Percentage	11.88%	11.87%
Swing	▲8.72%	▲5.48%
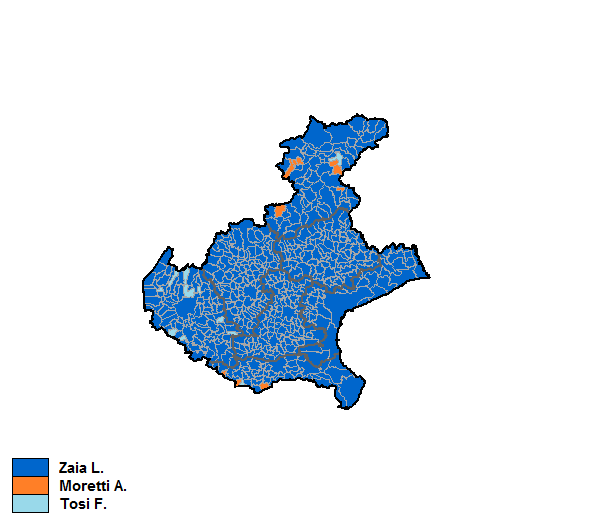
- Electoral results for area: blue for Zaia, orange for Moretti, light blue for Tosi
President before election
Luca Zaia
Lega Nord
Subsequent President
Luca Zaia
Lega Nord

The Venetian regional election of 2015 took place in Veneto on 31 May 2015, as part of a big round of regional elections in Italy. Venetian voters elected their President and their Regional Council, whose members had been reduced to 51, including the President.

Luca Zaia, incumbent President (elected in 2010 with 60.2% of the vote) and leading member of the Northern League (LN), was re-elected by a reduced majority, due to a split occurred within his party in the run-up of the election, but, despite this, his victory over Alessandra Moretti of the Democratic Party (PD), who fared quite badly, was still a landslide: 50.1% to 22.7%. The election was a personal triumph for Zaia, who was the most voted President among the seven elected on 31 May. Other two candidates, Jacopo Berti of the Five Star Movement (M5S) and Flavio Tosi of the Tosi List for Veneto (LTV), the splinter group from the LN, got more than 10% of the vote and finished both at 11.9%. A fifth, Alessio Morosin of Venetian Independence (IV), and a sixth, Laura Coletti of the Communist Refoundation Party (PRC), won 2.5% and 0.9% of the vote, respectively.

Among the parties, the LN, which presented an official list and a list named after Zaia (however composed mainly of party members), improved its 2010's performance, by gaining 40.9% of the vote (combined result of the two lists, which obtained 17.8% and 23.1%, respectively). If the two LN-related lists are counted together, the PD came second with 16.7% of the vote (20.5% if Moretti's personal list is counted) and the M5S third with 10.4%. The combined score of the two lists connected to the LTV was 7.1%, while the once-mighty Forza Italia (heir of The People of Freedom and, before that, the original Forza Italia) stopped at 6.0%.

The total score of Venetist and regional parties, a diverse field including the Liga Veneta, the LTV, Venetian Independence, Independence We Veneto, the North-East Union, Autonomous Veneto Project and Veneto Confederal State, was 54.3%, then a record.

== Electoral system ==
The new electoral system of Veneto was regulated by the regional law 5/2012. The assembly was made up of 50 councilors (including the candidate for president who came second), plus the president proclaimed elected. After the elimination of the president's list, the distribution of seats remained proportional (with the D'Hondt method), but with a variable majority premium: the winning coalition is assigned 29 seats if it manages to exceed 50% of the preferences; 28 seats if he got between 40% and 50% of the votes; only 27 if it remained below 40%. A 3% threshold was set for single lists or lists belonging to coalitions that did not exceed 5% of the votes.

== Parties and candidates ==
=== Candidates ===
- Luca Zaia (Veneto 2015), incumbent President and former minister of Agriculture;
- Alessandra Moretti (Alessandra Moretti for President), former member of the Chamber of Deputies and MEP;
- Jacopo Berti (Five Star Movement), entrepreneur and activist;
- Flavio Tosi (Flavio Tosi for President), mayor of Verona and former regional minister of Health;
- Alessio Morosin (Morosin for President), former regional councillor;
- Laura Coletti (The Other Veneto), teacher and activist.

=== Coalitions and parties ===
Political party or alliance	Constituent lists	Previous result		Candidate
Political party or alliance	Constituent lists	Votes (%)	Seats	Candidate
Centre-right coalition	Northern League – Venetian League (LN–LV)	35.2	18	Luca Zaia
Centre-right coalition	Forza Italia (FI)	24.7	13	Luca Zaia
Centre-right coalition	Zaia for President (ZP)	—N/a	—N/a	Luca Zaia
Centre-right coalition	Independence We Veneto (INV)	—N/a	—N/a	Luca Zaia
Centre-right coalition	Brothers of Italy (FdI)	—N/a	—N/a	Luca Zaia
Centre-left coalition	Democratic Party (PD)	20.3	14	Alessandra Moretti
Centre-left coalition	Autonomous Veneto Project (PVA)	0.2	–	Alessandra Moretti
Centre-left coalition	Moretti for President (MP)	—N/a	—N/a	Alessandra Moretti
Centre-left coalition	Civic Veneto (incl. PSI, SC and IdV)	—N/a	—N/a	Alessandra Moretti
Centre-left coalition	New Veneto (SEL – European Greens – SV)	—N/a	—N/a	Alessandra Moretti
Centrist coalition	Popular Area (NCD – UDC)	4.9	3	Flavio Tosi
Centrist coalition	North-East Union (UNE)	1.5	1	Flavio Tosi
Centrist coalition	Tosi List for Veneto (LTV)	—N/a	—N/a	Flavio Tosi
Centrist coalition	Veneto of Acting	—N/a	—N/a	Flavio Tosi
Centrist coalition	Pensioners' Family (FP)	—N/a	—N/a	Flavio Tosi
Centrist coalition	Breed Piave – Veneto Confederal State	—N/a	—N/a	Flavio Tosi
Five Star Movement (M5S)		2.6	–	Jacopo Berti
The Other Veneto (incl. PRC and PCdI)		1.6	1	Laura Coletti
Venetian Independence (IV)		—N/a	—N/a	Alessio Morosin

== Results ==
31 May 2015 Venetian regional election results
Candidates	Votes	%	Seats	Parties	Votes	%	Seat
Luca Zaia	1,108,065	50.09	1				
Luca Zaia	1,108,065	50.09	1	Zaia for President	427,363	23.09	13
Luca Zaia	1,108,065	50.09	1	Northern League – Venetian League	329,966	17.83	10
Luca Zaia	1,108,065	50.09	1	Forza Italia	110,573	5.97	3
Luca Zaia	1,108,065	50.09	1	Independence We Veneto	49,929	2.70	1
Luca Zaia	1,108,065	50.09	1	Brothers of Italy	48,163	2.60	1
Luca Zaia	1,108,065	50.09	1	Total	965,994	52.19	28
Alessandra Moretti	503,147	22.74	1				
Alessandra Moretti	503,147	22.74	1	Democratic Party	308,438	16.66	8
Alessandra Moretti	503,147	22.74	1	Moretti for President	70,764	3.82	2
Alessandra Moretti	503,147	22.74	1	Civic Veneto	26,903	1.45	1
Alessandra Moretti	503,147	22.74	1	New Veneto (SEL – European Greens – SV)	20,282	1.10	–
Alessandra Moretti	503,147	22.74	1	Autonomous Veneto Project	6,242	0.34	–
Alessandra Moretti	503,147	22.74	1	Total	432,629	23.37	11
Jacopo Berti	262,749	11.88	–	Five Star Movement	192,630	10.41	5
Flavio Tosi	262,569	11.87	–				
Flavio Tosi	262,569	11.87	–	Tosi List for Veneto	105,836	5.72	3
Flavio Tosi	262,569	11.87	–	Popular Area (NCD – UDC)	37,937	2.05	1
Flavio Tosi	262,569	11.87	–	Veneto of Acting	26,119	1.41	1
Flavio Tosi	262,569	11.87	–	Pensioners' Family	14,625	0.79	–
Flavio Tosi	262,569	11.87	–	North-East Union	11,173	0.60	–
Flavio Tosi	262,569	11.87	–	Breed Piave – Veneto Confederal State	3,487	0.19	–
Flavio Tosi	262,569	11.87	–	Total	199,177	10.76	5
Alessio Morosin	55,760	2.52	–	Venetian Independence	46,578	2.52	–
Laura Coletti	19,914	0.90	–	The Other Veneto	13,997	0.76	–
Total candidates	2,212,204	100.00	2	Total parties	1,851,005	100.00	49
Source: Ministry of the Interior

=== Council composition ===
Distribution of Seats in the Regional Council
Political Group	Leader	2015	2020
Liga Veneta–Lega Nord	Nicola Finco	11	12
Zaia for President (Note: All the group members were affiliated to Liga Veneta–Lega Nord. See https://www.larena.it/territori/citt%C3%A0/valdegamberipassa-nel-gruppo-misto-1.5531130.) (Note: Three members left the group for technical reasons: Nicola Finco in order to lead the group of Liga Veneta–Lega Nord, Stefano Valdegamberi to balance the composition of the Mixed Group, and Fabiano Barbisan to help the formation of the Venetian Centre-Right group.)	Silvia Rizzotto	13	10
Venetian Democratic Party	Alessandra Moretti / Stefano Fracasso	9	7
Five Star Movement	rotational leadership	5	4
Brothers of Italy (Note: The group was originally composed of just one member, Sergio Berlato, who left in February 2020 in order to become an MEP. He was replaced by Joe Formaggio. Contextually, the group was joined by Andrea Bassi and Stefano Casali, splinters of Tosi List for Veneto and, later, founding members of Venetian Centre-Right. The party counts two more councillors, Elena Donazzan and Massimo Giorgetti, who were splinters from Forza Italia and continue to sit in their original group. Af sixth coincillor, Massimiliano Barison, was a member of Brothers of Italy and the group from January 2018 to June 2019.)	Sergio Berlato / Andrea Bassi	1	3
Forza Italia / More Italy!–I Love Veneto (Note: The remaining two members of the group, Massimo Giorgetti and Elena Donazzan, were no longer affiliated to Forza Italia by mid 2018, both citing disagreements with the party's regional leadership. In December 2018 Donazzan launched I Love Veneto. In February 2019 Giorgetti joined Brothers of Italy, but chose not to join that party's group and to maintain his affiliation with Donazzan. In March 2019 the name of the group was finally changed. In June 2019 also Donazzan joined Brothers of Italy.)	Massimiliano Barison / Massimo Giorgetti	3	2
Civic Veneto / United Venetians	Pietro Dalla Libera (Note: Founding member Piero Dalla Libera was elected as part of the centre-left coalition and then switched its allegiance to the majority led by President Luca Zaia. In June 2019 he was joined by Massimiliano Barison, a former member of Forza Italia and Brothers of Italy.)	1	2
Tosi List for Veneto / Veneto for Autonomy–Forza Italia	Stefano Casali / Maurizio Conte (Note: Maurizio Conte joined Forza Italia in August 2017, but was not able to add the party's name to that of the group until March 2019.)	3	1
Moretti President / Civic List for Veneto	Franco Ferrari	2	1
NCD–UdC–Popular Area / Popular Area–Forza Italia	Marino Zorzato (Note: Marino Zorzato joined Forza Italia in November 2018, but was not able to add the party's name to that of the group until March 2019.)	1	1
Independence We Veneto / We Are Veneto / Party of Venetians	Antonio Guadagnini	1	1
Veneto of Acting / Veneto Autonomous Heart	Giovanna Negro	1	1
Venetian Centre-Right (Note: The group was formed in May 2017 by Fabiano Barbisan of Liga Veneta, who joined the group for technical purposes, and two splinters of the Tosi List for Veneto, Andrea Bassi and Stefano Casali. In February 2020 the latter two joined Brothers of Italy and the group was thus dissolved.)	Stefano Casali / Andrea Bassi	0	0
Mixed Group (Note: Final members: Piero Ruzzante, splinter of the Democratic Party and member of Article One; Stefano Valdegamberi, a former member of the Union of Christian and Centre Democrats and elect of the Zaia for President list in 2015 (he officially joined Liga Veneta in June 2020); Patrizia Bartelle, splinter of the Five Star Movement and member of Italia in Comune; Fabiano Barbisan, a member of Liga Veneta who had been a member of Venetian Centre-Right from May 2017 to February 2020; Cristina Guarda, a member of the Federation of Greens; and Orietta Salemi, a member of Italia Viva. Ruzzante's latest affiliation was with "The Veneto We Want" (a grouping formed by Arturo Lorenzoni; Valdegamberi's Tzimbar Earde, "Cimbrian Land", due to his Cimbrian roots; Bertelle's "Veneto Ecology Solidarity".)	Piero Ruzzante	0	6

Sources: Regional Council of Veneto – Groups and Regional Council of Veneto – Members

== Aftermath ==
Following the election, Luca Zaia formed his second government, composed of ten ministers, nine of Liga Veneta and one of Forza Italia.

Zaia II Government
Office	Name	Party
President	Luca Zaia	Liga Veneta
Vice President	Gianluca Forcolin (until August 2020)	Liga Veneta
Minister of Budget and Local Government	Gianluca Forcolin (until August 2020)	Liga Veneta
Minister of Health and Social Programs	Luca Coletto (until December 2018)	Liga Veneta
Minister of Health and Social Programs	Manuela Lanzarin (since January 2019)	Liga Veneta
Minister of Economic Development and Energy	Roberto Marcato	Liga Veneta
Minister of Public Works, Infrastructures and Transports	Elisa De Berti	Liga Veneta
Minister of Agriculture, Hunting and Fishing	Giuseppe Pan	Liga Veneta
Minister of Education and Labour	Elena Donazzan	Forza Italia (until 2018); Brothers of Italy (since 2019)
Minister of Social Affairs	Manuela Lanzarin	Liga Veneta
Minister of EU Programs, Tourism and International Trade	Federico Caner	Liga Veneta
Minister of Environment and Civil Protection	Gianpaolo Bottacin	Liga Veneta
Minister of Culture, City Planning and Security	Cristiano Corazzari	Liga Veneta

Source: Region of Veneto — The Regional Government from 1970 until today
