= Maurizio Conte =

Italian politician

Maurizio Conte (born 22 September 1964 in San Martino di Lupari) is a Venetist politician from Veneto, Italy.

A member of Liga Veneta–Lega Nord since 1993, Conte was first elected to the Regional Council of Veneto in 2000. From 2001 to 2010 Conte was also secretary of the party for the Province of Padua. Re-elected for a third term to the Council in 2010, he was appointed regional minister of Environment in Zaia I Government.

In 2015 Conte left Liga Veneta in order to join the Tosi List for Veneto and, in the following regional election, was re-elected to the Regional Council for the new party.
