= Renzo Marangon =

Italian politician

Renzo Marangon (born 29 July 1955 in Porto Tolle) is an Italian politician from Veneto.

A member of Christian Democracy since 1974, he entered the Regional Council of Veneto in 1993, in replacement of Giulio Veronese. In 1993, he was also briefly Mayor of Rovigo. In 1994, he joined the United Christian Democrats and was elected to the council the following year. Re-elected in 2000 for Forza Italia (party which he had joined in 1998), he was floor leader of the party for five years. From 2005 to 2010 he was regional minister of Territorial Affairs in Galan III Government. In 2010, having joined The People of Freedom, he was not re-elected to Regional Council, but re-entered the Council in 2014 by replacing his rival Maria Luisa Coppola.

== Biography ==
A member of the Christian Democracy (Italy) party since 1974, he served as provincial and regional secretary of the youth movement and, for many years, as a city councillor in Rovigo, also holding the position of council member on several occasions.

In 1993, he was elected mayor of the city, succeeding Lorenzo Liviero, but resigned in November when he took a seat on the Veneto Regional Council, replacing Giulio Veronese. From 1995, he served as the leader of the United Christian Democrats, before joining Forza Italia in 1998. Re-elected to the Regional Council in 2000, he served as the leader of Forza Italia for the entire legislative term.

He ran in the 2004 provincial elections for the office of president of the Province of Rovigo, but received 37.26% of the vote, compared to 50.48% for the incumbent president, Federico Saccardin of the centre-left; he nevertheless served on the provincial council until the end of the term in June 2009.

In the 2005 regional elections, he was re-elected to the regional council and joined Giancarlo Galan administration as regional councillor for urban planning and territorial policies. Running again in the 2010 regional elections with Il Popolo della Libertà, he was the first of the candidates not elected, but he nevertheless managed to briefly serve on the council starting in 2014, replacing Maria Luisa Coppola.
