= Arturo Lorenzoni =

Italian academic (born 1966)

- Born: September 19, 1966 (age 59); Padova, Italy
- Occupations: Academic, Researcher, Former Vice-Mayor, Regional Councilor
- Years active: 1993–present
- Employer: University of Padova
- Known for: Work in Energy Economics, Electricity Markets, Renewable Energy
- Title: Professor of Applied Economics
- Children: 3

Arturo Lorenzoni (born September 19, 1966) is an Italian academic, researcher, and politician, known for his significant contributions to energy economics, particularly in electricity markets and renewable energy. He has been an Associate Professor of Applied Economics at the University of Padova since 2006, specializing in energy economics and electricity market economics.

== Early life and education ==
Lorenzoni was born in Padova, Italy. He completed his studies in Electrical Engineering at the University of Padova, graduating in 1991. He then obtained a specializing Master's degree in Energy Economics and the Environment from the Scuola Superiore Enrico Mattei, followed by a PhD in Energy Engineering from the University of Padova in 1995.

== Academic career ==
Lorenzoni began his career as a research fellow at IEFE, Università Commerciale Luigi Bocconi, focusing on energy economics. Since 2006, he has been an associate professor at the University of Padova. His research interests include the economics and policy of electric markets, renewable energy investments, and energy efficiency. He leads the Energy Economics Group at the Department of Industrial Engineering.

== Political career ==
From 2017 to 2020, Lorenzoni served as the deputy mayor of Padova, overseeing urban planning, mobility, private building initiatives, information technology systems, the digital agenda, and university relations. Since 2020 Lorenzoni seats in Consiglio Regionale del Veneto as leader of the opposition. With other administrators and mayors of Regione del Veneto Lorenzoni is working to a civic network named Vale.

== Professional engagements ==
Lorenzoni co-founded Galileia S.r.l., a spin-off company from the University of Padova that focused on renewable energy and energy efficiency from 2008 to 2020. He has played a significant role in various EU policy projects and has taught extensively on topics related to sustainable development and energy policy across various international platforms. He is consultant to many energy companies and public utilities. In 2024 he became a board member of Espe s.p.a.

== Publications ==
Lorenzoni has authored more than 150 publications, with significant works including:

- "Principles of Electricity Markets Economics" - 2020
- "A new measure of Italian hidden energy poverty" - Energy Policy, 2020
- Numerous other peer-reviewed articles on renewable energy and policy analysis.

== Honors and awards ==
Throughout his career, Lorenzoni has received accolades for his academic contributions and public service.

== Personal life ==
Lorenzoni is married with three children and is fluent in Italian and English.
