= Damiano Tommasi =

Italian footballer and politician (born 1974)

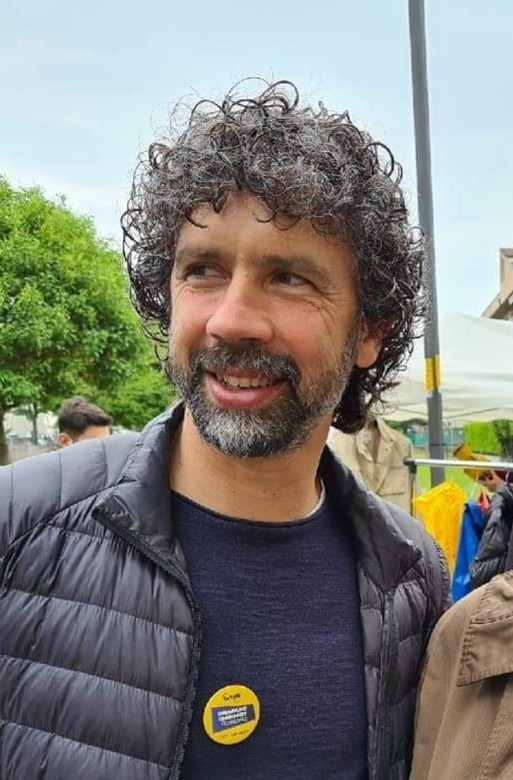

Mayor of Verona
- Incumbent
- Assumed office 29 June 2022
- Preceded by: Federico Sboarina

Personal details
- Born: 17 May 1974 (age 52) Negrar, Italy
- Party: Centre-left independent
- Profession: Footballer, sports manager
Association football career
- Date of birth: 17 May 1974 (age 52)
- Place of birth: Negrar, Italy
- Height: 1.79 m (5 ft 10 in)
- Position: Midfielder
Youth career
- 1991–1993: Verona
Senior career*
Years	Team	Apps	(Gls)
1993–1996	Verona	77	(4)
1996–2006	Roma	263	(14)
2006–2008	Levante	44	(1)
2008	Queens Park Rangers	7	(0)
2009	Tianjin TEDA	29	(1)
2009–2022	Sant'Anna d'Alfaedo	10	(2)
2015	La Fiorita	0	(0)
International career
1994–1996	Italy U21	4	(0)
1998–2003	Italy	25	(2)
Medal record
Men's football
Representing Italy
UEFA European Under-21 Championship
Winner	1996 Spain
- * Club domestic league appearances and goals

Damiano Tommasi (Italian pronunciation: [daˈmjaːno tomˈmaːzi]; born 17 May 1974) is an Italian politician and former professional footballer who is the mayor of Verona.

A defensive midfielder during his footballing years, after a decade at Roma – winning the 2001 Serie A title – he continued his career abroad, going on to play for teams in three countries until his retirement from professional football at the age of 37. He amassed Serie A totals of 262 games and 14 goals.

Tommasi earned 25 caps for Italy, and was a member of the team that took part in the 2002 World Cup.

He successively served as the president of the Italian Footballers' Association between 2011 and 2020, before starting a political career the following year and being elected Mayor of Verona in the 2022 local elections.

== Club career ==
Born in Negrar, Province of Verona, Tommasi started his professional career with local club Hellas Verona, in Serie B. He made his Serie A debut on 7 September 1996 with AS Roma in a 3–1 win over Piacenza Calcio, and would be an instrumental figure in the side's 2001 conquest of the scudetto, with manager Fabio Capello even labelling him as the team's most important player.

During a summer friendly match against Stoke City in 2004, Tommasi suffered a serious knee injury in a collision with Gerry Taggart, and was out of action long-term. In the summer of 2005 he accepted a one-year contract extension, with youth player wages (€1,500 a month) – a contract which he instigated himself in the name of fairness. He finally returned to play on 30 October 2005, coming on as a second-half substitute for Olivier Dacourt during a league match against Ascoli Calcio 1898 and being hailed with a long standing ovation by the Roma supporters.

On 27 November 2005, Tommasi scored after just two minutes in an eventual 1–1 home draw against ACF Fiorentina, being an important first-team member as Roma finished runner-up. After ten years with the club, in July 2006 he joined Levante UD in Spain, spending two seasons with the La Liga strugglers, eventually ending in relegation in 2007–08.

On 10 September 2008, Tommasi agreed a one-year deal with English Football League Championship team Queens Park Rangers. On 9 January 2009, his contract was terminated by mutual consent and, after advanced talks with Chinese Super League's Tianjin TEDA, he signed for the club early in the following month, citing an interest in a third experience abroad as the main reason for it.

After one season, 35-year-old Tommasi left Teda and decided to return to Italy, joining amateurs Sant'Anna d'Alfaedo (Seconda Categoria), where he played alongside his two brothers. He made his debut with the team on 13 December 2009; he came out of retirement nearly six years later, with SP La Fiorita of San Marino. He stated on his decision: "It's a challenge that La Fiorita have given me the chance to experience all over again. I've been looking forward to this Europa League draw for ages now. Let's hope it will be a beautiful adventure and that I can add another chapter to my football career", and went to feature in their campaign in the UEFA Europa League campaign against FC Vaduz.

== International career ==
Tommasi played for the Italy under-21 team that won the 1996 UEFA European Championship, also being picked for that year's Summer Olympic Games in Atlanta where he made three appearances. He made his debut for the senior side on 18 November 1998, under Dino Zoff, in a 2–2 home draw against Spain, but did not become a regular team member until 2001.

After featuring prominently during the Azzurri's 2002 FIFA World Cup qualifying campaign, Tommasi was picked by manager Giovanni Trapattoni for the squad that would take part at the finals in Japan and South Korea. He played in all four matches during the tournament, which ended in round-of-16 exit; in the decisive clash against co-hosts South Korea, he came close to scoring twice: first when Roma teammate Francesco Totti played him in only to have his shot blocked by Lee Woon-Jae. During extra time, referee Byron Moreno disallowed him a goal due to a controversial offside decision, and the Italians were eventually defeated by a golden goal.

Tommasi made his last appearance for Italy on 16 November 2003, in a 1–0 home victory over Romania. He scored the first of two goals for his country on 5 September 2001, in a 1–0 friendly win over Morocco.

== Style of play ==
A quick, strong, tenacious, consistent, hardworking and versatile player, Tommasi primarily excelled at breaking down his opponents' plays and intercepting passes as a box-to-box or defensive midfielder, due to his stamina and hard-tackling style of play. He also possessed good technique, movement, intelligence and was an accurate passer, which enabled him to retain possession and start attacking plays after winning back the ball; these attributes allowed him to play anywhere in midfield, rather than being confined to a single position, and he was often deployed on the right flank earlier on in his career, as well as in the centre, or even as an offensive-minded midfielder, or in the mezzala role, due to his eye for goal. In his youth, he also played as a central defender.

== Post-retirement ==
In January 2010, together with his agent Andrea Pretti and longtime friend Werner Seeber, Tommasi set up a company in China called Tommasi Pretti Seeber Sports Culture & Exchange Co., Ltd (TPS), aimed at creating a reliable bridge between Europe and the Asian country in the field of football.

On 9 May 2011, he became the president of the Italian Footballers' Association, succeeding historical founder Sergio Campana who had been in office for 43 years. He resigned from his role in 2020.

He took part to the 2024 sports documentary Bootay: Untold - The art of losing.

== Political career ==
In October 2021, it was announced Tommasi would run as the centre-left candidate for mayor of Verona for the 2022 election. After qualifying to the second round with around 40% of votes, on 26 June 2022 Tommasi won the runoff with over 54% of the vote over outgoing right-wing mayor Federico Sboarina in the traditionally right-wing city.

== Personal life ==
- Married to Chiara Pigozzi since 1996, Tommasi has six children: Beatrice, Camilla, Susanna, Samuele, Emanuele and Aurora.
- A philanthropist, he was heavily involved in charity work, and arranges for footballers' disciplinary fines to go to good causes.
- Tommasi first began his involvement with charitable organisations in 1994, when he chose to undertake civil service instead of military service, as he "did not want to serve his country by holding a rifle."
- For his charitable work, he received the "Altro-pallone" award in 2000.
- When first called up by the national side, Tommasi said he did not deserve the honour in that moment.

== Honours ==
Roma

- Serie A: 2000–01
- Supercoppa Italiana: 2001
- Coppa Italia: Runner-up 2002–03, 2005–06

Italy U21

- UEFA European Under-21 Championship: 1996

Individual

- Pallone d'Argento: 2000–01
- AS Roma Hall of Fame: 2015

Political offices
Preceded by Federico Sboarina	Mayor of Verona since 2022	Succeeded by Incumbent
