= Flavio Tosi =

Italian politician (born 1969)

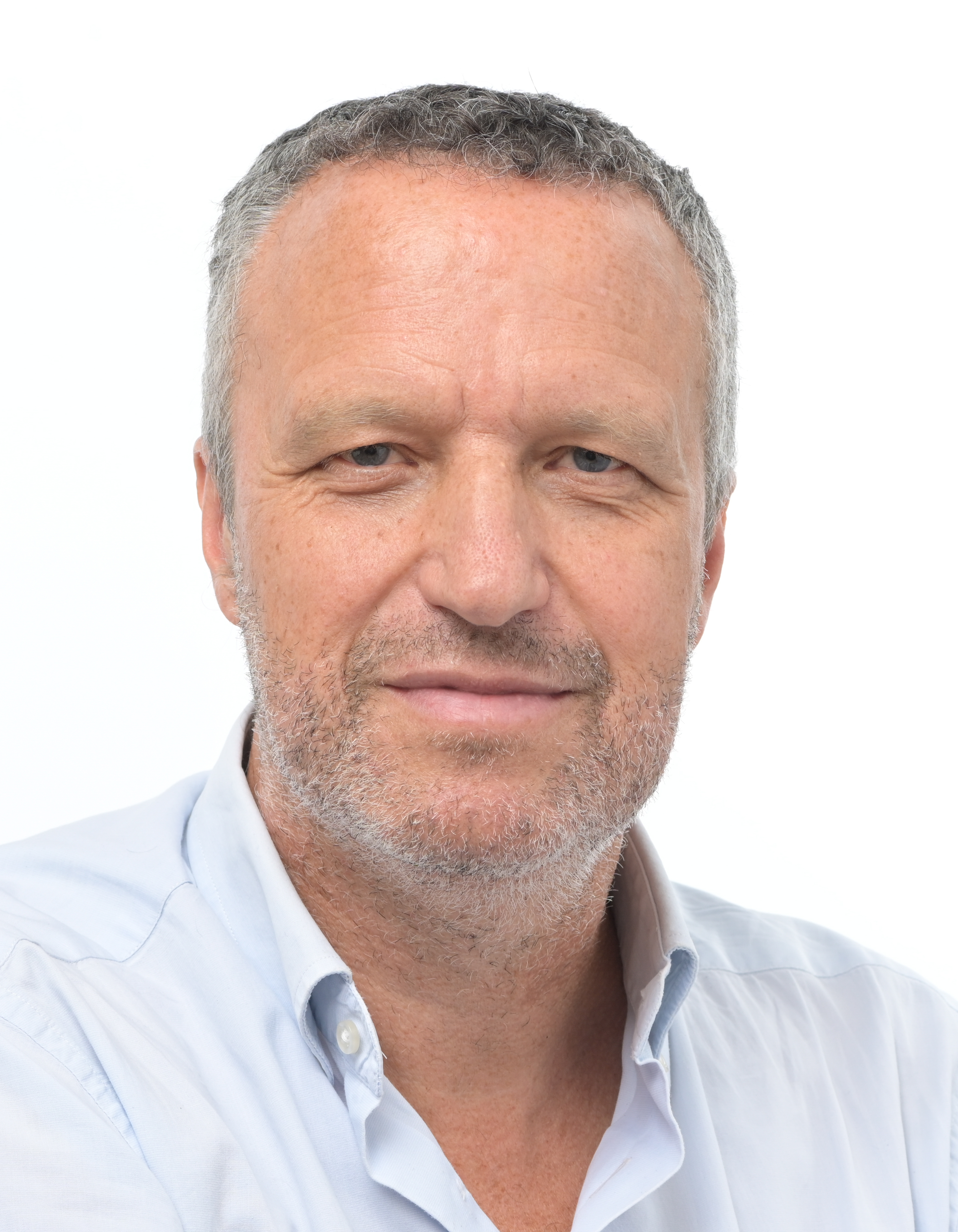

Mayor of Verona
- In office 28 May 2007 – 27 June 2017
- Preceded by: Paolo Zanotto
- Succeeded by: Federico Sboarina

Member of the Chamber of Deputies
- In office 13 October 2022 – 9 July 2024
- Constituency: Veneto 2

Member of the European Parliament
- Incumbent
- Assumed office 16 July 2024
- Constituency: North-East Italy
- In office 1 July 2014 – 8 July 2014
- Constituency: North-East Italy

Personal details
- Born: 18 June 1969 (age 57) Verona, Italy
- Party: Lega Nord (till 2015); Fare! (2015-2022); Forza Italia (since 2022)

Flavio Tosi (born 18 June 1969) is an Italian politician who served as the mayor of Verona from 2007 to 2017. He has been a long-time member of Liga Veneta–Lega Nord.

== Political career ==
Having joined Liga Veneta (LV) in 1991, Tosi was elected to the Municipal Council of Verona in 1994 at the age of 25. From 1997 to 2003 he was also provincial secretary of the LV in the Province of Verona. In the meantime, in the 2000 regional election he was elected to the Regional Council of Veneto, where he served as the party's floor leader for two years.

After being the most voted candidate in the 2005 regional election (more than 28,000 of personal votes), he was appointed regional minister of Health in Galan III Government. Aged 36, he was one of the LV's rising stars, alongside Luca Zaia, who was contextually appointed vice president and soon became his main rival within the party.

In late 2006 Tosi launched his bid for mayor of Verona. Initially he was supported only by his party, but then, thanks to his popularity in opinion polls, he was able to threw behind himself the whole centre-right coalition, including the LV, Forza Italia, National Alliance, the Union of Christian and Centre Democrats and minor parties. In May 2007 he was elected mayor of Verona by a large margin: 60.8% to 33.9% of the incumbent Paolo Zanotto. Verona was thus the second largest Italian city ever ruled by Lega Nord (LN), the first one being Milan, ruled by Marco Formentini from 1993 to 1997. Tosi was one of the most popular mayors in Italy with approval ratings around 65-75%.

In July 2008 the LV held its national congress in Padua. Tosi unsuccessfully tried to replace Gian Paolo Gobbo as national secretary, but was elected national president instead. Tosi appeared to be also the standard-bearer of the party in view of the 2010 regional election, along with Zaia. However, in December 2009 Tosi had to renounce his bid to become President of Veneto in favour of Zaia, who commanded a larger support in the party's national council.

In June 2012 Tosi, just re-elected mayor of Verona with 57.4% of the vote (three times his closest opponent Michele Bertucco, who got a mere 22.8%), was elected national secretary of the LV with 57% of the votes (236 delegates out of 414), while his challenger Massimo Bitonci had 43% (178 delegates). Tosi was the chairman of the board of directors of Autostrada Brescia Verona Vicenza Padova, a toll road operator, as well as a member of the board of its parent company A4 Holding.

In the 2014 European Parliament election Tosi was elected MEP with around 100,000 personal votes, only to step down a few months later.

In March 2015, after a long struggle with Zaia, backed by LN's federal secretary Matteo Salvini, was ejected from the party. Subsequently, in the 2015 regional election, he ran for President of Veneto, supported by the Tosi List for Veneto, coming fourth with 11.9% of the vote.

On 21 July 2015 Tosi founded his new party, called Act! (Fare!).

In 2022, Tosi ran again for a third term for the Mayor of Verona in an attempt to succeed his successor, Federico Sboarina, who had refused to include the center-right party Forza Italia in his coalition. He ran as part of a center-right coalition composed of F! and FI, also including members of Italia Viva. However, he came third (23.86%) behind center-left candidate Damiano Tommasi (39.8%) and incumbent Sboarina (32.7%), and thus did not proceed to second round, which was won by Tommasi. Following that, he ran in the 2022 Italian Parliamentary elections, and was elected as part of party list from the plurinominal Veneto 2-P03 constituency, consisting of Verona area.

In 2024, Tosi was included on the Forza Italia's European Parliament list in North East Italy. However, in the constituency, he received only 34 450 preference votes, coming second after party leader Antonio Tajani and was not elected. However, when Tajani chose not to take his seat, Tosi took the seat instead and resigned his parliamentary mandate.

== Legal troubles ==
On 2 December 2004 Tosi was found guilty of instigation to racism according to the Mancino law, for having collected signatures against the establishment of new gypsy camps in Verona. Later, on 30 January 2007, the Court of Appeal found Tosi not guilty for the above offence, while at the same time finding him guilty of a minor offence (promoting a hatred campaign). On 13 December 2007 the Court of Cassation cancelled the latter sentence and ruled that the a new appeal must take place. In June 2008 the Court of Cassation publicized the motivations of its December 2007 sentence, stating that Tosi was not guilty of promoting ideas of racial superiority or hatred and that it is acceptable to discriminate against Roma on the grounds that they are thieves, indicating that the Court of Appeals should not consider as crime political initiatives aimed at illegal acts of minority members. On 20 October 2008 the Appeals' Court of Venice upheld the conviction of Tosi to two months of imprisonment with suspended sentence. The Court has given sixty days for filing the motivation. Tosi has announced its intention to appeal to the Court of Cassation. On 11 July 2009 that Court definitively sentence Tosi to two months of imprisonment with suspended sentence, In October 2009 Tosi was sentenced by the Court of Cassation to a sanction of 4,000 euro and to the suspension for three years from holding public rallies. something which did not impede him to be re-elected mayor of Verona in May 2012.
