= Luca Zaia =

Italian politician

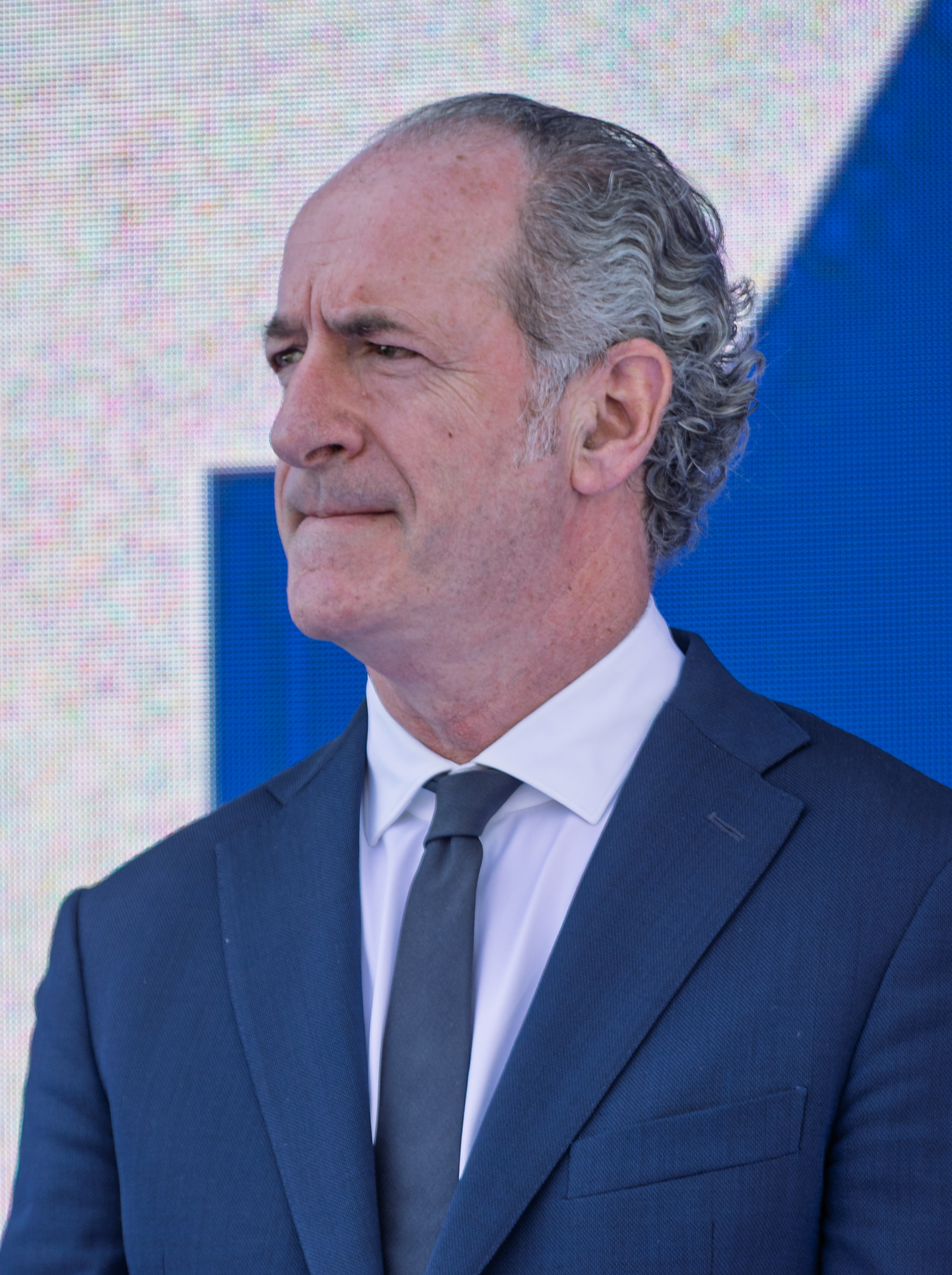

President of the Regional Council of Veneto
- Incumbent
- Assumed office 15 December 2025
- Preceded by: Roberto Ciambetti

President of Veneto
- In office 10 April 2010 – 5 December 2025
- Preceded by: Giancarlo Galan
- Succeeded by: Alberto Stefani

Minister of Agriculture
- In office 8 May 2008 – 16 April 2010
- Prime Minister: Silvio Berlusconi
- Preceded by: Paolo De Castro
- Succeeded by: Giancarlo Galan

Vice president of Veneto
- In office 19 May 2005 – 6 June 2008
- President: Giancarlo Galan
- Preceded by: Fabio Gava
- Succeeded by: Franco Manzato

President of the Province of Treviso
- In office 10 June 1998 – 9 May 2005
- Preceded by: Giovanni Mazzonetto
- Succeeded by: Leonardo Muraro

Personal details
- Born: 27 March 1968 (age 58) Conegliano, Italy
- Party: Liga Veneta
- Spouse: Raffaella Monti (m. 1998)
- Education: University of Udine
- Website: Official website

Luca Zaia (born 27 March 1968) is an Italian politician, who was President of Veneto from 2010 to 2025. He often rose to prominence for his positions contrasting the lines of his own party, including support of initiatives to tackle climate change, his support of gender-affirming surgery, and push for the recognition of transgender people to identify with their preferred sex, advocacy against homophobia and antisemitism, and his views on immigration with his model of "integrazione diffusa" (a redistributive framework where immigrants' quota are spread across municipalities) of migrants coming to Europe.

Prior to that, Zaia was President of the Province of Treviso from 1998 to 2005, Vice President of Veneto from 2005 to 2008 and Minister of Agriculture in Silvio Berlusconi's fourth cabinet from 2008 to 2010.

== Early life ==
Son of Giuseppe and Carmela Lisetto, after graduating from the Oenological School of Conegliano, he graduated in Animal Production Sciences at the Faculty of Agriculture of the University of Udine. After starting with the graduation party organized by him, for twelve years he worked as a PR for various discos in his area such as the "Manhattan" of Godega di Sant'Urbano, the "Diamantik" of Gaiarine, the "Kolossal" of Spresiano or the "Desiree" in Caorle, in addition to various other jobs, including "the waiter, the cleaner, the bricklayer, the private chemistry teacher, the horse riding instructor, the worker in a leather company.

He has been married since 1999 to Raffaella Monti, a company secretary; the couple has no children.

== Political career ==
Luca Zaia joined Liga Veneta–Lega Nord in the early 1990s, after having met Gian Paolo Gobbo, and was first elected to public office in 1993, when he became municipal councillor of Godega di Sant'Urbano. Two years later, in 1995, he successfully ran for provincial councillor and, after the election, was appointed provincial minister of Agriculture.

In the 1998 provincial election, Zaia was elected President of the Province of Treviso with 60.0% of the vote in the second round, after arriving ahead in the first round with 41.4% and refusing to accept the support of any other party other than his own. At the time, he was the youngest provincial president of Italy. In 2002 he was re-elected with a landslide 68.9% of the vote in the second round and continued to govern the province with the sole support of his party.

In May 2005, Zaia was appointed Vice President of Veneto and regional minister of Agriculture and Tourism in Giancarlo Galan's third government, but left in May 2008 in order to take office as federal minister of agriculture in Berlusconi IV Cabinet.

In December 2009, The People of Freedom (PdL) determined that the coalition candidate in the 2010 regional election would be a member of Lega Nord. Subsequently, the national council of Liga Veneta (LV) nominated Zaia for president of the region.

== President of Veneto ==
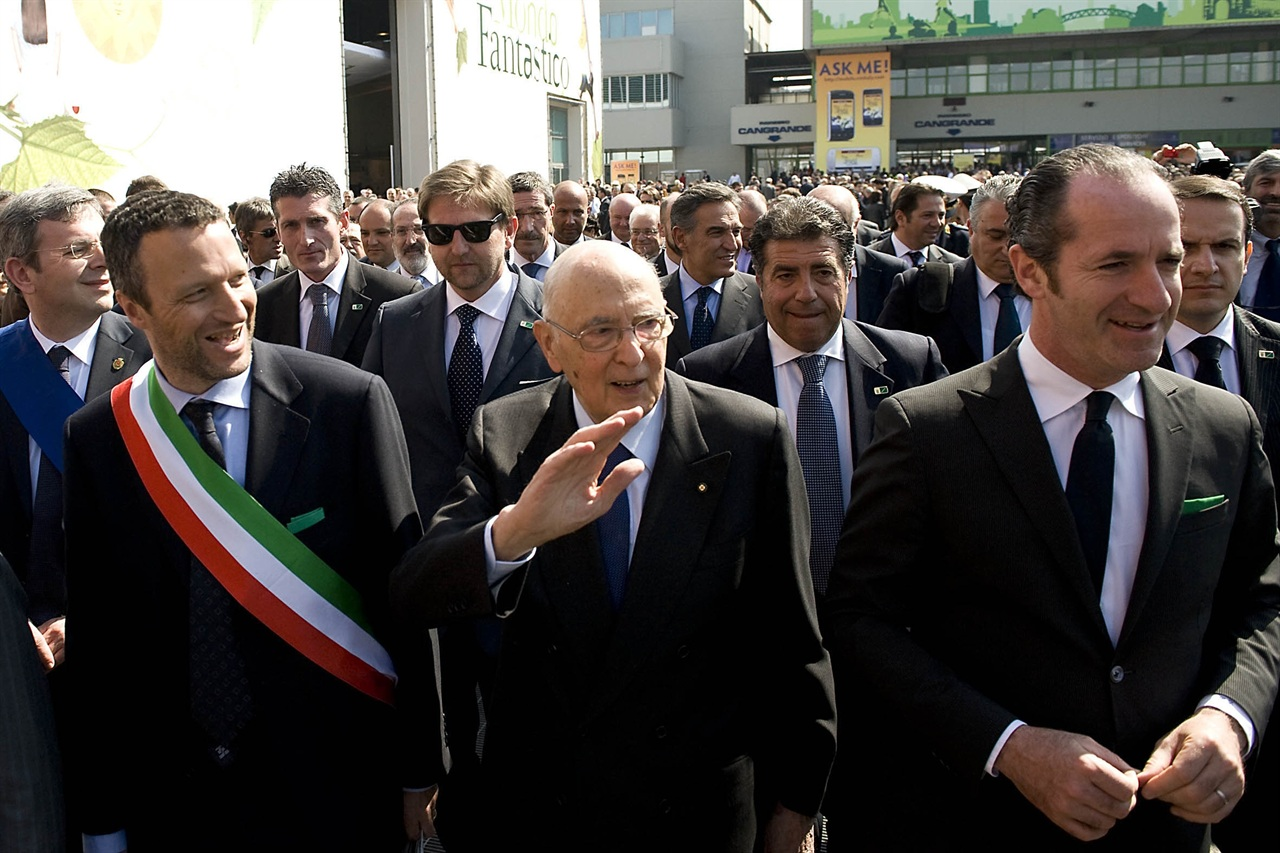
Zaia with Giorgio Napolitano and Flavio Tosi in Verona

In the 2010 regional election Zaia was elected President of Veneto by winning 60.2% of the vote.

In the 2015 regional election Zaia was re-elected President of Veneto with 50.1%, despite the split occurred in his party when Flavio Tosi, who later won 11.9% of the vote, left in order to form the Tosi List for Veneto.

In the 2020 regional election Zaia was re-elected for a third consecutive term with 76.8% of the vote, becoming the most voted regional president ever in Italy. Additionally, Zaia's personal list won 44.6% of the vote, while the party's official list won 16.9%.

=== Social issues ===
In early times of his administration, Zaia tried to limit the RU-486 abortive pill. However, the Italian Medicines Agency declared that his position was unconstitutional in view of how the question is regulated by the Law 194 of 1978.

In 2013 Zaia spoke against the LGBT adoption, saying: "I have nothing against gays, but the possibility of adoption seems to me to be an extreme measure with unpredictable effects." However he has since reneged on his views and even stated that "Freedom must be guaranteed to all and there is no room for homophobia and racism." in 2021 and that "Homosexuality is not an illness, but homophobia is." later in 2022. That same year following the suicide of transgender teacher Cloe Bianco in Marcon, Zaia stated that "for me Cloe was a woman for all intents and purposes." showing support for transgender people

Zaia liberalised artificial insemination for women up to 50 years.

=== Economic issues ===
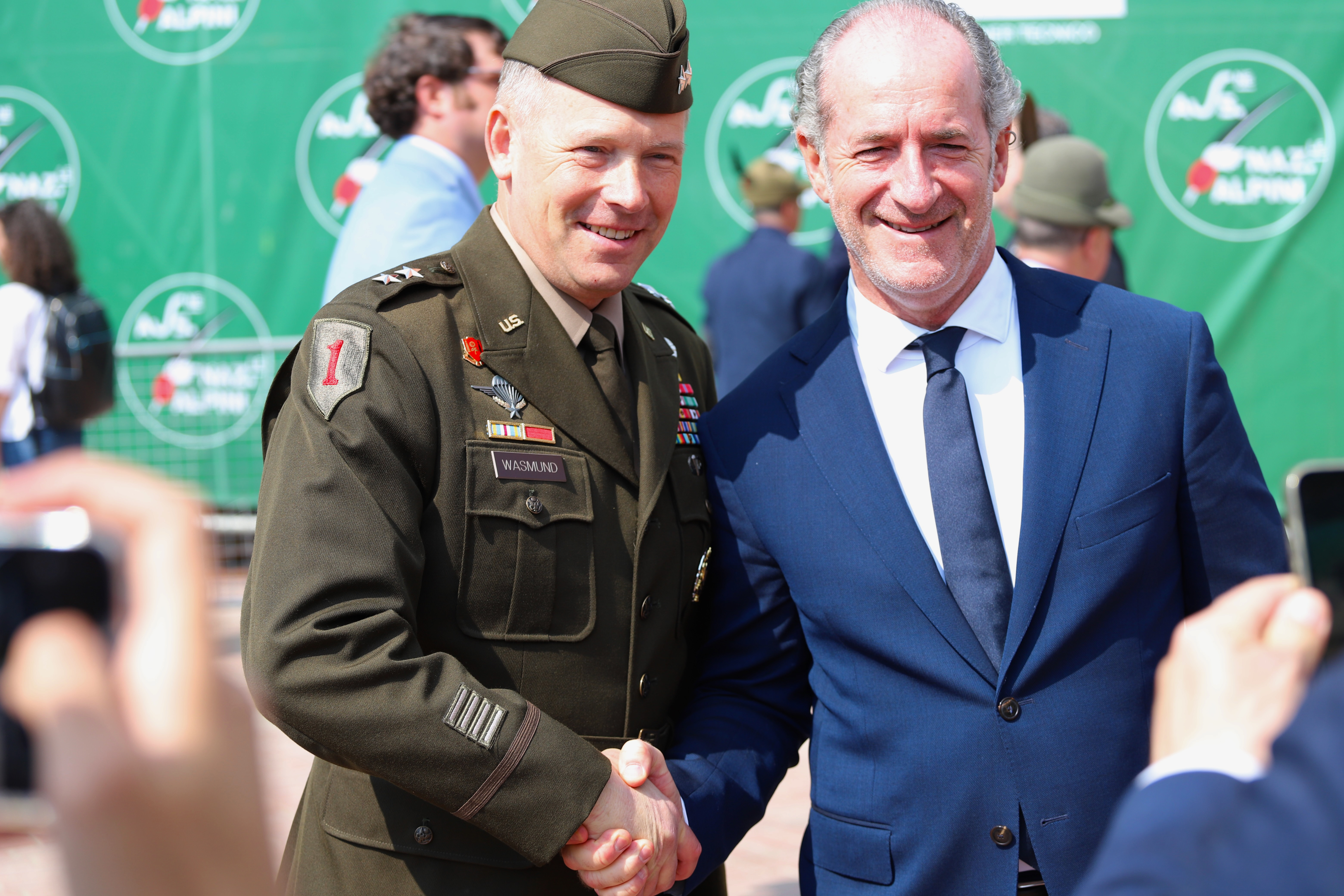
Zaia with Gen. Todd Wasmund.

In August 2010, an anti-globalization group demonstrated in Vivaro against the planting of genetically modified organisms. The demonstration was supported by Zaia, who demanded a "return to legality", even though his predecessor Giancarlo Galan, a member of his coalition, was in favour of GMOs.

After a flood in 2010, Zaia and his coalition changed a regional law to permit the reconstruction of rural ruins up to 800 cubic metres. The Democratic Party claimed that this was an attempt at "cementification". The National Association of Building Constructors (ANCE) also called the law a "bad choice".

Zaia was criticized when, after the flood, he asked for more funds for the reconstruction, saying, "It's a shame spending €250,000,000 for four stones in Pompei."

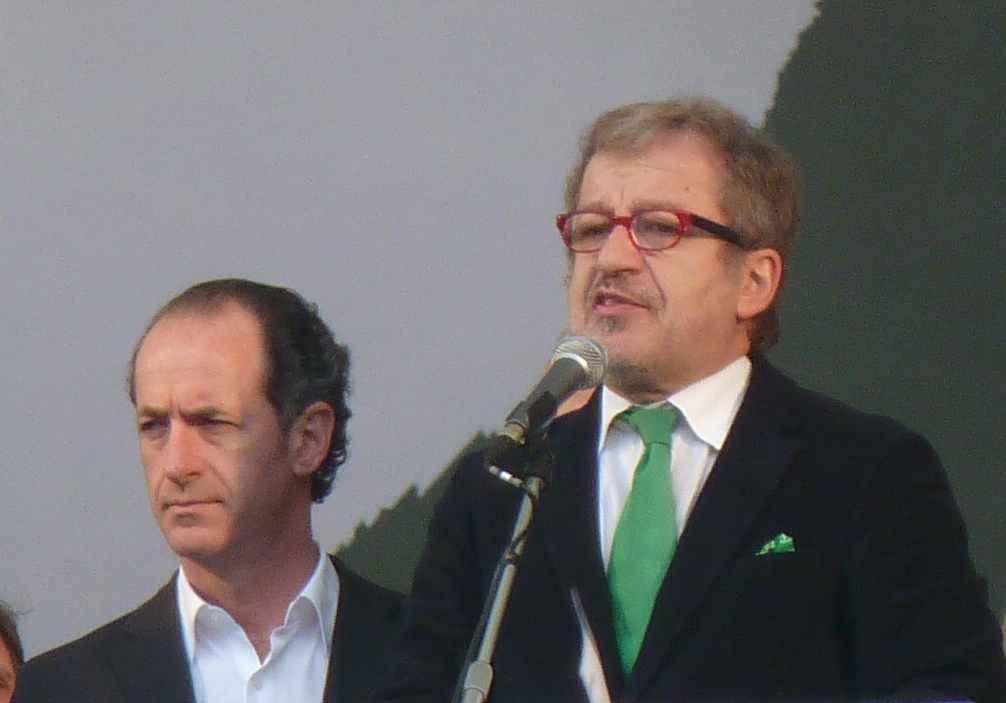
Zaia and Maroni at the Pontida rally

=== Venetian independence ===
Zaia announced that he too had voted (yes) in the unofficial, non-binding, online and privately organised 2014 Venetian independence referendum and explained that he would seek "total independence" for Veneto. Zaia has compared the status of the Veneto within Italy to that of Crimea within Ukraine.

=== Venetian autonomy ===
Zaia was a strong proponent of and oversaw the 2017 Venetian autonomy referendum, in which turnout was 57.2% and 98.1% of participants voted "yes".

=== Covid-19 outbreak ===
In February 2020 Zaia apologized after criticizing China over the COVID-19 pandemic and claiming that Chinese people "eat live mice". Zaia has anyway emerged strengthened from the crisis, widely praised for keeping hospital admissions down.

=== Miscellaneous ===
In the occasion of the 2011 referendums on four questions concerning the repeal of recent laws regarding the privatisation of water services (two questions), a return to the nuclear energy which had been phased out after the 1987 referendum, and criminal procedure, specifically a provision exempting the Prime Minister and the Ministers from appearing in court, he voted "4 Yes". He called for more transparency and demanded more citizens' supervision of public administration.

== See also ==
- Regional Governments led by Luca Zaia:
  - First Zaia government
  - Second Zaia government
  - Third Zaia government
