= Venetian nationalism =

Regional political movement in Italy

Flag of the Republic of Venice

War flag of the Republic of Venice

Flag of Veneto

Venetian nationalism, also Venetism or Venetianism, from the Venetian/Italian name, venetismo, is a nationalist, but primarily regionalist, political movement active mostly in Veneto, Italy, as well as in other parts of the former Republic of Venice. The term Venetismo was likely coined by Guido Piovene, who wrote that it was "a powerful reality of the imagination" for Venetians, who hold "a fantastic conviction that their land is a world".

Generally speaking, Venetists promote the distinct Venetian identity and the rediscovery of the Republic of Venice's heritage, traditions, culture, and language, and/or demand more autonomy or even independence for Veneto from Italy. According to journalist Paolo Possamai, Venetism is "the strain of Veneto and Venetians toward the recognition of their identity and autonomy". Venetism is a broad movement, which includes Venetist parties, notably Liga Veneta, but also encompasses people from other political parties. In 1982 Goffredo Parise, a writer and journalist, wrote: "Veneto is my fatherland. [...] Even if a Republic of Italy exists, this abstract idea is not my Fatherland [...]. We Venetians have travelled throughout the world, but our Fatherland, that for which we would fight if it were necessary to fight, is Veneto. [...] When I see "River sacred to the Fatherland" written on the bridges spanning the Piave, I am moved, not because I think of Italy, but rather because I think of Veneto."

Most Venetists consider Veneto a nation distinct from Italy and some refuse the validity of the result of the referendum through which Veneto (or, better, Venetia) was united with Italy in 1866. Some of them have long proposed a re-edition of that referendum and campaign for the independence of Venetia, a country that would be composed of the territories of the historical Venetian Republic, covering Veneto, Friuli-Venezia Giulia, and large chunks of Lombardy (the province of Brescia, the province of Bergamo, the area around Crema, and part of the province of Mantua). The proposal, regarding to Veneto alone, has more recently gained the support of Liga Veneta, the Government of Veneto, and the majority of the Regional Council of Veneto, which endorsed a bill aimed at organising the referendum in 2014. The Constitutional Court ruled that referendum out as contrary to the Constitution, but authorised an autonomy referendum, which took place on 22 October 2017: 57.2% of Venetians participated in the referendum and 98.1% voted "yes". Consequently, President of Veneto Luca Zaia started a negotiation with the Italian government.

Although it usually refers to the whole Venetian autonomist movement, the term "Venetism" is sometimes used to identify specifically culture-oriented Venetists, hardline Venetists or those Venetists who refuse the concept of Padania, a proposed country by Lega Nord / Lega, of which Liga Veneta (the most successful Venetist party so far) has been the "national/regional" section in Veneto. Alberto Gardin, a pro-independence publisher and later self proclaimed 121st Doge who supports the boycott of Italian elections, offers another interpretation by considering "Venetism" a "partisan concept, that is part of the Italian political system (Venetists, as Socialists, Communists, PD, PdL, etc.)".

== Background and history ==
=== Annexation of Veneto by Italy ===
The Venetian Republic existed for 1100 years, from 697 to 1797 (submitted to Byzantium until the 9th century), and was one of the world's first modern republics. After defeating the Republic of Genoa in a series of wars, it became the most powerful Mediterranean maritime power, and at its height extended its rule from large parts of the Po Valley to the coastal regions and islands of present-day Slovenia, Croatia, Bosnia and Herzegovina, Montenegro, Albania, and Greece. Venice was a leading power of the Western world in the 15th and 16th centuries. In 1797, after a long decline, through the Treaty of Campo Formio, Napoleon traded what remained of the Republic with Austria in exchange for other territories. In 1848, Venetians, led by Daniele Manin, rebelled against Austrian rule and established the Republic of San Marco. Manin, who opposed the proposed unification by some Venetians with the Kingdom of Sardinia, resigned, but returned to lead the opposition against Vienna in 1849.

Venetian territories with the former Duchy of Mantua and Friuli were annexed to Italy in 1866, five years after Italian unification and the creation of the Kingdom of Italy under the House of Savoy in 1861. Veneto's unification with Italy resulted from the Austro-Prussian War, won by the Prussians, Italy's allies. In the Italian unification process, the conflict is known as Third War of Independence. Austria lost Venetia, ceded to Napoleon III of France, who in turn ceded it to Italy. Austria refused to give Venetian territories directly to Italy because the Austrians had crushed the Italians during the war, defeating them on land during the Battle of Custoza (24 June) and on sea during the Battle of Lissa (20 July). Giuseppe Garibaldi's Hunters of the Alps had some success against the Austrians at the Battle of Bezzecca (21 July), but the Italian government ordered Garibaldi to withdraw when Prussia and Austria concluded an armistice. With the Peace of Prague (23 August), Austria agreed to Venetia's incorporation into the Kingdom of Italy. The same point was repeated in the Treaty of Vienna (12 October), achieved with the mediation of France.

Austria first ceded the Venetian territory to France (under a treaty signed by General Karl Moering, on behalf of Franz Joseph I of Austria, and General Edmond Le Bœuf, on behalf of Napoleon III) as a compensation for French neutrality during the war. According to the treaty, France ceded Venetia to Italy "under the reservation of the consent of the people duly consulted". Whether an option other than becoming Italian was available is unclear, nor was the treaty precise on how to consult the people. Venetia was already under Italian control after the French government renounced it on 19 October.

This increases doubt about the real importance of the plebiscite, and leading historians suggest that the referendum in Venetia was held under military pressure, as a mere 0.01% of voters (69 out of more than 642,000 ballots) voted against annexation and a mere 0.1% (567 ballots) were null, and that it was ultimately rigged. Some historians, who investigated into the historical archive of the Austrian foreign ministry, also suggest that the referendum was a mere administrative affair to Italy, just to formalise the sovereignty on a territory already under its possession, and that the local population had no real choice. The plebiscite could have been a mere demonstration to gain legitimacy after Italy's bad conduct during the so-called Third War of Independence.

The Kingdom of Italy adopted Italian as the official language. Venetians, like several other regional communities, largely rejected that and continued to use the Venetian language. Linguistic nationalism became part of Venetian culture, and during the last decades of the 19th century, some revolts against southern Italian bureaucrats occurred. After its incorporation into Italy, Venetia was so poor that millions of Venetians had to emigrate to the Americas, especially Brazil and Argentina (three million left their homeland from 1870 and 1910), without losing their heritage, so even today, many Venetian descendants in Latin America, most notably in two Brazilian southern states, Rio Grande do Sul and Santa Catarina, speak Venetian as their mother tongue.

=== World Wars and the Italian Republic ===
Right after World War I, the economic and political situation in Veneto was critical, so that a former Prime Minister and native of Venice, Luigi Luzzatti, wrote to Prime Minister Vittorio Emanuele Orlando and told him there could be a "Venetian Ireland", in parallel to the simultaneous Irish War of Independence, while the prefect of Treviso signalled the risk that a separatist movement aimed at separating Veneto from Italy might flourish in the province of Treviso.

Precursors of the present-day Venetist movement date back to before World War II and were both left- and right-wing. In 1920 La Riscossa, a Venetian newspaper close to the Socialists and the Republicans, espoused the need for a "united elective governorate with autonomous and competent technical and administrative organs" as an alternative to the "central political rule" Guido Bergamo, a Republican member of the Chamber of Deputies elected in Veneto, wrote that "the Venetian problem is so acute that from today on we will preach the rebellion of Venetians. Citizens, let's not pay taxes, not recognise the central government in Rome, chase away prefects, retain the money from direct taxes in Veneto". Shortly after Italico Corradino Cappellotto, a member of the Chamber of Deputies for the Italian People's Party, launched the first Venetist party forth of the 1921 general election: the Lion of Saint Mark won 6.1% of the votes in the province of Treviso.

After the takeover of Benito Mussolini, who among other things proposed to eradicate the local languages in favour of Italian language widespread, the rise of Fascism, World War II, and the birth of the Italian Republic, Venetist ideas lost ground, in an era in which the "myth of the indivisibility and the unity" of the country was strong even in Veneto. However, the campaign of Mussolini to eradicate regional languages was largely unsuccessful in the region, which soon became a stronghold of the Christian Democracy (DC) party due to the leading role of the Catholic Church in the region. In the 1948 general election Christian Democrats won 60.5% of the vote in Veneto.

Since 1919, Venetia plus the newly annexed territories from Austria, which included Trentino and South Tyrol, were called the Three Venices (Tre Venezie, whereof Triveneto), meaning Venezia Euganea (Veneto plus large chunks of Friuli), Venezia Giulia (the eastern part of current Friuli-Venezia Giulia) and Venezia Tridentina (Trentino and South Tyrol). However, under the Constitution of Italy adopted in 1948, only Trentino-Alto Adige/Südtirol and Friuli-Venezia Giulia were granted of the status of special-statute autonomous region and the connected special privileges, mainly including fiscal autonomy. Hence, the proposals by some groups of unifying Veneto with the two regions cited above (or with Trentino alone) or giving also Veneto an autonomous statute.

=== Comeback of Venetist ideas ===
Venetist ideas made a comeback in the 1960s, when the Venetian Regionalist Autonomous Movement (MARV) campaigned for the institution of the ordinary regions (including Veneto), prefigured by the Italian Constitution. The ordinary regions were finally instituted in 1970.

Since the 1970s, Veneto experienced a dramatic economic boom due to a new production model based on small enterprises. The high burden of taxes and bureaucracy, associated with the increasing frustration with the inefficient and overstaffed Italian government in Rome, that continued to channel northern taxes as massive development aid to the corrupt and backward southern regions, was the key element, along with linguistic and historical claims, that led to the formation of Liga Veneta (LV) in January 1980. The opening speech of the first congress of the party in December 1979 recited: "Today for Venetians the moment has come, after 113 years of Italian unitary colonisation, to take their natural and human resources back, to fight against the wild exploitation that has brought emigration, pollution, and rooting out from their culture". European integration through the European Union (EU) was seen as an opportunity to give back to Veneto its autonomy.

One of the regional leaders of Christian Democracy (DC), Antonio Bisaglia, early understood Veneto's demand of more autonomy and that his party, the dominant force in Venetian politics since 1946, would have been the main victim of the rise of LV as both parties competed for the support of the middle class. He thus proposed the evolution of the DC into a regional party on the model of the Christian Social Union in Bavaria. In 1982, Bisaglia tellingly declared, "Veneto would be mature for a federalist state, but this state, centralist and bureaucratic [as it is], will never concede autonomy to my region". Opposition from Rome and Bisaglia's sudden death in 1984 stopped the plan of a regional DC on the "Bavarian model". Giancarlo Galan, regional leader of Forza Italia and President of Veneto from 1995 to 2010, made a similar proposal in 2008, taking example mainly from the South Tyrolean People's Party, but his "Forza Veneto" remained just an idea.

The LV, whose leader in the 1980s and early 1990s was Franco Rocchetta, made its main electoral debut in the 1983 general election, when it garnered 4.3% in Veneto, resulting in two elects to the Italian Parliament. The party suffered many splits in its first decade of life and became a large political force only after its federation with other regional leagues, notably including Umberto Bossi's Lega Lombarda, which resulted in Lega Nord (LN) in 1991: in the 1996 general election, the party was Veneto's largest with 29.3%. However, clashes between Bossi and hardcore Venetists led to several splits; in 1994, Rocchetta left in protest, but more damaging was the 1998 split led by Fabrizio Comencini and Alessio Morosin, who launched Liga Veneta Repubblica (LVR). As a result, in the 2001 general election, the LV garnered a mere 10.2% of the vote, its worst score since 1987, while the LVR gained 4.9%. As the latter faded, the LV returned to gain ground in the 2005 regional election, despite the meteoric success of North-East Project (PNE). More recently, a string of separatist parties, notably including Venetian Independence (IV), emerged.

Both in 1992 and 2000 the Italian Constitutional Court rejected proposals for an autonomy referendum, brought forward by the Regional Council of Veneto.

In the 2010 regional election the LV, in steady rise since 2001, was by far the largest party in the region with 35.2% of the vote, while its leader Luca Zaia was elected President of Veneto by a landslide 60.2%. The combined result of Venetist parties was 37.6%, the highest so far.

In the 2015 regional election, the LV set another record by winning 40.9% of the vote (combined result of party list, 17.8%, and Zaia's personal list, 23.1%) and Zaia was re-elected President of Veneto with 50.1% of the vote and a more coherently Venetist coalition. Separatist parties (Venetian Independence, Independence We Veneto and Veneto Confederal State) obtained 5.4% of the vote, while other regionalist and/or Venetist parties (Tosi List for Veneto, LTV's sponsored Il Veneto del Fare list, North-East Union, and Autonomous Veneto Project) another 8.0% of the vote. Consequently, a majority of regional councillors adhered, at least to some extent, to Venetism.

In the 2020 regional election, the LV set one more record by winning 61.5% of the vote (combined result of party list, 16.9%, and Zaia's personal list, 44.6%) and Zaia was re-elected President by a landslide 76.8% of the vote, more than any other candidate in any other region of Italy. Minor Venetist lists and parties (Venetian Autonomy List — sponsored by the LV and including Liga Veneta Repubblica —, the Party of Venetians, Venetian Left and Veneto for the Autonomies) obtained a further 4.1% of the vote. As a result, 34 out of 51 seats in the Regional Council were controlled by Venetists, 33 by LV members.

In the 2025 regional election, LV's Alberto Stefani was elected to succeed to Zaia, by garnering 64.4% of the vote. The LV, which fielded only one list, was still the largest party with 36.3% of the vote. Other two Venetist parties, Resist Veneto and Liga Veneta Repubblica, which obtained 5.0% and 1.8%, respectively, won representation.

== Recent developments ==
=== 2012–2015 opinion polls on independence ===
While support for a federal system, as opposed to a centrally administered state, receives widespread consensus in Veneto, support for independence is less favoured. Recent polls show a rise of independentism. According to an opinion poll made in December 2011, 50% of Venetians support the independence of Veneto. More strikingly, an opinion poll published on Il Gazzettino in January 2012 put those favoring independence at 53.3% (with the support from foreign-born Venetians at 55.0%). According to the same pollster, the support for independence rose to 56.7% in January 2013.

According to a February 2014 poll by Ixè, in a hypothetical referendum on independence, 47% of Venetians would vote yes and 26% no. According to a March 2014 poll by Ilvo Diamanti's Demos&Pi, 55% of Venetians favoured independence, 39% opposed it and the remaining 6% did not answer. According to a similar poll conducted by Istituto Piepoli, 64% of Venetians would vote in favour of more autonomy with 19% against, and 51% would vote for independence with 32% against. According to a Demos&Pi poll taken in October 2014, 53% of Venetians favoured independence, thus making Veneto the most separatist region in Italy, followed by Sardinia (45%) and Sicily (44%). In March 2015 Demos&Pi found that 57% of Venetians (including 83% of Liga Veneta–Lega Nord's voters) favoured independence.

=== Resolution 44/2012 on self-determination ===
In 2012 Venetian Independence (IV), notably including Lodovico Pizzati, Gianluca Busato and Alessio Morosin, collected more than 20,000 signatures in support for a referendum on independence and presented them to President Luca Zaia. Zaia informed the Regional Council and its President Clodovaldo Ruffato asked an opinion to the legal office, which explained that such a referendum was not legal under the Constitution of Italy. On 6 October IV organised a march in Venice, during which it proposed a resolution (44/2012) for a consultative referendum on independence to be approved by the Regional Council: the text of the resolution was given to Giovanni Furlanetto, LV regional councillor, who supported the proposition. Another Council member, Mariangelo Foggiato of North-East Union (UNE), officially presented the resolution in the Council. On 17 October a total of 42 regional councillors out of 60 officially asked a discussion on the issue.

On 28 November the Council approved the resolution, in which "independence" was replaced by "self-determination", with 29 votes in favour, 2 against and 5 abstentions. Those in favour included Foggiato, LV's entire group, most councillors of The People of Freedom, Pietrangelo Pettenò of the Communist Refoundation Party–Federation of the Left, Diego Bottacin of Toward North and independent councillor Sandro Sandri, who had expounded the resolution at the start of the session, while the entire group of the Democratic Party left the floor in protest, but proclaimed their support for a special statute for Veneto. The document required Zaia and Ruffato to urgently open talks with the European Union (EU) and the United Nations in order to come up with a referendum proposal that will establish the will of the Venetian people on its self-determination. To achieve this goal, the two Presidents would have benefited from the help of a special commission of jurists.

=== Petition to the EU and international support ===
On 10 January 2013 a delegation of IV submitted to the European Commission in Brussels a petition, signed by 50,000 European citizens, mainly Venetians, to endorse the referendum on self-determination. The collection of signatures for the petition was also supported by Domà Nunch in Lombardy. According to IV leaders, the EU should support the referendum and guarantee its result, a notion which was contradicted by the attitudes of EU institutions toward the 2014 Scottish referendum.

In March an appeal by international academics in support of resolution 44 was issued. The declaration, promoted by Marco Bassani, was signed by Frank Van Dun, Hans-Hermann Hoppe, Donald Livingston, Ralph Raico, Xavier Sala-i-Martin, and Pascal Salin, along with Paolo Bernardini, Carlo Lottieri and Alessandro Vitale. According to the appeal, "the self-determination process" of Veneto "will be an important step toward a better Europe and men of goodwill have to do everything possible to ensure that the electoral process leading to the independence referendum takes place without tension and with respect for all the people involved". In Lombardy Bassani, Lottieri and several intellectuals around L'Indipendenza newspaper formed the Lombard Committee for Resolution 44.

=== Further steps toward a referendum ===
After a hunger strike by two members of IV, in March 2013 Zaia and Ruffato implemented the first step mandated by resolution 44 by appointing the special commission of jurists who would examine the referendum issue. The commission was composed of six experts, including IV's Luca Azzano Cantarutti.

On 2 April Stefano Valdegamberi, floor leader of the Union of the Centre, who had abstained on Resolution 44 in November 2012, introduced a bill (342/2013) in order to call a referendum on independence by the end of the year. By 7 June the bill was endorsed by more than 15 regional councillors, sufficient to convene a special session of the Council on the issue. The Council discussed it on 30 July and 17 September, but in both cases no decision was taken.

On 5 April Castellavazzo, Belluno (mayor: Franco Roccon, The People of Freedom) was the first municipality to pass a motion in support of bill 342. Since then, more than 180 comuni (out of 581), led by mayors of different parties and representing about 1,800,000 Venetians (out of approximately 4,860,000), expressed their support for it; they notably include Verona, Rovigo, Bassano del Grappa, Castelfranco Veneto, Vittorio Veneto, Arzignano, Legnago, Montebelluna, Jesolo, Montecchio Maggiore, Oderzo and Cittadella. Among provinces, Padua, Verona, Treviso and Venice, for a total of about 3,510,000 inhabitants, endorsed the bill.

In February 2014 Liga Veneta–Lega Nord launched its own campaign for a referendum on independence.

On 1 April 2014 a committee of the Regional Council put forward bills calling for a referendum on independence and on more autonomy for the region. The move was supported by the representatives of Liga Veneta, Forza Italia (the minority faction), New Centre-Right, Popular Future, Union of the Centre and North-East Union, with the opposition of the Democratic Party, Italy of Values and the Federation of the Left. The day after, all the floor leaders of the parties (but the federation of the left) represented in the council officially asked the Italian government to give Veneto the status of a special-statute autonomous region and fiscal autonomy. The final document was approved by Liga Veneta, Forza Italia (both fations), New Centre Right, Union of the Centre, Italy of Values and North-East Union.

On 10 June the Regional Council discussed and passed a law concerning five referendum questions concerning special autonomy. On 12 June the same legislative assembly passed Valdegamberi's bill 342/2013 in order to hold a referendum on the independence (question: "Do you want Veneto to become a sovereign and independent republic?") with 30 yeas, 12 nays and 3 abstentions. A year later the Constitutional Court ruled the independence referendum out as contrary to the Constitution, but authorised one of the five autonomy referendums ("Do you want the Region of Veneto to be granted of further forms and special conditions of autonomy?"). The event was unique as the Court had previously rejected proposals for similar referendums brought forward by the Regional Council of Veneto.

=== Online referendum on independence ===
Plebiscite 2013 (P2013), a non-partisan committee organised Plebiscito.eu, an online independence referendum, with no official recognition, for 16–21 March. P2013 had been launched by a group of splinters from IV, led by Lodovico Pizzati and Gianluca Busato, in July 2013.

According to Plebiscito.eu's staff, 2.36 million Venetians (63.2% of all eligible voters) participated in the online referendum and 89.1% of them (that is to say 56.6% of all eligible voters) voted yes. This was enough for P2013 to proclaim Veneto's independence from Italy in Treviso on the night of 21 March. Voters approved also the adoption of the Euro (51.4% yes), EU membership (55.7% yes) and NATO membership (64.5% yes).

The event was covered by several international media. During an interview with foreign journalists on 19 March, President Zaia announced that he too had voted (yes) in the poll, promised that he would bring bill 342 again to the discussion of the Regional Council and explained that he would seek "total independence" for Veneto.

On 28 April, during a visit in Veneto, Minister of Interior Angelino Alfano acknowledged that "there is a Venetian question, which will be central in the government's relation with regions". In reference to what he called "Agenda Veneto", he said: "We think that Veneto could be the laboratory for a form of strong and advanced federalism. [...] We cannot close our eyes in front of independentist risings. [...] The answer is dual: enhancing autonomy and improving the government's services". For his part, Zaia explained to Alfano the "legitimate request of Venetians" for autonomy and independence, and that "the issue of autonomy and the desire of independence of Venetians cannot be resolved with an aspirin", concluding that "if Rome continues to sleep, it is inevitable that Veneto will organise by itself".

=== Autonomy referendum and negotiation ===
In March 2016 President Zaia announced that he had written to Prime Minister Matteo Renzi in order to start the negotiation both on the organisation of the referendum on autonomy and the devolution of further powers to Veneto according to article 116 of the Constitution. Zaia proposed the referendum to be held on the very same day of the 2016 constitutional referendum (which would reduce the regions' powers—article 117, while expanding the powers that can be devolved to regions according to article 116 and creating a regionalised Senate), a notion deemed legally impossible by undersecretary Gianclaudio Bressa, and the negotiation started in May.

According to an opinion poll taken in June, 78.5% of Venetians would take part to the autonomy referendum, 78.4% would vote yes, 3.5% no and 18.1% did not know. According to the same poll, 70.7% of voters would participate also in the constitutional referendum, 41.3% would vote yes, 22.2% no and 36.5% did not know.

Contextually, two bills calling for an independence referendum were introduced in the Regional Council, one by Liga Veneta's Marino Finozzi, Gabriele Michieletto, Alessandro Montagnoli and Luciano Sandonà, with the support of Roberto Ciambetti (President of the Council), and the other by Antonio Guadagnini.

In April 2017 Zaia announced that the autonomy referendum would take place on 22 October, along with a similar referendum in Lombardy. 57.2% of Venetians participated in the referendum and 98.1% voted "yes". Consequently, President of Veneto Luca Zaia started a negotiation with the Italian government.

== People and movements ==
Prominent Venetists have included Guido Piovene, Goffredo Parise, Franco Rocchetta (founder of Liga Veneta), Ettore Beggiato (who wrote a book titled 1866: la grande truffa, meaning "1866: the great swindle"), Sabino Acquaviva (who prefaced the book by Beggiato), Gian Paolo Gobbo, Fabrizio Comencini, Alessio Morosin, Fabio Padovan, Giorgio Lago, Flaminio De Poli, Giampaolo Borsetto, Ivone Cacciavillani, Manuela Dal Lago, Luca Zaia, Flavio Tosi, Giorgio Vido, Giorgio Panto, Lodovico Pizzati, Antonio Guadagnini, Patrik Riondato, Loris Palmerini, and, to some extent, Giancarlo Galan, Massimo Cacciari and Mario Rigoni Stern.

In November 2009 the Corriere del Veneto, the regional edition of the Corriere della Sera in Veneto, published a broad overview of what it described as "Venetist galaxy". The newspaper counted around 20 notable Venetist organisations: along the four major Venetist parties of the time (Liga Veneta–Lega Nord, Liga Veneta Repubblica, North-East Project and Venetian National Party), a large variety of minor political parties, movements, cultural associations and trade unions were listed.

A prominent Venetist cultural association is Raixe Venete (Venetian Roots), which organises every year the well-known Festa dei Veneti in Cittadella. The association has strong links with separatists from all over Europe and especially from the Basque Country. At the Festa dei Veneti, Venetists of every political colour, politicians of different political parties (including non-Venetist, both right and left), Venetist associations, actors, comedians, flag-wavers, musicians (notably including Herman Medrano), rock bands, and many people meet at the beginning of September every year. In November 2009 Raixe Venete organised a demonstration in Venice in support of the teaching of Venetian in schools: a wide range of people took part, from Roberto Ciambetti, leader of Liga Veneta–Lega Nord in the Regional Council of Veneto, to Luca Casarini, a former far-left anti-globalisation activist and leader of the Tute Bianche in Veneto.

The European Federalist Free Entrepreneurs (LIFE) was formed in 1994 by a group of Venetist entrepreneurs (Fabio Padovan, Diego Cancian, etc.) who opposed the "fiscal and bureaucratic oppression" of the "Venetian people" by Italy and demanded fiscal federalism and autonomy for the region. In particular, they decided to organise themselves as a trade union, saying that they were the most oppressed workers in Italy.

Another notable association is Venetians Movement and was founded in 2006 by Patrik Riondato. Initially it presented itself as a cross-party political movement which aimed to promote independence in a democratic and nonviolent way. However, in 2010 it took part to the founding of the Party of the Venetians, a coalition of Venetist parties ranging from the centre-right to the far-left, which was later merged into Veneto State.

Among the youth, the strongest organisation is Independentist Youth, whose most representative figures are Giacomo Mirto and Stefano Danieli.

Other six leading although small groups are the self-proclaimed Venetian Most Serene Government (VSG), whose main leaders include Luigi Faccia and late Bepin Segato, Self-Government of the Venetian People led by Loris Palmerini, Venetian State of Vittorio Selmo, the Venetian National Liberation Movement (MLNV) led by Sergio Bortotto, the Venetian National Government of Gabriele De Pieri, and Self-Government of Venetia of Daniele Quaglia.

On the cultural side, it is worth of mention the Milizia Veneta (Venetian Militia), in practice a corp of people who perform historic representations of the Venetian army (including flag-raising at the Festa dei Veneti), Europa Veneta, Par San Marco and Veneti Eventi.

The Venetist movement has also several publications, notably including Quaderni Veneti and Rivista Veneti.

In the midst of the above-mentioned campaign for a referendum on independence, two non-party committees were launched: Plebiscite 2013 and Let Veneto Decide (later supplanted by United for Independent Veneto/We Independent Veneto/Independence We Veneto, which in turn became an electoral coalition of parties). A string of new parties was founded before and after the 2015 regional election and in the run-up of the 2017 autonomy referendum.

== Political parties ==
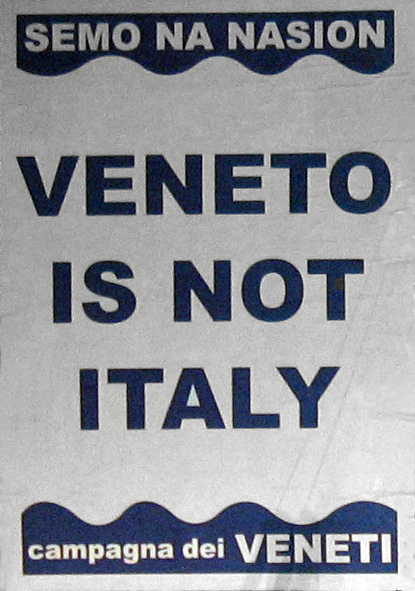
"We are a nation, Veneto is not Italy", a campaign for the 2009 local elections.

The first Venetist party in Veneto was Lion of Saint Mark (Leone di San Marco), active from 1921 to 1924 and commonly described as the forerunner of Venetian nationalist parties. It was founded by Italico Corradino Cappellotto, a member of the Chamber of Deputies for the Italian People's Party. The party participated in the 1921 general election in the constituencies of the provinces of Treviso and Venice, winning 6.1% of the vote in the province of Treviso and scoring around 20% in the very rural areas that would become the heartland of Liga Veneta sixty years later. The party was suppressed by Italian Fascism, along all the other parties.

Another Venetist party was the Venetian Regionalist Autonomous Movement (MARV), a cultural-political association, which was active in the 1960s. The first organised Venetist parties were started only after the institution of Veneto as Region and the direct election of the Regional Council in 1970.

Some Venetian parties campaign for federal reform, others for autonomy or a special statute for Veneto, others for an autonomous North-East region including Veneto, Friuli-Venezia Giulia and Trentino-Alto Adige/Südtirol, some others for outright independence. Since the late 1970s many regional parties were founded in Veneto, covering all the ideological spectrum:

- Liga Veneta (LV – started in 1979, part of Lega Nord since 1991)
- Liga Federativa Veneta (LFV – started in 1983, merged into MVRA in 1987)
- Liga Veneta Serenissima (LVS – started in 1984, merged into UPV in 1987)
- Venetian Most Serene Government (VSG – started in 1987, still active)
- Veneto Autonomous Region Movement (MVRA – started in 1987, merged into LVR/VdE in 2000)
- Union of the Venetian People (UPV – started in 1987, merged into LV in 1995)
- Lega Autonomia Veneta (LAV – started in 1991, merged into MNE in 1997)
- Liga Nathion Veneta (LNV – started in 1994, disbanded)
- North-East Union (UNE – started in 1996, briefly merged into LVR/VdE in 1999, disbanded)
- North-East Movement (MNE – started in 1997, merged into The Democrats in 1999)
- Liga Veneta Repubblica / Venetians of Europe (LVR/VdE – started in 1998, merged into LFV in 2002)
- Veneto Padanian Federal Republic (VRFP – started in 1999, disbanded)
- Liga dei Veneti (LdV – started in 1999, merged into PNE in 2004)
- Future Veneto (VF – started in 1999 as part of ApE, merged into LVR/VdE in 2000)
- Fronte Marco Polo (FMP – started in 1999, merged into LFV in 2002)
- Liga Fronte Veneto / Liga Veneta Repubblica (LFV/LVR – started in 2002, merger of LVR/VdE and FMP, joined NVI in 2014)
- Bellunese Autonomist Party (PAB – started in 2003, joined PdV in 2009)
- Free Veneto (VL – started in 2004, joined PdV in 2010)
- North-East Project (PNE – started in 2004, merged into UNE in 2010)
- Venetian Land (TV – started in 2006, disbanded)
- Venetians Movement (MV, started in 2006, joined PdV in 2009)
- Venetian State (SV, started in 2007, joined PdV in 2009)
- Party for Independent Veneto (started in 2007, disbanded)
- Venetian Agreement (IV – started in 2007, merged into UNE in 2010)
- Venetian National Party (PNV – started in 2007, joined VS in 2010)
- Independentist Youth (started in 2008, still active)
- Venetian People's Movement (MPV – started in 2008, disbanded)
- Venetian People's Unity (UPV – started in 2008, briefly joined PdV in 2009)
- Forum of Venetians (FdV – started in 2008, disbanded)
- Lega Lombardo Veneta (LLV – started in 2008, disbanded)
- Venetian National Liberation Movement (MLNV – started in 2009, still active)
- Venetie for Self-Government (VpA – started in 2009, disbanded)
- Veneto Freedom / Party of the Venetians (VF/PdV – coalition, started in 2009, merged into VS in 2010)
- Party of Venetians (PdV - started in 2010, merged into VS in 2010)
- Liga Veneto Autonomo (LVA – started in 2010, disbanded)
- Veneto State (VS – started in 2010, joined NVI in 2014, disbanded)
- Community Democratic League / Venetian Project (LDC/PV – started in 2011, merged into VS in 2012)
- Venetian Independence (IV – started in 2012, joined the PdV of 2019 in 2019)
- Plebiscito.eu / Veneto Yes (both started in 2012)
- Veneto First (PiV – started in 2013, joined the Greath North)
- Venetian Left (Sanca Veneta – started in 2013)
- Independent Venetians (VI – started in 2014, joined NVI/INV in 2014, disbanded)
- We Independent Veneto / Independence We Veneto (NVI/INV – coalition, started in 2014, disbanded)
- Venetian Left (Sinistra Veneta – started in 2015, merged into Italian Left in 2017)
- Tosi List for Veneto (LTV – started in 2015, merged into FI in 2022)
- We Are Veneto (SV - started in 2016, joined the PdV of 2019 in 2019)
- Venetian Centre-Right (CDV – started in 2017 disbanded in 2020)
- Veneto for Autonomy (VpA – started in 2017, joined FI in 2020)
- Party of Venetians (PdV – coalition, started in 2019)
- Resist Veneto (RV, started in 2025)

== Achievements ==
=== Venetian language and culture ===
Venetian is a non-standardised Romance language, that comes from Latin, not Italian. It has undergone Italian influences over the years, which have raised doubts on its identity, and includes several local varieties. The Venetian language is protected by some private institutions, such as the Academia deła bona creansa and the Venetian Language Institute. The United Nations includes in its website a Venetian translation of the Universal Declaration of Human Rights.

UNESCO gives to Venetian the status of not endangered language, as it is usually spoken in Veneto, Trentino, Friuli-Venezia Giulia (mainly in the provinces of Pordenone and Trieste), Croatia (mainly in Istria), Rio Grande do Sul and Santa Catarina in Brazil, and Chipilo in Mexico. Venetian is a recognised language by UNESCO, Brazil and the Veneto region with the ISO 639-3 "vec" identifier, the same used by the Venetian-language Wikipedia, but not by Italy.

In 2007 Veneto recognised Venetian as official language of the region, alongside Italian, instituted an official website for standard Venetian and proclaimed a yearly "Day of the Venetian People" (Festa del Popolo Veneto) on 25 March, anniversary of the foundation of Venice. In 2011 the Regional Council officially requested to the Italian Parliament to protect Venetian as a minority language under Italian law. Soon after the 2010 regional election, Daniele Stival (LV), new regional minister for Venetian Identity, appointed a commission of experts which will fix the rules of standard Venetian language and the official Venetian names of all 581 municipalities of Veneto. The commissioners included: Davide Guiotto, president of Raixe Venete; Gianfranco Cavallin, writer and linguist close to Raixe Venete; Sabino Acquaviva, sociologist and avowed Venetist; Rodolfo Delmonte, linguist; Michele Brunelli, linguist; Lodovico Pizzati, economist and secretary of Veneto State (later of Venetian Independence).

=== Statute of Veneto (1971 and 2011) ===
Most notably, the Statute of Veneto, first approved in 1971 and rewritten in 2011, cites the "Venetian people". In article 1 it proclaims Veneto as "an autonomous region" and in article 2 that "the self-government of the people of Veneto is implemented in forms corresponding to the features and the traditions of its history. The Region contributes to the enhancement of the linguistic and cultural heritage of its individual communities".

=== Resolution 42/1998 on self-determination ===
In April 1998 the Regional Council of Veneto approved resolution 42 concerning the "self-determination" of the "Venetian people". The resolution read: "The Venetian people [...] invokes its right to a democratic and direct referendum for the free expression of its right to self-determination". In 2006 the Regional Council officially asked to reform the Constitution of Italy in order to allow Veneto to be an autonomous region like its neighbours Friuli-Venezia Giulia and Trentino-Alto Adige/Südtirol.

=== Acts 10/1998 and 28/2017: display of the Venetian flag ===
Also in April 1998 the Regional Council approved a bill, signed into law as act 10/1998, which mandated the display of the Venetian flag outside regional institutions and offices, provincial institutions and offices, municipal institutions and offices, schools, universities and polling stations, besides Italian and European Union flags.

In September 2017 the Regional Council approved a bill, signed into law as act 28/2017, reinforcing the provisions of act 10/1998. Among other things, the law extended compulsory display of the Venetian flag to Italian governmental offices in Veneto and "every time Italian and European Union flags are displayed". This part of the law was declared unconstitutional by the Constitutional Court in October 2018, after that the challenge posed by the Italian government.

=== Act 28/2016: Venetians as "national minority" ===
In December 2016 the Regional Council approved a bill, signed into law as act 28/2016, aimed at recognising Venetians as a "national minority" (under the Framework Convention for the Protection of National Minorities), protecting Venetian language and opening the way to its teaching in public schools. This law was challenged by the Italian government and finally overturned by the Constitutional Court in April 2018.

== Controversies ==
=== St Mark's Campanile assault ===
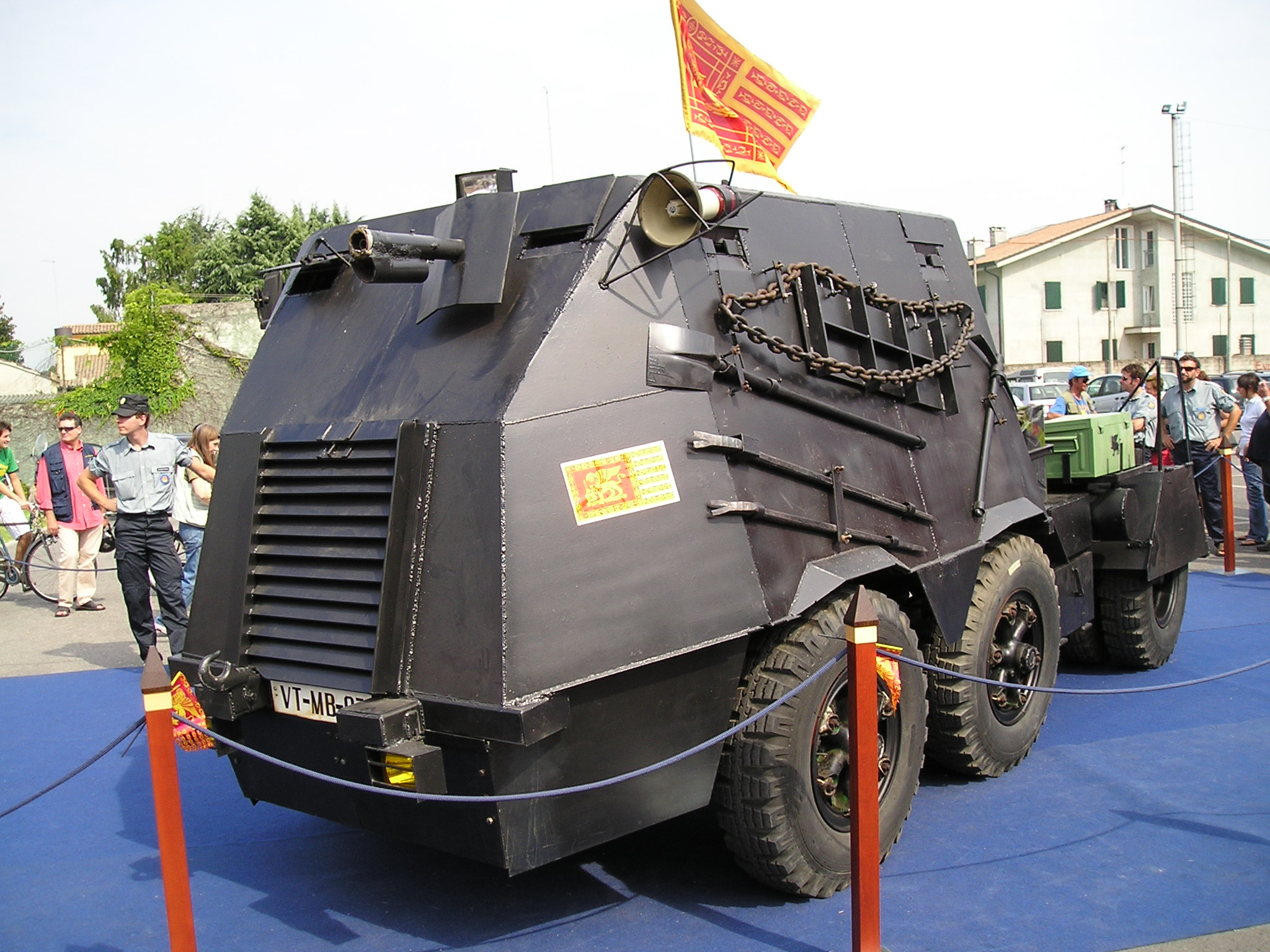
The Tanko, the improvised armoured vehicle with which the Serenissimi "assaulted" Piazza San Marco on 8 May 1997.

During the night between 8 and 9 May 1997 a group of armed Venetist separatists, the so-called Serenissimi, occupied Piazza San Marco and the St Mark's Campanile in Venice in order to proclaim the "independence of Veneto". After eight hours barred in the Campanile, the Carabinieri entered and arrested the group.

The members of the group, including the two leaders of the Venetian Most Serene Government (Veneto Serenissimo Governo), Luigi Faccia and Bepin Segato, who did not take part to the action itself, were all jailed, tried and sentenced to prison. The effort, which was more symbolic than anything else, was criticised by Umberto Bossi and Roberto Maroni, leaders of Lega Nord, at that time proponents of the independence of Padania, while it was praised by Gianfranco Miglio, a former senator of the League who was then elected as an independent for the centre-right Pole of Freedoms. The Serenissimi soon became a sort of "heroes" for many Venetists and the "tank", the improvised armoured vehicle with which they reached Piazza San Marco on that night is usually an exhibit at the yearly Festa dei Veneti and at other rallies of that kind, also outside Veneto. Segato was a candidate of Liga Veneta Repubblica in the 2001 general election and came short of election to the Italian Senate, having received 9.8% of the vote in the constituency of Schio.

Representatives of most political parties in Veneto, including centre-left figures, defended the Serenissimi: Claudio Rizzato of the Democrats of the Left praised the "noble ideals" of the group, while Massimo Cacciari, the Democratic mayor of Venice, and Gianfranco Bettin, a Green former deputy mayor of Venice, campaigned for the pardon to those in jail, along with Liga Veneta and the regional section of Forza Italia. Some of them were not embarrassed in taking part to a rally, the Festa dei Veneti, where the tanko was on exhibit. More recently also Lega Nord founder Umberto Bossi and Roberto Calderoli, praised them and another leghista, Roberto Castelli, as minister of Justice in 2003, proposed a pardon for Faccia, who refused it.

=== The MLNV and the "Venetian Police" ===
In November 2009 some members of the Venetian National Liberation Movement, who had proclaimed themselves "National Liberation Movement of the Venetian People", were prosecuted on the charge of having built a paramilitary organisation. The Italian police seized arms and uniforms of the so-called Polisia Veneta (Venetian Police) led by Sergio Bortotto at the headquarters of the movement in Treviso. According to the police, the group had planned an assault on Luca Zaia, a leading member of Liga Veneta–Lega Nord, during the Festa dei Veneti of 2009, because he agreed to become the minister of Agriculture in Berlusconi IV Cabinet, which they perceived as betrayal of the Venetist ideals. However the attack did not take place, since Zaia failed to show up in Cittadella on that occasion. The next day Zaia declared: "Maybe those people confuse Venetism with something different. Being a Venetist, for me, means defending our heritage, promoting the language and the literature of this region".

In September 2017 all members of the MLNV were fully acquitted.

=== Cancellation of the annexation of Veneto ===
On 8 February 2011, the Corriere del Veneto reported that the act by which the Kingdom of Italy annexed the remaining portion of the Kingdom of Lombardy–Venetia (including Veneto, Friuli, and the province of Mantua) in 1866 was cancelled by a decree that came into force on 13 December 2010, most likely by government mistake. It is unclear whether this will have any real and direct consequence, or will only be used by independentist groups to pursue a lawsuit in favour of an independent Venetian state (perhaps in front of the European Court of Justice) as previously done.

The debate began a day later, with independentist and autonomist groups declaring that Veneto is no longer part of Italy. Political and juridical opinion are conflicted on whether Veneto still belongs to Italy or not, and a regional inquiry is due. On the following day, ministerial staff explained that the annexation act was cancelled because it had already been superseded by the Constitution of Italy, which ensures national unity. However, independentist groups were quick to point out not all legal opinions agree with this interpretation. In particular, the Treaty of Osimo, signed in 1975 by Italy and Yugoslavia, formally transferred the sovereignty of Italian "Zone-B" to Yugoslavia without any changes to the Constitution. This precedent show that the borders of the Italian Republic (hence the territory subject to the Italian Constitution) are established by means of international treaties, not the Constitution itself. Independentists have also argued that Italy can't determine its territorial extent in its own Constitution, as this would suggest it's legal for a state to unilaterally annex the territory of another state.

=== Garibaldi's effigy burning controversy ===
During the night between 28 February and 1 March 2011, at a Venetian New Year's Day's bruxamarso (a party which traditionally includes the stake of the passing year), a group of Venetists put at stake a shape of Giuseppe Garibaldi with a banner around the neck reading "l'eroe degli immondi" ("the hero of the unclean"), instead of "l'eroe dei due mondi" ("the hero of the two worlds"). The party was organised by Raixe Venete, Independentist Youth, Bortolino Sartore (leader of Liga Veneto Autonomo) and Patrick Riondato (leader of the Venetians Movement and leading member of Veneto State) and was attended by assorted Venetists, including several members of Liga Veneta.

Luca Zaia, President of Veneto and leading member of Liga Veneta, while criticizing Garibaldi, dissociated from the act: "I love Veneto. I consider myself a Venetist, but burning a shape is a signal to be wary of" when "behind a shape there is a person". Also Luca Schenato, then leading member of Veneto State and contributor of Press News Veneto, a news website close to the party, criticised the act by saying that it "reminded me other latitudes where it is common to burn puppets of political enemies of the flags of Israel and the United States": "I do not see any need for that because my message is not of hate or war. My message and my thought are joyful, proactive and forward-looking. Raixe Venete, for its part, precised that it organised the party but not the burning itself.

=== Alleged terrorist plot ===
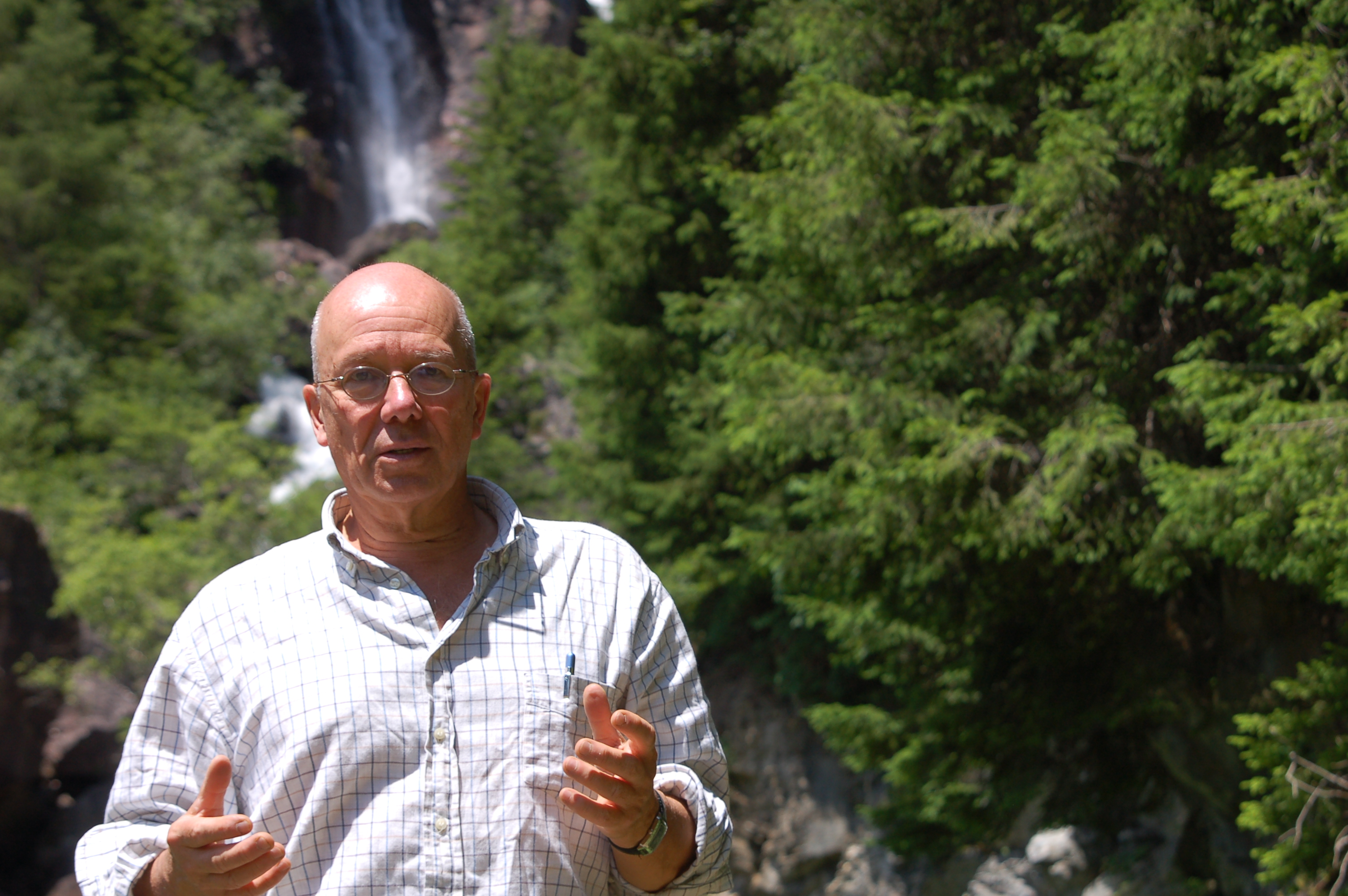
Franco Rocchetta in 2013.

On 2 April 2014 a group of separatists, notably including Luigi Faccia and Flavio Contin of the Venetian Most Serene Government, LIFE's president Lucio Chiavegato and Franco Rocchetta, were arrested for suspected crimes including criminal association for terrorism and subversion of the democratic order. According to prosecutors, the group, which benefited from the collaboration by Venetists from the province of Brescia and separatists from other regions (including a group of Sardinians and Roberto Bernardelli, leader of Padanian Union), were preparing a remake of 1997's assault to St Mark's Campanile in Venice and a violent pro-independence demonstration in the run-up of the European Parliament election. A scraper turned tank, which was allegedly to be deployed in Piazza San Marco, was confiscated by Carabinieri.

In jail Faccia proclaimed himself "war prisoner" and answer to questions (as Contin, in house arrest, and Lovato), Chiavegato started a 17-day hunger strike, while Rocchetta declared his innocence and pacifism.

Many politicians, notably including President of Veneto Luca Zaia, and intellectuals called for an immediate release of the detained Venetists. Lega Nord organised a demonstration in Verona, Plebiscite 2013 compared Rocchetta to Nelson Mandela and other Venetists offered similar views. Also Clodovaldo Ruffato, President of the Regional Council, and Maurizio Sacconi, both of the New Centre-Right, expressed doubts on the investigation. On the left, Massimo Cacciari, Gianfranco Bettin and Beppe Caccia wrote a plea and remarked Rocchetta's pacifism: "In all the occasions in which we confronted ourselves with him, his idea of independence was a whole with the European perspective and the recognition of the rights of citizenship founded on jus soli and residence. [...] He is a world away from 'secessionisms' and the politics of exclusion and racist closedness. With him we shared initiatives in the Balkans aimed at intercultural and interreligious dialogue, in terms of total opposition to the savagery of war and ethnic cleansing. [...] For how we knew him, we feel we can exclude his involvement in 'terroristic or subversive' activities [...]". Also the network of the far-left social centres expressed their sympathy for Rocchetta, with whom they shared some initiatives in the late 1990s, and the other Venetists; Tommaso Cacciari, one of the leaders of the movement, said that "we are without hesitation on the side of those who seek autonomy and independence against a state which is able to respond to these demands only with the inquiries of the judiciary and Carabinieri" and talked about the "signals of a national sovereignty in crisis".

On 18 April Rocchetta and Chiavegato were released from prison as the tribunal of Brescia did not uphold the accusations of criminal association for terrorism and subversion of the democratic order. Most of the detained Venetists had been released earlier or were released right after, with the notable exceptions of Faccia and Contin, who refused to ask to be released. On 25 April, Feast of Saint Mark and Liberation Day, the released prisoners were celebrated in Venice. The rally was not approved by police authorities and criticised by the leader of the Venetian section of the National Association of Italian Partisans. Rocchetta, who wrote a letter to Corriere del Veneto to explain how the two anniversaries were not conflicting and that he was going to celebrate both, was hugged by Tommaso Cacciari.

All the defendants were determined not guilty of any wrongdoing and completely acquitted in July 2018. However, seven of them, notably including former Serenissimi Faccia and Contin, were later sentenced to various years of prison in July 2020.

== See also ==
- Politics of Veneto
- List of political parties in Veneto
- Republic of Venice
- Triveneto
- List of active separatist movements in Europe
