= Venetian National Liberation Movement =

The Venetian National Liberation Movement (Movimento di Liberazione Nazionale del Popolo Veneto, MLNV) is a national liberation movement which seeks self-determination for the former territories of the Republic of Venice, currently divided in three Italian regions: Veneto, Lombardy and Friuli-Venezia Giulia.

The MLNV was founded in September 2009 and is led by Sergio Bortotto. In November 2009 the MLNV was investigated on the charge of having built a paramilitary organization. The Italian police seized weapons at the home of one of the members, and uniforms of the so-called Polisia Veneta (Venetian Police) in the headquarters of the movement in Treviso. According to the police, the group had planned to attack Luca Zaia, a member of Liga Veneta–Lega Nord. In December 2011, Constitutional Court of Italy ruled that a law that abolished a ban on the formation of paramilitary forces was in accordance with the Constitution of Italy, which meant MLNV could no longer be prosecuted for forming a paramilitary force. In September 2017, all members of the MLNV were acquitted of any accusation because they were determined to be unfounded.

In February 2012, MLNV organised an event in Vicenza to present their plans for Venetian nationalism movement, inviting Venetian nationalist groups to attend. The convention was attended by representatives of the Antonio Guadagnini faction of Veneto State, and activist groups the Venetian Most Serene Government, the Venetian National Government, Self-Government of Venetia, Venetian State and the Friulian Front. The MLNV announced the establishment of the "Provisional Government of the Venetian Republic" (GVP) in compliance with art. 96.3 of the Geneva Protocol I.

On 22 January 2015, the GVP signed an agreement recognizing Donetsk People's Republic. On 25 August 2015, the foreign ministry of the Donetsk People's Republic sent a diplomatic note expressing "respect and interest in the development of equal relations and bilateral cooperations" with the GVP.

== Leadership ==
- President: Sergio Bortotto (2009–present)
