= 2013 Italian social protests =

- Date: 15 November 2013 – 18 December 2013 (1 month and 3 days)
- Location: Italy; several locations
- Caused by: Austerity measures; Tax hikes; Recession; Red tape; Globalization; Corruption in Italy; High fuel prices
- Methods: Demonstrations, protest marches, sit-ins, strike actions, roadblocks, vandalism, online activism

Casualties and losses
Injured: Dozens; Arrested: 17	Injured: 14 (police)

Locations of the protests

In 2013, protests occurred in many parts of Italy, starting on 15 November and ending on 18 December although several protests continued until February.

Usual targets have been the government, high taxation, red tape, established parties, the European Union, the Euro, the Common Agricultural Policy, and Globalization. The protesters' goals include the overthrow of Enrico Letta's government, the resignation of President Giorgio Napolitano and the dissolution of Parliament. Some went so far as to propose the formation of a military junta to lead the country out of Eurozone.

The whole protests, including rallies, demonstrations and blockades of highways and rail service, were dubbed by journalists Pitchfork protests from the name of one of the leading participants: the Sicilian-based "Pitchforks Movement", which has been active in Sicily since 2011 and was characterised by an autonomist streak. In the 2012 Sicilian regional election the Pitchforks supported either Mariano Ferro (candidate for "People of Pitchworks") or Cateno De Luca (candidate for "Sicilian Revolution"), who both hailed from the Movement for the Autonomies and received a combined 2.5% of the vote.

Several groups, sometimes in conflict one with another, have animated protests, benefiting from a loose or non-existent coordination. They included a diverse bunch of groups: the original Pitchfork Movement, associations of truck drivers, environmental activists, farmers, entrepreneurs, unemployed people, football fans, minor political parties (including New Force and CasaPound, two far-right movements), and a plethora of local groups. The European Federalist Free Entrepreneurs (LIFE), a libertarian and mainly Venetian nationalist organization led by Lucio Chiavegato (a former president of Veneto State), has been playing a big role in Veneto.

The committee which organized the first protests, the "National Coordination 9 December 2013", was led by Mariano Ferro, Lucio Chiavegato and Danilo Calvani (a farmer from Lazio).

In December 2013, Pitchfork spokesman Andrea Zunino claimed that Italy was a "slave" to Jewish bankers; this antisemitic remark was widely condemned. As a result of this and of neo-fascist infiltrations, Ferro and Chiavegato, who distanced himself from neo-fascists and Italian nationalists, decided not to take part to the 18 December demonstration in Rome.

In March 2014 Chiavegato announced that the 9 December Movement had been dissolved and that he would concentrate again on Veneto only.

In April, Chiavegato and other leading members of the LIFE were arrested, along with other Venetian separatists (including Franco Rocchetta and two members of the Venetian Most Serene Government), for suspected crimes including criminal association for terrorism and subversion of the democratic order. Chiavegato, who endured a 17-day hunger strike in jail, was released on 18 April, along with Rocchetta and most of the others, as the tribunal of Brescia did not uphold the accusations.

== Timeline ==
15 November

Thousands of students protested in major university centers in the country against proposed spending cuts in the 2014 budget. Scuffles broke out with riot police at some marches as protesters rallied in Rome, Turin and Palermo.

26 November

On 26 November 2013 Trasportounito, a truckers' union, announced a strike which would take place from 9 December through 13 December. On 4 December 2013 thousands of people gathered in Brenner, the Austrian-Italian border, to protest the counterfeited goods imported abroad.

9 December 2013

Thousands of farmers, lorry drivers, pensioners and unemployed people have taken to the streets in Italy as part of a series of protests against the government and the European Union. Demonstrators stopped train services by walking on the tracks while striking lorry drivers disrupted traffic by driving slowly and blocking roads.

10 December 2013

In Turin, police officers used tear gas to disperse demonstrators who had been throwing rocks and bottles at the headquarters of Italy's tax collection agency. Two demonstrators were arrested for violence. An additional number of 32 people were given police warnings for blocking roads.

In Savona, near Genova, protesters broke into a bookshop urging the owner to "shut down the store and set fire to the books".

11 December 2013

On 11 December, violence erupted in Milan when 20 Ajax fans, who had arrived in the city for the Champions League game against AC Milan, got off their bus and hurled beer cans and insults at the demonstrators in the central Loreto Square. Police intervened quickly to break up the fighting, but five Ajax supporters and an Italian peddler were injured.

12 December 2013

In Rome, hundreds of students clashed with police and threw firecrackers outside a university where government ministers were attending a conference. "Our university isn’t a catwalk for those who peddle austerity" read a banner. Clashes have been also reported in Ventimiglia, a locality on the Italian-French border.

14 December 2013

A group of protesters of the neo-fascist movement CasaPound attacked the headquarters of the European Union in Rome. The leader of the movement, Simone Di Stefano, ripped the EU flag from the balcony of the building and replaced it with the Italian one. The protesters have been charged by the police and, after tough fighting, ten of them, including Di Stefano, have been arrested.

18 December 2013

After the renouncement of Mariano Ferro and Lucio Chiavegato to take part to the demonstration in Rome, Danilo Calvani, the leader of Lazio's factions of the movement, remained the only one to participate to it. Simone Di Stefano, the Vice-President of the neo-fascist CasaPound said that his movement will take part to the protest. The Ministry of the Interior deployed 2,000 police officers to maintain security.

== See also ==
- List of protests in the 21st century
- Sardines Movement
