= 2020 Italian regional elections =

- 26 January 2020; 20–21 September 2020

Presidents and regional assemblies of Aosta Valley, Apulia, Calabria, Campania, Emilia-Romagna, Liguria, Marche, Tuscany and Veneto

The 2020 Italian regional elections took place in nine regions of Italy in 2020. Elections took place on 26 January 2020 in Emilia-Romagna and Calabria, and on 20 and 21 September in Aosta Valley, Campania, Liguria, Marche, Apulia, Tuscany, and Veneto.

The September elections took place together with the 2020 Italian constitutional referendum.

== Overall results ==
=== Regional councils ===
Alliance	Votes	%	Seats
Centre-right coalition	5,492,711	46.2	162 / 337
Centre-left coalition	5,215,764	43.8	156 / 337
Five Star Movement	725,156	6.1	19 / 337
Others	469,002	3.9	0 / 337
Total	11,902,633	100	337 / 337

Party	Votes	%	Seats
Democratic Party (PD)	2,518,668	21.01	92 / 337
Lega	2,042,659	17.04	66 / 337
Brothers of Italy (FdI)	1,222,020	10.19	36 / 337
Five Star Movement (M5S)	815,002	6.08	19 / 337
Forza Italia (FI)	634,745	5.03	18 / 337
Others	4,753,934	40.65	166 / 337
Total	11,987,026	100.00	337 / 337
Source: Ministry of the Interior

=== Presidents of the regions ===
Region	Election day	Outgoing			Elected		
Region	Election day	President	Party	Alliance	President	Party	Alliance
Calabria	26 January	Mario Oliverio	PD	Centre-left	Jole Santelli	FI	Centre-right
Emilia-Romagna	26 January	Stefano Bonaccini	PD	Centre-left	Stefano Bonaccini	PD	Centre-left
Aosta Valley	20–21 September	Renzo Testolin (acting)	UV	UV–SA–FA–ALPE	Erik Lavévaz	UV	Centre-left
Apulia	20–21 September	Michele Emiliano	PD	Centre-left	Michele Emiliano	PD	Centre-left
Campania	20–21 September	Vincenzo De Luca	PD	Centre-left	Vincenzo De Luca	PD	Centre-left
Liguria	20–21 September	Giovanni Toti	C!	Centre-right	Giovanni Toti	C!	Centre-right
Marche	20–21 September	Luca Ceriscioli	PD	Centre-left	Francesco Acquaroli	FdI	Centre-right
Tuscany	20–21 September	Enrico Rossi	PD	Centre-left	Eugenio Giani	PD	Centre-left
Veneto	20–21 September	Luca Zaia	Lega	Centre-right	Luca Zaia	Lega	Centre-right

== Summary by region ==
=== Calabria ===
President				Regional council			
Candidate	Party	Votes	%	Alliance	Votes	%	Seats
Jole Santelli	FI	449,705	55.3	Centre-right	444,818	57.1	20
Filippo Callipo	IRC	245,154	30.1	Centre-left	227,598	29.2	11
Others		118.496	14.6	Others	106,186	13.7	0
Voters: 840,563 — Turnout: 44.3%

=== Emilia-Romagna ===
President				Regional council			
Candidate	Party	Votes	%	Alliance	Votes	%	Seats
Stefano Bonaccini	PD	1,195,742	51.4	Centre-left	1,040,482	48.1	29
Lucia Borgonzoni	Lega	1,014,672	43.6	Centre-right	981,787	45.4	19
Simone Benini	M5S	80,823	3.5	M5S	102,595	4.7	2
Others		34,260	1.5	Others	37,352	1.7	0
Voters: 2,373,974 — Turnout: 67.7%

=== Apulia ===
President				Regional council			
Candidate	Party	Votes	%	Alliance	Votes	%	Seats
Michele Emiliano	PD	871,028	46.8	Centre-left	759,732	45.3	28
Raffaele Fitto	FdI	724,928	38.9	Centre-right	694,536	41.4	18
Antonella Laricchia	M5S	207,038	11.1	M5S	175,140	10.5	5
Others		59,029	3.2	Others	47,091	3.8	0
Voters: 2,011,681 — Turnout: 56.4%

=== Campania ===
President				Regional council			
Candidate	Party	Votes	%	Alliance	Votes	%	Seats
Vincenzo De Luca	PD	1,789,017	69.5	Centre-left	1,616,540	68.6	33
Stefano Caldoro	FI	464,921	18.1	Centre-right	450,856	19.1	11
Valeria Ciarambino	M5S	255,714	9.9	M5S	233,974	9.9	7
Others		65,066	2.6	Others	56,240	2.4	0
Voters: 2,774,104 — Turnout: 55.5%

=== Liguria ===
President				Regional council			
Candidate	Party	Votes	%	Alliance	Votes	%	Seats
Giovanni Toti	C!	383,053	56.1	Centre-right	354,111	56.5	19
Ferruccio Sansa	Ind	265,506	38.9	Centre-left	242,652	38.7	12
Others		33,931	5.0	Others	29,662	4.8	0
Voters: 716,211 — Turnout: 53.4%

=== Marche ===
President				Regional council			
Candidate	Party	Votes	%	Alliance	Votes	%	Seats
Francesco Acquaroli	FdI	361,186	49.1	Centre-right	325,140	52.2	20
Maurizio Mangialardi	PD	274,152	37.3	Centre-left	227,183	36.5	9
Gian Mario Mercorelli	M5S	63,355	8.6	M5S	44,330	7.1	2
Others		36,417	5.0	Others	26,301	4.2	0
Voters: 783,173 — Turnout: 59.7%

=== Tuscany ===
President				Regional council			
Candidate	Party	Votes	%	Alliance	Votes	%	Seats
Eugenio Giani	PD	864,310	48.6	Centre-left	764,123	47.1	25
Susanna Ceccardi	Lega	719,266	40.5	Centre-right	659,058	40.6	14
Irene Galletti	M5S	113,796	6.4	M5S	113,836	7.0	2
Others		80,437	4.5	Others	86,137	5.3	0
Voters: 1,870,283 — Turnout: 62.6%

=== Veneto ===
President				Regional council			
Candidate	Party	Votes	%	Alliance	Votes	%	Seats
Luca Zaia	Lega	1,883,959	76.8	Centre-right	1,582,405	77.0	41
Arturo Lorenzoni	Ind	385,768	15.7	Centre-left	337,454	16.4	9
Enrico Cappelletti	M5S	79,662	3.3	M5S	55,281	2.7	1
Others		104,129	4.4	Others	80,033	3.9	0
Voters: 2,522,920 — Turnout: 61.1%
