= Venetian Left (2013) =

Venetian Left Sanca Veneta
- Leader: Collective leadership
- Founded: December 2013 – July 2015
- Ideology: Social democracy Green politics Venetian nationalism Civic nationalism Direct democracy
- Political position: Centre-left to left-wing
- European affiliation: European Free Alliance Youth

Website
- sancaveneta.org

Venetian Left (Venetian: Sanca Veneta, SV) is a social-democratic and green political party in Veneto, embracing pro-Europeanism, internationalism, as well as Venetian nationalism and separatism. Its first leaders were Matteo Visonà Dalla Pozza and Giovanni Masarà. Its current leaders are Antonella Muzzolon and Matteo Visonà Dalla Pozza. The party is a member of the European Free Alliance Youth (EFAY).

== History ==
During a Venetist demonstration in Bassano del Grappa in December 2013, a group of left-leaning Venetists occasionally met and decided to start SV, which was officially founded as a full-fledged party in July 2015.

In the run-up of the 2017 autonomy referendum SV has been quite involved in campaigning, especially through "VIVA – Centre/Left Committee for the Autonomy of Veneto", which included the regional councillor Cristina Guarda as well as minor members of the Democratic Party. The party has celebrated both Liberation Day and the Feast of Saint Mark, patron of Veneto, in Venice on 25 April, every year.

In 2018 SV member Andrea Cordioli ran at the head of the Borgo Libero list in the municipal election of Villafranca di Verona. The list obtained 4.0% of the vote and Cordioli was elected councillor.

Masarà was one of EFAY vice presidents until 2019 when, as part of the renewal of the bureau, he was replaced by former Sanca co-leader Andrea Mion and later Diego Cavallaro.

SV took part to the 2020 Venetian regional election within the centre-left coalition supporting independent professor Arturo Lorenzoni for President of Veneto and obtained 0.1% of the vote. Lorenzoni himself was defeated by Luca Zaia, the incumbent President hailing from the rival Liga Veneta party, 76.8% to 15.7%.
