= 2020 Venetian regional election =

Italian regional election

- 20–21 September 2020

All 51 seats to the Regional Council of Veneto
- Turnout: 61.1% (▲3.9%)
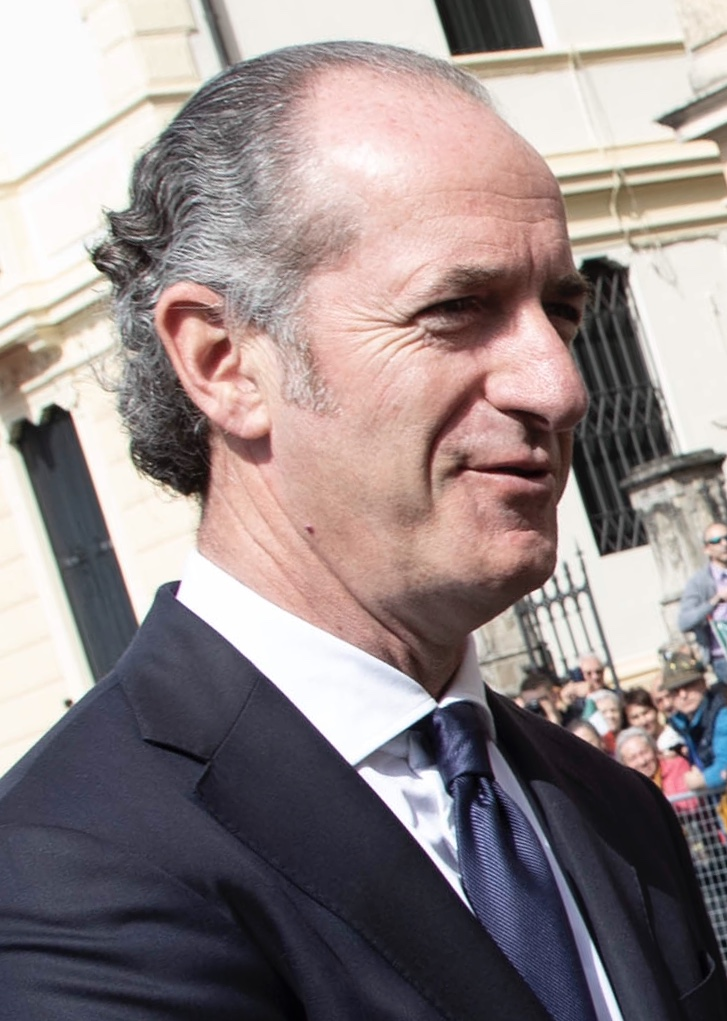

	Majority party	Minority party
Leader	Luca Zaia	Arturo Lorenzoni
Party	League	Independent
Alliance	Centre-right	Centre-left
Seats won	41	9
Seat change	▲10	▼3
Popular vote	1,883,959	385,768
Percentage	76.79%	15.72%
Swing	▲26.71%	▼7.02%
President before election
Luca Zaia
Lega Nord
Elected President
Luca Zaia
Lega

The 2020 Venetian regional election took place in Veneto on 20 and 21 September 2020.

Originally scheduled to take place on 31 May 2020, it was delayed due to the coronavirus pandemic in Italy and was part of a round of multiple regional elections in Italy (7 regions out of 20). Venetian voters elected their President and their Regional Council, composed of 51 members including the President.

Luca Zaia, the second-term incumbent president and leading member of the League, was re-elected by a record 76.8% of the vote, the highest tally for a regional President in Italy. The runner-up, Arturo Lorenzoni, backed mainly by the Democratic Party, won 15.7% of the vote.

Regarding parties results, the League ran in this election presenting two lists: the official League list and a list named after Zaia. Combined, the two lists won 61.5% of the vote. The Democratic Party came second with 11.9% and Brothers of Italy came third with 9.6%.

== Electoral system ==
The Regional Council of Veneto is composed of 50 seats. The president elect is the candidate winning a plurality of votes. The council seats are distributed according to proportional representation, with a majority bonus system assigning 60% of the 50 seats to the lists running with the candidate winning more than 40% of the votes.

A single list must win at least 3% of the votes in order to access the seats distribution, while a coalition must win over 5% of the votes.

== Parties and candidates ==
Political party or alliance	Constituent lists	Previous result		Candidate
Political party or alliance	Constituent lists	Votes (%)	Seats	Candidate
Centre-right coalition	Zaia for President (ZP)	23.1	13	Luca Zaia
Centre-right coalition	League – Venetian League (Lega–LV)	17.8	10	Luca Zaia
Centre-right coalition	Forza Italia (FI) (incl. UDC and LTV)	6.0	3	Luca Zaia
Centre-right coalition	Venetian Autonomy List (LVA)	2.7	1	Luca Zaia
Centre-right coalition	Brothers of Italy (FdI)	2.6	1	Luca Zaia
Centre-left coalition	Democratic Party (PD)	16.7	8	Arturo Lorenzoni
Centre-left coalition	Veneto We Want (incl. Art.1, SI and Pos)	—N/a	—N/a	Arturo Lorenzoni
Centre-left coalition	More Veneto in Europe – Volt	—N/a	—N/a	Arturo Lorenzoni
Centre-left coalition	Green Europe (EV) (incl. DemoS)	—N/a	—N/a	Arturo Lorenzoni
Centre-left coalition	Venetian Left (SV)	—N/a	—N/a	Arturo Lorenzoni
Five Star Movement (M5S)		10.4	5	Enrico Cappelletti
Party of Venetians (PdV)		2.5	–	Antonio Guadagnini
Solidarity Environment Work (incl. PRC and PCI)		0.8	–	Paolo Benvegnù
Daniela Sbrollini for President (IV – PSI – PRI – Civic List for Veneto)		—N/a	—N/a	Daniela Sbrollini
Veneto Ecology Solidarity (incl. IiC)		—N/a	—N/a	Patrizia Bartelle
Veneto for the Autonomies (VpA)		—N/a	—N/a	Simonetta Rubinato
3V Movement (M3V)		—N/a	—N/a	Paolo Girotto

== Opinion polls ==
=== Candidates ===
Date	Polling firm/ Client	Sample size	Zaia	Lorenzoni	Cappelletti	Sbrollini	Others	Undecided	Lead
21 Sep 2020	Opinio (exit poll)	–	72.0–76.0	16.0–20.0	3.0–5.0	0.0–2.0	–	–	56.0
21 Sep 2020	Tecnè (intention poll)	–	71.5–75.5	16.0–20.0	2.0–6.0	—N/a	–	–	55.5
1–3 Sep 2020	Ipsos	850	74.0	16.3	4.9	1.0	3.8	8.8	57.7
27 Aug–1 Sep 2020	Demos	610	76.0	14.0	—N/a	—N/a	10.0	30.0	62.0
24 Aug–2 Sep 2020	Noto	—N/a	71–75	18–22	2–6	—N/a	1–5	—N/a	49–57
24 Aug 2020	Tecnè	2,000	70–74	16–20	3–7	2–4	2–4	—N/a	50–58
19–20 Aug 2020	Winpoll	1,008	76.8	15.5	3.8	1.1	2.8	18.0	61.3
30–31 Jul 2020	Tecnè	1,000	70.0	18.0	6.0	4.0	2.0	17.7	52.0
24–25 Jun 2020	Noto	1,000	70.0	18.0	7.0	2.0	3.0	—N/a	52.0

=== Parties ===
Date	Polling firm	Sample size	Centre-right				Centre-left					M5S	IV	PdV	Others	Undecided	Lead
Date	Polling firm	Sample size	Zaia	Lega	FI	FdI	PD	VCV	+Eu	EV	Other	M5S	IV	PdV	Others	Undecided	Lead
1–3 Sep 2020	Ipsos	850	34.5	23.5	3.5	8.8	15.1	0.7	0.3	0.9	1.4	5.2	1.3	—N/a	4.8	12.7	11.0
27 Aug–1 Sep 2020	Demos	610	44.0	14.0	4.0	9.0	13.0	—N/a	—N/a	—N/a	4.0	—N/a	—N/a	—N/a	12.0	35.0	30.0
19–20 Aug 2020	Winpoll	1,008	33.6	26.8	3.3	10.3	10.7	3.0	0.9	—N/a	2.0	4.7	1.8	—N/a	2.9	—N/a	6.8
3–5 Aug 2020	Fabbrica Politica	500	36.8	31.4	2.8	9.7	9.2	1.2	1.4	0.9	—N/a	1.9	0.5	3.8	0.4	34.0	5.4

== Results ==
20–21 September 2020 Venetian regional election results
Candidates	Votes	%	Seats	Parties	Votes	%	Seat
Luca Zaia	1,883,959	76.79	1	Zaia for President	916,087	44.57	23
Luca Zaia	1,883,959	76.79	1	League – Venetian League	347,832	16.92	9
Luca Zaia	1,883,959	76.79	1	Brothers of Italy	196,310	9.55	5
Luca Zaia	1,883,959	76.79	1	Forza Italia	73,244	3.56	2
Luca Zaia	1,883,959	76.79	1	Venetian Autonomy List	48,932	2.38	1
Luca Zaia	1,883,959	76.79	1	Total	1,582,405	77.00	40
Arturo Lorenzoni	385,768	15.72	1	Democratic Party	244,881	11.92	6
Arturo Lorenzoni	385,768	15.72	1	Veneto We Want	41,275	2.01	1
Arturo Lorenzoni	385,768	15.72	1	Green Europe	34,647	1.69	1
Arturo Lorenzoni	385,768	15.72	1	More Veneto in Europe – Volt	14,246	0.69	–
Arturo Lorenzoni	385,768	15.72	1	Venetian Left	2,405	0.12	–
Arturo Lorenzoni	385,768	15.72	1	Total	337,454	16.42	8
Enrico Cappelletti	79,662	3.25	–	Five Star Movement	55,281	2.69	1
Paolo Girotto	21,679	0.88	–	3V Movement	14,916	0.73	–
Antonio Guadagnini	20,502	0.84	–	Party of Venetians	19,756	0.96	–
Paolo Benvegnù	18,529	0.76	–	Solidarity Environment Work	11,846	0.58	–
Daniela Sbrollini	15,198	0.62	–	Italia Viva – PSI – PRI	12,426	0.60	–
Patrizia Bertelle	14,518	0.59	–	Veneto Ecology Solidarity	9,061	0.44	–
Simonetta Rubinato	13,703	0.56	–	Veneto for the Autonomies	12,028	0.59	–
Total candidates	2,453,518	100.00	2	Total parties	2,055,173	100.00	49
Source: Ministry of the Interior – Electoral Archive

Popular vote
Zaia	44.57%
Lega	16.92%
PD	11.92%
FdI	9.55%
FI	3.56%
M5S	2.69%
LVA	2.38%
VCV	2.01%
EV	1.69%
Others	4.71%

President
Zaia	76.79%
Lorenzoni	15.72%
Cappelletti	3.25%
Others	4.24%

Seats summary
Centre-right	82.35%
Centre-left	17.65%

=== Results by province and capital city ===
Province	Luca Zaia	Arturo Lorenzoni	Others
Belluno	75,710 77.39%	15,456 15.80%	9,663 6.81%
Padua	364,551 74.82%	88,046 18.07%	34,617 7.11%
Rovigo	88,691 76.38%	19,045 16.40%	8,377 7.22%
Treviso	351,419 79.03%	59,222 13.32%	34,052 7.65%
Venice	314,524 74.28%	71,692 16.93%	37,207 8.79%
Verona	345,384 78.41%	64,015 14.53%	31,058 6.06%
Vicenza	343,680 77.44%	68,292 15.39%	31,817 7.17%
Total	1,883,959 76.79%	385,768 15.72%	183,791 7.49%

City	Luca Zaia	Arturo Lorenzoni	Others
Belluno	11,880 69.99%	3,809 22.44%	1,284 7.57%
Padua	60,421 60.43%	32,301 32.31%	7,260 7.24%
Rovigo	17,499 70.46%	5,348 21.53%	1,990 8.01%
Treviso	27,799 68.97%	9,147 22.70%	3,358 8.33%
Venice	82,587 66.96%	29,400 23.84%	11,343 9.20%
Verona	82,193 69.78%	25,622 21.75%	9,977 8.47%
Vicenza	34,163 67.31%	12,251 24.14%	4,339 8.55%

=== Turnout ===
Region	Time			
Region	20 Sep			21 Sep
Region	12:00	19:00	23:00	15:00
Veneto	14.73%	35.55%	46.13%	61.14%
Province	Time			
Province	20 Sep			21 Sep
Province	12:00	19:00	23:00	15:00
Belluno	11.45%	26.94%	34.91%	47.84%
Padua	15.78%	38.38%	49.50%	65.43%
Rovigo	14.79%	34.73%	44.66%	59.87%
Treviso	14.07%	33.68%	44.15%	58.27%
Venice	15.27%	36.49%	46.73%	62.52%
Verona	14.59%	35.61%	46.91%	61.95%
Vicenza	14.92%	36.36%	46.98%	61.80%
Source: Ministry of the Interior – Turnout

== See also ==
- 2020 Italian regional elections
