= Party of Venetians (2019) =

Party of Venetians Partito dei Veneti
- Abbreviation: PdV
- Secretary: Cesare Busetto
- Honorary President: Stefano Zecchi
- Founded: April 2019
- Ideology: Venetian nationalism Separatism (factions); Autonomism (factions)
- Colours: Gold, red and light blue
- Chamber of Deputies: 0 / 400
- Senate: 0 / 200
- European Parliament: 0 / 76
- Regional Council of Veneto: 0 / 51

Website
- Official website

The Party of Venetians (Italian: Partito dei Veneti, PdV) is a Venetian nationalist and separatist political party in Veneto, Italy.

The PdV was originally formed in April 2019 as a coalition of political parties in order to compete in the 2020 Venetian regional election. Five parties were founding members: We Are Veneto (2.7% as Independence We Veneto in the 2015 Venetian regional election), Venetian Independence (2.5%), Chiavegato Group, Autonomous Veneto Project and Veneto State of Europe. The PdV was officially launched on 19 October 2019 during a convention in Padua, attended by 1,500 people. On the occasion, the coalition was enlarged to other groups, including Great North, Veneto First, Network 22 October, Autonomous Belluno Dolomites Region and People of Saint Mark (the latter left in February 2020).

In the run-up of the 2020 Venetian regional election, the PdV chose Guadagnini as its candidate for President of Veneto and was joined by other minor groups, notably including the faction around Riccardo Szumski (mayor of Santa Lucia di Piave). In the contextual municipal election in Venice the PdV fielded philosopher Stefano Zecchi for mayor.

In the election, which was dominated by Luca Zaia (76.8% of the vote) and Liga Veneta-sponsored lists (over 60%), the PdV won 1.0% of the vote. However, the party won 3.5% in the Venice municipal election and Zecchi was elected municipal councillor.

In January 2021 the PdV started to be re-organised as a political party, with the election of Cesare Busetto as secretary and the appointment of Zecchi as honorary president. The party aimed at holding a new congress by the end of the year.

In the run-up of the 2025 regional election the party announced that it would not participate.

== Electoral results ==
=== Regional elections ===
Election	Votes	%	Seats	+/–
2020	19,756	0.96	0 / 51	New

== Leadership ==
- Coordinator/Secretary: Giacomo Mirto (2019–2021), Cesare Busetto (2021–present)
- Honorary President: Stefano Zecchi (2021–present)
