= Forconi =

Forconi may refer to:

- Riccardo Forconi (born 1970), Italian cyclist
- Forconi Cup (organised 1942-1962), Algerian football competition named after Edmond Forconi
- Forconi (Movimento dei), name of the 2013 Italian social protests
