= Padanian Union =

The Padanian Union (Unione Padana, UP) is a Padanist and separatist political party active in Lombardy, Italy.

The party emerged in November 2011 by the merger of Lega Padana Lombardia, led by Roberto Bernardelli and Giulio Arrighini, and other groups of Padanists led by Francesco Formenti and Giovanni Ongaro. All four politicians had been deputies of Lega Lombarda–Lega Nord in the 1990s.

The first congress of the party was attended by leading Padanists such as Giancarlo Pagliarini, Gilberto Oneto, Gianluca Marchi and Leonardo Facco.

As soon as in March 2012 the provincial wing of Bergamo, led by Ongaro, split and formed the Alpine Padanian Union (UPA). In May 2013 the Padanian Union joined a new organization: Lombard Independence (Indipendenza Lombarda).

The following year, in April 2014, Bernardelli was arrested, along with a group of Venetian separatists (including Franco Rocchetta, leading members of the Venetian Most Serene Government and the European Federalist Free Entrepreneurs), for suspected crimes including criminal association for terrorism and subversion of the democratic order. Bernardelli was released on 18 April, along with Rocchetta and most of the others, as the tribunal of Brescia did not uphold the accusations.

== Leadership ==
- Secretary: Giulio Arrighini (2011–2013)
- President: Roberto Bernardelli (2011–2013)
