= Daniela Sbrollini =

Italian politician (born 1971)

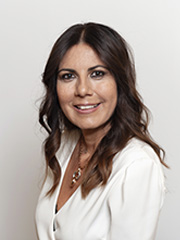
- Sbrollini in 2022

Member of the Senate
- Incumbent
- Assumed office 23 March 2018
- Constituency: Veneto

Member of the Chamber of Deputies
- In office 29 April 2008 – 23 March 2018
- Constituency: Veneto 1

Personal details
- Born: 30 September 1971 (age 54) Latiano, Italy
- Party: DS (2001-2007); PD (2007-2019); IV (since 2019)
- Occupation: Politician

Daniela Sbrollini (born 30 September 1971) is an Italian politician.

== Biography ==
Born in Latiano, Sbrollini was elected deputy at the Italian parliament in 2008 and in 2013 with the Democratic Party. In 2018, she was elected to the Italian Senate.

In 2019, she joined Italia Viva, the political party founded by Matteo Renzi.

In 2020, Sbrollini became the official candidate of Italia Viva and the Italian Socialist Party for the office of President of Veneto at the 2020 regional election, winning 0,62% of the votes.
