= 2020 Calabrian regional election =

Italian regional election

- 26 January 2020

All 31 seats to the Regional Council of Calabria
- Turnout: 44.3% (▲0.2%)
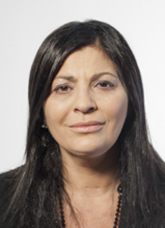

| | Majority party | Minority party |
|---|---|---|
| Candidate | Jole Santelli | Filippo Callipo |
| Party | Forza Italia | Io Resto in Calabria |
| Alliance | Centre-right | Centre-left |
| Seats won | 20 | 11 |
| Seat change | ▲9 | ▼9 |
| Popular vote | 449,705 | 245,154 |
| Percentage | 55.3% | 30.1% |
| Swing | ▲23.0% | ▼31.3% |
- Maps of the election result
President before election
Mario Oliverio
Democratic Party
Elected President
Jole Santelli
Forza Italia

The 2020 Calabrian regional election took place in Calabria, Italy, on 26 January 2020. The result was the victory of the centre-right coalition and the election of Jole Santelli as President of Calabria. The election was held concurrently with a regional election in Emilia-Romagna.

== Electoral system ==
Even if a district list is linked to a regional list that exceeds 8% of the vote, the district list must obtain at least 4% of the vote in the whole region in order to elect their own representatives. To ensure governance, the candidate who receives the most votes wins a majority bonus of 55% of the seats.

== Parties and candidates ==
| Political party or alliance | Constituent lists | Previous result | | Candidate |
| Political party or alliance | Constituent lists | Votes (%) | Seats | Candidate |
|---|---|---|---|---|
| Centre-left coalition | Democratic Party (PD) | 23.7 | 9 | Filippo Callipo |
| Centre-left coalition | Progressive Democrats (incl. Art.1) | 7.3 | 3 | Filippo Callipo |
| Centre-left coalition | Io Resto in Calabria | —N/a | —N/a | Filippo Callipo |
| Centre-right coalition | Forza Italia (FI) | 12.3 | 5 | Jole Santelli |
| Centre-right coalition | House of Freedoms (CdL) | 8.6 | 3 | Jole Santelli |
| Centre-right coalition | Brothers of Italy (FdI) | 2.5 | – | Jole Santelli |
| Centre-right coalition | Union of the Centre (UdC) | 2.7 | – | Jole Santelli |
| Centre-right coalition | League (Lega) | —N/a | —N/a | Jole Santelli |
| Centre-right coalition | Jole Santelli for President (incl. New CDU) | —N/a | —N/a | Jole Santelli |
| Aiello for President | Five Star Movement (M5S) | 4.9 | – | Francesco Aiello |
| Aiello for President | Civic Calabria | —N/a | —N/a | Francesco Aiello |
| Tansi for President | Treasure Calabria | —N/a | —N/a | Carlo Tansi |
| Tansi for President | Free Calabria | —N/a | —N/a | Carlo Tansi |
| Tansi for President | Clean Calabria | —N/a | —N/a | Carlo Tansi |

== Opinion polls ==
=== Candidates ===
| Date | Polling firm/ Client | Sample size | Callipo | Santelli | Aiello | Others | Undecided | Lead |
| 26 Jan 2020 | Opinio (exit poll) | – | 31.0–35.0 | 49.0–53.0 | 5.0–9.0 | – | – | 18.0 |
|---|---|---|---|---|---|---|---|---|
| 7 Jan 2020 | Noto | 1,000 | 34.0 | 52.0 | 10.0 | 2.0 | —N/a | 18.0 |
| 12 Dec 2019 | Noto | – | 28.0 | 45.0 | 12.0 | 15.0 | —N/a | 17.0 |

=== Parties ===
| Date | Polling firm | Sample size | Centre-left | | M5S | Centre-right | | | | Others | Undecided | Lead |
| Date | Polling firm | Sample size | PD | Other | M5S | FI | FdI | Lega | Other | Others | Undecided | Lead |
|---|---|---|---|---|---|---|---|---|---|---|---|---|
| 28 Oct 2019 | Affaritaliani.it | – | 18.5 | —N/a | 13.5 | 11.4 | 16.2 | 23.1 | —N/a | —N/a | —N/a | 4.6 |
| Sep 2019 | GPF | 600 | 18.7 | | | 28.2 | | | | – | 53.1 | 9.5 |

== Results ==
26 January 2020 Calabrian regional election results
| Candidates | Votes | % | Seats | Parties | Votes | % | Seats |
|---|---|---|---|---|---|---|---|
| Jole Santelli | 449,705 | 55.29 | 1 | Forza Italia | 96,067 | 12.34 | 5 |
| Jole Santelli | 449,705 | 55.29 | 1 | League | 95,400 | 12.25 | 4 |
| Jole Santelli | 449,705 | 55.29 | 1 | Brothers of Italy | 84,507 | 10.85 | 4 |
| Jole Santelli | 449,705 | 55.29 | 1 | Jole Santelli for President | 65,816 | 8.45 | 2 |
| Jole Santelli | 449,705 | 55.29 | 1 | Union of the Centre | 53,250 | 6.84 | 2 |
| Jole Santelli | 449,705 | 55.29 | 1 | House of Freedoms | 49,778 | 6.39 | 2 |
| Jole Santelli | 449,705 | 55.29 | 1 | Total | 444,818 | 57.13 | 19 |
| Filippo Callipo | 245,154 | 30.14 | 1 | Democratic Party | 118,249 | 15.19 | 5 |
| Filippo Callipo | 245,154 | 30.14 | 1 | Io Resto in Calabria | 61,699 | 7.92 | 3 |
| Filippo Callipo | 245,154 | 30.14 | 1 | Progressive Democrats | 47,650 | 6.12 | 2 |
| Filippo Callipo | 245,154 | 30.14 | 1 | Total | 227,598 | 29.23 | 10 |
| Francesco Aiello | 59,796 | 7.35 | – | Five Star Movement | 48,784 | 6.27 | – |
| Francesco Aiello | 59,796 | 7.35 | – | Civic Calabria | 8,544 | 1.10 | – |
| Francesco Aiello | 59,796 | 7.35 | – | Total | 57,328 | 7.36 | – |
| Carlo Tansi | 58,700 | 7.22 | – | Treasure Calabria | 40,299 | 5.18 | – |
| Carlo Tansi | 58,700 | 7.22 | – | Free Calabria | 5,329 | 0.68 | – |
| Carlo Tansi | 58,700 | 7.22 | – | Clean Calabria | 3,230 | 0.41 | – |
| Carlo Tansi | 58,700 | 7.22 | – | Total | 48,858 | 6.28 | – |
| Blank and invalid votes | 27,208 | 3.24 | | | | | |
| Total candidates | 840,563 | 100.00 | 2 | Total parties | 778,602 | 100.00 | 29 |
| Registered voters/turnout | 1,895,990 | 44.33 | | | | | |
Source: Ministry of the Interior – Election in Calabria

Popular vote
| PD | 15.19% |
| FI | 12.34% |
| Lega | 12.25% |
| FdI | 10.85% |
| Santelli | 8.45% |
| Callipo | 7.92% |
| UdC | 6.84% |
| CdL | 6.39% |
| M5S | 6.27% |
| Progressive | 6.12% |
| Tansi | 5.18% |
| Civic Calabria | 1.10% |
| Others | 1.09% |

President
| Santelli | 55.29% |
| Callipo | 30.14% |
| Aiello | 7.35% |
| Tansi | 7.22% |

=== Voter turnout ===
| Region | Time | | |
| Region | 12:00 | 19:00 | 23:00 |
|---|---|---|---|
| Calabria | 10.50% | 35.54% | 44.33% |
| Province | Time | | |
| Province | 12:00 | 19:00 | 23:00 |
| Catanzaro | 11.86% | 38.00% | 46.78% |
| Cosenza | 10.58% | 35.86% | 44.14% |
| Crotone | 9.76% | 32.17% | 39.56% |
| Reggio Calabria | 10.17% | 35.23% | 45.40% |
| Vibo Valentia | 9.06% | 33.18% | 41.35% |
Source: Ministry of the Interior – Turnout

== See also ==
- 2020 Italian regional elections
