= Liga Veneto Autonomo =

Liga Veneto Autonomo (Autonomous Veneto League, LVA) was a Venetist political party active in Veneto.

LFV was formed in early 2010 by senior members of Liga Veneta Repubblica (LVR), notably including Giorgio Vido and Bortolino Sartore, in the run up of the 2010 Venetian regional election. They disagreed with Fabrizio Comencini's decision to support Antonio De Poli of the Union of Christian and Centre Democrats (UDC) as president and wanted to support Giuseppe Bortolussi of the Democratic Party (PD) instead.

A leading member of the UDC, Antonio Guadagnini, chose to enter the new party, that received also the support of Franco Rocchetta, founder of Liga Veneta in 1978–1980. However, Guadagnini later withdrew from the race and the LVA was able to file a list only in the Province of Vicenza, where it gained 1.1% of the vote, retaining the majority of the votes LVR gained in 2005 (1.6%). In November Guadagnini finally joined Veneto State.

The party was officially founded on 18 August 2010 and Sartore was appointed spokesperson.

Five years later, the LVA participated in the 2015 regional election as part of a larger list, named Autonomous Veneto Project, in support of Alessandra Moretti of the PD. Other than the LVA, the list notably included Santino Bozza, a dissident from Liga Veneta–Lega Nord and more recently affiliated with Veneto First, and a group of splinters from Plebiscito.eu led by Gianluca Panto. In the election the list obtained 0.3% of the vote and no seats in the council.

== Leadership ==
- Spokesperson: Bortolino Sartore (2010–present)
