= 2017 Lombard autonomy referendum =

- 22 October
- Do you want the Lombardy Region, in consideration of its specialty, within the framework of the national unity, to undertake the institutional initiatives necessary to request the State the attribution of further forms and particular conditions of autonomy, with the relative resources, pursuant to and for the effects referred to in Article 116, third paragraph, of the Constitution and with reference to any legislative matter for which this procedure is admitted on the basis of the aforementioned article?
- Voting system: Simple majority

Results
Choice	Votes	%
Yes	2,875,438	96.02%
No	119,051	3.98%
Valid votes	2,994,489	99.23%
Invalid or blank votes	23,218	0.77%
Total votes	3,017,707	100.00%
Registered voters/turnout	7,897,056	38.21%

The 2017 Lombard autonomy referendum took place on 22 October in Lombardy, Italy.

The poll was not binding, but it might have consequences in terms of negotiations between the Italian government and Lombardy as the regional government will ask for more devolved powers since the "yes" won. Neighbouring Veneto also held a similar referendum on 22 October. Both President of Lombardy Roberto Maroni and President of Veneto Luca Zaia are members of Lega Nord (LN) and more specifically of Lega Lombarda and Liga Veneta, respectively. The LN is a strong proponent of federal reform, but in this case the referendums are also supported by the Five Star Movement.

== See also ==
- 2017 Venetian autonomy referendum
