= European Federalist Free Entrepreneurs =

Association of entrepreneurs

Organization logo

The European Federalist Free Entrepreneurs – Entrepreneurs' Trade Union (Liberi Imprenditori Federalisti Europei – Sindacato Imprenditori, LIFE) is an association of entrepreneurs based in Veneto, one of the regions of Italy.

The LIFE aims at representing and defending the interests of small and medium-sized businesses (which are under-represented in big-business dominated Confindustria, Italian employers' federation), and takes a libertarian stance against big government, red tape, high taxation and monopolies. Its current leader is Lucio Chiavegato, who replaced Fabio Padovan in May 2013.

The LIFE was founded in 1994 by a group of Venetist entrepreneurs (among them Fabio Padovan, Lucio Chiavegato and Diego Cancian) who were demanding fiscal federalism for Veneto, as an answer to what they called "the fiscal and bureaucratic oppression" by the Italian government, perceived as centralist and distant from the interests and the rights of the "Venetian people". In particular, they decided to organize themselves as a trade union, saying that they were the most oppressed workers in Italy.

Since its foundation, the LIFE started to evolve to be a more broadly-based association and indeed in the last years it gained strength among entrepreneurs of Lombardy, Piedmont and Friuli-Venezia Giulia. During its history it cooperated both with regionalist movements all around Northern Italy and with the free-market libertarian Bonino List and, in general, with the Italian Radicals, maintaining even a radio program at Radio Radicale.

Some LIFE members had been involved in politics, especially with Liga Veneta–Lega Nord. However many of them were soon disillusioned from it, which they perceived as too moderate and Lombardy-centred, and tried to form alternative Venetist parties. Examples include Fabio Padovan (member of the Chamber of Deputies for Lega Nord in 1992–1994, founder of Fronte Marco Polo in 2000 and founding member of Liga Fronte Veneto in 2001), Giorgio Panto (founder of North-East Project in 2004), Diego Cancian (regional councilor for North-East Project in 2005–2010) and Lucio Chiavegato (president of Veneto State in 2011–2012).

The LIFE played a leading role in the 2013 Italian social protests in Veneto.

On 2 April 2014 Chiavegato and other leading members of the LIFE were arrested, along with other Venetian separatists (including Franco Rocchetta and two members of the Venetian Most Serene Government), for suspected crimes including criminal association for terrorism and subversion of the democratic order. Chiavegato, who endured a 17-day hunger strike in jail, was released on 18 April, along with Rocchetta and others, as the tribunal of Brescia did not uphold the accusations.
