= Alpine Padanian Union =

Political party in Italy

The Alpine Padanian Union (Unione Padana Alpina, UPA) is a Padanist and separatist political party active in Lombardy, Italy.

The party emerged in March 2012 as a split from the Padanian Union (UP): the provincial section of Bergamo, led by Giovanni Ongaro, left the UP over disagreements with party leadership. The UP had been formed in November 2011 by the merger of Lega Padana Lombardia and other groups, including that of Ongaro.

Riccardo Mazzoleni and Giovanni Ongaro were respectively elected secretary and president of the newly formed party. Cristiano Forte, a former provincial secretary of Lega Lombarda–Lega Nord, was appointed deputy secretary.

== Leadership ==
- Secretary: Riccardo Mazzoleni (2012–present)
  - Deputy-Secretary: Cristiano Forte (2012–present)
- President: Giovanni Ongaro (2012–present)
