= Io Resto in Calabria =

- Leader: Filippo Callipo
- Founded: 2010
- Dissolved: 2021
- Headquarters: via Riviera Prangi 156 – Pizzo
- Ideology: Regionalism

Website
- www.iorestoincalabria.it

Io Resto in Calabria (translated I stay in Calabria, abbr. IRC) was a political association active in Calabria, Italy.

It is led by Filippo "Pippo" Callipo, entrepreneur and owner of the Callipo company, which deals with the production and marketing of tuna and other fish products. Callipo is also known for denouncing racketeering and for his commitment to the fight against the 'Ndrangheta and organized crime. He was President of Confindustria of Calabria from 2001 to 2006 and denounced the mafia techniques with a communication to the President Carlo Azeglio Ciampi.

== History ==
The association was founded in 2010 to support Pippo Callipo's candidacy in the 2010 regional elections in Calabria. Callipo, in addition to his movement, was also supported by Italy of Values and the Bonino-Pannella List. Callipo finally came third, with 10.0% of the vote, while the IRC got just 1.99% of the vote and no regional councilors.

In 2019, Callipo's candidacy for the presidency of the Calabria region is announced again, this time with the support of the centre-left coalition. In the regional elections, which took place on 26 January 2020, Callipo obtained 30.1% of the votes and was defeated by the centre-right candidate Jole Santelli. Callipo was nevertheless elected to the regional council, while IRC scored 7.9% of the votes and 3 seats.

In 2021, however, Callipo left the Regional Council saying he was nauseated by the political experience.

== Origins of the name ==
The name "Io Resto in Calabria" (translatable into I stay in Calabria or I remain in Calabria) is a slogan that takes up a sentence pronounced by Callipo after an intimidating attack against his factory in 2004.

== Electoral results ==
=== Regional elections ===
| Election | Votes | % | Seats | +/– |
|---|---|---|---|---|
| 2010 | 20,443 | 1.99 | 0 / 50 | New |
| 2020 | 61,699 | 7.92 | 3 / 31 | Steady |
