= 2017 Venetian autonomy referendum =

2017 referendum in Italy

Venetian autonomy referendum, 2017
- 22 October 2017
- Do you want further forms and special conditions of autonomy to be attributed to the Region of Veneto?
- Voting system: Simple majority

Results
| Choice | Votes | % |
|---|---|---|
| Yes | 2,273,985 | 98.10% |
| No | 43,938 | 1.90% |
| Valid votes | 2,317,923 | 99.53% |
| Invalid or blank votes | 11,037 | 0.47% |
| Total votes | 2,328,960 | 100.00% |
| Registered voters/turnout | 4,019,628 | 57.94% |

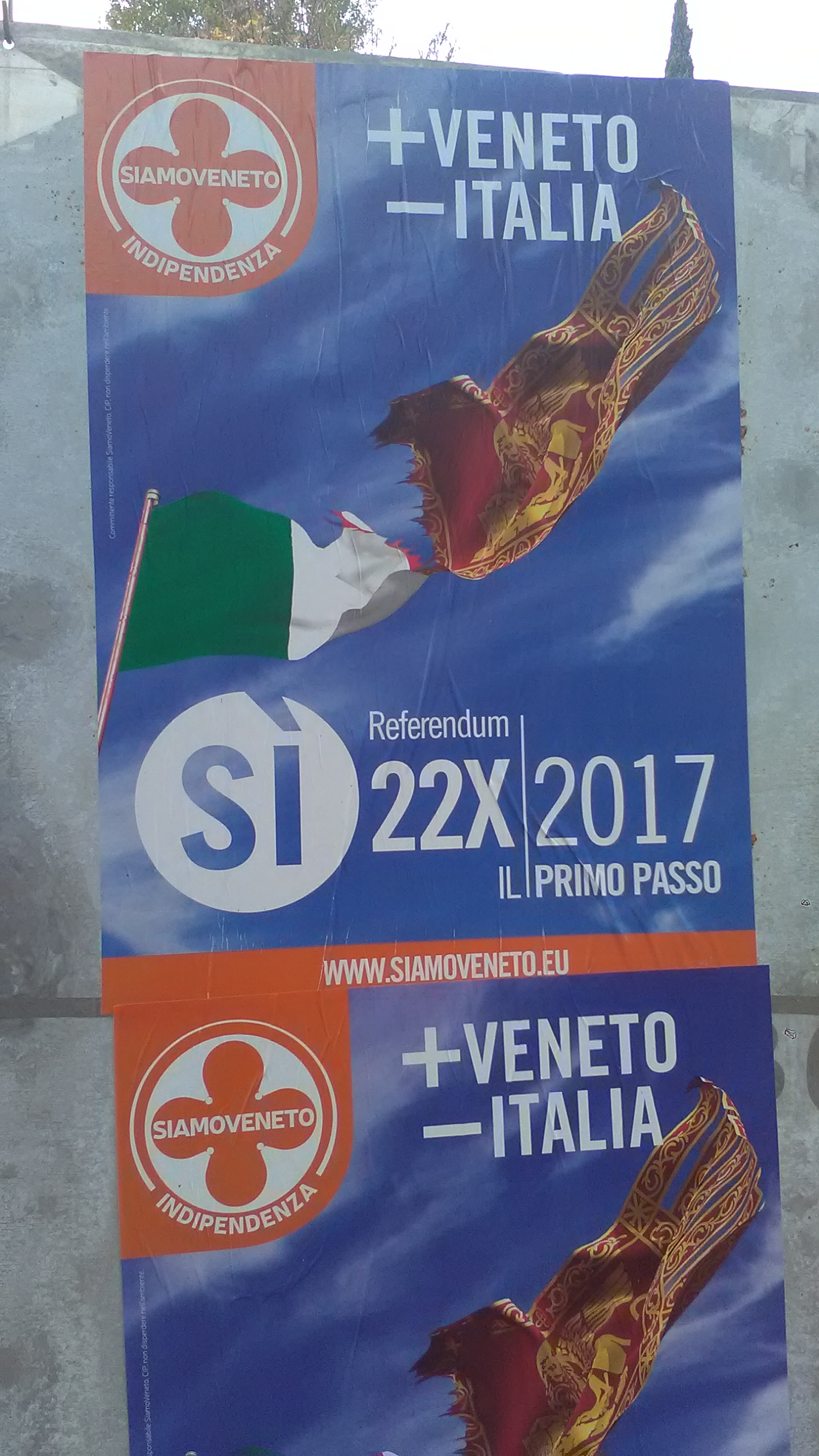
Referendum Veneto 2017

The Venetian autonomy referendum of 2017 took place on 22 October in Veneto, Italy.

The poll was not binding, but it might have consequences in terms of negotiations between the Italian government and Veneto as the regional government declared that it would ask for more devolved powers whether [if] the "yes" won. According to Mario Bertolissi, law professor and advisor to the regional government, the referendum would have "constituent power". Others considered it pointless while supporters of unitarianism in Italy counter-productive.

As expected, the "yes" vote did succeed. Turnout was 57.2% and 98.1% of participants voted "yes".

== Background ==
The referendum date was announced in April 2017 by President of Veneto Luca Zaia after decades of debates and efforts by supporters of Venetian nationalism, which rose to prominence in the 1980s–1990s. Both in 1992 and 2000, the Constitutional Court had rejected proposals for similar referendums brought forward by the Regional Council of Veneto.

In 2014, Plebiscito.eu, a minor Venetist organisation and supposedly cross-party committee, organised an online unofficial independence referendum.

Following that episode, the Region tried to hold an official one by voting a related bill. In June 2015, the Constitutional Court ruled the independence referendum out as contrary to the Constitution, but it authorised one of the five autonomy referendums proposed by the Region ("Do you want further forms and special conditions of autonomy to be attributed to the Region of Veneto?"). Lombardy, Italy's most populous region neighbouring to Veneto on the east, held a similar referendum on 22 October. Both Zaia and President of Lombardy Roberto Maroni were members of Lega Nord (LN) and more specifically of Liga Veneta and Lega Lombarda, respectively. The LN had always been a strong proponent of federal reform, but these referendums were supported also by the Five Star Movement, Forza Italia and more moderately the Democratic Party.

The Economist newspaper, which bet on the "yes" camp to prevail, also predicted that due to the perceived "anti-southern skew" of the vote the "national ambitions" of Matteo Salvini, LN federal secretary, would be negatively impacted by a resounding "yes" victory while Zaia could become the "future leader of the party". (However, Salvini not only remained party leader, but led the party to a success in the 2018 general election and was sworn in as Deputy Prime Minister in Giuseppe Conte's government.)

== See also ==
- 2014 Venetian independence referendum
- 2017 Lombard autonomy referendum
