= Renato Martin =

Italian politician

Renato Martin (Jesolo, 1963) is an Italian politician.

== Political career ==
A member of Liga Veneta–Lega Nord and close friend of Jörg Haider, Martin was elected Mayor of Jesolo in 1993 and re-elected in 1997. In 1998, when Liga Veneta split between Venetists and Padanists, Martin sided with the second group. However, after he had lost the leadership race to Gian Paolo Gobbo, he too chose to leave the party. In 1999 he thus launched Veneto Padanian Federal Republic (Veneto Repubblica Federale Padana, VRFP), a short-lived Venetist-Padanist party rooted above all in Jesolo. In 2002 Martin's list won the municipal elections there and Martin, who was not allowed to serve a third term as Mayor, was appointed Deputy-Mayor by his protégé Francesco Calzavara.

After the brief experience of VRFP, Martin joined Forza Italia as an independent and served as regional councillor in Veneto. Those who disagreed with Martin's decision to join Forza Italia formed the Party for Independent Veneto (Partito per il Veneto Indipendente) under Fabrizio Dal Col. This party was instrumental in the organization of a "referendum for self-determination" in Jesolo (on the example of Catalan independence referendums), which was celebrated in September 2009: only the 20% of voters showed up, but 97% of them voted in favour of independence.

Martin had however a troubled relationship with Forza Italia: for instance, in 2007 he tried to unseat Calzavara, who had become a full member of Forza Italia, but he lost.
