= Venetian Most Serene Government =

Venetian separatist group

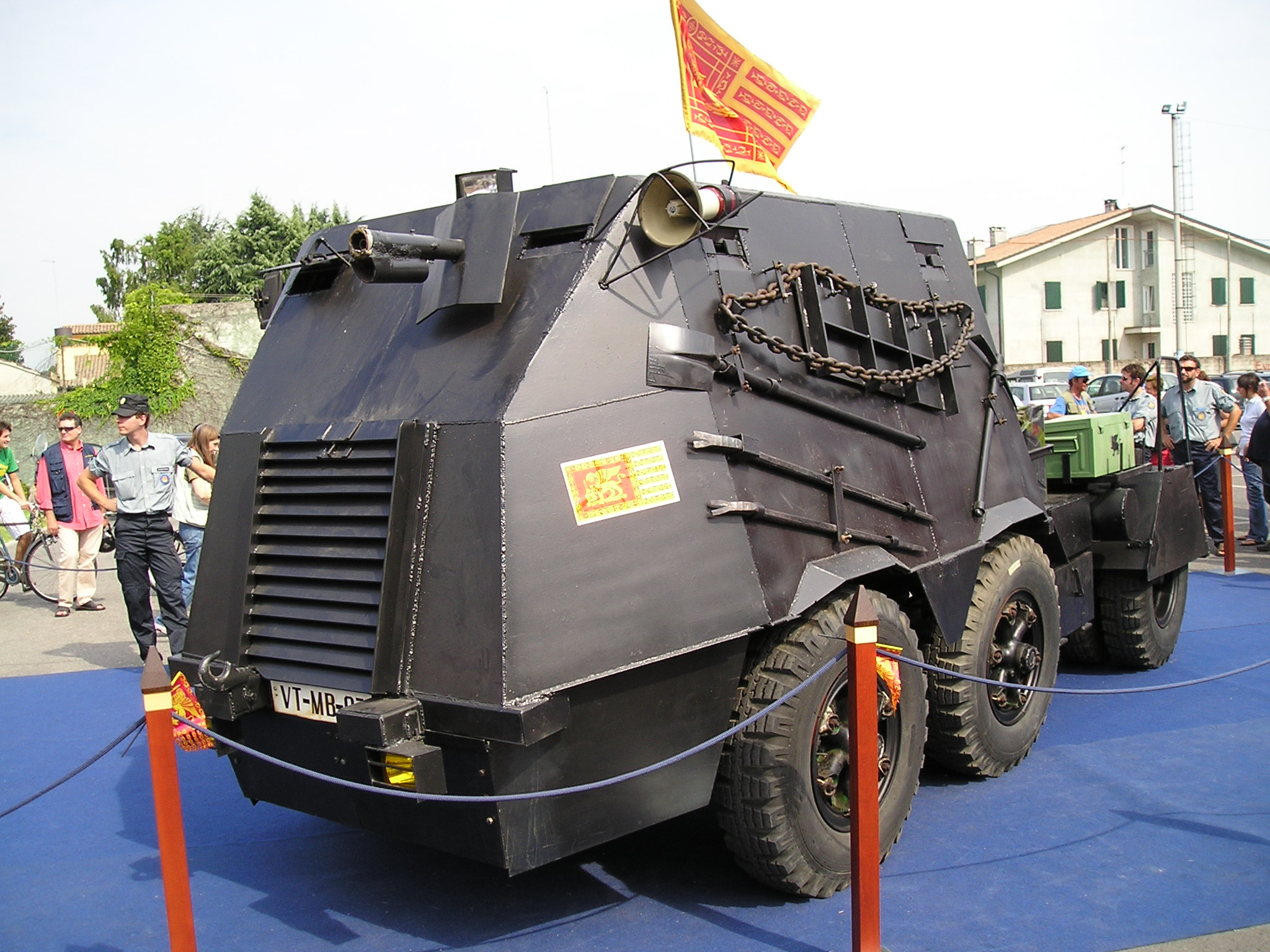
The Tanko, an armored vehicle created by modification of a truck, used by to assault the St Mark's Campanile in Venice, on 9 May 1997.

The Venetian Most Serene Government (Veneto Serenissimo Governo, VSG), whose members are often referred to as Serenissimi, is a political organization active in Veneto. The group's goal is independence and self-government for Venetian lands and it is a bulwark of Venetian nationalism.

== History ==
In the early 1980s Luigi Faccia and Flavio Contin left Liga Veneta, the mainstream regionalist party in Veneto, because they considered it too moderate. On 25 January 1987 Faccia and Contin launched the VSG. In 1992 the group was joined by Fausto Faccia, brother of Luigi, and, later, by Bepin Segato, who was appointed "ambassador" of the VSG. Since 1996 the group has repeatedly hijacked the frequencies of RAI, the Italian state-owned public service broadcaster, in Veneto with separatist proclamations in the Venetian language. This was accomplished through a variety of techniques, relying on low-power home-built transmitters, and ultimately reaching the largest impact though hiding such automatic broadcasting stations on tree-tops, with a timer to play a tape-recorded declaration on-top just of the audio signal for the 20:00 RaiUno national evening news, on March 17th 1997.

During the night between 8 and 9 May 1997 the Serenissimi took over a local ferry boat and occupied Piazza San Marco and the St Mark's Campanile in Venice in order to proclaim the "independence of Veneto" with an armed (although bloodless) demonstrative action. After eight hours, the Carabinieri stormed the Campanile and arrested the entire group. All the members of the group, including Faccia and Segato (neither of whom directly participated in the action) were arrested. The symbolic effort was criticized by Umberto Bossi and Roberto Maroni, leaders of Lega Nord, at that time proponents for the independence of Padania, while it was praised by Gianfranco Miglio, a former senator of the League who was then elected as an independent for the center-right Pole of Freedoms.

The Serenissimi attained a measure of popularity with the Venetian public and the tanko is a common exhibit at the yearly Festa dei Veneti and at other rallies, even outside of Veneto.

Segato was a candidate of Liga Veneta Repubblica in the 2001 general election and came short of election to the Italian Senate, having received 9.8% of the vote in the constituency of Schio. Representatives from most political parties in Veneto, including center-left figures, defended the Serenissimi: Claudio Rizzato of the Democrats of the Left even praised the "noble ideals" of the group, while Massimo Cacciari and Green Gianfranco Bettin campaigned for the pardon of those in jail, along with the Liga Veneta and the regional section of Forza Italia. Some of them are not embarrassed in taking part in the rally, the Festa dei Veneti, in which the tanko is displayed. More recently, leading members of the League, including Bossi and Roberto Calderoli, praised them and another leghista. Roberto Castelli, Minister of Justice in 2003, proposed a pardon for Faccia, who was still in prison, which was unsuccessful as Faccia himself refused it.

The group is still active, under the leadership of Luca Peroni, and currently campaigns for a referendum on self-determination of Veneto.

In April 2014 L. Faccia and Contin were arrested, along with several other Venetian separatists (including Franco Rocchetta and LIFE's president Lucio Chiavegato), for suspected crimes including criminal association with terrorism and subversion of the democratic order. In jail, Faccia proclaimed himself as a "war prisoner" and refused to answer questions (as Contin was in house arrest). By the end of April, most detained Venetists were released, as the tribunal of Brescia did not uphold the accusations, with the notable exceptions of Faccia and Contin, who refused to be released.

== Sources ==
- Francesco Jori, Dalla Łiga alla Lega. Storia, movimenti, protagonisti, Marsilio, Venice 2009
- Ezio Toffano, Short History of the Venetian Autonomism

== Official website ==
- Official website
