= Franco Rocchetta =

Italian politician, entrepreneur, philologist and history populariser

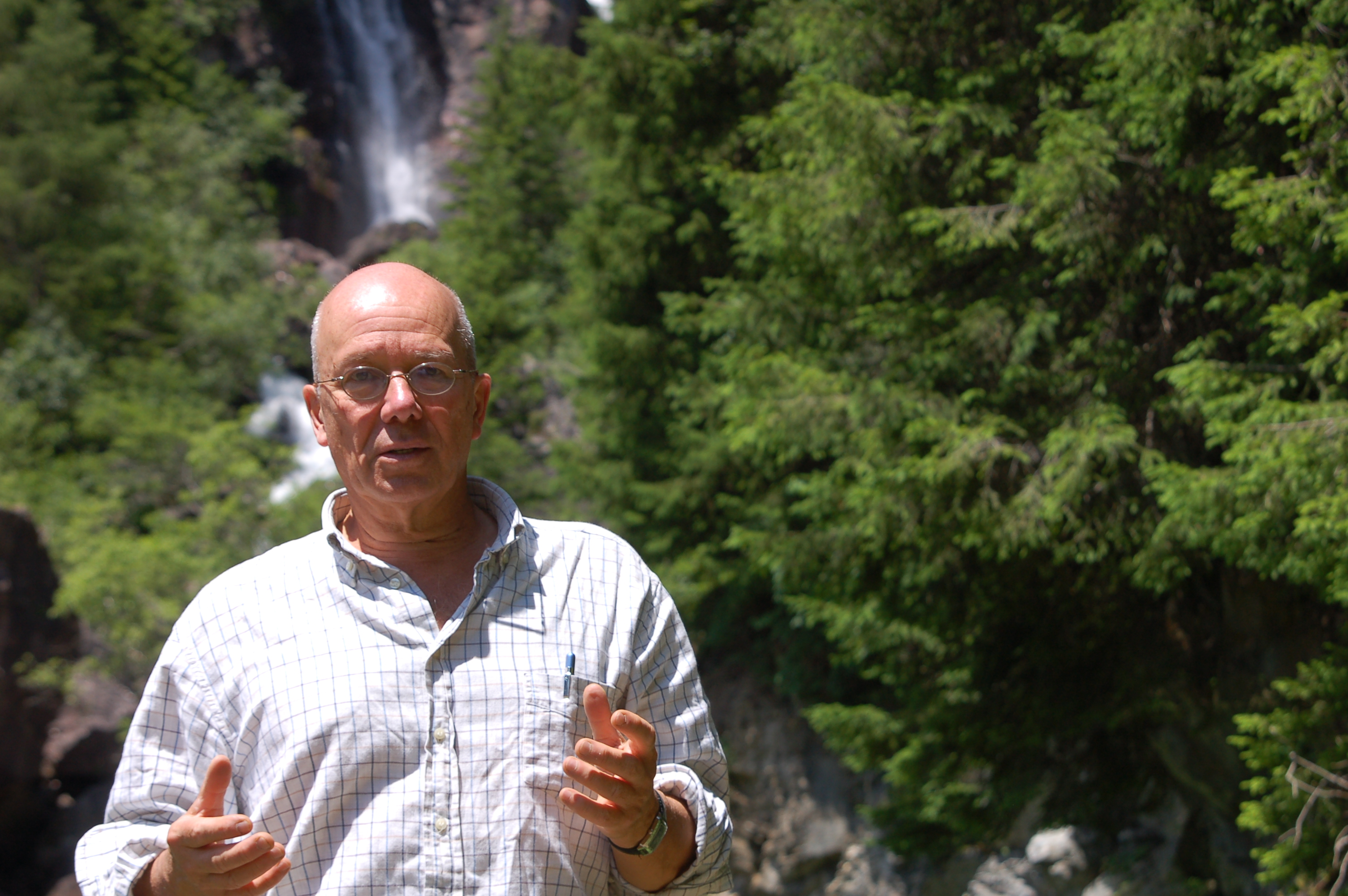
Franco Rocchetta in 2013.

Franco Rocchetta (born Venice, 12 April 1947) is an Italian politician, entrepreneur, philologist and history populariser, who is usually described as the "father" of present-day Venetian nationalism and independentism.

== Early life and political career ==
Since his university years, Rocchetta has been a Venetist, a Europeanist, and a passionate of historical, archeological and linguistic studies, and, as such, he was active in Radical and green movements. Before coming of age, he was investigated for separatist writings on walls and for his solidarity with South Tyrolean activists.

During the 1960s he was a member of the Italian Republican Party and the Italian Communist Party, which he left in order to join Lotta Continua in 1969.

In 1978 Rocchetta founded the "Venetian Philological Society" (of which he was elected president).

== Liga Veneta and Lega Nord ==
In 1980 Rocchetta, who had been a candidate in the list led by Valdostan Union in the 1979 European Parliament election, was instrumental in the foundation of Liga Veneta, whose goal was to reorganise an independent Venetian Republic within a federal Europe. Rocchetta was thus Liga Veneta's long-time national president and practical leader, having seized party's control over Achille Tramarin in 1984 and having been elected to the Regional Council of Veneto in 1985.

Having been a founding member of Lega Nord, along with Umberto Bossi, Franco Castellazzi, Giorgio Conca, Gipo Farassino, Riccardo Fragassi, Marilena Marin, Bruno Ravera, Francesco Speroni and Carla Uccelli, in 1989, Rocchetta led Liga Veneta into Lega Nord, which became a federation from a confederation, in 1991. During the party's founding federal congress, he was elected federal president, a role he would keep until 1994. In the 1992 general election he was first elected to the Chamber of Deputies and, after the 1994 general election, he joined Berlusconi I Cabinet as undersecretary of Foreign Affairs.

In July 1994, after years of juxtaposition with federal secretary Bossi on several institutional, organisational, ethnic, ethic and economic issues, Rocchetta left the party before the end of a congress in which his wife and protégé Marilena Marin was replaced by Fabrizio Comencini as national secretary. After his exit from Lega Nord, he unsuccessfully launched Liga Nathion Veneta. He later joined the Federalists and Liberal Democrats and National Alliance, prior to leaving politics.

== Post-Lega Nord activity ==
Having left the Italian Parliament following the 1996 general election, Rocchetta, while continuing to be an active spokesman for Venetian nationalism, focused on pacifism and antimilitarism. In particular, in 1999 he went to Belgrade for what he described as a "mission of peace", along with some left-wing pacifists, notably including Luca Casarini, Gianfranco Bettin and Vitaliano Della Sala. With his "Center for International Studies" dedicated to Paolo Sarpi, Rocchetta organised several initiatives with representatives of minorities, notably including those with Ibrahim Rugova in favour of a peaceful resolution of the conflict in Kosovo. In 1999 Rocchetta was instrumental in the awarding to Rugova of the honorary citizenship of Venice by then-mayor Massimo Cacciari.

Between the 1990s and the 2000s Rocchetta was honorary consul of the Republic of Macedonia in Venice.

In 2013 Rocchetta returned to active politics after virtually 20 years of absence from the political scene as a member of Plebiscite 2013, a cross-party committee which organised the 2014 referendum on Veneto's independence, which saw the participation of 63.2% of eligible voters and the support of 89.1% among them. Later on Rocchetta, along with Andrea Arman and Giovanni Dalla-Valle, distanced from the Venetist organisation over disagreements with the "Delegation of Ten".

In the 2014 centre-left primary election for selecting the candidate for President of Veneto, Rocchetta voted for Simonetta Rubinato, who lost to Alessandra Moretti.

== 2014 arrest for alleged terrorism ==
On 2 April 2014, ten days after the 2014 Venetian independence referendum was held, Rocchetta was arrested, along with a group of Venetian separatists (including leading members of the Venetian Most Serene Government and the European Federalist Free Entrepreneurs), for suspected crimes including criminal association for terrorism and subversion of the democratic order. On 18 April Rocchetta, who had declared his innocence and pacifism since the beginning, was released from prison as a tribunal in Brescia did not uphold the accusations.

== See also ==
- 2014 Venetian independence referendum
