= Enrico Cappelletti =

Italian politician (born 1968)

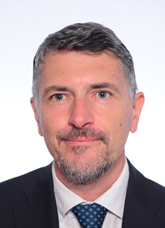
- Cappelletti in 2022

Member of the Chamber of Deputies
- Incumbent
- Assumed office 13 October 2022
- Constituency: Veneto 2 – P01

Member of the Senate
- In office 15 March 2013 – 22 March 2018
- Constituency: Veneto

Personal details
- Born: 5 February 1968 (age 58)
- Party: Five Star Movement (since 2009)

Enrico Cappelletti (born 5 February 1968) is an Italian politician serving as a member of the Chamber of Deputies since 2022. From 2013 to 2018, he was a member of the Senate.
