= Antonio Guadagnini =

Italian politician

Antonio Guadagnini (Bassano del Grappa, 25 August 1966) is an Italian politician.

Guadagnini joined Christian Democracy (DC) in the late 1980s and, after that party's dissolution in 1994, he joined a score of centre-right Christian-democratic parties, National Alliance (AN) and, finally, the Union of Christian and Centre Democrats (UDC). As UDC member and deputy-mayor of Crespano del Grappa, his hometown, he came to regional and national prominence for his request that municipalities would retain for themselves 20% of personal income tax. He was able to coalesce more than 400 mayors from all around Veneto and all political backgrounds on his proposal, which was anyway ignored by the Italian government.

In 2009 Guadagnini stood as UDC candidate for the European Parliament, but he was not elected. Increasingly marginalized within his party, he started to be interested in Venetian nationalism. Within the DC and the UDC, Guadagnini had been an ardent supporter of a Venetian centre-right party, independent from Rome, so it was a logical choice for him to join Liga Veneto Autonomo (LVA) first and, finally, Veneto State (VS). Guadagnini was soon chosen as the party's candidate for President of the Province of Treviso in the 2011 provincial election. In the election he won just 1.5% of the vote and did better in the eastern part of the province (traditionally a stronghold of Liga Veneta–Lega Nord), and especially in Crespano del Grappa (8.9%), Paderno del Grappa (5.2%), Fonte (4.9%) and Borso del Grappa (3.6%).

In October 2011, during a party congress in Vicenza, he was elected secretary of VS, succeeding to Lodovico Pizzati.

Having led the party into the Independence We Veneto (INV) coalition (in support of Luca Zaia's re-election for President) and stood as a candidate in the 2015 regional election and was elected to the Regional Council of Veneto from the provincial constituency of Vicenza. Soon after being installed, Guadagnini, who was also appointed Secretary of the Council, formed a pro-independence "inter-group", which was joined from the start by Stefano Valdegamberi, a former fellow UDC member who had been re-elected councillor in Zaia's personal list, and Massimiliano Barison of Forza Italia. In 2016 he left INV and launched We Are Veneto (SV).

Guadagnini holds two master's degrees, one in economics and one in philosophy, and is a devout Catholic.
