= Gianfranco Bettin =

Italian sociologist and green politician

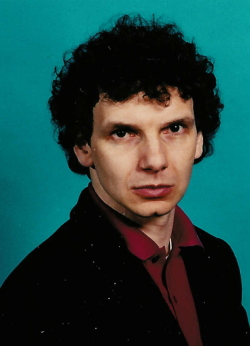
Gianfranco Bettin

Gianfranco Bettin (Venice, 21 June 1955) is an Italian sociologist and long-time leader of the Greens in Veneto.

During his long political career, he was deputy mayor of Venice for Mestre (1995–2005) and member of the Regional Council of Veneto (2000–2010). In 2003 he supported the Gianfranco Fini's proposal to have migrant citizens vote at the general national elections. Additionally, he supported the anticicipation of the full citizenship rights for migrants in the municipal and regional territory, including the administrative vote for the Deputy Major and for the Veneto Council.

In 2010 he launched IDEA – List for Veneto in order to broaden the base of Greens in Veneto, but somewhat surprisingly he was not re-elected.

In 2010 he won 35% of the vote in the centre-left primary election for mayor of Venice and barely won the nomination (the winner was Giorgio Orsoni with a mere 46% of the vote). Bettin was later a member of the municipal executive of Venice and president of the municipality of Marghera.
