= Members of the Regional Council of Veneto, 2005–2010 =

The VIII Legislature of the Regional Council of Veneto, the legislative assembly of Veneto, was inaugurated in April 2005, following the 2005 regional election, and ended in April 2010. Of the 60 members, 47 were elected in provincial constituencies with proportional representation with a further 12 returned from the so-called "regional list" of the elected President of Veneto, including the President himself, and the runner-up.

Marino Finozzi (Liga Veneta) was President of the Council for the entire term, while Giancarlo Galan (Forza Italia, later The People of Freedom) served as President of Veneto at the head of his third government.

== Composition ==
Thirteen parties were represented in the Council at the beginning of the term. They became fourteen when Massimo Carraro, the defeated candidate for President of the centre-left, resigned and was replaced by a regional deputy elected from the list of Italy of Values, thanks to an obscure clause of the electoral law.

The single largest party in the Council was Forza Italia, followed by Liga Veneta until February 2007, when the members of Democracy is Freedom – The Daisy (7 regional deputies) and the Democrats of the Left (5 regional deputies) formed a joint-group, the "Olive Tree – Venetian Democratic Party", named after the future Italian Democratic Party, which was founded later in October. It was the first time in Italy that the name of the future party was used in an institutional contest.

=== Strength of political groups ===
Distribution of Seats in the Regional Council
Political Group	Leader	2005	2010
Forza Italia	Remo Sernagiotto	16	16
The Olive Tree – Venetian Democratic Party	Giovanni Gallo	-	12
Liga Veneta–Lega Nord	Franco Manzato / Roberto Ciambetti	11	10
National Alliance	Piergiorgio Cortelazzo	6	6
Union of Christian and Centre Democrats	Onorio De Boni	5	4
Italy of Values	Damiano Rossato	-	2
North-East Project	Mariangelo Foggiato	2	1
For Veneto with Carraro	Marco Zabotti	2	1
Communist Refoundation Party	Pietrangelo Pettenò	1	1
Federation of the Greens	Gianfranco Bettin	1	1
New Italian Socialist Party	Nereo Laroni	1	1
Party of Italian Communists	Nicola Atalmi	1	1
Veneto for the European People's Party	Raffaele Grazia	-	1
Venetian Agreement	Carlo Covi	-	1
Venetian People's Movement	Francesco Piccolo	-	1
Forum of Venetians	Diego Cancian	-	1
Democracy is Freedom – The Daisy	Achille Variati	7	-
Democrats of the Left	Giovanni Gallo	5	-
Italian Democratic Socialists	Carlo Covi	1	-
United for Carraro	Massimo Carraro	1	-

Sources: Regional Council of Veneto – Groups and Regional Council of Veneto – Members

=== Members by party of election ===
==== Forza Italia ====
- Raffaele Bazzoni
- Regina Bertipaglia (elected from regional list)
- Dario Bond
- Renato Chisso
- Giancarlo Conta
- Barbara Degani (resigned on 30 June 2009)
- Giuliana Fontanella
- Elisabetta Gardini (elected from regional list; resigned on 13 July 2006)
- Giancarlo Galan (elected as president)
- Fabio Gava (resigned on 24 June 2008)
- Amedeo Gerolimetto (installed on 26 June 2008)
- Raffaele Grazia (switched to "Veneto for EPP")
- Renzo Marangon
- Renato Martin (installed on 15 July 2009)
- Vittoriano Mazzon (installed on 15 July 2009)
- Leonardo Padrin (installed on 17 March 2006)
- Clodovaldo Ruffato
- Remo Sernagiotto
- Carlo Alberto Tesserin
- Tiziano Zigiotto (elected from regional list)

==== Liga Veneta–Lega Nord ====
- Andrea Astolfi (elected from regional list; resigned on 27 July 2006)
- Luca Baggio (installed on 23 July 2009)
- Mara Bizzotto (installed on 13 July 2006, resigned on 3 August 2009)
- Gianpaolo Bottacin (elected from regional list; resigned on 10 July 2009)
- Federico Caner
- Vittorino Cenci (installed on 28 June 2007)
- Roberto Ciambetti
- Maurizio Conte
- Gianantonio Da Re (resigned on 20 July 2009)
- Marino Finozzi (elected from regional list)
- Franco Manzato (elected from regional list)
- Claudio Meggiolaro (installed on 2 September 2009)
- Sandro Sandri (resigned on 7 August 2006)
- Daniele Stival
- Flavio Tosi (resigned on 25 June 2007)
- Emilio Zamboni (installed on 14 September 2006)

==== Democracy is Freedom – The Daisy ====
(The group was merged into "The Olive Tree – Venetian Democratic Party")

- Giuseppe Berlato Sella
- Diego Bottacin
- Gustavo Franchetto (switched to "Italy of Values")
- Franco Frigo
- Igino Michieletto
- Guido Trento
- Achille Variati (resigned on 6 May 2008)

==== National Alliance ====
- Maria Luisa Coppola (elected from regional list)
- Piergiorgio Cortelazzo (elected from regional list)
- Elena Donazzan
- Massimo Giorgetti
- Moreno Teso
- Raffaele Zanon

==== Union of Christian and Centre Democrats ====
- Iles Braghetto (installed on 14 September 2006, resigned on 10 October 2006)
- Onorio De Boni
- Antonio De Poli (resigned on 20 July 2006)
- Flavio Frasson (installed on 25 October 2006)
- Francesco Piccolo (elected from regional list; switched to the "Venetian People's Movement")
- Flavio Silvestrin (elected from regional list)
- Stefano Valdegamberi

==== Democrats of the Left ====
(The group was merged into "The Olive Tree – Venetian Democratic Party")

- Carlo Alberto Azzi
- Franco Bonfante
- Giovanni Gallo
- Giampietro Marchese
- Claudio Rizzato (installed on 4 June 2008)
- Luciano Tiozzo

==== North-East Project ====
- Diego Cancian (switched to the "Forum of Venetians")
- Mariangelo Foggiato

==== For Veneto with Carraro ====
- Andrea Causin (switched to "Democracy is Freedom – The Daisy")
- Marco Zabotti

==== United for Carraro ====
- Massimo Carraro (elected as runner-up for president; resigned on 7 September 2006)

==== Communist Refoundation Party ====
- Pietrangelo Pettenò

==== Federation of the Greens ====
- Gianfranco Bettin

==== New Italian Socialist Party ====
- Nereo Laroni

==== Italian Democratic Socialists ====
- Carlo Covi (switched to "Venetian Agreement")

==== Party of Italian Communists ====
- Nicola Atalmi

==== Italy of Values ====
- Damiano Rossato (installed on 14 September 2006)

== Election ==
The regional election that produced the VIII Legislature took place on 3–4 April 2005. Giancarlo Galan (Forza Italia, House of Freedoms) was re-elected for the third time president of the region, but the support for him was diminished by the presence of a third candidate, Giorgio Panto, who picked votes both from the centre-right camp and from the Ventist one, and of a fourth candidate of the far-right.

Forza Italia suffered a decline in term of votes and regional deputies, although remaining the largest party in the council and also in the region as a whole (the Olive Tree was only an electoral alliance at the time and the three parties which were part of it formed separate groups in the council), while Venetist parties had a very good result: the combined score of Liga Veneta (14.7%), North-East Project (5.4%) and Liga Fronte Veneto (1.2%) was 21.3%, up from the 15.6% of 2000 (Liga Veneta 12.0%, Veneti d'Europa 2.4% and Fronte Marco Polo 1.2%.

3–4 April 2005 Venetian regional election results
Candidates	Votes	%	Seats	Parties	Votes	%	Seat
Giancarlo Galan	1,359,879	50.58	12				
Giancarlo Galan	1,359,879	50.58	12	Forza Italia	523,896	22.71	12
Giancarlo Galan	1,359,879	50.58	12	Northern League – Venetian League	337,896	14.65	7
Giancarlo Galan	1,359,879	50.58	12	National Alliance	186,396	8.08	4
Giancarlo Galan	1,359,879	50.58	12	Union of Christian and Centre Democrats	147,953	6.41	3
Giancarlo Galan	1,359,879	50.58	12	New Italian Socialist Party – Others	32,851	1.42	1
Giancarlo Galan	1,359,879	50.58	12	Total	1,228,992	53.28	27
Massimo Carraro	1,138,631	42.35	1				
Massimo Carraro	1,138,631	42.35	1	The Olive Tree	560,629	24.30	13
Massimo Carraro	1,138,631	42.35	1	For Veneto with Carraro	107,333	4.65	2
Massimo Carraro	1,138,631	42.35	1	Communist Refoundation Party	80,424	3.49	1
Massimo Carraro	1,138,631	42.35	1	Federation of the Greens	69,191	3.00	1
Massimo Carraro	1,138,631	42.35	1	Party of Italian Communists	35,067	1.52	1
Massimo Carraro	1,138,631	42.35	1	Italy of Values	29,607	1.28	–
Massimo Carraro	1,138,631	42.35	1	Liga Fronte Veneto	27,524	1.19	–
Massimo Carraro	1,138,631	42.35	1	Consumers' List	15,658	0.68	–
Massimo Carraro	1,138,631	42.35	1	Union of Democrats for Europe	6,265	0.27	–
Massimo Carraro	1,138,631	42.35	1	Total	931,698	40.39	18
Giorgio Panto	161,642	6.01	–	North-East Project	125,690	5.45	2
Roberto Bussinello	28,565	1.06	–	Social Alternative	20,434	0.89	–
Total candidates	2,688,717	100.00	13	Total parties	2,306,814	100.00	47
Source: Ministry of the Interior
