= Elections in Veneto =

Results of elections in Veneto, Italy

This page gathers the results of elections in Veneto.

Veneto has always been characterised by the big role played by the Catholic Church and centrist politics, but was also an early stronghold of the Radical Party and the Italian Socialist Party. In 1919, in the first election with male universal suffrage, the Catholic-inspired Italian People's Party won 42.6% of the vote and the Italian Socialist Party 36.2%. After World War II, Veneto was a stronghold of Christian Democracy, which was by far the largest party, successively won all the elections from 1946 to 1992 and continuously held the helm of the Regional Government from its establishment in 1970 to 1993. In 1994 the party was disbanded and its main successor, the new Italian People's Party, was much weaker.

In the 1980s Veneto saw the rise of Venetian nationalism and Liga Veneta, a regionalist party which was a founding member of Lega Nord in 1991. Liga Veneta almost replaced Christian Democracy in its heartlands, but was not initially able to gain regional power. In fact, since 1995, Christian Democracy's hegemony was replaced by that of the centre-right Pole/House of Freedoms coalition and especially Forza Italia, whose regional leader Giancarlo Galan was President of Veneto for 15 years. After a decline in term of votes and a resurgence, in 2010 Liga Veneta gained control of the Regional Government with Luca Zaia as President and the support of The People of Freedom, a broad centre-right party resulted from the merger of Forza Italia and National Alliance. Liga Veneta and Zaia were confirmed in 2015, with a more cohesive majority.

On 22 October 2017 an autonomy referendum took place in Veneto: 57.2% of Venetians participated and 98.1% voted "yes".

== Electoral history ==
The provincial breakdown of selected election results is shown in the tables below. In most cases, only parties above 5% are included.

1946 general election

The 1946 general election was the first after the return of democracy. Christian Democracy (DC) was by far the largest party (49.5%) and was especially strong in the provinces of Vicenza (61.1%), Padua (55.7%) and Treviso (53.5%). The Italian Socialist Party (PSI) came second (26.7%) and was stronger in the provinces of Rovigo (35.7%), Verona (33.3%) and Belluno (28.7%). The Italian Communist Party (PCI) was a distant third (13.6%), but came second in Rovigo (28.5%), where the parties of the left gained a large majority (56.5%). Rovigo, the southernmost province, was influenced by nearby "red" Emilia-Romagna, stronghold of the PCI.

Province	DC	PSI	PCI
Verona	48.8	33.3	10.5
Vicenza	61.1	24.1	8.1
Padua	55.7	23.2	12.8
Treviso	53.5	21.1	8.5
Belluno	51.7	28.7	10.1
Venice	40.3	26.2	21.1
Rovigo	28.0	35.7	28.5
Veneto	49.5	26.7	13.6

Source: Regional Council of Veneto

1948 general election

The 1948 general election was a triumph for DC, which won a thumping 60.5% throughout Veneto. The party did better in its traditional strongholds, Vicenza (71.8%), Padua (65.4%) and Treviso (64.9%). The PSI and the PCI, united in the Popular Democratic Front (FDP), won a mere 23.9% of the vote. Apart from Rovigo, where the FDP gained 48.2%, many Socialist votes went to DC and the Italian Democratic Socialist Party (PSDI), an outfit formed by those Socialists who opposed the alliance with the Communists. The PSDI garnered 10.1% of the vote at the regional level and was stronger in Belluno (15.9%), Treviso (12.6%) and Verona (10.1%).

Province	DC	PSDI	FDP
Verona	62.4	10.1	22.3
Vicenza	71.8	9.0	13.9
Padua	65.4	7.6	21.9
Treviso	64.9	12.6	15.2
Belluno	61.1	15.9	15.7
Venice	50.6	9.8	34.4
Rovigo	38.4	9.6	48.2
Veneto	60.5	10.1	23.9

Source: Regional Council of Veneto

1953 general election

In the 1953 general election DC lost some ground, however gaining a convincing 53.4% of the vote (62.2% in Vicenza, 59.9% in Treviso and 59.6% in Padua). The PSI and the PCI ran separate lists, gaining 14.6 and 14.2% of the vote. Veneto was thus one of the few regions of Italy where the Socialists were stronger than the PCI, even without counting the PSDI (5.6%). The PSI got its best results in the provinces of Venice (21.6%), Rovigo (19.8%) and Verona (18.2%), but not in the traditional Socialist stronghold of Belluno, where it was passed by the PSDI (12.3 against 11.0%). The PCI was stronger in Rovigo (28.2%) and Venice (19.7%).

Province	DC	PSDI	PSI	PCI
Verona	53.4	4.7	18.2	10.8
Vicenza	62.2	4.4	9.2	9.4
Padua	59.6	4.0	11.1	14.2
Treviso	59.9	8.0	11.9	8.6
Belluno	53.7	12.3	11.3	11.6
Venice	43.2	6.0	21.6	19.7
Rovigo	39.6	4.6	19.8	28.2
Veneto	53.4	5.6	14.6	14.2

Source: Regional Council of Veneto

1970 regional election

Election results were quite stable for four decades. In the 1970 regional election, the first after the establishment of Veneto as a Region, DC was by far the largest party with 51.8%. As usual, its strongholds included the provinces of Vicenza (64.2%), Padua (56.3%) and Treviso (56.0%). Up to that time the PCI had passed the PSI as second largest party: in 1970 the former garnered 16.8%, the second 10.4% and the PSDI 7.6%. Rovigo was the most left-wing province (the sum of PCI and PSI was 42.3%), followed by Venice (39.2%), and Belluno the most Socialist one (the sum of PSDI and PSI was 27.9%), followed by Treviso (20.6%).

Province	DC	PSDI	PSI	PCI
Verona	52.7	7.4	11.7	14.0
Vicenza	64.2	6.4	8.4	9.1
Padua	56.3	6.3	7.2	16.3
Treviso	56.0	10.0	10.6	11.3
Belluno	46.9	13.9	14.0	13.0
Venice	38.4	6.7	12.6	26.6
Rovigo	41.0	6.9	10.5	31.8
Veneto	51.8	7.6	10.4	16.8

Source: Regional Council of Veneto

1990 regional election

Since 1980 DC experienced a steady decline in term of votes, largely due to the rise of Liga Veneta (LV) and other Venetist parties. In the 1990 regional election DC was still the largest party of Veneto (42.4%), but suffered the competition of the LV in its heartlands. Venetist parties were fairly strong in Vicenza (11.4%) and Verona (10.8%), while the PSI and the PCI retained their strongholds (Belluno with 23.8% and Rovigo with 29.0%, respectively). Both Rovigo and Venice had PCI–PSI majorities.

Province	DC	LV*	PSI	PCI
Verona	44.3	10.8	14.2	11.5
Vicenza	49.1	11.4	10.1	8.6
Padua	46.1	6.4	10.7	16.3
Treviso	44.5	7.8	14.1	12.1
Belluno	39.3	7.0	23.8	13.1
Venice	31.7	4.9	15.9	24.2
Rovigo	35.2	3.3	15.5	29.0
Veneto	42.3	7.8	13.7	15.5

* = Including UPV
Source: Regional Council of Veneto.

1992 general election

The 1992 general election was a realigning one in Italy, due to the rise of Lega Nord, a federation of northern regionalist parties of which the LV was a founding member. The realignment was especially visible in Veneto where DC, though still being the largest party, lost almost a third of its voters between 1990 and 1992, stopping at 31.5%. The LV gained ground in the Pedemontana, that is to say the provinces at the feet of the mountains, most of which had long been DC's heartlands: 21.5% in Treviso, 20.6% in Verona and 19.5% in Vicenza. In Belluno the LV became the largest party with 27.8%, by reducing the vote of DC and halving that of the PSI. The total score of Venetist parties was 31.8% in Vicenza, 29.3% in Treviso, 27.2% in Verona and 22.9% in Padua. The PDS got just 9.9% regionally, fairly less than the PCI in 1990.

Province	DC	LV	Ven.	PSI	PDS
Verona	34.0	20.6	6.6	11.1	7.1
Vicenza	34.3	19.5	12.3	7.9	5.6
Padua	34.5	14.8	8.1	9.3	10.5
Treviso	32.9	21.5	7.8	9.7	7.5
Belluno	27.4	27.8	-	14.3	8.0
Venice	23.8	13.4	6.6	13.0	16.2
Rovigo	29.5	8.5	6.1	14.1	18.1
Veneto	31.5	17.8	7.7	10.6	9.9

Ven. = Other Venetists, including LAV, UPV and MVRA.
Source: Regional Council of Veneto

1994 general election

The 1994 general election marked a full-scale realignment in Venetian electoral politics. In 1993–1994 the Tangentopoli scandals led to the disappearance of the main government parties, including DC and the PSI, while the PCI was transformed into the Democratic Party of the Left (PDS). The DC successor, the Italian People's Party (PPI), was not able to retain the votes of its predecessor, which were largely absorbed by the LV and Forza Italia, the new party launched by entrepreneur Silvio Berlusconi.

In a highly fragmented party system, FI came first with 23.6%, the LV second with 21.6% and the PPI (along with Patto Segni, a small centrist ally) third with 20.2%. Curiously enough FI was stronger in a centre-left province, Venice (26.7%), while the LV did better in Belluno (32.4%) and in formerly DC's heartlands, Treviso (28.5%) and Vicenza (28.1%). In Padua the PPI and Patto Segni got 23.7% together, slightly behind FI (24.1%). The PCI slightly improved its performance to 12.1%. Under the new voting system, the FI–LV coalition won 37 seats out of 50 for the Chamber (36 out of 37 in single-seat districts).

Province	AN	FI	LV	PPI*	PDS
Verona	10.2	23.6	20.7	22.4	9.1
Vicenza	6.4	21.6	28.1	23.6	7.2
Padua	8.2	24.1	17.2	23.7	12.7
Treviso	6.8	22.2	28.5	18.3	9.7
Belluno	7.1	21.6	32.4	15.7	9.3
Venice	6.8	26.7	15.4	14.4	19.2
Rovigo	8.6	23.2	10.4	20.6	20.9
Veneto	7.7	23.6	21.6	20.2	12.1

* = Including Patto Segni.
Source: Regional Council of Veneto

1996 general election

The 1996 general election saw a huge success of the LV, which was by far the largest party with 29.2%. As usual, the party was especially strong in the mountains and the Pedemontana: Belluno (41.4%), Treviso (41.4%), Vicenza (36.1%) and Verona (25.7%). FI was a distant second with 17.1%, the PDS third with 11.8%, National Alliance (AN) fourth with 11.7% and the PPI fifth with 8.1%. The PDS was the largest party in Rovigo (21.3%), while AN proved particularly strong in Verona (14.7%), Padua (13.7%) and Rovigo (13.7%). Padua was the province where the PPI scored better (9.6%).

Province	AN	FI	LV	PPI	PDS
Verona	14.7	17.3	25.7	8.7	9.8
Vicenza	10.0	14.1	36.1	9.0	7.3
Padua	13.7	16.5	23.6	9.6	12.4
Treviso	9.1	16.7	41.9	7.5	8.7
Belluno	7.9	18.9	41.4	6.0	7.8
Venice	10.9	19.8	22.2	6.2	18.3
Rovigo	13.7	17.6	13.2	8.2	21.3
Veneto	11.7	17.1	29.2	8.1	11.8

Source: Regional Council of Veneto

2000 regional election

The 2000 regional election was the heyday for FI, which replaced the LV as Veneto's largest party with 30.4% and did particularly well in Vicenza (31.8%), Belluno (31.7%) and Verona (31.4%). The LV got a poor 12.0%, due to some damaging splits and a big swing of Venetist votes to FI. A centrist federation, including the PPI, gained 13.6%, the Democrats of the Left (DS) 12.3%, AN 9.8% and the Christian democrats (CDU and CCD) 6.8%.

Province	AN	FI	CDU*	LV	IpV	DS
Verona	11.6	31.4	8.7	12.2	12.5	9.6
Vicenza	9.4	31.8	6.2	15.5	14.8	8.4
Padua	10.2	30.9	8.8	8.6	14.0	13.8
Treviso	8.7	27.9	6.2	19.5	15.0	8.7
Belluno	7.9	31.7	-	11.6	21.2	10.3
Venice	8.7	30.2	5.7	7.1	11.4	18.8
Rovigo	12.4	27.8	6.1	4.7	9.3	21.1
Veneto	9.8	30.4	6.8	12.0	13.6	12.3

* = Including CCD.
Source: Regional Council of Veneto

2005 regional election

The 2005 regional election saw a comeback of Venetist parties: the LV won 14.7% of the vote, while brand new North-East Project got 5.5%. Both were especially strong in Treviso, which proved again to be a Venetist stronghold: 23.1 and 15.6%, respectively. FI was reduced to 22.7% and was no longer Veneto's largest party, as it was passed by The Olive Tree (including the DS and the successor of the PPI, DL) and its allies, which got 29.0% regionally. AN gained 8.1% and the Union of Christian and Centre Democrats (UDC), resulted from the merger of CDU and CCD, 6.4%. Padua was again the province were post-DC parties did better: FI 25.3% and UDC 9.2%.

Province	AN	FI	LV	PNE	UDC	Uli.*
Verona	10.7	23.1	16.9	0.8	8.3	27.2
Vicenza	8.7	23.7	17.9	4.3	6.9	26.8
Padua	7.9	25.3	10.3	3.6	9.2	30.9
Treviso	4.9	18.3	23.1	15.6	3.8	24.6
Belluno	5.9	19.4	11.8	7.2	3.8	36.7
Venice	7.0	24.0	8.4	4.2	4.6	30.7
Rovigo	12.5	22.1	6.1	1.2	5.2	37.6
Veneto	8.1	22.7	14.7	5.5	6.4	29.0

* = Including For Veneto with Carraro.
Source: Regional Council of Veneto

2010 regional election

The 2010 regional election concluded a realignment started with the 2008 general election, under which the LV returned to be Veneto's largest party. With 35.2% of the votes it was also the first party in two decades to gain more than 30%. The party got a thumping 48.5% in Treviso, 38.1% in Vicenza, 36.1% in Verona, 32.8% in Belluno and 31.4% in Padua. In these five provinces the LV was by far the largest party. The People of Freedom (PdL), result of the merger of FI with AN, came second with 24.7% and the Democratic Party (PD), result of the merger of the DS with DL, third with 20.3%.

Province	PdL	LV	IdV	PD
Verona	27.6	36.1	5.1	16.9
Vicenza	25.3	38.1	4.3	17.8
Padua	25.7	31.4	5.8	20.4
Treviso	15.6	48.5	5.5	18.2
Belluno	26.6	32.8	4.4	23.5
Venice	26.3	26.1	6.3	26.7
Rovigo	32.9	22.7	5.0	25.4
Veneto	24.7	35.2	5.3	20.3

Source: Regional Council of Veneto

2013 general election

The 2013 general election saw the rise of the Five Star Movement (M5S), a protest party which attracted disillusioned voters from all the major parties, in Veneto especially from the LV. In a very fragmented political landscape. M5S won 26.3% in the region, ahead of the PD (21.3%), the PdL (18.7%), the LV (10.5%) and Civic Choice (SC, 10.1%). The future will tell whether the 2013 election has constituted a realigning election or just a deviating one.

Province	PdL	LV	M5S	SC	PD
Verona	19.9	13.7	24.5	10.1	18.4
Vicenza	17.1	12.4	25.4	10.7	19.4
Padua	20.2	8.1	26.7	9.7	21.4
Treviso	17.9	13.3	26.3	10.6	19.8
Belluno	15.4	10.6	25.1	13.3	24.5
Venice	18.1	6.6	29.2	9.1	25.5
Rovigo	20.9	6.0	26.3	8.5	26.7
Veneto	18.7	10.5	26.3	10.1	21.3

Source: Regional Council of Veneto

2015 regional election

The 2015 regional election was a triumph for the LV, which obtained an unprecedented 40.9% of the vote (combined result of official party list and President Luca Zaia's personal list, 17.8% and 23.1%, respectively). The LV, which was the first party in 25 years to get more than 40% of the vote, was stronger in Treviso, where it gained a landslide 53.8% of the vote. The PD won 20.5% (combined result of official party list and Alessandra Moretti's personal list, 16.7% and 3.8%, respectively), the Tosi List for Veneto, a splinter group from the LV, 7.1% (combined results of two lists named after Flavio Tosi, 5.7% and 1.4%, respectively), Venetist parties, notably including Independence We Veneto (2.7%) and Venetian Independence (2.5%), 6.3%, and Forza Italia, the latest reincarnation of FI/PdL, a mere 6.0%.

Province	FI	LTV	LV	Ven.	M5S	PD
Verona	8.4	20.0	28.3	4.7	10.7	19.8
Vicenza	5.5	3.8	45.4	7.8	9.2	18.1
Padua	5.7	4.9	42.4	6.0	11.2	20.4
Treviso	4.0	3.4	53.8	7.2	8.3	17.4
Belluno	4.5	7.4	35.8	7.3	9.4	23.6
Venice	5.8	3.6	37.9	6.0	12.8	24.3
Rovigo	8.5	7.0	32.9	5.3	10.7	27.1
Veneto	6.0	7.1	40.9	6.3	10.4	20.5

Ven. = Other Venetists, including INV, IV, UNE, PVA and VSC.
Source: Regional Council of Veneto

2020 regional election

The 2020 regional election was a triumph for the LV, which obtained an unprecedented 61.5% of the vote (combined result of official party list and President Luca Zaia's personal list, 16.9% and 44.6%, respectively). The LV, which was the most voted party in the history of Veneto, was stronger in Treviso, where it gained a landslide 68.6% of the vote. The PD won 11.9%, the Brothers of Italy, reincarnation of AN, 9.6%, FI 3.6% and the M5S 2.7%.

Province	FdI	FI	LV	Ven.	M5S	PD
Verona	15.6	4.2	55.5	4.6	3.0	11.4
Vicenza	10.8	1.7	62.2	4.3	2.2	11.1
Padua	7.9	6.0	59.8	3.6	2.7	11.7
Treviso	6.7	1.8	68.6	5.0	2.0	10.8
Belluno	8.1	3.2	64.1	3.6	2.2	12.9
Venice	6.8	3.7	61.7	3.2	3.7	14.1
Rovigo	11.2	4.3	58.6	2.4	2.9	13.7
Veneto	9.6	3.6	61.5	4.1	2.7	11.9

Ven. = Other Venetists, including LVA, PdV, VpA and SV.
Source: Regional Council of Veneto

2025 regional election

In the 2025 regional election, Zaia's personal list did not compete, due to coalition agreements with FdI, however the LV came anyway largely first with 36.3%, outperforming its junior ally, which stopped at 18.7%, as well as the PD (16.6%) and FI (6.3%). Other lists included the new Resist Veneto (RV), which came fifth with 5.0%, the Greens and Left Alliance (4.6%) and the M5S (2.2%). Both the LV and RV, the two main Venetist parties, were stronger in the province of Treviso (40.8% and 10.2%, respectively).

Province	FdI	FI	LV	Ven.	M5S	PD	AVS
Verona	21.8	10.1	34.7	5.0	2.3	16.1	3.4
Vicenza	18.5	6.2	38.7	6.1	1.8	14.6	6.8
Padua	17.6	6.1	35.5	6.2	2.3	18.1	5.0
Treviso	14.9	4.9	40.8	12.3	1.7	12.5	3.9
Belluno	27.7	3.2	27.3	8.6	1.8	18.9	4.6
Venice	17.8	5.0	33.2	6.6	3.1	22.1	4.3
Rovigo	22.3	5.1	36.6	4.4	2.7	15.8	4.0
Veneto	18.7	6.3	36.3	7.2	2.2	16.6	4.6

Ven. = Other Venetists, including RV, LVR and PpV.
Source: Regional Council of Veneto

== Regional elections ==
The President of Veneto is elected directly by the people every five years. Also the Regional Council is elected every five years, but, if the President suffers a vote of no confidence, resigns or dies, the Council is dissolved and fresh elections are called. The Council is composed of 51 members, of which 49 are elected in provincial constituencies with proportional representation, while the remaining two are the elected President and the candidate for President who comes second.

=== Latest regional election ===
The latest regional election took place on 23–24 November 2025.

Alberto Stefani of Liga Veneta–Lega (formerly Lega Nord) was elected President by a landslide 64.4% of the vote, with his main rival Giovanni Manildo and Riccardo Szumski obtaining 28.9% and 5.1%, respectively. Liga Veneta was confirmed the largest in the region with 36.3% of the vote, while the combined score of Venetian nationalist and/or regional parties was 45.0%. Brothers of Italy came second with 18.7% and the Democratic Party third with 16.6%. The outgoing and term-limited president, Luca Zaia, who had been elected for this third term in 2020 with a record-breaking 76.8% of the vote, headed the electoral slates of Liga Veneta in all seven provinces and obtained 203,054 (write-in) preferences, the all-time record in Italian regional elections.

23–24 November 2025 Venetian regional election results
Candidates	Votes	%	Seats	Parties	Votes	%	Seats
Alberto Stefani	1,211,356	64.39	1	League – Liga Veneta	607,220	36.28	19
Alberto Stefani	1,211,356	64.39	1	Brothers of Italy	312,839	18.69	9
Alberto Stefani	1,211,356	64.39	1	Forza Italia	105,375	6.30	3
Alberto Stefani	1,211,356	64.39	1	Liga Veneta Repubblica	30,703	1.83	1
Alberto Stefani	1,211,356	64.39	1	Union of the Centre	28,109	1.68	1
Alberto Stefani	1,211,356	64.39	1	Us Moderates	18,768	1.12	0
Alberto Stefani	1,211,356	64.39	1	Total	1,103,014	65.90	33
Giovanni Manildo	543,278	28.88	1	Democratic Party	277,945	16.60	9
Giovanni Manildo	543,278	28.88	1	Greens and Left Alliance	77,621	4.64	2
Giovanni Manildo	543,278	28.88	1	Five Star Movement	36,866	2.20	1
Giovanni Manildo	543,278	28.88	1	United for Manildo	35,669	2.13	1
Giovanni Manildo	543,278	28.88	1	The Venetian Civics	24,926	1.49	1
Giovanni Manildo	543,278	28.88	1	Peace Health Work	10,430	0.62	0
Giovanni Manildo	543,278	28.88	1	Volt	5,339	0.32	0
Giovanni Manildo	543,278	28.88	1	Total	468,796	28.01	14
Riccardo Szumski	96,474	5.13	0	Resist Veneto	83,054	4.96	2
Marco Rizzo	20,574	1.09	0	Sovereign Popular Democracy	12,941	0.77	0
Fabio Bui	9,590	0.51	0	Populars for Veneto	6,071	0.36	0
Blank and invalid votes	36,305	1.89					
Total candidates	1,881,272	100.0	2	Total parties	1,673,876	100.0	49
Registered voters/turnout	1,917,577	44.65					
Source: Veneto Region – Results

=== List of previous regional elections ===
- 1970 Venetian regional election
- 1975 Venetian regional election
- 1980 Venetian regional election
- 1985 Venetian regional election
- 1990 Venetian regional election
- 1995 Venetian regional election
- 2000 Venetian regional election
- 2005 Venetian regional election
- 2010 Venetian regional election
- 2015 Venetian regional election
- 2020 Venetian regional election

== Italian general elections ==
=== Latest general election ===
The centre-right coalition (56.3%), this time dominated by the Brothers of Italy, obtained a far larger victory than four years before over the centre-left coalition (23.0%), Action – Italia Viva (8.4%) and the Five Star Movement (5.8%). One third of deputies and senators were elected in single-seat constituencies and, as in 2018, the centre-right won all such constituencies. Among parties, the Brothers of Italy came largely first with 32.7% of the vote, followed by the Democratic Party (16.3%) and Lega (14.5%). The biggest turnaround happened within the centre-right, as Lega lost more than half of the votes obtained in 2018 (–17.7pp) and the Brothers of Italy jumped from 4.2% to virtually eight times that share (+28.5pp).

Chamber of Deputies

Coalition	Party	Proportional			First-past-the-post			Total seats
Coalition	Party	Votes	%	Seats	Votes	%	Seats	Total seats
Centre-right coalition	Brothers of Italy	821,583	32.7	7	1,413,108	56.3	5	12
Centre-right coalition	Lega (incl. Liga Veneta)	365,190	14.5	3	1,413,108	56.3	6	9
Centre-right coalition	Forza Italia	175,057	7.0	2	1,413,108	56.3	–	2
Centre-right coalition	Us Moderates	51,278	2.0	–	1,413,108	56.3	1	1
Centre-right coalition				12			12	24
Centre-left coalition	Democratic Party	409,001	16.3	4	578,406	23.0	–	4
Centre-left coalition	Greens and Left Alliance	83,426	3.3	1	578,406	23.0	–	1
Centre-left coalition	More Europe	77,238	3.1	–	578,406	23.0	–	–
Centre-left coalition	Civic Commitment	8,741	0.3	–	578,406	23.0	–	–
Centre-left coalition				5			–	5
Action – Italia Viva		210,720	8.4	2	210,720	8.4	–	2
Five Star Movement		146,319	5.8	1	146,319	5.8	–	1
Italexit		62,557	2.5	–	62,557	2.5	–	–
Vita		44,430	1.8	–	44,430	1.8	–	–
Sovereign and Popular Italy		27,853	1.1	–	27,853	1.1	–	–
People's Union		24,724	1.0	–	24,724	1.0	–	–
Alternative for Italy		3,674	0.1	–	3,674	0.1	–	–
Total		2,511,881	100.0	20	2,511,881	100.0	12	32

Sources: Regional Council of Veneto, Ministry of the Interior, Ministry of the Interior and Corriere della Sera

Senate

Coalition	Party	Proportional			First-past-the-post			Total seats
Coalition	Party	Votes	%	Seats	Votes	%	Seats	Total seats
Centre-right coalition	Brothers of Italy	817,771	32.6	3	1,410,353	56.2	2	5
Centre-right coalition	Lega (incl. Liga Veneta)	366,266	14.6	2	1,410,353	56.2	2	4
Centre-right coalition	Forza Italia	174,377	7.0	1	1,410,353	56.2	1	2
Centre-right coalition	Us Moderates	51,939	2.1	–	1,410,353	56.2	–	–
Centre-right coalition				6			5	11
Centre-left coalition	Democratic Party	404,957	16.1	2	582,005	23.2	–	2
Centre-left coalition	Greens and Left Alliance	87,476	3.5	1	582,005	23.2	–	1
Centre-left coalition	More Europe	81,708	3.3	–	582,005	23.2	–	–
Centre-left coalition	Civic Commitment	7,864	0.3	–	582,005	23.2	–	–
Centre-left coalition				3			–	3
Action – Italia Viva		210,033	8.4	1	210,033	8.4	–	1
Five Star Movement		145,545	5.8	1	145,545	5.8	–	1
Italexit		61,777	2.5	–	61,777	2.5	–	–
Vita		42,537	1.7	–	42,537	1.7	–	–
Sovereign and Popular Italy		26,627	1.1	–	26,627	1.1	–	–
People's Union		23,303	0.9	–	23,303	0.9	–	–
Alternative for Italy		8,604	0.3	–	8,604	0.3	–	–
Total		2,510,784	100.0	11	2,510,784	100.0	5	16

Sources: Regional Council of Veneto, Ministry of the Interior and Corriere della Sera

=== List of previous general elections ===
- 1946 Italian general election in Veneto
- 1948 Italian general election in Veneto
- 1953 Italian general election in Veneto
- 1958 Italian general election in Veneto
- 1963 Italian general election in Veneto
- 1968 Italian general election in Veneto
- 1972 Italian general election in Veneto
- 1976 Italian general election in Veneto
- 1979 Italian general election in Veneto
- 1983 Italian general election in Veneto
- 1987 Italian general election in Veneto
- 1992 Italian general election in Veneto
- 1994 Italian general election in Veneto
- 1996 Italian general election in Veneto
- 2001 Italian general election in Veneto
- 2006 Italian general election in Veneto
- 2008 Italian general election in Veneto
- 2013 Italian general election in Veneto
- 2018 Italian general election in Veneto

== European Parliament elections ==
=== Latest EP election ===
The European Parliament election of 2024 took place in Veneto, as well as the rest of Italy, on 8–9 June 2024. In a huge reversal from the previous election in 2019, the Brothers of Italy came first with 37.6% of the vote, followed by the Democratic Party (18.9%) and the League (13.2%), represented by the Venetian League in the region.

Party	Votes	%
Brothers of Italy	774,624	37.6
Democratic Party	389,053	18.9
Lega	271,142	13.2
Forza Italia–Us Moderates	176,891	8.6
Greens and Left Alliance	125,487	6.1
Five Star Movement	99,866	4.8
Action	84,580	4.1
United States of Europe	65,992	3.2
Peace Land Dignity	41,868	2.0
Freedom	17,635	0.9
South Tyrolean People's Party	7,418	0.4
Popular Alternative	6,632	0.3
Total	2,061,188	100.00

Source: Ministry of the Interior

=== List of previous EP elections ===
- 1979 European Parliament election in Veneto
- 1984 European Parliament election in Veneto
- 1989 European Parliament election in Veneto
- 1994 European Parliament election in Veneto
- 1999 European Parliament election in Veneto
- 2004 European Parliament election in Veneto
- 2009 European Parliament election in Veneto
- 2014 European Parliament election in Veneto
- 2019 European Parliament election in Veneto
