= 2005 Venetian regional election =

Italian regional election

- 3–4 April 2005

All 60 seats to the Regional Council
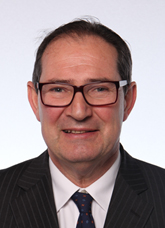

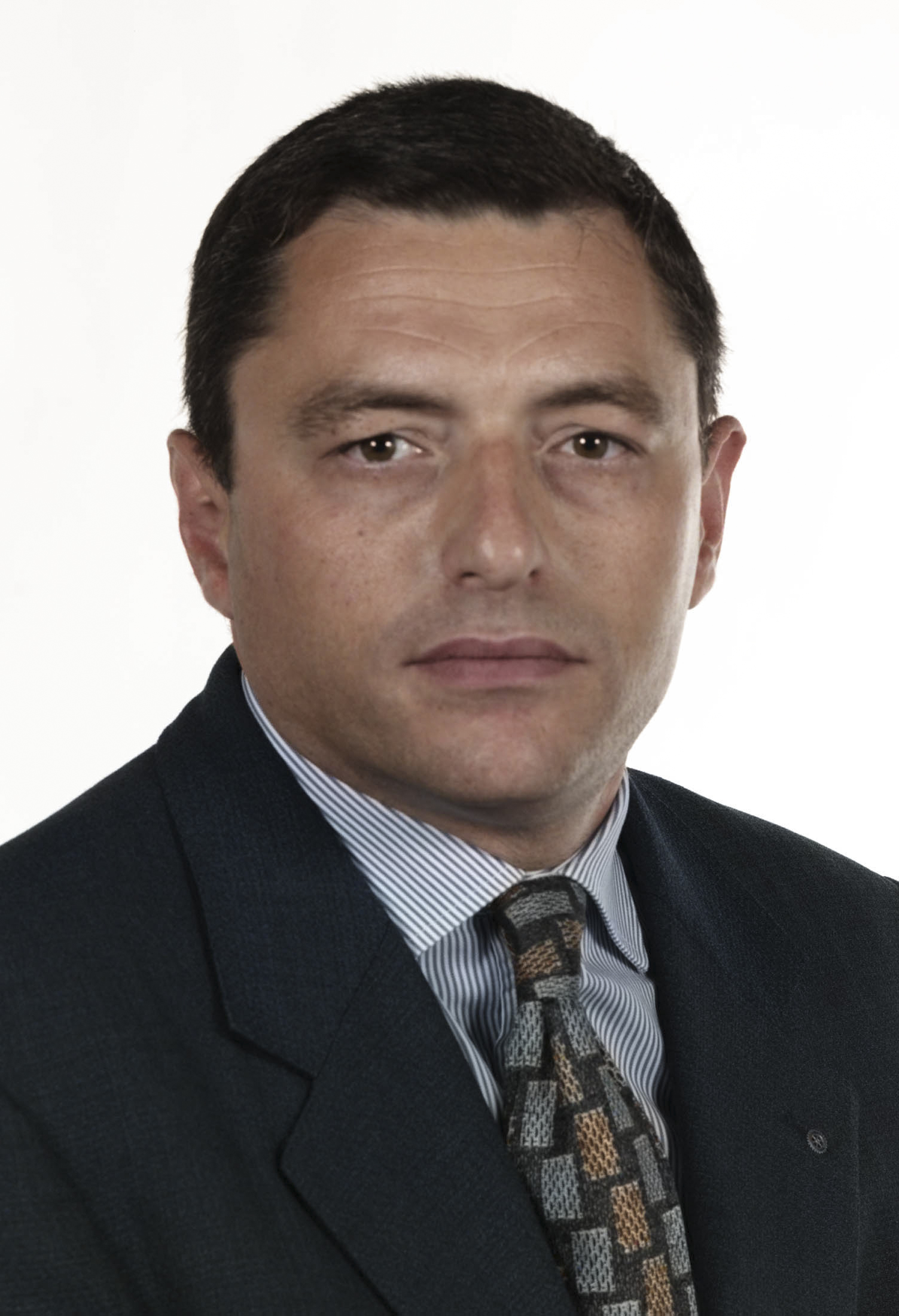
	Majority party	Minority party
Leader	Giancarlo Galan	Massimo Carraro
Party	Forza Italia	Independent
Alliance	House of Freedoms	The Union
Seats won	39	19
Seat change	▲2	▼4
Popular vote	1,359,879	1,138,631
Percentage	50.58%	42.35%
Swing	▼4.36%	▲4.13%
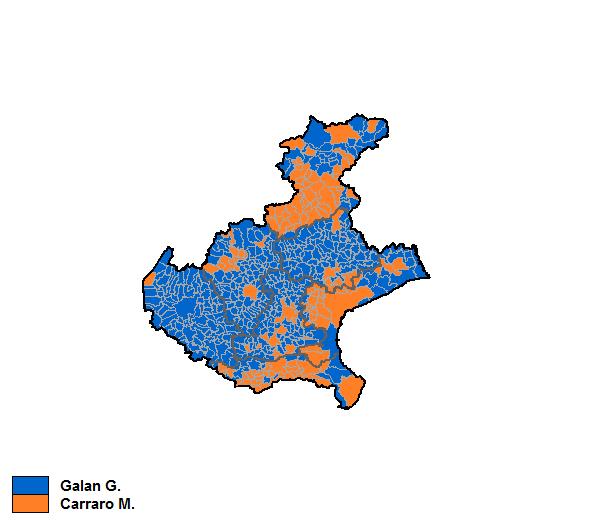
President before election
Giancarlo Galan
Forza Italia
Subsequent President
Giancarlo Galan
Forza Italia

The Venetian regional election of 2005 took place on 3–4 April 2005.

Giancarlo Galan (Forza Italia, House of Freedoms) was re-elected for the third time in a row President of the Region, but the support for him was diminished by the presence of a third candidate, Giorgio Panto, who picked votes both from the centre-right and the Venetist camps, and of a fourth candidate representing the far right, Roberto Bussinello.

Although Forza Italia remained the largest party in the Council and also in the Region as a whole (The Olive Tree was only an electoral alliance at the time and the three parties which were part of it formed separate groups in the Council), it suffered a serious decline in term of votes, from 30.3% of 2000 to 22.7%.

Venetist parties had a very good result: the combined score of Liga Veneta (14.7%), North-East Project (5.4%) and Liga Fronte Veneto (1.2%) was 21.3%, up from the 15.6% of 2000 (Liga Veneta 12.0%, Veneti d'Europa 2.4% and Fronte Marco Polo 1.2%).

== Electoral system ==
Regional elections in Veneto were ruled by the "Tatarella law" (approved in 1995), which provided for a mixed electoral system: four fifths of the regional councilors were elected in provincial constituencies by proportional representation, using the largest remainder method with a droop quota and open lists, while the residual votes and the unassigned seats were grouped into a "single regional constituency", where the whole ratios and the highest remainders were divided with the Hare method among the provincial party lists; one fifth of the council seats instead was reserved for regional lists and assigned with a majoritarian system: the leader of the regional list that scored the highest number of votes was elected to the presidency of the Region while the other candidates were elected regional councilors.

A threshold of 3% had been established for the provincial lists, which, however, could still have entered the regional council if the regional list to which they were connected had scored at least 5% of valid votes.

The panachage was also allowed: the voter can indicate a candidate for the presidency but prefer a provincial list connected to another candidate.

== Parties and candidates ==
Political party or alliance	Constituent lists	Previous result		Candidate
Political party or alliance	Constituent lists	Votes (%)	Seats	Candidate
House of Freedoms	Forza Italia	30.4	17	Giancarlo Galan
House of Freedoms	Northern League – Venetian League	12.0	6	Giancarlo Galan
House of Freedoms	National Alliance	9.8	5	Giancarlo Galan
House of Freedoms	Union of Christian and Centre Democrats	6.8	3	Giancarlo Galan
House of Freedoms	New Italian Socialist Party	0.7	–	Giancarlo Galan
The Union	The Olive Tree (incl. DS, DL, SDI)	27.2	18	Massimo Carraro
The Union	Communist Refoundation Party	3.0	2	Massimo Carraro
The Union	Liga Fronte Veneto	2.5	–	Massimo Carraro
The Union	Federation of the Greens	2.3	1	Massimo Carraro
The Union	Consumers' List	1.6	1	Massimo Carraro
The Union	Party of Italian Communists	1.0	1	Massimo Carraro
The Union	Carraro List	—N/a	—N/a	Massimo Carraro
The Union	Italy of Values	—N/a	—N/a	Massimo Carraro
The Union	Union of Democrats for Europe	—N/a	—N/a	Massimo Carraro
North-East Project		—N/a	—N/a	Giorgio Panto
Social Alternative (AS – FT – FSN – FN)		—N/a	—N/a	Roberto Bussinello

== Results ==
3–4 April 2005 Venetian regional election results
Candidates	Votes	%	Seats	Parties	Votes	%	Seat
Giancarlo Galan	1,359,879	50.58	12				
Giancarlo Galan	1,359,879	50.58	12	Forza Italia	523,896	22.71	12
Giancarlo Galan	1,359,879	50.58	12	Northern League – Venetian League	337,896	14.65	7
Giancarlo Galan	1,359,879	50.58	12	National Alliance	186,396	8.08	4
Giancarlo Galan	1,359,879	50.58	12	Union of Christian and Centre Democrats	147,953	6.41	3
Giancarlo Galan	1,359,879	50.58	12	New Italian Socialist Party – Others	32,851	1.42	1
Giancarlo Galan	1,359,879	50.58	12	Total	1,228,992	53.28	27
Massimo Carraro	1,138,631	42.35	1				
Massimo Carraro	1,138,631	42.35	1	The Olive Tree	560,629	24.30	13
Massimo Carraro	1,138,631	42.35	1	For Veneto with Carraro	107,333	4.65	2
Massimo Carraro	1,138,631	42.35	1	Communist Refoundation Party	80,424	3.49	1
Massimo Carraro	1,138,631	42.35	1	Federation of the Greens	69,191	3.00	1
Massimo Carraro	1,138,631	42.35	1	Party of Italian Communists	35,067	1.52	1
Massimo Carraro	1,138,631	42.35	1	Italy of Values	29,607	1.28	–
Massimo Carraro	1,138,631	42.35	1	Liga Fronte Veneto	27,524	1.19	–
Massimo Carraro	1,138,631	42.35	1	Consumers' List	15,658	0.68	–
Massimo Carraro	1,138,631	42.35	1	Union of Democrats for Europe	6,265	0.27	–
Massimo Carraro	1,138,631	42.35	1	Total	931,698	40.39	18
Giorgio Panto	161,642	6.01	–	North-East Project	125,690	5.45	2
Roberto Bussinello	28,565	1.06	–	Social Alternative	20,434	0.89	–
Total candidates	2,688,717	100.00	13	Total parties	2,306,814	100.00	47
Source: Ministry of the Interior

=== Council composition ===
Distribution of Seats in the Regional Council
Political Group	Leader	2005	2010
Forza Italia	Remo Sernagiotto	16	16
The Olive Tree – Venetian Democratic Party	Giovanni Gallo	-	12
Liga Veneta–Lega Nord	Franco Manzato / Roberto Ciambetti	11	10
National Alliance	Piergiorgio Cortelazzo	6	6
Union of Christian and Centre Democrats	Onorio De Boni	5	4
Italy of Values	Damiano Rossato	-	2
North-East Project	Mariangelo Foggiato	2	1
For Veneto with Carraro	Marco Zabotti	2	1
Communist Refoundation Party	Pietrangelo Pettenò	1	1
Federation of the Greens	Gianfranco Bettin	1	1
New Italian Socialist Party	Nereo Laroni	1	1
Party of Italian Communists	Nicola Atalmi	1	1
Veneto for the European People's Party	Raffaele Grazia	-	1
Venetian Agreement	Carlo Covi	-	1
Venetian People's Movement	Francesco Piccolo	-	1
Forum of Venetians	Diego Cancian	-	1
Democracy is Freedom – The Daisy	Achille Variati	7	-
Democrats of the Left	Giovanni Gallo	5	-
Italian Democratic Socialists	Carlo Covi	1	-
United for Carraro	Massimo Carraro	1	-

Sources: Regional Council of Veneto – Groups and Regional Council of Veneto – Members

== Aftermath ==
After the election, Giancarlo Galan formed his third government. Due to the new strength of Liga Veneta, which received about 2/3 of the vote for Forza Italia, the coalition balance was clearly changed in favour of Liga Veneta. This party had both the post of President of the Regional Council for Marino Finozzi and the most important ministry, the Health ministry, for Flavio Tosi (who was replaced by Francesca Martini in 2007).

Also the post of Vice President of Veneto went to a lighista, Luca Zaia, in place of Fabio Gava (Forza Italia), who had been also Minister of Health in second term. Forza Italia was indeed far less strong than in 2000, when it won 30.3% of the vote: in comparison with 2000, Forza Italia lost three regional deputies, while Liga Veneta had a net gain of four.

Third Galan government
Office	Name	Party
President	Giancarlo Galan	FI
Under-Secretary	Leonardo Padrin (since 12 June 2007)	FI
Vice President	Luca Zaia (until 6 June 2008); Franco Manzato (since 6 June 2008)	LV
Minister of Economy, Development and Innovation	Fabio Gava (until 9 July 2008); Vendemiano Sartor (since 9 July 2008)	FI
Minister of Budget, Finances, International Relations	Maria Luisa Coppola	AN
Minister of Health	Flavio Tosi (until 26 June 2007); Francesca Martini (26 June 2007 – 6 June 2008); Sandro Sandri (since 6 June 2008)	LV
Minister of Security and Public Works	Massimo Giorgetti	AN
Minister of Social Affairs	Antonio De Poli (until 28 July 2006); Stefano Valdegamberi (since 9 November 2006)	UDC
Minister of Education	Elena Donazzan	AN
Minister of Transports and Infrastructures	Renato Chisso	FI
Minister of Agriculture and Tourism	Luca Zaia (until 6 June 2008); Franco Manzato (since 6 June 2008)	LV
Minister of Environment	Giancarlo Conta	FI
Minister of Immigration	Oscar De Bona	NPSI
Minister of Territorial Affairs	Renzo Marangon	FI
Minister of Local Affairs	Stefano Valdegamberi (until 9 November 2006); Flavio Silvestrin (since 9 November 2006)	UDC

Source: Region of Veneto — The Regional Government from 1970 until today
