= Barbara Degani =

Italian politician from Veneto

Barbara Degani (Turin, 11 August 1966) is an Italian politician from Veneto.

Born in Piedmont, Degani grew up in Padua, Veneto. She entered politics in 1994 by joining Forza Italia. In 1996 she became head of the regional secretariat of the party under Giorgio Carollo. She was elected to the Regional Council of Veneto in 2000 and 2005. In 2009 she was elected President of the Province of Padua for The People of Freedom. Having joined the New Centre-Right, she was appointed undersecretary of Environment in Renzi Cabinet in 2014.

As February 28, 2014 she is Secretary of the Environment, appointed in the Renzi Cabinet and confirmed in the Gentiloni Cabinet.

Degani is married to Raffaele Grazia, whom she met in the Regional Council as he was a councillor of Forza Italia too, before switching to Carollo's Veneto for the European People's Party and, finally, to the Union of the Centre.
