= Giorgio Panto =

Italian entrepreneur and politician (1941–2006)

Giorgio Panto (1 October 1941 – 26 November 2006) was an Italian entrepreneur and politician.

Panto was born at Meolo, in the Province of Venice. After being a long-time supporter of the Liga Veneta–Lega Nord, in 2004 he founded a new Venetist and fiscal federalist party called North-East Project (Progetto NordEst, PNE), in which he welcomed many former Leghisti as Ettore Beggiato, Mariangelo Foggiato and Diego Cancian. It was not the first time that Panto ran for the post of President of the Region: in fact, in the 1995 regional election Panto won 3.7%, under the banner of New Italy and Lega Autonomia Veneta.

In the 2005 Venetian regional election, he won 6.0% of the vote (16.1% in the stronghold of Treviso) as candidate for President of the Region, coming third after Giancarlo Galan (Forza Italia/House of Freedoms) and Massimo Carraro (The Union). The PNE list took the 5.4%, electing two regional deputies.

In the 2006 provincial elections in Treviso, he came third with the 10.3%, after Leonardo Muraro (Liga Veneta-Lega Nord/House of Freedoms) and Lorenzo Biagi (DL/The Union), while the PNE list scored 10.8%.

He was also involved in the entrepreneurs' trade union European Federalist Free Entrepreneurs (LIFE), founded by Fabio Padovan.

He died in Venice in a helicopter accident on 26 November 2006.
