= 1995 Venetian regional election =

Italian regional election

- 23 April 1995

All 65 seats to the Regional Council
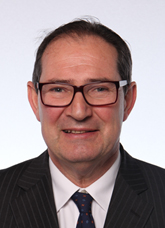

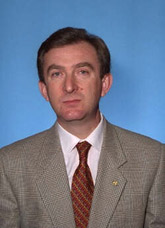
	Majority party	Minority party	Third party
Leader	Giancarlo Galan	Ettore Bentsik	Alberto Lembo
Party	Forza Italia	Independent	Northern League
Alliance	Centre-right	Centre-left
Seats won	36	20	9
Popular vote	1,117,377	945,753	512,578
Percentage	38.22%	32.35%	17.46%
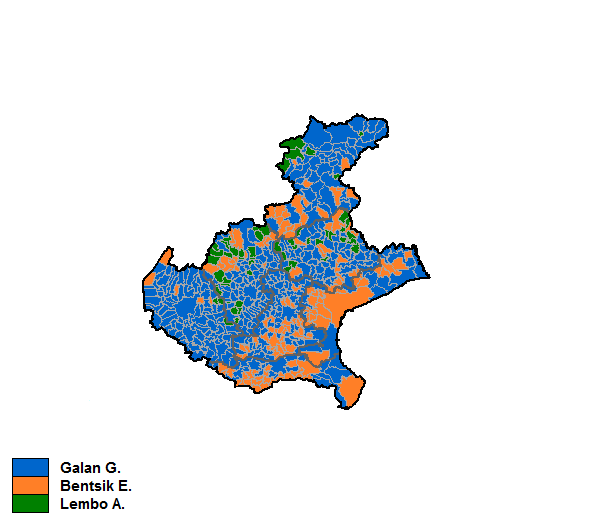
President before election
Aldo Bottin
People's Party
Subsequent President
Giancarlo Galan
Forza Italia

The Venetian regional election of 1995 took place on 23 April 1995.

For the first time the President of the Region was directly elected by the people, although the election was not yet binding and the President-elect could have been replaced during the term.

Giancarlo Galan (Forza Italia) was elected President of the Region over the centre-left candidate Ettore Bentsik (Italian People's Party), despite the presence of a third candidate, Alberto Lembo (Northern League).

Among party lists, the joint list formed by Forza Italia and the People's Pole (the right wing of the People's Party replaced Christian Democracy, which was disbanded in 1994, as the largest political force in the Region. Liga Veneta came second, while the Democratic Party of the Left, heir of the Italian Communist Party, had its best result ever in a regional election.

== Electoral system ==
Regional elections in Veneto were ruled by the "Tatarella law" (approved in 1995), which provided for a mixed electoral system: four fifths of the regional councilors were elected in provincial constituencies by proportional representation, using the largest remainder method with a droop quota and open lists, while the residual votes and the unassigned seats were grouped into a "single regional constituency", where the whole ratios and the highest remainders were divided with the Hare method among the provincial party lists; one fifth of the council seats instead was reserved for regional lists and assigned with a majoritarian system: the leader of the regional list that scored the highest number of votes was elected to the presidency of the Region while the other candidates were elected regional councilors.

A threshold of 3% had been established for the provincial lists, which, however, could still have entered the regional council if the regional list to which they were connected had scored at least 5% of valid votes.

The panachage was also allowed: the voter can indicate a candidate for the presidency but prefer a provincial list connected to another candidate.

== Parties and candidates ==
Political party or alliance	Constituent lists	Previous result		Candidate
Political party or alliance	Constituent lists	Votes (%)	Seats	Candidate
Centre-left coalition	Italian People's Party	42.4	27	Ettore Bentsik
Centre-left coalition	Democratic Party of the Left	15.6	10	Ettore Bentsik
Centre-left coalition	Federation of the Greens	7.1	4	Ettore Bentsik
Centre-left coalition	Italian Republican Party – Labour Federation	2.6	1	Ettore Bentsik
Centre-left coalition	Pact of Democrats	—N/a	—N/a	Ettore Bentsik
Northern League		5.9	3	Alberto Lembo
Centre-right coalition	National Alliance	2.7	1	Giancarlo Galan
Centre-right coalition	Forza Italia	—N/a	—N/a	Giancarlo Galan
Centre-right coalition	Christian Democratic Centre	—N/a	—N/a	Giancarlo Galan
Pannella List		1.1	1	Emilio Vesce
Communist Refoundation Party		—N/a	—N/a	Paolo Cacciari
New Italy–Venetian Autonomy		—N/a	—N/a	Giorgio Panto

== Results ==
23 April 1995 Venetian regional election results
Candidates	Votes	%	Seats	Parties	Votes	%	Seat
Giancarlo Galan	1,117,377	38.22	12				
Giancarlo Galan	1,117,377	38.22	12	Forza Italia – The People's Pole	606,977	23.97	15
Giancarlo Galan	1,117,377	38.22	12	National Alliance	271,835	10.73	6
Giancarlo Galan	1,117,377	38.22	12	Christian Democratic Centre	90,285	3.56	3
Giancarlo Galan	1,117,377	38.22	12	Total	969,097	38.27	24
Ettore Bentsik	945,753	32.35	–				
Ettore Bentsik	945,753	32.35	–	Democratic Party of the Left	416,799	16.46	9
Ettore Bentsik	945,753	32.35	–	Italian People's Party	271,423	10.72	5
Ettore Bentsik	945,753	32.35	–	Pact of Democrats	109,778	4.33	2
Ettore Bentsik	945,753	32.35	–	Federation of the Greens	102,156	4.03	2
Ettore Bentsik	945,753	32.35	–	Italian Republican Party – Labour Federation	11,686	0.46	–
Ettore Bentsik	945,753	32.35	–	Total	911,842	36.01	18
Alberto Lembo	512,578	17.46	–	Northern League – Venetian League	422,410	16.68	9
Paolo Cacciari	200,649	6.86	–	Communist Refoundation Party	126,594	5.00	2
Giorgio Panto	108,072	3.70	–	New Italy–Venetian Autonomy	73,342	2.90	–
Emilio Vesce	41,142	1.41	–	Pannella List	29,254	1.16	–
Total candidates	2,925,971	100.00	12	Total parties	2,532,539	100.00	53
Source: Ministry of the Interior

== Aftermath ==
After the election, Giancarlo Galan formed his first government, while Amalia Sartori (Forza Italia) was elected President of the Regional Council.

First Galan government
Office	Name	Party
President	Giancarlo Galan	FI
Vice President	Bruno Canella	AN
Minister of Economy and Development	Floriano Pra	FI
Minister of Budget and Finances	Fabio Gava	FI
Minister of Health	Iles Braghetto	CDU
Minister of Social Affairs	Raffaele Zanon	AN
Minister of Agriculture	Sergio Berlato (until 19 July 1999); Luca Bellotti (since 16 September 1999)	AN
Minister of Transports	Raffaele Bazzoni	FI
Minister of Environment	Massimo Giorgetti	AN
Minister of Tourism and Productive Activities	Pierluigi Bolla (until 14 December 1999)	FI
Minister of Labour and Sports	Cesare Campa	FI
Minister of Local Affairs and Cities	Franco Bozzolin	CCD
Minister of Territorial Affairs	Gaetano Fontana	CDU
Minister of the Treasury, Parks and European Affairs	Francesco Piccolo (since 23 September 1998)	CDU

Source: Region of Veneto — The Regional Government from 1970 until today
