= Giovanni Gallo (politician) =

Italian politician

Member of the Provincial Council of Padua
- In office 30 May 1995 – 26 October 1998

Member of the Regional Council of Veneto
- In office 29 May 2000 – 30 March 2010

Personal details
- Born: 6 February 1955 (age 70); Loreggia, Veneto, Italy
- Political party: Italian Communist Party (until 1991); Democratic Party of the Left (1991–1998); Democrats of the Left (1998–2007); Democratic Party (since 2007)
- Occupation: Public administrator

Giovanni Gallo (born 6 February 1955) is an Italian politician from Veneto.

A long-time member of the Italian Communist Party (PCI), he served as a councillor of the municipality of Montegrotto, and later of the municipality of Anguillara Veneta from 1985 to 1990. After the dissolution of the PCI, Gallo joined the Democratic Party of the Left, which later became the Democrats of the Left, and was elected to the Provincial Council of Padua.

In 2000, Gallo was elected to the Regional Council of Veneto, and re-elected in 2005. During his term as regional councillor, he served as Vice President of the Special Commission for Community Relations and member of the 1st and 7th Committees. Between 2005 and 2010 he also served as provincial secretary and floor leader of the Democrats of the Left and, later, of the Democratic Party.

== See also ==
- 2000 Venetian regional election
- 2005 Venetian regional election
- Members of the Regional Council of Veneto, 2005–2010
