= Cesare Campa =

Italian politician

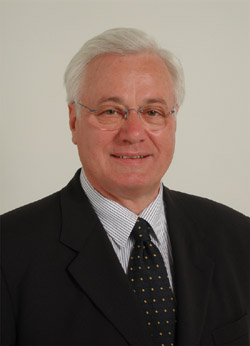
Cesare Campa in 2006

Cesare Campa (born 8 March 1943) is an Italian politician from Murano, Veneto.

A long-time Christian Democrat, he was elected to the Regional Council of Veneto for Forza Italia in 1995 and 2000. From 1995 to 2000 Campa was regional minister of Labour and Sports in Galan I Government. In the 2001 general election he was elected to the Chamber of Deputies and re-elected in 2006.
