= Remo Sernagiotto =

Italian politician (1955–2020)

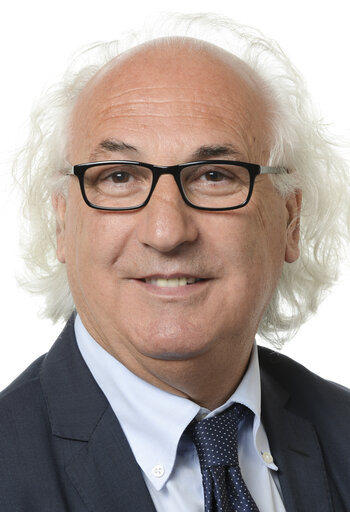
- Official portrait, 2014

Personal details
- Born: 1 September 1955 Montebelluna, Italy
- Died: 29 November 2020 (aged 65) Treviso
- Party: European People's Party
- Profession: European Parliament member, Politician

Remo Sernagiotto (1 September 1955 – 29 November 2020) was an Italian politician from Veneto.

== Career ==
Sernagiotto was born in Montebelluna. A long-time Christian Democrat, he was first elected to the Regional Council of Veneto in 2000 regional election for Forza Italia (FI). He was re-elected to the Regional Council of Veneto in 2005 regional election for FI and he became floor leader of his party, often being a vocal critic of President Giancarlo Galan (FI). Re-elected for The People of Freedom (PdL) in 2010 regional election, he was appointed regional minister of Social Affairs in Zaia I Government.

In the 2014 European Parliament election Sernagiotto was elected member of the European Parliament (MEP) for the newly organised Forza Italia and subsequently resigned as regional minister. In July 2015 he left FI and the European People's Party, along with fellow MEP Raffaele Fitto, in order to join the European Conservatives and Reformists Group (ECRG) under the newly formed Italian Conservatives and Reformists (CR) party. In January 2017 he and Fitto (with other politicians in Italy) formed Direction Italy (DI), a new party created by CR with other minor parties.
