= Raffaele Bazzoni =

Italian politician from Veneto

Raffaele Bazzoni (born 8 April 1953 in Zevio) is an Italian politician from Veneto.

A long-time Christian Democrat, he was elected to the Regional Council of Veneto for Forza Italia in 1995, 2000 and 2005. Between 1995 and 2000 he was regional minister of Transports in Galan I Government.
