= 1963 Italian general election in Veneto =

The Italian general election of 1963 took place on 28 April 1963.

Christian Democracy (DC) was by far the largest party in Veneto with 52.7% of the vote.

== Results ==
=== Chamber of Deputies ===
Party	votes	votes (%)	seats
Christian Democracy	1,243,410	52.7	26
Italian Socialist Party	364,965	15.5	7
Italian Communist Party	348,702	14.8	7
Italian Democratic Socialist Party	166,716	7.1	2
Italian Liberal Party	128,934	5.5	3
Italian Social Movement	70,967	3.0	1
Others	37,461	1.6	-
Total	2,361,155	100.0	46

Source: Regional Council of Veneto

==== Provincial breakdown ====
Province	DC	PSDI	PSI	PCI
Verona	53.5	5.8	18.3	11.7
Vicenza	63.8	6.4	11.4	7.9
Padua	57.6	5.2	12.9	13.9
Treviso	57.4	9.6	14.0	10.1
Belluno	50.9	14.7	13.5	11.4
Venice	39.4	6.7	19.9	23.3
Rovigo	39.8	5.9	15.4	29.3
Veneto	52.7	7.1	15.5	14.8

Source: Regional Council of Veneto

=== Senate ===
Party	votes	votes (%)	seats
Christian Democracy	1,106,788	52.7	14
Italian Socialist Party	317,025	15.1	4
Italian Communist Party	315,259	15.0	3
Italian Democratic Socialist Party	155.795	7.4	1
Italian Liberal Party	121,543	5.8	1
Italian Social Movement	70,421	3.4	-
Others	13,445	0.6	-
Total	2,100,762	100.0	23

Source: Regional Council of Veneto
