= 1976 Italian general election in Veneto =

The Italian general election of 1976 took place on 20 June 1976.

In Veneto Christian Democracy was, as usual, the largest party with 51.4% of the vote.

== Results ==
=== Chamber of Deputies ===
Party	votes	votes (%)	seats
Christian Democracy	1,476,810	51.4	24
Italian Communist Party	683,083	23.8	11
Italian Socialist Party	301,688	10.5	5
Italian Democratic Socialist Party	122,458	4.3	2
Italian Social Movement	94,810	3.3	1
Italian Republican Party	88,638	3.1	1
Proletarian Democracy	44,844	1.6	-
Italian Liberal Party	32,312	1.1	-
Radical Party	29,626	1.0	-
Others	1,589	0.1	-
Total	2,875,858	100.0	44

Source: Regional Council of Veneto

==== Provincial breakdown ====
Province	DC	PSI	PCI
Verona	53.4	11.0	20.8
Vicenza	62.6	8.8	14.7
Padua	56.0	8.2	22.7
Treviso	54.1	10.1	19.3
Belluno	44.5	13.3	22.7
Venice	38.2	12.7	34.8
Rovigo	41.0	11.1	36.1
Veneto	51.4	10.5	23.8

Source: Regional Council of Veneto

=== Senate ===
Party	votes	votes (%)	seats
Christian Democracy	1,290,256	52.4	14
Italian Communist Party	572,219	23.2	6
Italian Socialist Party	261,206	10.6	2
Italian Democratic Socialist Party	113,247	4.6	1
Italian Social Movement	85,715	3.5	-
Italian Republican Party	81,517	3.3	-
Italian Liberal Party	37,007	1.5	-
Others	20,176	0.8	-
Total	2,461,343	100.0	23

Source: Regional Council of Veneto
