= Piergiorgio Cortelazzo =

Italian politician from Veneto

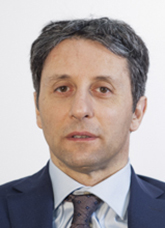

Personal details
- Born: February 20, 1969 (age 56); Este, Veneto, Italy
- Political party: The People of Freedom
- Occupation: Politician

Piergiorgio Cortelazzo (Este, 20 February 1969) is an Italian politician from Veneto.

He was first elected to the Regional Council of Veneto in 2000 for National Alliance and was then re-elected in 2005 and 2010. Between 2005 and 2010 he was floor leader of National Alliance in the Council, while from 2010 to 2015 he was deputy floor leader of the group of The People of Freedom.
