= 1972 Italian general election in Veneto =

The Italian general election of 1972 took place on 7 May 1972.

In Veneto Christian Democracy was, as usual, the largest party with 53.0% of the vote.

== Results ==
=== Chamber of Deputies ===
Party	votes	votes (%)	seats
Christian Democracy	1,378,290	53.0	26
Italian Communist Party	450,193	17.3	9
Italian Socialist Party	251,607	9.7	4
Italian Democratic Socialist Party	159,583	6.1	2
Italian Social Movement	115,083	4.4	2
Italian Liberal Party	94,053	3.6	2
Italian Socialist Party of Proletarian Unity	59,623	2.3	-
Italian Republican Party	55,880	2.2	1
Others	31,218	1.3	-
Total	2,598,530	100.0	46

Source: Regional Council of Veneto

==== Provincial breakdown ====
Province	DC	PSDI	PSI	PCI
Verona	54.3	5.8	10.5	14.8
Vicenza	65.4	5.1	7.6	9.5
Padua	57.7	4.7	6.6	16.7
Treviso	56.7	8.3	9.8	12.0
Belluno	46.8	11.3	13.7	14.3
Venice	39.6	5.4	12.1	27.1
Rovigo	41.2	6.0	9.9	31.7
Veneto	53.0	6.1	9.7	17.3

Source: Regional Council of Veneto

=== Senate ===
Party	votes	votes (%)	seats
Christian Democracy	1,245,628	53.4	14
Italian Communist Party–PSIUP	434,777	18.7	4
Italian Socialist Party	253,854	10.9	2
Italian Democratic Socialist Party	157,802	6.8	1
Italian Social Movement	107,423	4.6	1
Italian Liberal Party	94,957	4.1	1
Italian Republican Party	36,446	1.6	-
Total	2,330,887	100.0	23

Source: Regional Council of Veneto
