= First Galan government =

Government led by Giancarlo Galan from 1995-2000

The first Galan government, led by president Giancarlo Galan, was the 14th government of Veneto and was in office from 26 June 1995 to 6 June 2000.

First Galan government
Office	Name	Party
President	Giancarlo Galan	FI
Vice President	Bruno Canella	AN
Minister of Economy and Development	Floriano Pra	FI
Minister of Budget and Finances	Fabio Gava	FI
Minister of Health	Iles Braghetto	CDU
Minister of Social Affairs	Raffaele Zanon	AN
Minister of Agriculture	Sergio Berlato (until 19 July 1999); Luca Bellotti (since 16 September 1999)	AN
Minister of Transports	Raffaele Bazzoni	FI
Minister of Environment	Massimo Giorgetti	AN
Minister of Tourism and Productive Activities	Pierluigi Bolla (until 14 December 1999)	FI
Minister of Labour and Sports	Cesare Campa	FI
Minister of Local Affairs and Cities	Franco Bozzolin	CCD
Minister of Territorial Affairs	Gaetano Fontana	CDU
Minister of the Treasury, Parks and European Affairs	Francesco Piccolo (since 23 September 1998)	CDU

Source: Region of Veneto — The Regional Government from 1970 until today
