= 1948 Italian general election in Veneto =

General election in Italy

The Italian general election of 1948 took place on 18 April 1948.

The election was a triumph for Christian Democracy (DC), which won a thumping 60.5% throughout Veneto. The party did better in its traditional strongholds, Vicenza (71.8%), Padua (65.4%) and Treviso (64.9%). The Italian Socialist Party (PSI) and the Italian Communist Party (PCI), which formed a joint list named Popular Democratic Front (FDP), won just 23.9% of the vote. Apart from Rovigo, where the FDP gained 48.2%, many Socialist votes went to DC and the Italian Democratic Socialist Party (PSDI), an outfit formed by those Socialists who had been opposed to the alliance with the Communists. The PSDI garnered 10.1% of the vote at the regional level, one of the highest tallies among regions, and was stronger in Belluno (15.9%), Treviso (12.6%) and Verona (10.1%).

== Results ==
=== Chamber of Deputies ===
Party	votes	votes (%)	seats
Christian Democracy	1,327,040	60.5	29
Popular Democratic Front	525,900	24.0	11
Italian Democratic Socialist Party	221,937	10.1	4
National Bloc	37,510	1.7	-
Italian Social Movement	26,143	1.2	-
Italian Republican Party	17,892	0.8	-
Monarchist National Party	12,321	0.6	-
Others	7,943	0.4	-
Total	2,192,842	100.0	44

Source: Regional Council of Veneto

==== Provincial breakdown ====
Province	DC	PSDI	FDP*
Verona	62.4	10.1	22.3
Vicenza	71.8	9.0	13.9
Padua	65.4	7.6	21.9
Treviso	64.9	12.6	15.2
Belluno	61.1	15.9	15.7
Venice	50.6	9.8	34.4
Rovigo	38.4	9.6	48.2
Veneto	60.5	10.1	23.9

Source: Regional Council of Veneto

=== Senate ===
Party	votes	votes (%)	seats
Christian Democracy	1,153,598	61.8	14
Popular Democratic Front	446,984	24.0	4
Italian Democratic Socialist Party–PRI	181,396	9.7	1
National Bloc	70,481	3.8	-
Independents	13,729	0.7	-
Total	1,866,188	100.0	19

Source: Regional Council of Veneto
