= Raffaele Zanon =

Italian politician

Raffaele Zanon (born 26 September 1957 in Verona) is an Italian politician.

He joined the Italian Social Movement in the 1970s and later National Alliance. Three times elected to the Regional Council of Veneto (1995, 2000, 2005), he was regional minister of Social Affairs in Galan I Government (1995–2000) and minister of Security and Immigration in Galan II Government (2000–2005).

In 2008, along with National Alliance, Zanon joined The People of Freedom (PdL), but failed to be re-elected to the Council in 2010. He is also the leader of Venetian Right, a regional faction of the PdL composed by former Missini who are both Italian and Venetian nationalists.
