= 1958 Italian general election in Veneto =

The Italian general election of 1958 took place on 25 May 1958.

Christian Democracy (DC) was by far the largest party in Veneto with 55.5%, while the Italian Socialist Party (PSI) came distant second with 16.1%. Veneto was thus one of the few regions of Italy where the Socialists were stronger than the Italian Communist Party (PCI), even without counting the Italian Democratic Socialist Party (PSDI).

== Results ==
=== Chamber of Deputies ===
Party	votes	votes (%)	seats
Christian Democracy	1,274,152	55.5	27
Italian Socialist Party	370,650	16.1	7
Italian Communist Party	306,264	13.3	7
Italian Democratic Socialist Party	138,892	6.0	2
Italian Liberal Party	73,888	3.2	1
Italian Social Movement	73,837	3.2	1
Others	58,300	2.5	-
Total	2,295,983	100.0	45

Source: Regional Council of Veneto

==== Provincial breakdown ====
Province	DC	PSDI	PSI	PCI
Verona	56.3	4.8	19.4	10.5
Vicenza	66.5	5.5	10.4	8.1
Padua	60.6	4.4	13.6	12.2
Treviso	61.3	8.8	12.9	8.3
Belluno	55.0	11.7	14.1	10.0
Venice	43.1	6.0	21.5	19.7
Rovigo	39.6	4.5	19.7	28.1
Veneto	55.5	6.0	16.1	13.3

Source: Regional Council of Veneto

=== Senate ===
Party	votes	votes (%)	seats
Christian Democracy	1,134,415	55.7	13
Italian Socialist Party	325,982	16.0	3
Italian Communist Party	268,788	13.2	3
Italian Democratic Socialist Party	127,996	6.3	1
Italian Social Movement	74,996	3.7	-
Italian Liberal Party	69,691	3.4	-
Others	33,735	1.6	-
Total	2,035,603	100.0	20

Source: Regional Council of Veneto
