= Together for Veneto =

Together for Veneto (Insieme per il Veneto, IpV), also known as Cacciari List, was a centrist coalition of political parties active in Veneto.

It was formed for the 2000 regional election by the local sections of three national parties: the Italian People's Party, The Democrats and Italian Renewal. Under the leadership of Massimo Cacciari, who was also candidate for President for the whole centre-left The Olive Tree coalition, the joint centrist list won 13.6% and elected ten regional deputies: six Populars, three Democrats and Massimo Cacciari himself (the Democrats), who was defeated by Giancarlo Galan (Forza Italia, House of Freedoms). The list was the most voted one within the centre-left coalition, as the Democrats of the Left stopped at 12.3%.

The elects of the list formed a group named "Together for Veneto", which later changed its name into "Together for Veneto – The Daisy".

Cacciari, in an interview, considered Together for Veneto a precursor of Democracy is Freedom – The Daisy at a regional level.
