= 1968 Italian general election in Veneto =

The Italian general election of 1968 took place on 19 May 1968.

In Veneto Christian Democracy was, as usual, the largest party with 52.9% of the vote.

== Results ==
=== Chamber of Deputies ===
Party	votes	votes (%)	seats
Christian Democracy	1,308,757	52.9	26
Italian Communist Party	412,825	16.7	8
Unified Socialist Party	376,037	15.2	7
Italian Socialist Party of Proletarian Unity	129,791	5.2	2
Italian Liberal Party	127,382	5.1	2
Italian Social Movement	64,289	2.6	1
Others	55,708	2.2	-
Total	2,474,789	100.0	46

Source: Regional Council of Veneto

==== Provincial breakdown ====
Province	DC	PSU	PCI
Verona	54.1	15.6	14.4
Vicenza	64.4	13.3	9.3
Padua	58.2	11.4	15.5
Treviso	56.4	15.6	11.6
Belluno	48.3	24.2	13.2
Venice	39.6	16.6	26.0
Rovigo	40.6	15.5	31.5
Veneto	52.9	15.2	16.7

Source: Regional Council of Veneto

=== Senate ===
Party	votes	votes (%)	seats
Christian Democracy	1,172,706	53.1	13
Italian Communist Party–PSIUP	448,237	20.3	5
Unified Socialist Party	369,748	16.7	4
Italian Liberal Party	129,888	5.9	1
Italian Social Movement	66,973	3.0	-
Others	20,888	0.9	-
Total	2,208,440	100.0	23

Source: Regional Council of Veneto
