= 1946 Italian general election in Veneto =

The Italian general election of 1946 took place on 2 June 1946.

The election was the first after the return of democracy. Christian Democracy (DC) was by far the largest party in Veneto (49.5%) and was especially strong in the provinces of Vicenza (61.1%), Padua (55.7%) and Treviso (53.5%). The Italian Socialist Party (PSI) came second (26.7%) and was stronger in the provinces of Rovigo (35.7%), Verona (33.3%) and Belluno (28.7%). The Italian Communist Party (PCI) was a distant third (13.6%), but came second in Rovigo (28.5%), where the parties of the left gained a large majority (56.5%). Rovigo, the southernmost province, was influenced by nearby "red" Emilia-Romagna.

== Results ==
=== Constituent Assembly ===
Party	votes	votes (%)	seats
Christian Democracy	969,095	49.6	22
Italian Socialist Party	523,446	26.8	12
Italian Communist Party	267,184	13.7	6
National Democratic Union	50,839	2.6	-
Action Party	40,429	2.1	-
Italian Republican Party	34,551	1.8	-
Common Man's Front	32,682	1.7	-
National Bloc of Freedom	19,263	1.0	-
Others	16,051	0.8	-
Total	1,953,990	100.0	40

Source: Regional Council of Veneto

==== Provincial breakdown ====
Province	DC	PSI	PCI
Verona	48.8	33.3	10.5
Vicenza	61.1	24.1	8.1
Padua	55.7	23.2	12.8
Treviso	53.5	21.1	8.5
Belluno	51.7	28.7	10.1
Venice	40.3	26.2	21.1
Rovigo	28.0	35.7	28.5
Veneto	49.5	26.7	13.6

Source: Regional Council of Veneto
