= 1953 Italian general election in Veneto =

The Italian general election of 1953 took place on 7 June 1953.

Christian Democracy (DC) lost some ground, but still gained a convincing 53.4% of the vote (62.2% in Vicenza, 59.9% in Treviso and 59.6% in Padua). The Italian Socialist Party (PSI) and the Italian Communist Party (PCI) ran separate lists, gaining 14.6 and 14.2% of the vote. Veneto was thus one of the few regions of Italy where the Socialists were stronger than the PCI, even without counting the PSDI (5.6%). The PSI got its best results in the provinces of Venice (21.6%), Rovigo (19.8%) and Verona (18.2%), but not in the traditional Socialist stronghold of Belluno, where it was passed by the PSDI (12.3 against 11.0%). The PCI was stronger in Rovigo (28.2%) and Venice (19.7%).

== Results ==
=== Chamber of Deputies ===
| Party | votes | votes (%) | seats |
|---|---|---|---|
| Christian Democracy | 1,181,214 | 53.4 | 27 |
| Italian Socialist Party | 324,578 | 14.7 | 7 |
| Italian Communist Party | 314,818 | 14.2 | 6 |
| Italian Democratic Socialist Party | 124,051 | 5.6 | 2 |
| Italian Social Movement | 79,306 | 3.6 | 1 |
| Italian Liberal Party | 66,934 | 3.0 | 1 |
| Monarchist National Party | 57,653 | 2.6 | - |
| Popular Unity | 21,013 | 1.0 | - |
| Total | 2,210,264 | 100.0 | 44 |

Source: Regional Council of Veneto

==== Provincial breakdown ====
| Province | DC | PSDI | PSI | PCI |
| Verona | 53.4 | 4.7 | 18.2 | 10.8 |
| Vicenza | 62.2 | 4.4 | 9.2 | 9.4 |
| Padua | 59.6 | 4.0 | 11.1 | 14.2 |
| Treviso | 59.9 | 8.0 | 11.9 | 8.6 |
| Belluno | 53.7 | 12.3 | 11.3 | 11.6 |
| Venice | 43.2 | 6.0 | 21.6 | 19.7 |
| Rovigo | 39.6 | 4.6 | 19.8 | 28.2 |
| Veneto | 53.4 | 5.6 | 14.6 | 14.2 |

Source: Regional Council of Veneto

=== Senate ===
| Party | votes | votes (%) | seats |
|---|---|---|---|
| Christian Democracy | 1,082,252 | 55.0 | 12 |
| Italian Communist Party | 288,421 | 14.7 | 3 |
| Italian Socialist Party | 273,233 | 13.9 | 3 |
| Italian Democratic Socialist Party | 108,157 | 5.5 | 1 |
| Italian Social Movement | 73,959 | 3.8 | - |
| Monarchist National Party | 50,743 | 2.6 | - |
| Italian Liberal Party | 47,470 | 2.4 | - |
| Popular Unity | 19,887 | 1.0 | - |
| Italian Republican Party | 15,028 | 0.8 | - |
| Others | 9,132 | 0.5 | - |
| Total | 1,968,282 | 100.0 | 19 |

Source: Regional Council of Veneto
