= Nereo Laroni =

Italian politician (1942–2019)

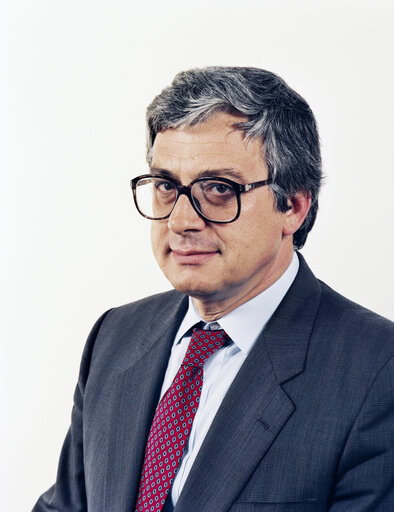
- Born: September 2, 1942; Venice, Italy
- Died: July 14, 2019 (aged 76); Mestre, Italy
- Occupation: Politician
- Office: member of the European Parliament
- Political party: Italian Socialist Party

Nereo Laroni (2 September 1942 – 14 July 2019) was an Italian politician.

== Career ==
A long-time member of the Italian Socialist Party and close ally of Bettino Craxi and Gianni De Michelis, he was the mayor of Venice from 1985 to 1987 and a member of the European Parliament from 1987 to 1994. In 2000 he returned to active politics by joining the New Italian Socialist Party. In the 2005 regional election he was elected to the Regional Council of Veneto, where he was a close ally of President Giancarlo Galan. Laroni was re-elected in 2010 from the regional list in support of Luca Zaia and sat in the group of The People of Freedom, before switching to the New Centre-Right in 2013.

Laroni died on 14 July 2019 in Mestre, at age 76, of complications from heart surgery.
