= 1979 Italian general election in Veneto =

The Italian general election of 1979 took place on 3 June 1979.

In Veneto Christian Democracy was, as usual, the largest party and obtained the majority of valid votes with 50.1% for the last time.

== Results ==
=== Chamber of Deputies ===
| Party | votes | votes (%) | seats |
|---|---|---|---|
| Christian Democracy | 1,454,613 | 50.1 | 24 |
| Italian Communist Party | 630,999 | 21.7 | 11 |
| Italian Socialist Party | 277,673 | 9.6 | 4 |
| Italian Democratic Socialist Party | 127,438 | 4.4 | 2 |
| Radical Party | 107,916 | 3.7 | 2 |
| Italian Social Movement | 90,624 | 3.1 | 1 |
| Italian Republican Party | 84,080 | 2.9 | 1 |
| Italian Liberal Party | 54,642 | 1.9 | 1 |
| Proletarian Unity Party | 39,608 | 1.4 | - |
| Others | 38,094 | 1.3 | - |
| Total | 2,905,687 | 100.0 | 46 |

Source: Regional Council of Veneto

==== Provincial breakdown ====
| Province | DC | PSDI | PSI | PCI |
| Verona | 52.6 | 4.0 | 10.1 | 18.7 |
| Vicenza | 60.7 | 3.9 | 7.8 | 13.5 |
| Padua | 53.9 | 3.2 | 7.9 | 20.6 |
| Treviso | 52.5 | 5.6 | 9.5 | 17.7 |
| Belluno | 42.9 | 10.2 | 10.1 | 20.9 |
| Venice | 38.0 | 3.7 | 11.7 | 31.6 |
| Rovigo | 39.5 | 4.7 | 10.1 | 35.0 |
| Veneto | 50.1 | 4.4 | 9.6 | 21.7 |

Source: Regional Council of Veneto

=== Senate ===
| Party | votes | votes (%) | seats |
|---|---|---|---|
| Christian Democracy | 1,271,730 | 51.3 | 14 |
| Italian Communist Party | 559,493 | 22.6 | 4 |
| Italian Socialist Party | 246,138 | 9.9 | 2 |
| Italian Democratic Socialist Party | 125,180 | 5.1 | 1 |
| Italian Republican Party | 77,906 | 3.1 | - |
| Italian Social Movement | 76,906 | 3.1 | - |
| Italian Liberal Party | 56,480 | 2.3 | - |
| Radical Party–New United Left | 53,586 | 2.2 | - |
| Others | 10,669 | 0.4 | - |
| Total | 2,478,088 | 100.0 | 23 |

Source: Regional Council of Veneto
