= Sergio Berlato =

Italian politician (born 1959)

Sergio Berlato MEP
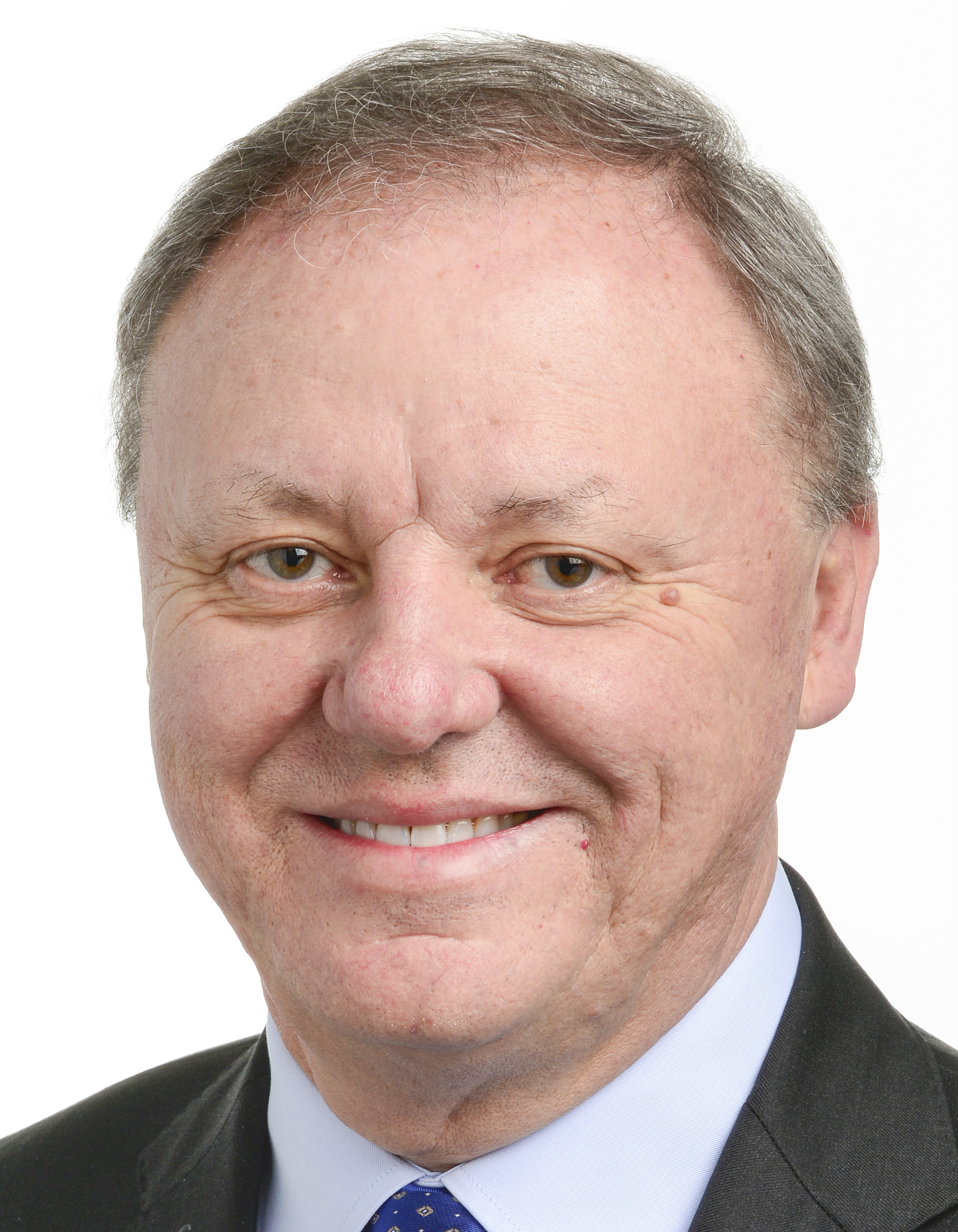

Member of the European Parliament
- Incumbent
- Assumed office February 1, 2020
- In office June 14, 2004 – June 30, 2014
- Constituency: North-East

Personal details
- Born: 27 July 1959 (age 66) Vicenza, Italy
- Party: CPA (1990–1995); AN (1995–2009); PdL (2009–2013); MCCR (since 2012); Forza Italia (2013–2014); Brothers of Italy (since 2014)

Sergio Antonio Berlato (born 27 July 1959) is an Italian politician from Veneto.

== Biography ==
Berlato was born in Vicenza. A long-time representative of the hunters' lobby, in the 1990 regional election Berlato was elected to the Regional Council of Veneto for the Hunting Fishing Environment list (Lista Caccia Pesca Ambiente), which under his leadership gained 1.5% of the votes and 1 seat in Province of Vicenza. Between 1994 and 1995 he also served as regional minister in the government led by Aldo Bottin.

Re-elected in 1995 for National Alliance (Alleanza Nazionale) as regional councilor from the Vicenza's constituency, Berlato was appointed Minister of Agriculture in Galan I Government until 19 July 1999 when he resigned because in June 1999 he became MEP for the first time. In 1999, 2004 and 2009 Berlato was thrice elected to the European Parliament (for National Alliance in 1999 and 2004, for its successor The People of Freedom in 2009). In the EP Berlato was member of the Committee on Agriculture and Rural Development. He was also a substitute of the Committee on the Environment, Public Health and Food Safety, a member of the Delegation for relations with Australia and New Zealand and a substitute of the Delegation for relations with People's China.

In late 2013 when The People of Freedom (Il Popolo della Libertà) was dissolved Berlato became a member of Forza Italia, but after some disputes with Berlusconi he left the party in 2014 and he run for re-election in the 2014 EP election with the Giorgia Meloni's Brothers of Italy (Fratelli d'Italia), but that party failed to pass the 4.00% electoral threshold at national level and Berlato lose his seat. In 2015 Berlato returned with Brothers of Italy to the Regional Council after 16 years. In the 2019 EP election he was candidate for North-East Italy with the Meloni's party associated with European Conservatives and Reformists (ECR), but Berlato took his seat only after Brexit.
