= 1994 European Parliament election in Veneto =

The European Parliament election of 1994 took place on 12 June 1994.

Forza Italia was by far the largest party in Veneto with 31.5%, while Lega Nord came second with 15.7% and the Italian People's Party third with 13.6%.

== Results ==
Party	votes	votes (%)
Forza Italia	881,061	31.5
Lega Nord	437,695	15.7
Italian People's Party	380,910	13.6
Democratic Party of the Left	316,791	11.3
National Alliance	227,186	8.1
Communist Refoundation Party	121,083	4.3
Segni Pact	114,453	4.1
Federation of the Greens	104,180	3.7
Pannella List	53,483	1.9
Valdostan Union*	34,686	1.2
Southern Action League	33,945	1.2
Italian Socialist Party–Democratic Alliance	31,708	1.1
Others	57,420	2.1
Total	2,794,601	100.0

* = In alliance with Lega Autonomia Veneta, the Sardinian Action Party, Union for South Tyrol, etc.
Source: Regional Council of Veneto
