= Francesco Piccolo (disambiguation) =

Francesco Piccolo may refer to:

- Francesco Piccolo (born 1964), Italian writer and screenwriter
- Francesco Piccolo (politician), leader of the Venetian People's Movement
- Francisco María Piccolo (1654–1729), Sicilia Jesuit active in as a missionary in Mexico
