= Massimo Carraro =

Italian politician and professor (born 1959)

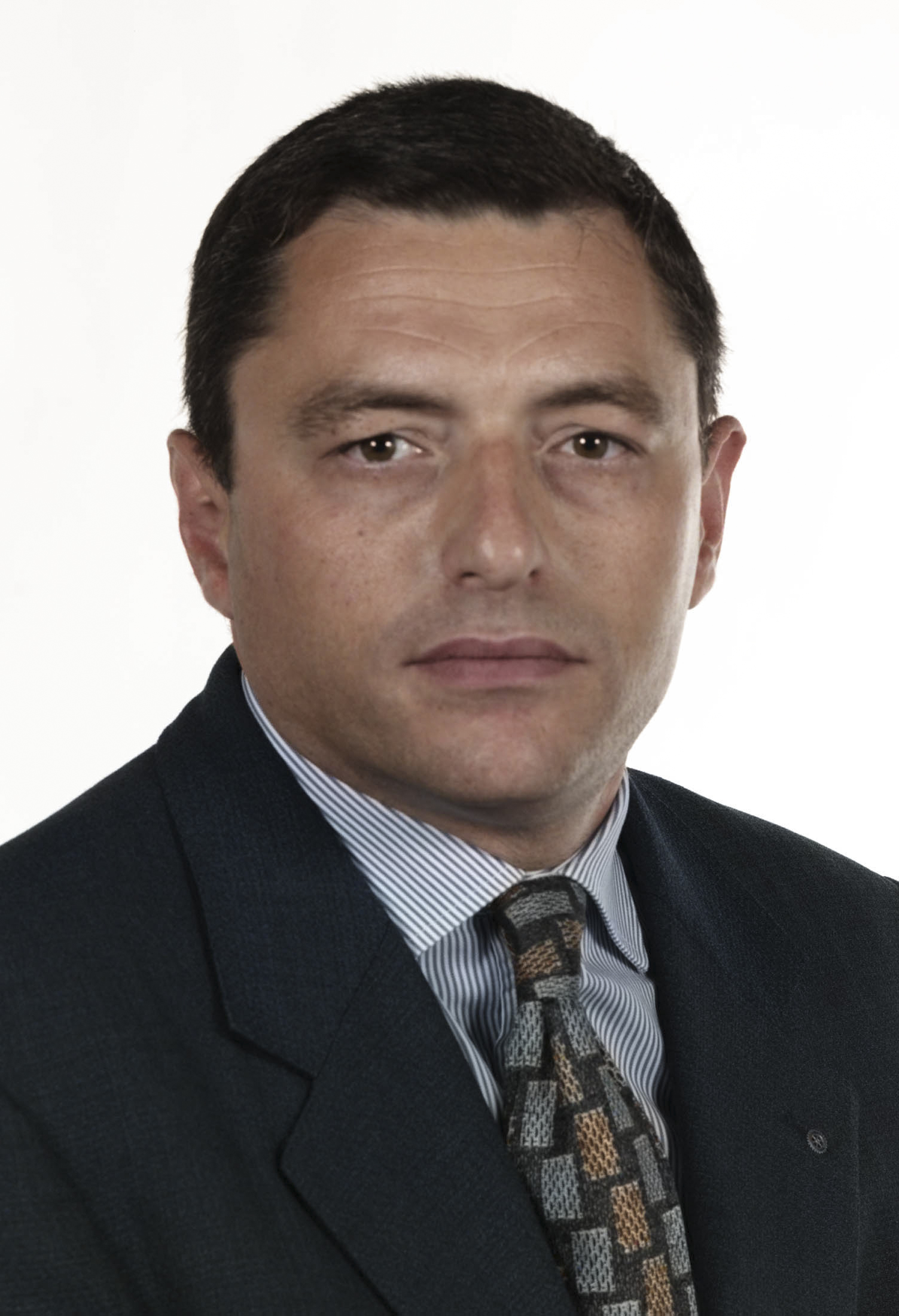
- Carraro in 1999

Member of the European Parliament for Italy
- In office 20 July 1999 – 19 July 2004

Personal details
- Born: March 8, 1959 (age 67) Camposampiero
- Party: Democrats of the Left

Massimo Carraro (born 8 March 1959 in Camposampiero) is an Italian university professor, entrepreneur and politician from Veneto.

From 1999 to 2004 he was a member of the European Parliament for the social-democratic Democrats of the Left, despite not being a member of the party. In the 2005 regional election Carraro was the choice of the centre-left for president, but he was defeated by Giancarlo Galan, who secured his third consecutive term at the head of Veneto. He left his seat in the Regional Council of Veneto and retired from politics in 2006.
