= 1979 European Parliament election in Veneto =

The European Parliament election of 1979 took place on 10 June 1979.

Christian Democracy was by far the largest party in Veneto with 49.1%, while the Italian Communist Party came distant second with 20.3%

== Results ==
Party	votes	votes (%)
Christian Democracy	1,379,947	49.1
Italian Communist Party	569,587	20.3
Italian Socialist Party	328,620	11.7
Italian Democratic Socialist Party	129,002	4.6
Radical Party	101,040	3.6
Italian Liberal Party	97,696	3.5
Italian Social Movement	76,626	2.7
Italian Republican Party	61,666	2.2
Others	67,693	2.4
Total	2,811,877	100.0

Source: Regional Council of Veneto
