= Second Galan government =

The second Galan government, led by president Giancarlo Galan, was the 15th government of Veneto and was in office from 6 June 2000 to 18 May 2005.

Second Galan government
| Office | Name | Party |
|---|---|---|
| President | Giancarlo Galan | FI |
| Vice President | Fabio Gava | FI |
| Minister of Budget, International Relations | Luca Bellotti (until 10 April 2001); Maria Luisa Coppola (since 18 September 2001) | AN |
| Minister of Security and Immigration | Raffaele Zanon | AN |
| Minister of Health | Fabio Gava | FI |
| Minister of Industry | Marino Finozzi | LV |
| Minister of Social Affairs | Antonio De Poli (until 5 August 2004); Sante Bressan (since 12 November 2004) | CCD/UDC; CDU/UDC |
| Minister of Agriculture and Commerce | Giancarlo Conta | FI |
| Minister of Public Works | Massimo Giorgetti | AN |
| Minister of Environment and Transport | Renato Chisso | FI |
| Minister of Culture and Venetian Identity | Ermanno Serrajotto | LV |
| Minister of Tourism and Mountain Affairs | Floriano Pra | FI |
| Minister of Occupation and Local Affairs | Raffaele Grazia | FI |
| Minister of Territorial Affairs | Antonio Padoin | CDU/UDC |

Source: Region of Veneto — The Regional Government from 1970 until today
