= Venetian People's Movement =

Venetian People's Movement Movimento Popolare Veneto
- Leader: Francesco Piccolo
- Founded: March 2008
- Split from: Union of Christian and Centre Democrats
- Ideology: Regionalism; Christian democracy

The Venetian People's Movement (Italian: Movimento Popolare Veneto, MPV) was a Christian-democratic and regionalist political party in Veneto, Italy. Its leader was Francesco Piccolo, long-time regional councillor and minister.

Similarly to the Liberal Populars, MPV was founded in March 2008 by splinters of the Union of Christian and Centre Democrats (UDC) who wanted to continue the alliance with Forza Italia and to participate to the foundation of the regional The People of Freedom (PdL). Their leader was Francesco Piccolo, regional councillor and UDC regional leader at the time of the split. Also Carlo Bernini, former President of Veneto and Minister, and Mauro Fabris, leading member of the UDEUR Populars until March 2008, joined the party.

In the 2010 regional election the party ran in a joint list with Alliance of the Centre (reinforced by the entrance of a new group of splinters led by Iles Braghetto, Flavio Silvestrin, Flavio Frasson and Luigi D'Agrò) and Christian Democracy. Piccolo stood as candidate in the list of the PdL. In the election, the Alliance of the Centre obtained a mere 0.8% of the vote and Piccolo was not elected.

In July 2014 Piccolo was installed councillor as a substitute to Renato Chisso and in the run-up of the 2015 regional election he was a founding member, along with two dissidents from Liga Veneta–Lega Nord, of Venetian Commitment, which can be considered to some extent a continuation of the MPV.
