= Alberto Lembo =

Italian politician (1944–2022)

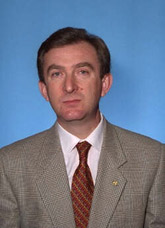
- Lembo in 1996

Member of the Chamber of Deputies of Italy
- In office 15 April 1994 – 29 May 2001
- Constituency: Veneto 2

Personal details
- Born: 28 July 1944 Zevio, Italy
- Died: 22 February 2022 (aged 77) Lonigo, Italy
- Party: LN (1994–1999); AN (1999–2001)
- Education: University of Padua

Alberto Lembo (28 July 1944 – 22 February 2022) was an Italian politician. A member of the Lega Nord and later the National Alliance, he served in the Chamber of Deputies from 1994 to 2001. He died in Lonigo on 22 February 2022, at the age of 77.

== Biography ==
A graduate in political science, he worked as a freelance journalist beginning in 1977. A contributor to various periodicals since 1973, he wrote a large number of articles on historical topics. He was equally active as a lecturer. As a scholar of military history, he curated two exhibitions on military decorations and insignia for the Italian War History Museum in Rovereto, editing the exhibition catalogs.
