= Giorgio Carollo =

Italian politician

Giorgio Carollo MEP

Member of the European Parliament
- Incumbent
- Assumed office 14 June 2004
- Constituency: North-East

Personal details
- Born: 30 March 1944 (age 82) Vicenza, Italy
- Party: Forza Italia

Giorgio Carollo (born 30 March 1944 in Vicenza) is an Italian politician.

He is a Member of the European Parliament for North-East, elected with the Forza Italia, part of the European People's Party and sits on the European Parliament's Committee on Fisheries and its Committee on Legal Affairs. He is a substitute for the Committee on Agriculture and Rural Development and the Committee on International Trade.

A long-time member of Christian Democracy, he later joined Forza Italia, of which he was regional coordinator for Veneto from 1998 to 2005.

In 2005, he left Forza Italia and formed his own political group, Veneto for the European People's Party. In the 2007 provincial election of Vicenza, he is candidate for president with the support of parties both from the centre-left and the centre-right: Italy of Values, UDEUR, Liga Fronte Veneto, Christian Democracy, some citizen' lists and his own Veneto for the EPP, which is part of the majority supporting the regional government of Giancarlo Galan in the Regional Council.

== Education ==
- Graduate in business studies

== See also ==
- 2004 European Parliament election in Italy
