= Nicola Atalmi =

Italian politician

Nicola Atalmi (born 10 December 1967 in Treviso) is an Italian politician and a former leader of the Party of Italian Communists in Veneto.

When he was 18, Atalmi joined Proletarian Democracy and, later, the Communist Refoundation Party of which he was a member until 1998, when he switched to the newly formed Party of Italian Communists. In 2004 he entered the Regional Council of Veneto, replacing Severino Galante. In the 2005 regional election he was elected for a full term in the council, but was not re-elected in 2010. Atalmi was later active in Left Ecology Freedom.
