= Renato Chisso =

Italian politician from Veneto

Renato Chisso (born 28 July 1954 in Quarto d'Altino) is an Italian politician from Veneto.

A long-time member of the Italian Socialist Party, he joined Forza Italia in 1994. He was first elected to the Regional Council of Veneto in 1995 and re-elected in 2000, 2005 and 2010. Between 2000 and 2005 he was regional minister of Environment and Transports in Galan II Government. After that, he was minister of Infrastructures and Transports, in Galan III Government (2005–2010) and Zaia I Government (2010–2014).

In June 2014 he was jailed for corruption as a part of a judicial investigation about the MOSE Project and thus resigned from minister.
