= Sandro Sandri =

Italian politician

Sandro Sandri (Verona, 18 February 1954) is a Venetist politician. He was a member of Liga Veneta–Lega Nord.

After earning a degree in engineering, Sandri worked as a consultant specializing in trademarks and patents. In 1997, he joined Liga Veneta. In the 2005 regional election, he was elected to the Regional Council of Veneto, but his election was declared invalid, and Sandri stepped down a year later. Between 2008 and 2010, he was regional minister of Health in the Galan III Government. He was elected again to the Regional Council in 2010.
