= Massimo Giorgetti =

Italian politician (born 1959)

Massimo Giorgetti (born 20 October 1959 in Verona) is an Italian politician from Veneto.

Giorgetti joined the Italian Social Movement in 1975 and served as the party's provincial secretary in Verona. In 1995 he joined National Alliance (AN).

Five times elected to the Regional Council of Veneto (1995, 2000, 2010, 2005 and 2015) for AN (1995, 2000 and 2005), The People of Freedom (2010) and finally Forza Italia (2015), he was regional minister for 20 consecutive years: minister of Environment in Galan I Government (1995–2000), minister of Public Works in Galan II Government (2000–2005), Galan I Government (2005–2010) and Zaia I Government (2010–2015). From 2015 to 2020 he was Vice President of the Regional Council. Having joined the Brothers of Italy in 2019, he stood for re-election in the 2020 regional election, but was not elected, ending 25 years in the Regional Council.

He is the elder brother of Alberto Giorgetti, who was regional leader of National Alliance, has been a long-time member of the Chamber of Deputies and served as undersecretary of Economy and Finance to minister Giulio Tremonti in Berlusconi IV Cabinet.
