= Maria Luisa Coppola =

Italian politician from Veneto

Maria Luisa Coppola (born 2 November 1960 in Vicenza) is an Italian politician from Veneto.

A member of National Alliance (and, prior to that, of the Italian Social Movement), in September 2001 she was appointed regional minister for the Budget, replacing Luca Bellotti, in Galan II Government. In the 2005 regional election she was first elected to the Regional Council of Veneto and, consequently, re-appointed minister for the Budget in Galan III Government. Having been re-eledcted in 2010, she was appointed regional minister of Economic Development in Zaia I Government.
