= Mariangelo Foggiato =

Italian politician

Mariangelo Foggiato (Possagno, 19 April 1954) is a Venetist politician.

Having joined Liga Veneta–Lega Nord, he was elected to the Regional Council of Veneto in 1995. However, he left the party in 1998, when he founded Liga Veneta Repubblica (LVR) along with Fabrizio Comencini. He was national president of LVR until 1999, when he left the party, together with Senator Antonio Serena, founding the Liga dei Veneti, in dissent on the alliance with Forza Italia prospected by Fabrizio Comencini, LVR national secretary.

Foggiato then abandoned politics until 2004, when returned to political activity as member of North-East Project (PNE), of which he was a founder (along with Giorgio Panto) and secretary. He was elected again to the Regional Council in 2005. The new party performed well in the Province of Treviso, where it won 15.6% of the vote. After Panto's death, he became the leader of the party. In 2010 he was re-elected to the Council with the North-East Union, a coalition comprising PNE, LVR and other Venetist parties.

In August 2014 Foggiato announced he was leaving the Regional Council because of "strictly private matters, involving me and my family". This did not stop him to be one of the main proponents and supporters of the Independence We Veneto coalition in the 2015 regional election.

In his three terms as regional councillor, Foggiato was actively involved in the efforts of transforming Veneto into an autonomous region.
