= Raffaele Grazia =

Italian politician

Raffaele Grazia (born 23 October 1966 in Bassano del Grappa) is an Italian politician from Veneto.

A member of Christian Democracy, in 1994 he joined the United Christian Democrats. Elected to the Regional Council of Veneto in 2000 for Forza Italia (party which he had joined in 1998), he was regional minister of Labour in Galan II Government. A close ally of Giorgio Carollo, he left Forza Italia in 2006 and joined Veneto for the European People's Party. In 2010 he was re-elected to the Council for the Union of the Centre.

Grazia is married with Barbara Degani, who served as President of the Province of Padua for The People of Freedom.
