= Veneto for the European People's Party =

Veneto for the EPP Veneto per il PPE
- Leader: Giorgio Carollo
- Founded: 2005
- Headquarters: via della Meccanica, 22; 36100 Vicenza
- Membership (2006): 18,000
- Ideology: Christian democracy Pro-Europeanism
- National affiliation: Union of the Centre
- European Parliament group: EPP–ED (2006–09)

Website
- http://www.venetoperilppe.it

Veneto for the EPP (Italian: Veneto per il PPE, VPPE) was a regional Christian democratic political party based in Veneto, Italy.

== History ==
VPPE was founded in 2005 as a trans-party political movement by Giorgio Carollo, both members of Forza Italia and formerly members of Christian Democracy, along with members of Forza Italia, Democracy is Freedom – The Daisy (DL), the Union of Christian and Centre Democrats (UDC) and the Union of Democrats for Europe (UDEUR).

At the beginning, VPPE members could be part of both their original party and of VPPE. Then the political movement was organised as an independent party, but some members, including Renzo Marangon, regional minister of Territorial Affairs, continued to have a double affiliation. In 2006, Raffaele Grazia was the only one of the original group to leave Forza Italia in the Regional Council, thus forming the "Veneto for the EPP" group.

In the May 2007 provincial election of Vicenza, Giorgio Carollo was candidate for president with the support of parties from both the centre-left and the centre-right: Italy of Values, UDEUR, Liga Fronte Veneto, Christian Democracy, some citizen lists and his own Veneto for the EPP, which is part of the majority supporting the regional government of Giancarlo Galan in the Regional Council. He scored 9.9%, while VPPE got the 3.5% and elected 2 provincial councillors.

Even if the result of Vicenza was a little disappointing for VPPE, it led to an awkward federation with Christian Democracy and Liga Fronte Veneto. The pact between the three parties, which could become a major political actor in Veneto, was signed in October 2007 by Giorgio Carollo, Raffaele Grazia, Giuseppe Pizza and Fabrizio Comencini. Following this agreement, Carollo became leader of the Christian Democracy in the northeast, while Grazia received the mandate of coordinator of the coalition for Veneto. However, the coalition was soon disbanded.

The party supported the Union of the Centre (UdC) of Pier Ferdinando Casini in the 2008 general election and Carollo was a candidate for the UdC in the North-East Italy constituency in the 2009 European Parliament election.

== Leadership ==
- President: Giorgio Carollo
- Coordinator: Raffaele Grazia
