= Fabio Gava =

Italian politician (born 1949)

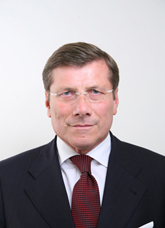
Fabio Gava

Fabio Gava (born 26 October 1949 in Godega di Sant'Urbano) is an Italian politician from Veneto.

A member of the Italian Liberal Party (PLI) since 1967, he joined Forza Italia (FI) in 1993 following his long-time friend Giancarlo Galan. Elected to the Regional Council of Veneto in 1995, he was floor leader of Forza Italia and regional minister of Budget in Galan I Government. Between 2000 and 2005 he was Vice President of Veneto and regional minister of Health in Galan II Government. From 2005 through 2008 he was regional minister of Economics in Galan III Government.

At the 2008 general election Gava was elected to the Chamber of Deputies for The People of Freedom (PdL), the successor of FI. On 14 October 2011 Gava voted against Silvio Berlusconi's government during a vote of confidence and de facto suspended himself from the PdL. He officially left the party in May 2012.
