= Giancarlo Conta =

Italian architect and politician

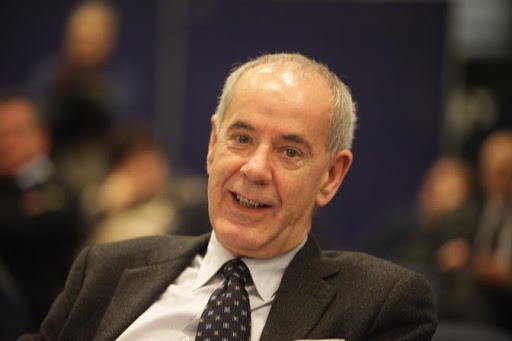

Regional Councilor
- In office 10 April 2010 – 29 June 2015

Regional Minister of Environment
- In office 19 May 2005 – 23 March 2010

Regional Minister of Agriculture
- In office 6 June 2000 – 18 May 2005

Personal details
- Born: 9 October 1949 (age 76) Verona, Italy
- Party: Forza Italia (1994–2009) (2013–present)
- Other political affiliations: The People of Freedom (2009–2013)
- Education: Iuav University of Venice

Giancarlo Conta (born 9 October 1949 in Verona) is an Italian architect and politician. He specializes in the restoration of architectural heritage, historic buildings, urban plans and in the design of sports facilities both in Italy and abroad.

He joined Forza Italia in 1993. Elected to the Regional Council of Veneto in 2000, he was Regional Minister of Agriculture in Galan II Government between 2000 and 2005. From 2005 to 2010 he was Minister of Environment in Galan III Government. He was re-elected to the Council in 2010 in Zaia I Government.

== Biography ==
Graduated in architecture at Iuav University of Venice.

He lives in Verona, is married and has two children.

== Professional activity ==
Specialized in restoration, he works in the building recovery sector, especially in historic centers, designing and carrying out numerous interventions in ancient buildings. He carries out important projects both in the executive sector, as headquarters of national banks, and in the commercial one, creating supermarkets and shops. There are also numerous interventions in the sector of sports facilities, multipurpose and aquatic centers throughout Northern Italy.

At the forefront he participates in working groups, especially in the building recovery sector. The collaboration with Prof. Arch. Benevolo for the realization of the General Variation in the historic center of Verona is famous. He participates as a technical member in ministerial commissions, such as with the Ministry of Commerce and the Ministry of Public Works. Numerous participations as a technical member of the C.O.N.I.

In 1996, as President of Verona Mercato S.p.a, he began work on the new Agri-food Center of Verona, the nerve center of the city's economic future. Numerous restoration and building recovery works continue and the doors open for a new project, the realization of a new commercial complex adjacent to the Valerio Catullo Airport in Verona.

== Political activity ==
He started political activity in Forza Italia in 1993, setting the stage for the foundation of Silvio Berlusconi’s new party. In 1994 he became leader of Forza Italia in the city Council in Verona, being elected as Councillor for Town Planning. In 1996 he was appointed president of Verona Mercato spa, starting the construction of the new Agri-food Center. In October 1998 he became provincial coordinator of Forza Italia in Verona.

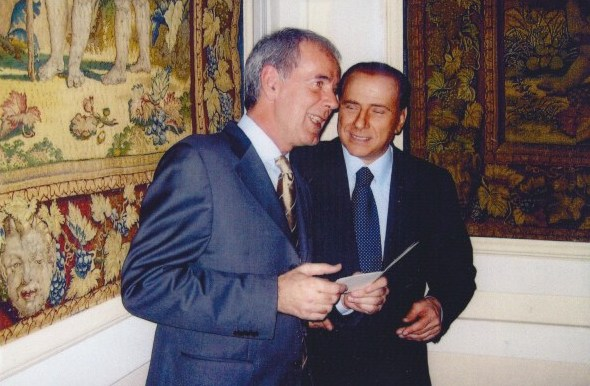
Giancarlo Conta with Silvio Berlusconi

Elected to the Regional Council of Veneto in 2000, he was Regional Minister for trade, fairs, markets and agriculture in the seventh legislature. Reconfirmed in 2005, he was Regional Minister for the environment until 2010, his contribution, among others, was crucial in water reclamation and irrigation modernization interventions in favor of mountain communities and reclamation consortia throughout the Veneto. In 2010 he was reconfirmed in the Veneto Regional Council of Veneto in the ninth legislature.

In 2014, he joined the board of directors of the Verona-Villafranca Valerio Catullo Airport.

In 2017, he officially presented at Palazzo Barbieri at the presence of the Mayor of Verona Federico Sboarina and the Councilor for Sport Filippo Rando, he became President of the AGMS of Verona Women's Football.

=== Controversies ===
Accused of omission in official acts for the pollution of most of the Venetian cities by Pm10, the judgment of 19 July 2011 of the Court of Venice stated his absolution fully acquitted, for the crime challenged when he was the Environmental Regional Minister of the Veneto Region.
