= 2000 Venetian regional election =

Italian regional election

- 16 April 2000

All 60 seats to the Regional Council
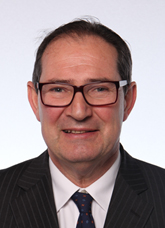

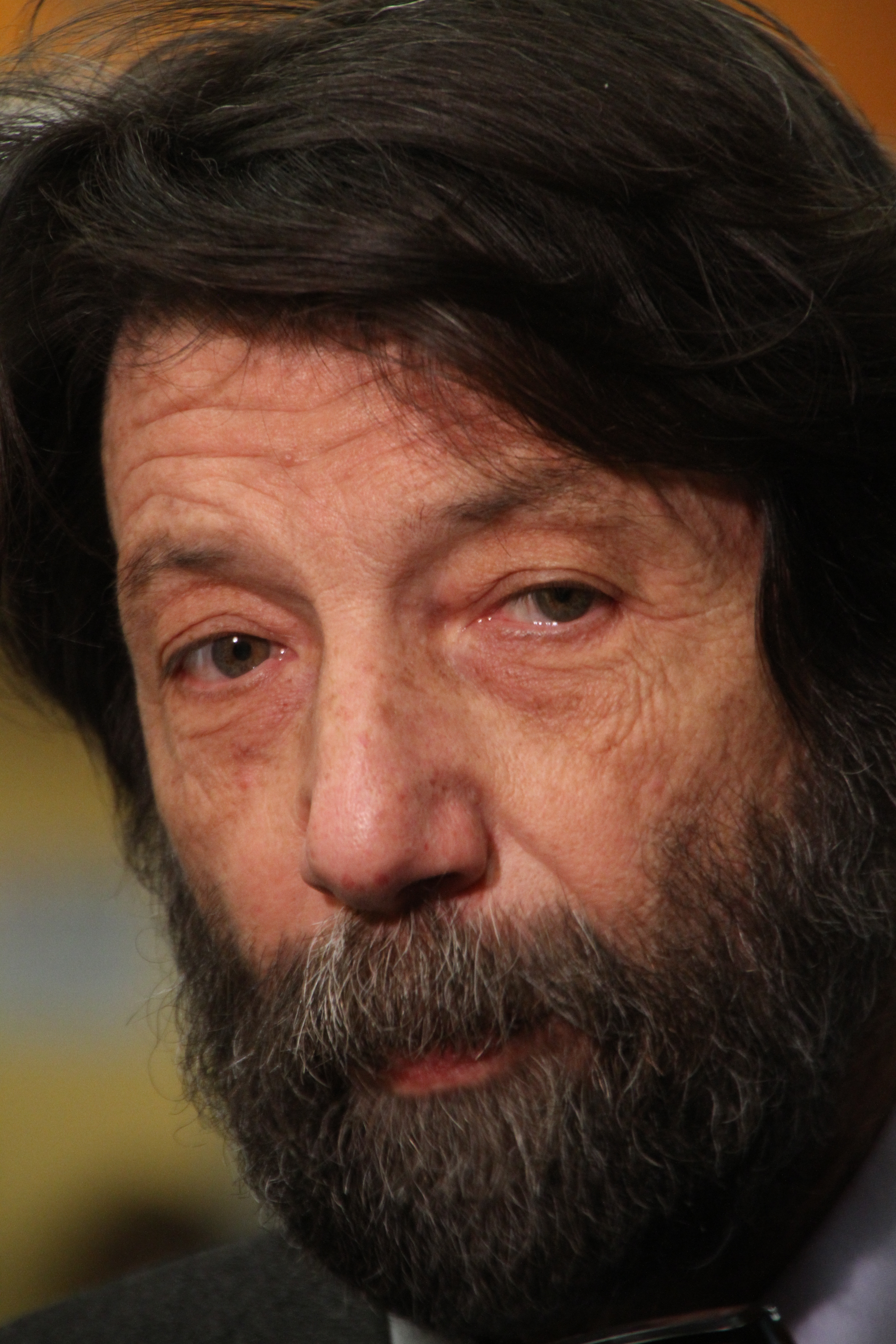
	Majority party	Minority party
Leader	Giancarlo Galan	Massimo Cacciari
Party	Forza Italia	Democrats
Alliance	Pole for Freedoms	The Olive Tree
Seats won	37	23
Seat change	▼8	▲3
Popular vote	1,484,585	1,032,255
Percentage	54.96%	38.22%
Swing	▼0.72%	▲5.87%
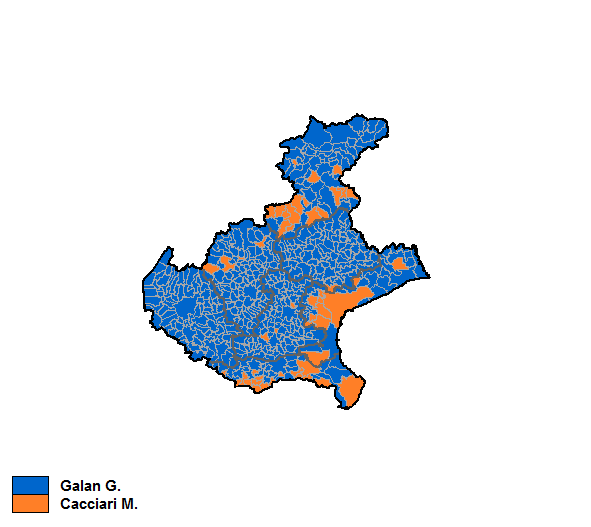
President before election
Giancarlo Galan
Forza Italia
Subsequent President
Giancarlo Galan
Forza Italia

The Venetian regional election of 2000 took place on 16 April 2000.

Giancarlo Galan (Forza Italia, Pole for Freedoms) was re-elected for the third time President of the Region by a landslide over the centre-left candidate Massimo Cacciari (The Democrats).

Forza Italia, this time in alliance also with the Northern League, had its best result ever and was by far the largest party in the election, receiving 30.3% of the regional vote.

== Electoral system ==
Regional elections in Veneto were ruled by the "Tatarella law" (approved in 1995), which provided for a mixed electoral system: four fifths of the regional councilors were elected in provincial constituencies by proportional representation, using the largest remainder method with a droop quota and open lists, while the residual votes and the unassigned seats were grouped into a "single regional constituency", where the whole ratios and the highest remainders were divided with the Hare method among the provincial party lists; one fifth of the council seats instead was reserved for regional lists and assigned with a majoritarian system: the leader of the regional list that scored the highest number of votes was elected to the presidency of the Region while the other candidates were elected regional councilors.

A threshold of 3% had been established for the provincial lists, which, however, could still have entered the regional council if the regional list to which they were connected had scored at least 5% of valid votes.

The panachage was also allowed: the voter can indicate a candidate for the presidency but prefer a provincial list connected to another candidate.

== Parties and candidates ==
Political party or alliance	Constituent lists	Previous result		Candidate
Political party or alliance	Constituent lists	Votes (%)	Seats	Candidate
Pole for Freedoms	Forza Italia	24.0	15	Giancarlo Galan
Pole for Freedoms	Northern League – Venetian League	16.7	9	Giancarlo Galan
Pole for Freedoms	National Alliance	10.7	6	Giancarlo Galan
Pole for Freedoms	Christian Democratic Centre	3.6	3	Giancarlo Galan
Pole for Freedoms	United Christian Democrats	—N/a	—N/a	Giancarlo Galan
Pole for Freedoms	Socialist Party	—N/a	—N/a	Giancarlo Galan
Pole for Freedoms	The Liberals Sgarbi	—N/a	—N/a	Giancarlo Galan
Pole for Freedoms	Venetian Democratic Union	—N/a	—N/a	Giancarlo Galan
The Olive Tree	Democrats of the Left	16.5	9	Massimo Cacciari
The Olive Tree	Communist Refoundation Party	5.0	2	Massimo Cacciari
The Olive Tree	Federation of the Greens	4.0	2	Massimo Cacciari
The Olive Tree	Italian Democratic Socialists – Italian Republican Party	0.5	–	Massimo Cacciari
The Olive Tree	Cacciari List (incl. PPI, Dem, RI)	—N/a	—N/a	Massimo Cacciari
The Olive Tree	Party of Italian Communists	—N/a	—N/a	Massimo Cacciari
Bonino List		1.2	–	Marco Cappato
Venetians of Europe		—N/a	—N/a	Fabrizio Comencini
Marco Polo Front		—N/a	—N/a	Fabio Padovan

== Results ==
16 April 2000 Venetian regional election results
Candidates	Votes	%	Seats	Parties	Votes	%	Seat
Giancarlo Galan	1,484,585	54.96	6				
Giancarlo Galan	1,484,585	54.96	6	Forza Italia	696,358	30.38	17
Giancarlo Galan	1,484,585	54.96	6	Northern League – Venetian League	274,472	11.97	6
Giancarlo Galan	1,484,585	54.96	6	National Alliance	225,194	9.82	5
Giancarlo Galan	1,484,585	54.96	6	United Christian Democrats	102,967	4.49	2
Giancarlo Galan	1,484,585	54.96	6	Christian Democratic Centre	53,580	2.34	1
Giancarlo Galan	1,484,585	54.96	6	Socialist Party	16,249	0.71	–
Giancarlo Galan	1,484,585	54.96	6	The Liberals Sgarbi	12,413	0.54	–
Giancarlo Galan	1,484,585	54.96	6	Venetian Democratic Union	1,730	0.08	–
Giancarlo Galan	1,484,585	54.96	6	Total	1,382,963	60.33	31
Massimo Cacciari	1,032,255	38.22	1				
Massimo Cacciari	1,032,255	38.22	1	Cacciari List	312,347	13.63	9
Massimo Cacciari	1,032,255	38.22	1	Democrats of the Left	282,644	12.33	8
Massimo Cacciari	1,032,255	38.22	1	Communist Refoundation Party	68,375	2.98	2
Massimo Cacciari	1,032,255	38.22	1	Federation of the Greens	53,464	2.33	1
Massimo Cacciari	1,032,255	38.22	1	Italian Democratic Socialists – Italian Republican Party	29,355	1.28	1
Massimo Cacciari	1,032,255	38.22	1	Party of Italian Communists	23,349	1.02	1
Massimo Cacciari	1,032,255	38.22	1	Total	769,534	33.57	22
Fabrizio Comencini	71,878	2.66	–	Venetians of Europe	56,448	2.46	–
Marco Cappato	66,457	2.36	–	Bonino List	54,844	2.39	–
Fabio Padovan	45,975	1.70	–	Marco Polo Front	28,568	1.25	–
Total candidates	2,701,150	100.00	7	Total parties	2,292,357	100.00	53
Source: Ministry of the Interior

== Aftermath ==
After the election, Giancarlo Galan formed his second government, while Enrico Cavaliere (Liga Veneta) was elected President of the Regional Council. Forza Italia had the lion share in the government, including the posts of President, Vice President and Minister of Health.

Second Galan government
Office	Name	Party
President	Giancarlo Galan	FI
Vice President	Fabio Gava	FI
Minister of Budget, International Relations	Luca Bellotti (until 10 April 2001); Maria Luisa Coppola (since 18 September 2001)	AN
Minister of Security and Immigration	Raffaele Zanon	AN
Minister of Health	Fabio Gava	FI
Minister of Industry	Marino Finozzi	LV
Minister of Social Affairs	Antonio De Poli (until 5 August 2004); Sante Bressan (since 12 November 2004)	CCD/UDC; CDU/UDC
Minister of Agriculture and Commerce	Giancarlo Conta	FI
Minister of Public Works	Massimo Giorgetti	AN
Minister of Environment and Transport	Renato Chisso	FI
Minister of Culture and Venetian Identity	Ermanno Serrajotto	LV
Minister of Tourism and Mountain Affairs	Floriano Pra	FI
Minister of Occupation and Local Affairs	Raffaele Grazia	FI
Minister of Territorial Affairs	Antonio Padoin	CDU/UDC

Source: Region of Veneto — The Regional Government from 1970 until today
