= Iles Braghetto =

Italian politician

Iles Braghetto MEP

Member of the European Parliament
- Incumbent
- Assumed office 14 June 2004
- Constituency: North-East

Personal details
- Born: 9 March 1953 (age 73) San Giorgio delle Pertiche, Veneto, Italy
- Party: Christian Democracy, United Christian Democrats, Union of Christian and Centre Democrats, Alliance of the Centre

Iles Braghetto (born 9 March 1953 in San Giorgio delle Pertiche) is an Italian politician from Veneto.

Braghetto was a religion teacher in upper secondary schools since 1976 and graduated in modern literature in 1984.

Since the years of his youth he was a member of Christian Democracy. Between 1980 and 1985 he was town councillor and deputy mayor of Padua. In 1995 he was elected to the Regional Council of Veneto for the United Christian Democrats. From 1995 through 2000 he was regional minister of Health in Galan I Government. From 2003 to 2005 he was chairman of the Committee overseeing planning, the budget and institutional affairs.

In 2005 he entered the European Parliament representing the Union of Christian and Centre Democrats (UDC). During his tenure he was vice-chairman of the Committee on Fisheries and member of the Committee on Employment and Social Affairs, the delegation for relations with Iran, and the delegation for relations with Canada.

After failing re-election to the EP in 2009, he left the UDC and was involved in the Alliance of the Centre.
