= Province of Venice =

Former province of Veneto, Italy

Coordinates: 45°27′N 12°24′E

- Province (1866–2014)
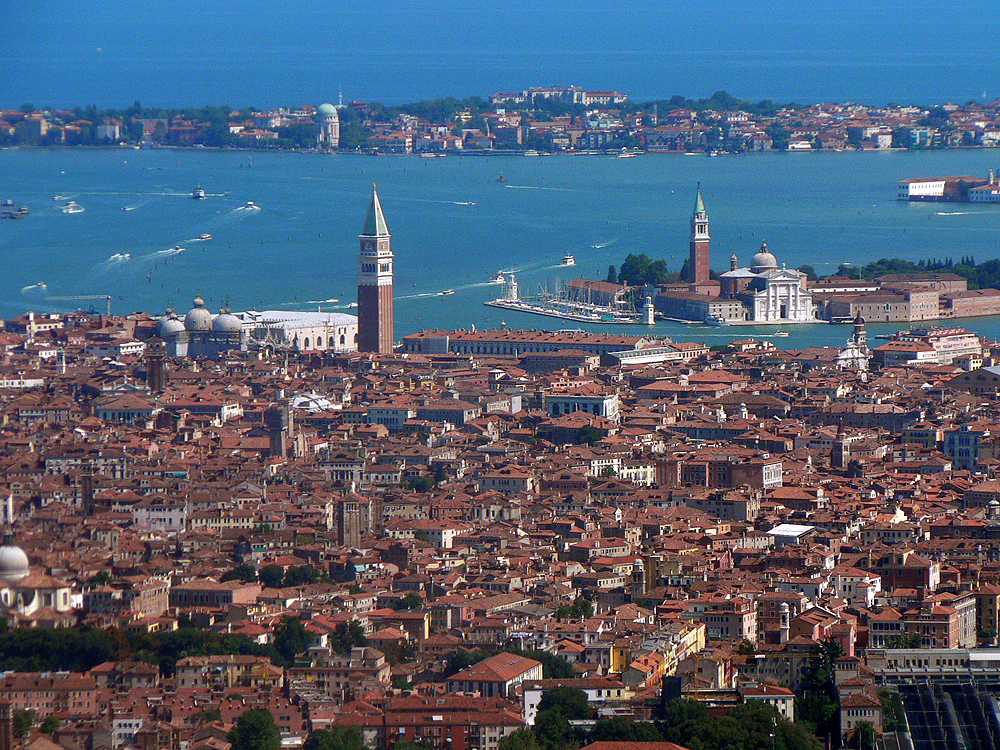

- Flag Coat of arms

- Map highlighting the location of the former province of Venice in Italy
- Country: Italy
- Region: Veneto
- Capital(s): Venice
- Comuni: 44

Area
  - Total: 2,467 km^{2} (953 sq mi)

Population (2011)
  - Total: 846,962
  - Density: 343.3/km^{2} (889.2/sq mi)
- Time zone: UTC+1 (CET)
  - Summer (DST): UTC+2 (CEST)
- Postal code: 30010, 30014-30016, 30020-30039
- Telephone prefix: 041, 049, 0421, 0422, 0426, 0431
- Vehicle registration: VE
- ISTAT: 027

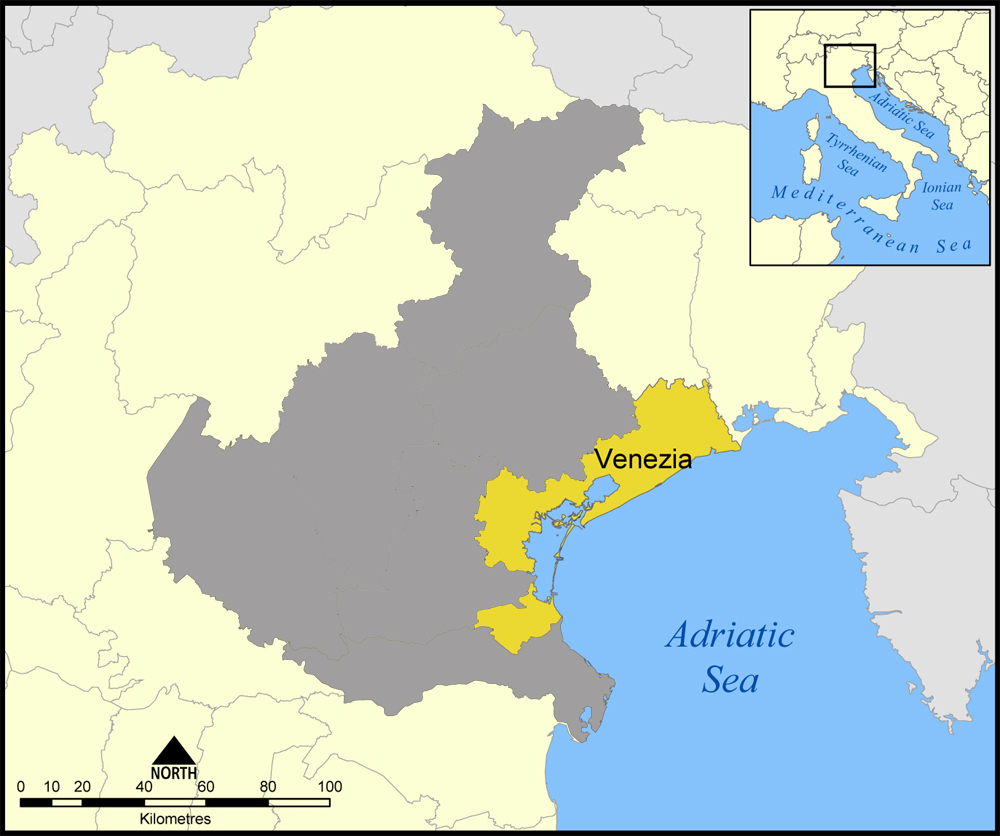
Map of the province of Venice

The province of Venice (Italian: provincia di Venezia) was a province in the Veneto region of Italy. Its capital was the city of Venice. It had an area of 2,467 km^{2}, and a total population of 836,916 (2021). The province became the Metropolitan City of Venice by 1 January 2015.

== Demography ==
Statistics recorded since 1871 show that the population of the province of Venice increased from some 341,000 inhabitants in 1871 to almost 847,000 in 2011. It rose steadily in each of the ten-year statistical periods until 1981 (reaching 838,794 inhabitants) whereafter there were declines until 2001 when the population dipped to 809,586. Finally, there was an increase of 4.6% in the ten-year period from 2001 to 2011 when the number of inhabitants reached 846,962.

The average age per inhabitant was 44.8 years in 2011, up from 35.6 years in 1981. In 2012, there were 72,284 foreigners residents in the province (up from 44,996 in 2006), mainly from Romania, Moldova and Albania, representing 8.5% of the total population. In the academic year 2012 to 2013, 23,677 students were enrolled at university of which 61.8% were women and 38.2% male. The most popular fields of study were economics, foreign languages, letters and philosophy, and architecture.

=== Comuni ===
There were 44 comuni (sing.: comune) in the province . In 2005, the main comuni by population were:

Comune	Population
Venice	270,662
Chioggia	51,231
San Donà di Piave	40,899
Mira	37,737
Mirano	26,126
Portogruaro	25,162
Spinea	24,698
Jesolo	23,705
Martellago	19,904
Scorzè	18,626
Santa Maria di Sala	15,521
Cavarzere	15,319
Noale	15,237
Dolo	14,649
Marcon	12,969
Eraclea	12,653
Cavallino-Treporti	12,444
Santo Stino di Livenza	12,386
Camponogara	11,858
Caorle	11,847
Salzano	11,797
San Michele al Tagliamento	11,778
Musile di Piave	10,642
Concordia Sagittaria	10,641

== Economy ==
Tourism was an important contributor to the provincial economy with over 26,000 establishments (including 1,277 hotels) offering overnight accommodation and accounting for a total of 34 million tourist nights spent in 2012 (down slightly from 2011 but substantially higher than some 29 million nights in 2002).

The gross domestic product of the province was 25 million euro in 2010, down slightly from 25.973 million euro in 2007. In 2012, the service sector represented 73% of the economy, while industry covered 19%, construction 7% and agriculture just 1%. Footwear represented 9.6% of provincial exports, petroleum products 7.2% and machinery 6.7%.

== See also ==
- Metropolitan City of Venice
