= Giancarlo Galan =

Italian politician (born 1956)

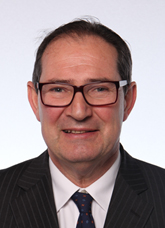

President of Veneto
- In office 26 May 1995 – 10 April 2010
- Preceded by: Aldo Bottin
- Succeeded by: Luca Zaia

Minister of Cultural Heritage and Activities
- In office 23 March 2011 – 16 November 2011
- Prime Minister: Silvio Berlusconi
- Preceded by: Sandro Bondi
- Succeeded by: Lorenzo Ornaghi

Minister of Agriculture
- In office 16 April 2010 – 23 March 2011
- Prime Minister: Silvio Berlusconi
- Preceded by: Luca Zaia
- Succeeded by: Francesco Saverio Romano

Member of the Chamber of Deputies
- In office 15 March 2013 – 27 April 2016
- In office 15 April 1994 – 22 June 1995
- Constituency: Veneto

Personal details
- Born: 10 September 1956 (age 69) Padua, Italy
- Party: FI (since 2013)
- Other political affiliations: PLI (1970s–1980s); FI (1994–2009); PdL (2009–2013)
- Height: 1.88 m (6 ft 2 in)
- Occupation: politician

Giancarlo Galan (born 10 September 1956) is an Italian politician.

== Career ==
Born in Padua, Galan was an activist of the Italian Liberal Party in the 1970s and the 1980s. He was not fully active in politics until he joined Forza Italia since its foundation in 1994. In the same year, he was elected to Italy's Chamber of Deputies.

In 1995, Galan ran successfully for president of Veneto. He was re-elected in 2000 and 2005. He did not stand for re-election in 2010, when the centre-right coalition supported Luca Zaia of Liga Veneta–Lega Nord for president. He was Minister of Agriculture in Silvio Berlusconi's fourth cabinet from 2010 to 2011, filling the place vacated by Zaia. He later served as Minister of Cultural Heritage and Activities for a few months in 2011. In 2013, he was elected to the Chamber of Deputies and became chairman of the Culture Committee.

In June 2014, a tribunal in Venice asked the Italian Parliament for an authorization to proceed against Galan for bribery, extortion, and money laundering in the framework of the inquiry about the MOSE Project. The Parliament approved the request; Galan was led to a prison in Milan, and later granted house arrest in his villa near Padua.

Assembly seats
Preceded by Title jointly held	Member of the Italian Chamber of Deputies; XII Legislature; 1994–1995	Succeeded by Title jointly held
Preceded by Title jointly held	Member of the Italian Chamber of Deputies; XVII Legislature; 2013–	Incumbent
Preceded by Title jointly held	Member of the Italian Senate; XV Legislature; 2006	Succeeded by Title jointly held
Preceded by Title jointly held	Member of the Italian Senate; XVI Legislature; 2008	Succeeded by Title jointly held
Political offices
Preceded by Sandro Bondi	Italian Minister of Culture; 2011	Succeeded by Lorenzo Ornaghi
