= Politics of Veneto =

Italian regional politics

The politics of Veneto, a region of Italy, takes place in the framework of an "anomalous presidential" representative democracy or prime-ministerial system with an executive presidency, whereby the President of Veneto is the head of government, and of a pluriform multi-party system. Executive power is exercised by the Regional Government. Legislative power is vested in both the government and the Regional Council.

Veneto traces back to the history of the Republic of Venice or Venetian Republic and its current formed is envisioned by the Italian Constitution of 1948 and was formally instituted as a region in 1970.

The Statute of Veneto was first promulgated in 1971 and largely rewritten in 2012. Article 1 defines Veneto as an "autonomous region, according to the present Statute, in harmony with the Italian Constitution and the principles of the legal system of the European Union", "constituted by the Venetian people and the territories of the provinces of Belluno, Padua, Rovigo, Treviso, Venice, Verona and Vicenza", with Venice as capital city, and maintaining "bonds with Venetians around the world". Article 2 sets forth the principle of the "self-government of the Venetian people" and mandates the Region to "promote the historical identity of the Venetian people and its civilisation".

Veneto is home to Venetian nationalism or Venetism, a political movement demanding more autonomy and, to some extent, independence for the region. On 22 October 2017 the so-called "autonomy referendum" took place in Veneto. Citizens were asked whether they wanted "further forms and special conditions of autonomy to be attributed to the Region of Veneto". 57.2% of Venetians participated and 98.1% voted "yes".

The president of Veneto is Alberto Stefani of Liga Veneta–Lega, by far the largest party in the Regional Council.

== Political history ==
Prior to the rise of Fascism, most of the deputies elected in Veneto were part of the liberal establishment (see Historical Right, Historical Left and Liberals), which governed Italy for decades, but also the main opposition parties, namely the Radical Party and the Italian Socialist Party, had a good sway among Venetian voters. In the 1919 general election, the first held with proportional representation, the Catholic-inspired Italian People's Party came first with 42.6% (gaining at least 10% more than in any other region) and the Socialists were in second place with 36.2%. In the 1924 general election, which led Italy to dictatorship, Veneto was one of the few regions, along with Lombardy and Piedmont, which did not return an absolute majority to the National Fascist Party.

From World War II to 1994 Veneto was the heartland of Christian Democracy, which polled 60.5% in the 1953 general election and steadily above 50% until the late 1970s, and led the Regional Government from its establishment in 1970 to 1993. In the 1990s Veneto became a stronghold of the centre-right Pole/House of Freedoms coalition, which governed the region from 1995 to 2010 under Giancarlo Galan of Forza Italia. In 2010 Galan was replaced by Luca Zaia of Liga Veneta–Lega Nord, who obtained a hefty and record-breaking 60.2% of the vote and whose coalition government included The People of Freedom/Forza Italia and, since 2013, the New Centre-Right; Liga Veneta was the largest party with 35.2% of the vote. Zaia and Liga Veneta were confirmed in 2015, with a reduced but more cohesive majority, due to the split of Tosi List for Veneto and the diminishment of Forza Italia: Zaia won 50.1% of the vote, while Liga Veneta a thumping 40.9% (combined score of party list and Zaia's personal list), largely ahead of the opposition Democratic Party's 20.5%. Zaia and Liga Veneta were again confirmed in 2020: the first won a record-breaking 76.8% of the vote, while the party 61.5% (combined score of party list and Zaia's personal list). In 2025 Alberto Stefani of Liga Veneta was elected president with 64.4% of the vote, succeeding Zaia, who was term-limited and led the party in all seven provinces, winning 36.3% of the vote (Zaia's personal list did not run because of coalition agreements with the Brothers of Italy, Liga Veneta's junior partner in the regional government and Lega's senior partner in the Italian government) and 203,054 (write-in) personal preferences, the all-time record in Italian regional elections.

Veneto is home to Venetian nationalism (or Venetism), a political movement that appeared in the 1970s, demanding political and fiscal autonomy for the region (which is felt by Venetists to be a nation in its own right) and promoting Venetian culture, language and history. This was the background from which Liga Veneta emerged in 1980. In the 1990s and 2000s other Venetist parties (the Union of the Venetian People, the Veneto Autonomous Region Movement, Lega Autonomia Veneta, Liga Veneta Repubblica, North-East Project, etc.) emerged, but they never touched the popularity of Liga Veneta, which was a founding member of Lega Nord in 1991. Some Venetists have campaigned for federal reform and/or autonomy, others (notably including the Venetian National Party, the Party of the Venetians, Veneto State, Venetian Independence, Veneto First, Plebiscito.eu, Venetian Left, Independence We Veneto and We Are Veneto) for outright independence. Other than Liga Veneta, two Venetist political parties (Resist Veneto and Liga Veneta Repubblica, including Venetian Independence) are currently represented in the Regional Council of Veneto.

== Executive branch ==
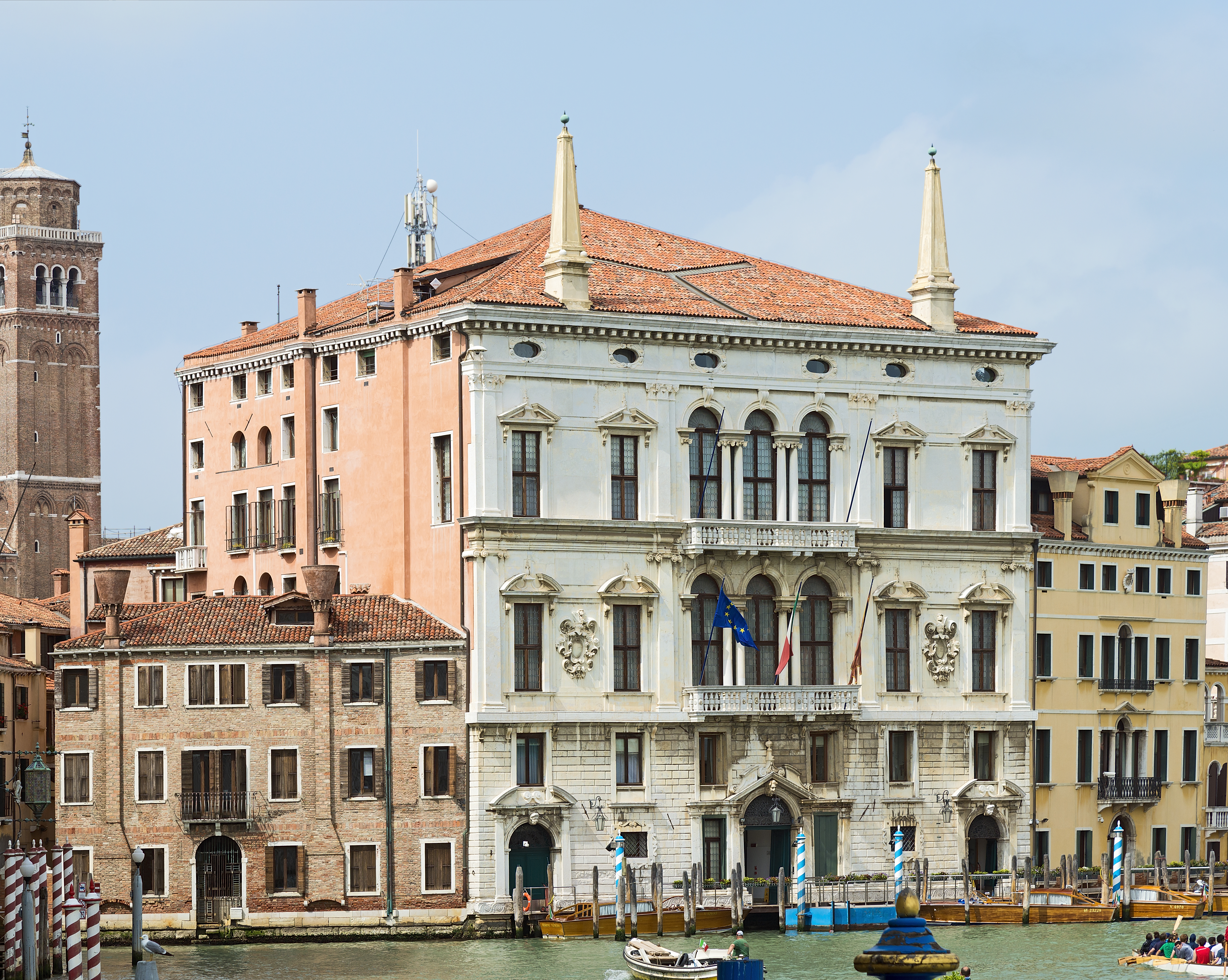
Palazzo Balbi in Venice is the seat of the Regional Government

The Regional Government (Giunta Regionale) is presided by the President of the Region (Presidente della Regione) or President of the Regional Government (Presidente della Giunta Regionale), who is elected for a five-year term, and is composed by the President and up to ten Assessors (Assessori), i.e. regional ministers, including a Vice President (Vice Presidente).

=== Current composition ===
Alberto Stefani was officially declared as President on 5 December 2025. The government composition was announced on 13 December 2025.

Party division

Party		Members
Liga Veneta–Lega	LV	President, 3 ministers and 2 councillors delegates
Brothers of Italy	FdI	Vice President and 4 ministers
Forza Italia	FI	1 minister
Independent	Ind	1 minister

Detailed composition

Name	Party	Office
Alberto Stefani	LV	President
Lucas Pavanetto	FdI	Vice President
Lucas Pavanetto	FdI	Minister of Tourism, Labour and Security
Filippo Giacinti	FdI	Minister of Budget, Patrimony, Legal Affairs, Personnel, Program Implementation and Digital Agenda
Gino Gerosa	Ind (Note: Appointed on behalf of Liga Veneta.)	Minister of Health and Healthcare Planning
Massimo Bitonci	LV	Minister of Economic Development, Research & Innovation and Investment Attraction
Marco Zecchinato	LV	Minister of Interregional Cooperation, Territorial Governance, Infrastructure, Local Government and Territorial Reorganisation
Dario Bond	FdI	Minister of Agriculture, Forests, Mountain, Hunting and Fishing
Valeria Mantovan	FdI	Minister of Education, Formation, Skills and Culture
Diego Ruzza	FdI	Minister of Transport, Mobility and Public Works
Elisa Venturini	FI	Minister of Environment, Climate and Civil Protection
Paola Roma	LV	Minister of Social Services, Family, Longevity, Sports and Housing

Notes:

Source: Veneto Region – Regional Government

=== List of presidents ===
President		Term of office		Party	Administration	Coalition	Legislature
President		Duration in years, months and days		Party	Administration	Coalition	Legislature
Presidents elected by the Regional Council (1970–1995)
1	Angelo Tomelleri (1924–1985)	1 August 1970	26 May 1972	DC	Tomelleri I	DC	I (1970)
1	Angelo Tomelleri (1924–1985)	1 year, 9 months and 26 days		DC	Tomelleri I	DC	I (1970)
2	Pietro Feltrin (1927–1982)	26 May 1972	13 March 1973	DC	Feltrin	DC	I (1970)
2	Pietro Feltrin (1927–1982)	9 months and 16 days		DC	Feltrin	DC	I (1970)
(1)	Angelo Tomelleri (1924–1985)	13 March 1973	3 August 1980	DC	Tomelleri II	DC	I (1970)
(1)	Angelo Tomelleri (1924–1985)	13 March 1973	3 August 1980	DC	Tomelleri III	DC • PRI	II (1975)
(1)	Angelo Tomelleri (1924–1985)	13 March 1973	3 August 1980	DC	Tomelleri IV	DC	II (1975)
(1)	Angelo Tomelleri (1924–1985)	7 years, 4 months and 22 days		DC	Tomelleri IV	DC	II (1975)
3	Carlo Bernini (1936–2011)	3 August 1980	9 August 1989	DC	Bernini I	DC • PSDI	III (1980)
3	Carlo Bernini (1936–2011)	3 August 1980	9 August 1989	DC	Bernini II	DC • PSI • PSDI • PLI	IV (1985)
3	Carlo Bernini (1936–2011)	9 years and 7 days		DC	Bernini II	DC • PSI • PSDI • PLI	IV (1985)
4	Gianfranco Cremonese (1940–2018)	9 August 1989	24 June 1992	DC	Cremonese I	DC • PSI • PSDI • PLI	IV (1985)
4	Gianfranco Cremonese (1940–2018)	9 August 1989	24 June 1992	DC	Cremonese II	DC • PSI • PSDI • PRI	V (1990)
4	Gianfranco Cremonese (1940–2018)	2 years, 10 months and 16 days		DC	Cremonese II	DC • PSI • PSDI • PRI	V (1990)
5	Franco Frigo (Born 1950)	10 November 1992	11 May 1993	DC	Frigo	DC • PSI • FdV	V (1990)
5	Franco Frigo (Born 1950)	6 months and 2 days		DC	Frigo	DC • PSI • FdV	V (1990)
6	Giuseppe Pupillo (Born 1940)	11 May 1993	26 May 1994	PDS	Pupillo	DC • PDS • PSI • FdV • UPV	V (1990)
6	Giuseppe Pupillo (Born 1940)	1 year and 16 days		PDS	Pupillo	DC • PDS • PSI • FdV • UPV	V (1990)
7	Aldo Bottin (Born 1938)	26 May 1994	26 May 1995	PPI	Bottin	PPI • LV • PLI • UPV	V (1990)
7	Aldo Bottin (Born 1938)	1 year and 1 day		PPI	Bottin	PPI • LV • PLI • UPV	V (1990)
Directly-elected presidents (since 1995)
8	Giancarlo Galan (Born 1956)	26 May 1995	10 April 2010	FI	Galan I	Pole for Freedoms (FI • AN • CDU • CCD)	VI (1995)
8	Giancarlo Galan (Born 1956)	26 May 1995	10 April 2010	FI	Galan II	House of Freedoms (FI • LV • AN • CDU • CCD)	VII (2000)
8	Giancarlo Galan (Born 1956)	26 May 1995	10 April 2010	FI	Galan III	House of Freedoms (FI • LV • AN • UDC)	VIII (2005)
8	Giancarlo Galan (Born 1956)	14 years, 10 months and 19 days		FI	Galan III	House of Freedoms (FI • LV • AN • UDC)	VIII (2005)
9	Luca Zaia (Born 1968)	10 April 2010	5 December 2025	LV	Zaia I	LV • PdL	IX (2010)
9	Luca Zaia (Born 1968)	10 April 2010	5 December 2025	LV	Zaia II	LV • FI	X (2015)
9	Luca Zaia (Born 1968)	10 April 2010	5 December 2025	LV	Zaia III	LV • FdI	XI (2020)
9	Luca Zaia (Born 1968)	15 years, 7 months and 23 days		LV	Zaia III	LV • FdI	XI (2020)
10	Alberto Stefani (Born 1992)	5 December 2025	Incumbent	LV	Stefani	LV • FdI • FI	XII (2025)
10	Alberto Stefani (Born 1992)	10 months and 6 days		LV	Stefani	LV • FdI • FI	XII (2025)

== Legislative branch ==
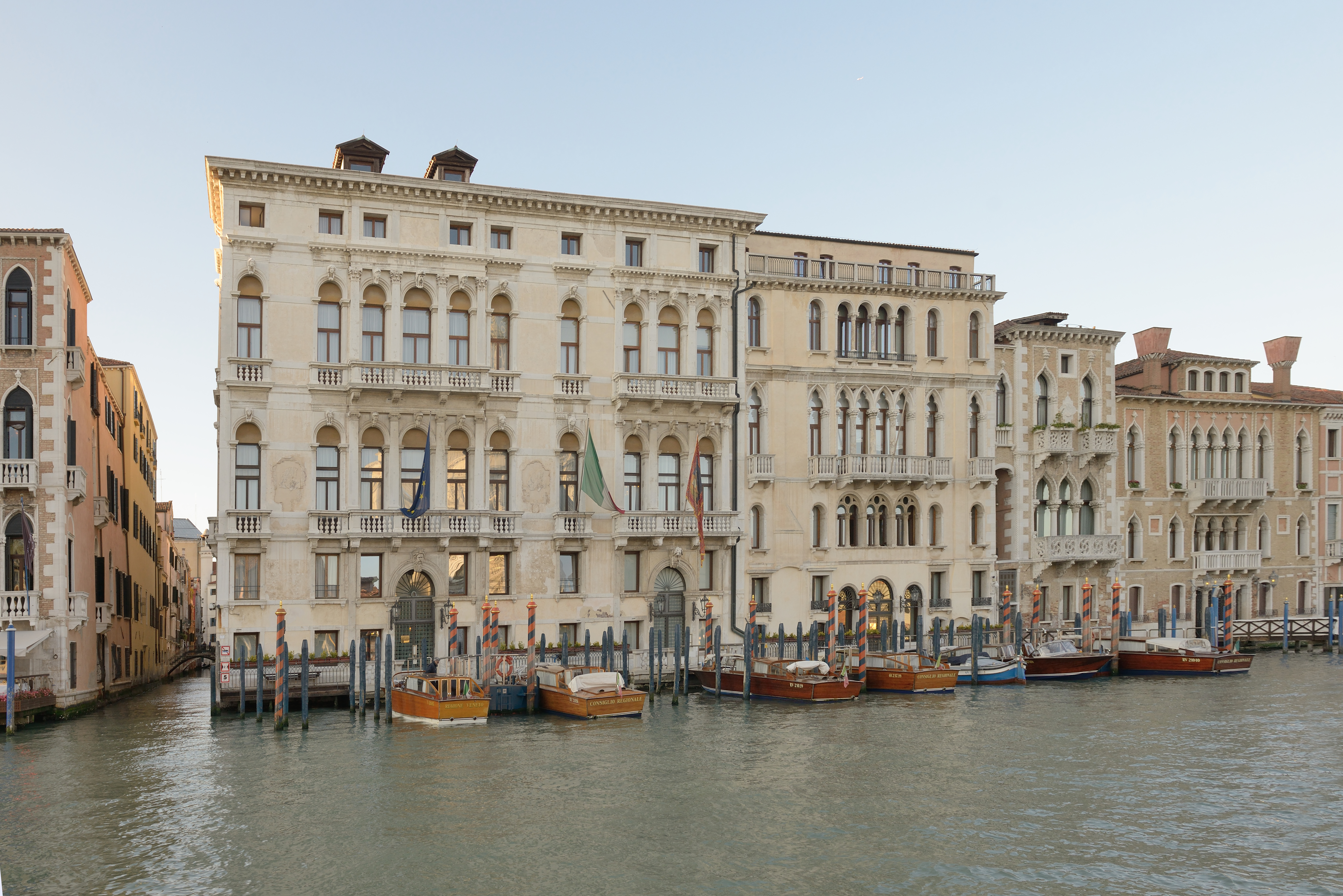
Palazzo Ferro Fini in Venice is the seat of the Regional Council

The Regional Council of Veneto (Consiglio Regionale del Veneto) is composed of 51 members. 49 councillors are elected in provincial constituencies by proportional representation using the largest remainder method with a Droop quota and open lists, while the remaining two are the elected President and the candidate for President who comes second. The winning coalition wins a bonus of seats in order to make sure the elected President has a majority in the Council.

The Council is elected for a five-year term, but, if the President suffers a vote of no confidence, resigns or dies, under the simul stabunt, simul cadent (literally: "they will stand together or they will fall together") clause introduced in 1999, also the Council is dissolved and a snap election is called.

=== Current composition ===
Distribution of Seats in the Regional Council
Political Group	Leader	Start	Now
Liga Veneta–Lega	Riccardo Barbisan	20	14
Democratic Party	Giovanni Manildo	10	10
Brothers of Italy	Claudio Borgia	9	9
Stefani for President (Note: Formed for technical reasons; all members are members of Liga Veneta.)	Matteo Pressi	0	4
Forza Italia	Alberto Bozza	3	3
Resist Veneto (Note: Regional councillor Davide Lovat, is an independent close to Venetian Independence.)	Riccardo Szumski	2	2
Greens and Left Alliance	Carlo Cunegato	2	2
Five Star Movement	Flavio Baldan	1	1
Venetian Reformists in Action (Note: The group's only member, Nicolò Rocco, is a member of Action.)	Nicolò Rocco	1	1
Liga Veneta Repubblica (Note: The group's only member, Alessio Morosin, is a member of Venetian Independence.)	Alessio Morosin	1	1
Union of the Centre	Eric Pasqualon	1	1
The Venetian Civic Lists	Rossella Cendron	1	1
Mixed Group	Sonia Brescacin (Note: Sonia Brescacin is a member of Liga Veneta. Stefano Valdegamberi is a member of National Future, having switched from Liga Veneta in April 2026.)	0	2

==== Political parties ====
Party	Seats	Status
Lega–Liga Veneta (Lega–LV)	19 / 51	Government
Democratic Party (PD)	10 / 51	Opposition
Brothers of Italy (FdI)	9 / 51	Government
Forza Italia (FI)	3 / 51	Government
Resist Veneto (RV)	2 / 51	Opposition
Greens and Left Alliance (AVS)	2 / 51	Opposition
Five Star Movement (M5S)	1 / 51	Opposition
Venetian Reformists in Action	1 / 51	Opposition
Liga Veneta Repubblica (LVR)	1 / 51	Government
Union of the Centre (UdC)	1 / 51	Government
The Venetian Civic Lists (CV)	1 / 51	Opposition
National Future (FN)	1 / 51	Government

==== Coalitions ====
Party	Seats	Status
Centre-right coalition	34 / 51	Government
Centre-left coalition	15 / 51	Opposition
Resist Veneto	2 / 51	Opposition

Sources: Regional Council of Veneto – Groups and Regional Council of Veneto – Members

== Local government ==
=== Provinces ===
Maps of Provinces of Veneto

Veneto is subdivided into seven provinces. They include Venice, which became a metropolitan city in 2015. In the latter case, the mayor of Venice functions authomatically also as metropolitan mayor, without any specific election.

All the seven provinces, but especially Vicenza, Verona and Padua, were long Christian Democratic heartlands. In the early 1990s, when the Venetian and Italian party systems experienced huge realignments, Treviso, Vicenza and Verona became strongholds of Liga Veneta–Lega Nord, while in Padua, the region's most populated, Forza Italia/The People of Freedom/Forza Italia was the dominant political force; only two provinces, Venice and Rovigo, have traditionally been the powerbases of the centre-left coalition and, more recently, the Democratic Party, while Belluno was long a swing province. In the 2020 regional election Liga Veneta, which fielded two lists, came largely first in each and every province.

After a reform was enacted in 2014, provinces have lost most powers to the region and the municipalities, and, contextually, provincial presidents have been elected by mayors and municipal councillors, whose votes are weighted according to the population of their municipalities. In some cases, elected presidents represent bipartisan or trans-party coalitions. For instance, in 2014 Enoch Soranzo was elected in Padua thanks to the decisive support of the Democratic Party, while the majority of the centre-right coalition had endorsed another candidate Achille Variati was endorsed both by the Democrats and Forza Italia in Vicenza. More recently, in 2022 Sergio Giordani was the unopposed joint candidate of all running parties in Padua and Andrea Nardin, who would later join the Brothers of Italy, was supported by a cross-bench coalition composed mainly by Liga Veneta and the Democratic Party, formed against the official candidate of the Brothers of Italy, in Vicenza. In 2026 Daniele Canella of Liga Veneta was elected with no opposition to succeed to Giordani in Padua, being supported by all parties, especially the Democratic Party, while he had originally lost his party's nomination.

In the following table, inhabitants are updated according to April 2024 ISTAT figures and, in case of non-party independent presidents supported by partisan coalitions, the party to which the mayor is closest or the largest party in the coalition is indicated in brackets. As of 2026, four provinces out of seven are led by presidents who are members of Liga Veneta.

Province	Inhabitants	President	Party	Election
Province of Padua	931,572	Daniele Canella	LV	2026
Province of Verona	927,862	Flavio Massimo Pasini	LV	2023
Province of Treviso	878,424	Marco Donadel	LV	2026
Province of Vicenza	854,683	Andrea Nardin	FdI	2023
Metropolitan City of Venice	834,632	Simone Venturini (metropolitan mayor)	Ind. (FdI)	2026
Province of Rovigo	227,535	Enrico Ferrarese	LV	2026
Province of Belluno	197,645	Marco Staunovo Polacco	LV	2026

Provincial seats

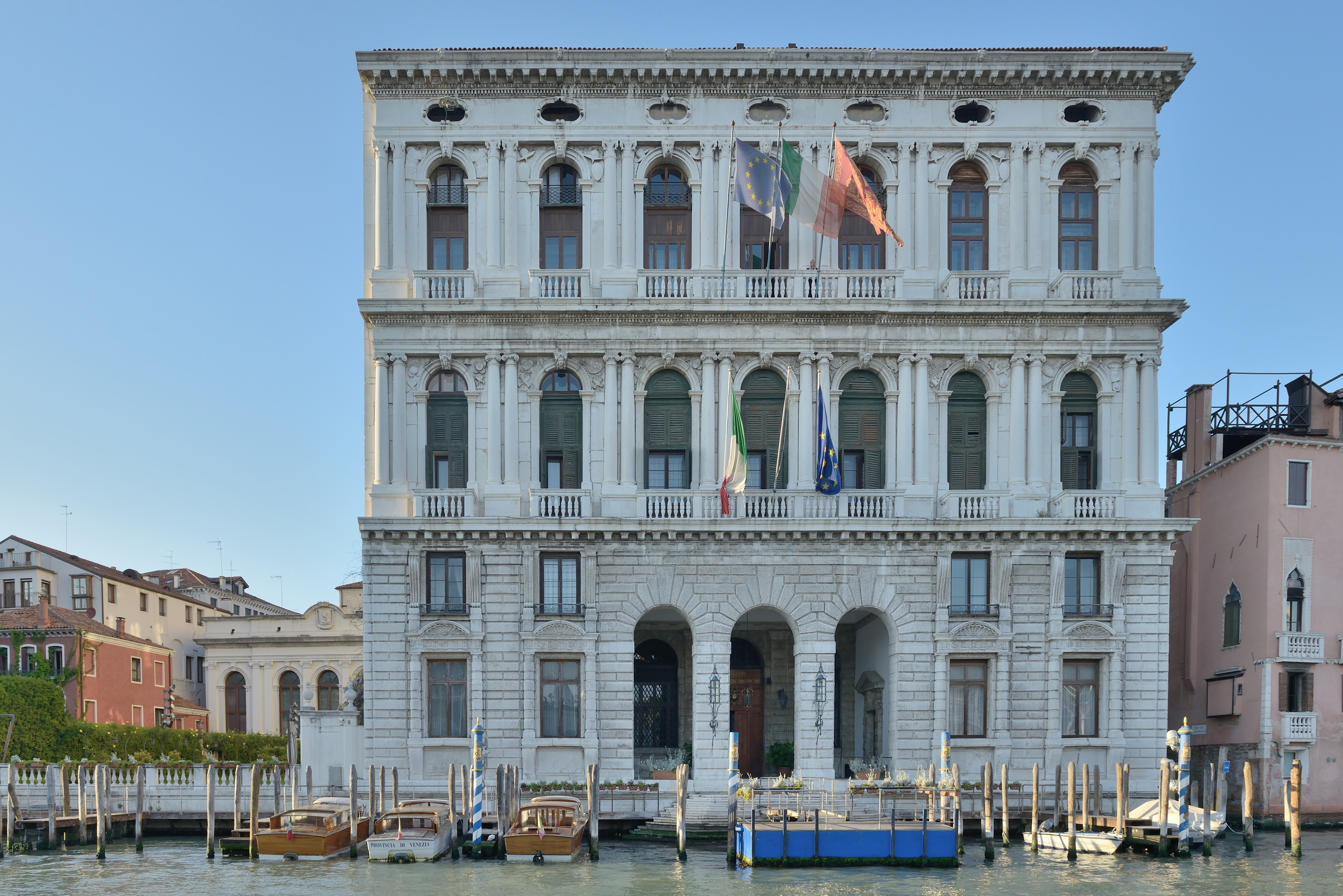
Venice

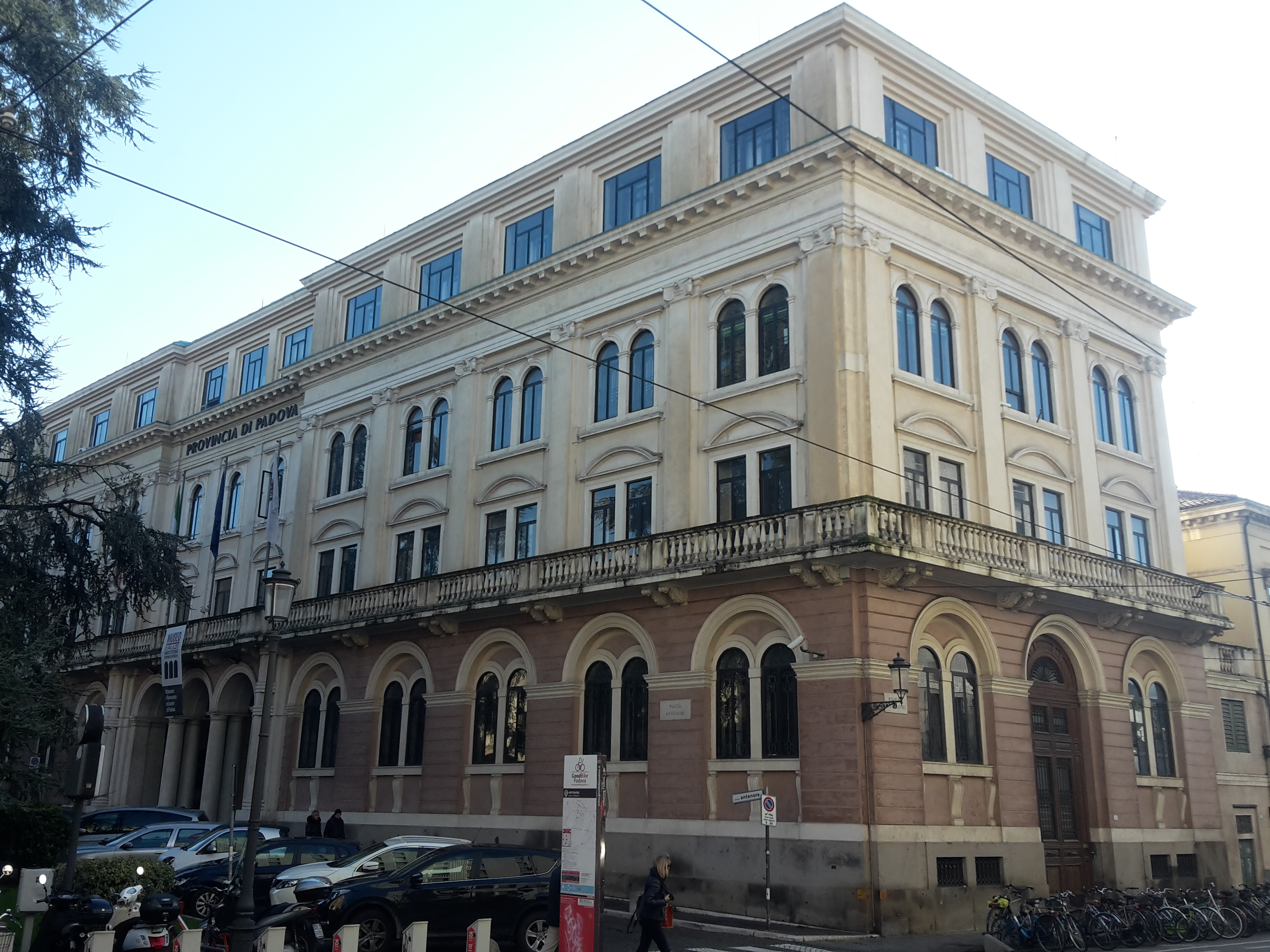
Padua

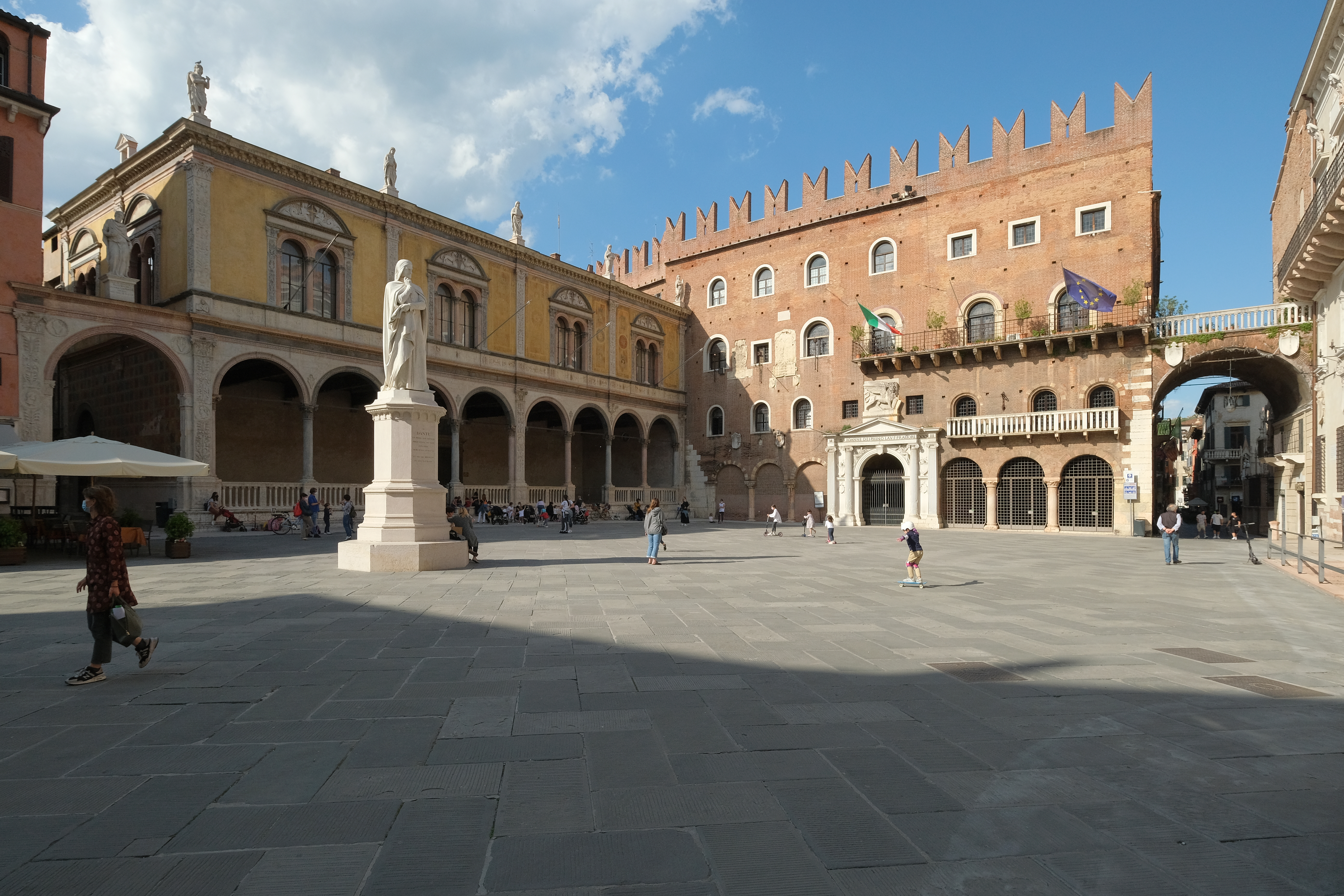
Verona

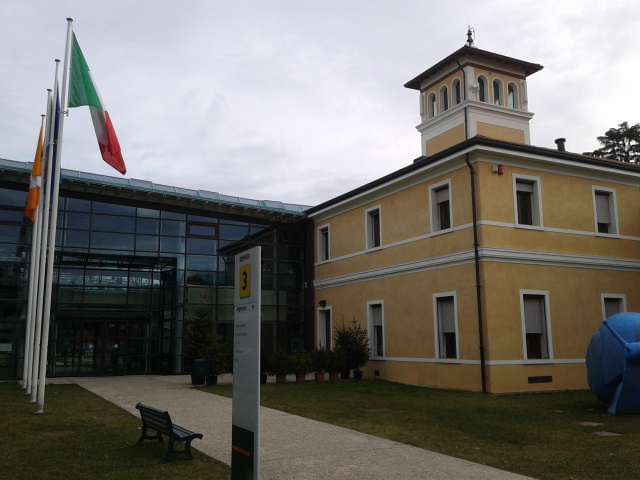
Treviso

=== Municipalities ===
Twenty-six comuni, hence municipalities, of Veneto have more than 25,000 inhabitants.

Of these, the Democratic Party and the Brothers of Italy have five mayors each, Liga Veneta four, Forza Italia two, Liga Veneta Repubblica and Us Moderates one each. Additionally, nine mayors are non-party independents: four jointly supported by Liga Veneta, the Brothers of Italy and Forza Italia, three by the Democratic Party and its centre-left allies, two by local non-partisan coalitions.

In the following table, inhabitants are updated according to April 2024 ISTAT figures and, in case of non-party independent mayors supported by partisan coalitions, the party to which the mayor is closest or the largest party in the coalition is indicated in brackets.

Municipality	Inhabitants	Mayor	Party	Election
Verona (list)	255,608	Damiano Tommasi	Ind. (PD)	2022
Venice (list)	250,185	Simone Venturini	Ind. (FdI)	2026
Padua (list)	207,242	Sergio Giordani	Ind. (PD)	2022
Vicenza (list)	110,807	Giacomo Possamai	PD	2023
Treviso (list)	84,457	Mario Conte	LV	2023
Rovigo (list)	50,103	Valeria Cittadin	Ind. (FdI)	2024
Chioggia	47,508	Mauro Armelao	LV	2021
Bassano del Grappa	42,436	Nicola Finco	LV	2024
San Donà di Piave	41,919	Alberto Teso	FdI	2023
Schio	38,877	Cristina Marigo	Ind.	2024
Mira	37,623	Marco Dori	PD	2022
Belluno (list)	35,467	Oscar De Pellegrin	Ind. (LV)	2022
Conegliano	34,419	Fabio Chies	FI	2021
Castelfranco Veneto	33,074	Maria Ghimenton	Ind. (PD)	2026
Villafranca di Verona	32,998	Roberto Dall'Oca	FI	2023
Montebelluna	31,214	Adalberto Bordin	LV	2021
Mogliano Veneto	27,942	Davide Bortolato	FdI	2024
Spinea	27,730	Franco Bevilacqua	PD	2024
Vittorio Veneto	27,279	Mirella Balliana	PD	2024
Albignasego	27,193	Valentina Luise	Ind. (FdI)	2026
Mirano	27,068	Tiziano Baggio	PD	2022
Jesolo	26,859	Christofer De Zotti	FdI	2022
Valdagno	25,763	Maurizio Zordan	Ind.	2024
Legnago	25,634	Paolo Longhi	FdI	2024
Arzignano	25,633	Riccardo Masiero	LVR	2026
San Giovanni Lupatoto	25,290	Attilio Gastaldello	NM	2021

== Political parties and elections ==
=== Latest regional election ===
The latest regional election took place on 23–24 November 2025.

Alberto Stefani of Liga Veneta–Lega (formerly Lega Nord) was elected President by a landslide 64.4% of the vote, with his main rival Giovanni Manildo and Riccardo Szumski obtaining 28.9% and 5.1%, respectively. Liga Veneta was confirmed the largest in the region with 36.3% of the vote, while the combined score of Venetian nationalist and/or regional parties was 45.0%. Brothers of Italy came second with 18.7% and the Democratic Party third with 16.6%. The outgoing and term-limited president, Luca Zaia, who had been elected for this third term in 2020 with a record-breaking 76.8% of the vote, headed the electoral slates of Liga Veneta in all seven provinces and obtained 203,054 (write-in) preferences, the all-time record in Italian regional elections.

23–24 November 2025 Venetian regional election results
Candidates	Votes	%	Seats	Parties	Votes	%	Seats
Alberto Stefani	1,211,356	64.39	1	League–Venetian League	607,220	36.28	19
Alberto Stefani	1,211,356	64.39	1	Brothers of Italy	312,839	18.69	9
Alberto Stefani	1,211,356	64.39	1	Forza Italia	105,375	6.30	3
Alberto Stefani	1,211,356	64.39	1	Liga Veneta Repubblica	30,703	1.83	1
Alberto Stefani	1,211,356	64.39	1	Union of the Centre	28,109	1.68	1
Alberto Stefani	1,211,356	64.39	1	Us Moderates	18,768	1.12	0
Alberto Stefani	1,211,356	64.39	1	Total	1,103,014	65.90	33
Giovanni Manildo	543,278	28.88	1	Democratic Party	277,945	16.60	9
Giovanni Manildo	543,278	28.88	1	Greens and Left Alliance	77,621	4.64	2
Giovanni Manildo	543,278	28.88	1	Five Star Movement	36,866	2.20	1
Giovanni Manildo	543,278	28.88	1	United for Manildo for President	35,669	2.13	1
Giovanni Manildo	543,278	28.88	1	The Venetian Civic Lists	24,926	1.49	1
Giovanni Manildo	543,278	28.88	1	Peace Health Work	10,430	0.62	0
Giovanni Manildo	543,278	28.88	1	Volt	5,339	0.32	0
Giovanni Manildo	543,278	28.88	1	Total	468,796	28.01	14
Riccardo Szumski	96,474	5.13	0	Resist Veneto	83,054	4.96	2
Marco Rizzo	20,574	1.09	0	Sovereign Popular Democracy	12,941	0.77	0
Fabio Bui	9,590	0.51	0	Populars for Veneto	6,071	0.36	0
Blank and invalid votes	36,305	1.89					
Total candidates	1,881,272	100.0	2	Total parties	1,673,876	100.0	49
Registered voters/turnout	1,917,577	44.65					
Source: Veneto Region – Results

=== Latest general election ===
The centre-right coalition (56.3%), this time dominated by the Brothers of Italy, obtained a far larger victory than four years before over the centre-left coalition (23.0%), Action – Italia Viva (8.4%) and the Five Star Movement (5.8%). One third of deputies and senators were elected in single-seat constituencies and, as in 2018, the centre-right won all such constituencies. Among parties, the Brothers of Italy came largely first with 32.7% of the vote, followed by the Democratic Party (16.3%) and Lega (14.5%). The biggest turnaround happened within the centre-right, as Lega lost more than half of the votes obtained in 2018 (–17.7pp) and the Brothers of Italy jumped from 4.2% to virtually eight times that share (+28.5pp).

Chamber of Deputies

Coalition	Party	Proportional			First-past-the-post			Total seats
Coalition	Party	Votes	%	Seats	Votes	%	Seats	Total seats
Centre-right coalition	Brothers of Italy	821,583	32.7	7	1,413,108	56.3	5	12
Centre-right coalition	Lega (incl. Liga Veneta)	365,190	14.5	3	1,413,108	56.3	6	9
Centre-right coalition	Forza Italia	175,057	7.0	2	1,413,108	56.3	–	2
Centre-right coalition	Us Moderates	51,278	2.0	–	1,413,108	56.3	1	1
Centre-right coalition				12			12	24
Centre-left coalition	Democratic Party	409,001	16.3	4	578,406	23.0	–	4
Centre-left coalition	Greens and Left Alliance	83,426	3.3	1	578,406	23.0	–	1
Centre-left coalition	More Europe	77,238	3.1	–	578,406	23.0	–	–
Centre-left coalition	Civic Commitment	8,741	0.3	–	578,406	23.0	–	–
Centre-left coalition				5			–	5
Action – Italia Viva		210,720	8.4	2	210,720	8.4	–	2
Five Star Movement		146,319	5.8	1	146,319	5.8	–	1
Italexit		62,557	2.5	–	62,557	2.5	–	–
Vita		44,430	1.8	–	44,430	1.8	–	–
Sovereign and Popular Italy		27,853	1.1	–	27,853	1.1	–	–
People's Union		24,724	1.0	–	24,724	1.0	–	–
Alternative for Italy		3,674	0.1	–	3,674	0.1	–	–
Total		2,511,881	100.0	20	2,511,881	100.0	12	32

Sources: Regional Council of Veneto, Ministry of the Interior, Ministry of the Interior and Corriere della Sera

Senate

Coalition	Party	Proportional			First-past-the-post			Total seats
Coalition	Party	Votes	%	Seats	Votes	%	Seats	Total seats
Centre-right coalition	Brothers of Italy	817,771	32.6	3	1,410,353	56.2	2	5
Centre-right coalition	Lega (incl. Liga Veneta)	366,266	14.6	2	1,410,353	56.2	2	4
Centre-right coalition	Forza Italia	174,377	7.0	1	1,410,353	56.2	1	2
Centre-right coalition	Us Moderates	51,939	2.1	–	1,410,353	56.2	–	–
Centre-right coalition				6			5	11
Centre-left coalition	Democratic Party	404,957	16.1	2	582,005	23.2	–	2
Centre-left coalition	Greens and Left Alliance	87,476	3.5	1	582,005	23.2	–	1
Centre-left coalition	More Europe	81,708	3.3	–	582,005	23.2	–	–
Centre-left coalition	Civic Commitment	7,864	0.3	–	582,005	23.2	–	–
Centre-left coalition				3			–	3
Action – Italia Viva		210,033	8.4	1	210,033	8.4	–	1
Five Star Movement		145,545	5.8	1	145,545	5.8	–	1
Italexit		61,777	2.5	–	61,777	2.5	–	–
Vita		42,537	1.7	–	42,537	1.7	–	–
Sovereign and Popular Italy		26,627	1.1	–	26,627	1.1	–	–
People's Union		23,303	0.9	–	23,303	0.9	–	–
Alternative for Italy		8,604	0.3	–	8,604	0.3	–	–
Total		2,510,784	100.0	11	2,510,784	100.0	5	16

Sources: Regional Council of Veneto, Ministry of the Interior and Corriere della Sera

=== Latest EP election ===
Party	Votes	%
Brothers of Italy	774,624	37.6
Democratic Party	389,053	18.9
Lega	271,142	13.2
Forza Italia–Us Moderates	176,891	8.6
Greens and Left Alliance	125,487	6.1
Five Star Movement	99,866	4.8
Action	84,580	4.1
United States of Europe	65,992	3.2
Peace Land Dignity	41,868	2.0
Freedom	17,635	0.9
South Tyrolean People's Party	7,418	0.4
Popular Alternative	6,632	0.3
Total	2,061,188	100.00

Source: Ministry of the Interior

== Sources ==
- Veneto Region – Legislatures
- Regional Council of Veneto – Elections
- Cattaneo Institute – Archive of Election Data
- Ministry of the Interior – Historical Archive of Elections
