= Members of the Regional Council of Veneto, 2025–2030 =

The XII Legislature of the Regional Council of Veneto, the legislative assembly of Veneto, was inaugurated in December 2025, following the 2025 regional election. Of the 51 members, 49 were elected in provincial constituencies by proportional representation using the largest remainder method with a Droop quota and open lists, while the remaining two were the elected President and the runner-up.

Luca Zaia (Liga Veneta–Lega), who was President of Veneto from 2010 to 2025, has served as President of the Council since 15 December 2025, while Alberto Stefani (Liga Veneta) is his successor as President of Veneto at the head of a coalition government formed by Liga Veneta, the Brothers of Italy and Forza Italia, supported also by Liga Veneta Repubblica and the Union of the Centre.

== Composition ==
=== Strength of political groups ===
Distribution of Seats in the Regional Council
Political Group	Leader	Start	Now
Liga Veneta–Lega	Riccardo Barbisan	20	14
Democratic Party	Giovanni Manildo	10	10
Brothers of Italy	Claudio Borgia	9	9
Stefani for President (Note: Formed for technical reasons; all members are members of Liga Veneta.)	Matteo Pressi	0	4
Forza Italia	Alberto Bozza	3	3
Resist Veneto (Note: Regional councillor Davide Lovat, is an independent close to Venetian Independence.)	Riccardo Szumski	2	2
Greens and Left Alliance	Carlo Cunegato	2	2
Five Star Movement	Flavio Baldan	1	1
Venetian Reformists in Action (Note: The group's only member, Nicolò Rocco, is a member of Action.)	Nicolò Rocco	1	1
Liga Veneta Repubblica (Note: The group's only member, Alessio Morosin, is a member of Venetian Independence.)	Alessio Morosin	1	1
Union of the Centre	Eric Pasqualon	1	1
The Venetian Civic Lists	Rossella Cendron	1	1
Mixed Group	Sonia Brescacin (Note: Sonia Brescacin is a member of Liga Veneta. Stefano Valdegamberi is a member of National Future, having switched from Liga Veneta in April 2026.)	0	2

==== Political parties ====
Party	Start	Now	Status
Liga Veneta–Lega (LV–Lega)	20 / 51	19 / 51	Government
Democratic Party (PD)	10 / 51	10 / 51	Opposition
Brothers of Italy (FdI)	9 / 51	9 / 51	Government
Forza Italia (FI)	3 / 51	3 / 51	Government
Resist Veneto (RV)	2 / 51	2 / 51	Opposition
Greens and Left Alliance (AVS)	2 / 51	2 / 51	Opposition
Five Star Movement (M5S)	1 / 51	1 / 51	Opposition
Action	1 / 51	1 / 51	Opposition
Liga Veneta Repubblica (LVR)	1 / 51	1 / 51	Government
Union of the Centre (UdC)	1 / 51	1 / 51	Government
The Venetian Civic Lists (CV)	1 / 51	1 / 51	Opposition
National Future (FN)	1 / 51	1 / 51	Government

==== Coalitions ====
Party	Seats	Status
Centre-right coalition	34 / 51	Government
Centre-left coalition	15 / 51	Opposition
Resist Veneto	2 / 51	Opposition

Sources: Regional Council of Veneto – Groups and Regional Council of Veneto – Members

=== Members by party of election ===
==== Liga Veneta–Lega ====
- Riccardo Barbisan
- Giorgia Bedin
- Alessia Bevilacqua
- Sonia Brescacin (switched to the "Mixed Group" in December 2025)
- Francesco Calzavara
- Rosanna Conte
- Cristiano Corazzari
- Elisa De Berti
- Manuela Lanzarin
- Roberto Marcato
- Stefano Marcon (substitute of Paola Roma, installed on 18 December 2025)
- Morena Martini (substitute of Marco Zecchinato, installed on 18 December 2025); switched to "Stefani for President" in December 2025
- Eleonora Mosco (switched to "Stefani for President" in December 2025)
- Matteo Pressi (switched to "Stefani for President" in December 2025)
- Filippo Rigo
- Paola Roma (appointed regional minister on 16 December 2025, substituted by Stefano Marcon)
- Alberto Stefani
- Andrea Tomaello (switched to "Stefani for President" in December 2025)
- Stefano Valdegamberi (switched to the "Mixed Group" in April 2026)
- Roberta Vianello
- Luca Zaia
- Marco Zecchinato (appointed regional minister on 16 December 2025, substituted by Morena Martini)

==== Democratic Party ====
- Anna-Maria Bigon
- Antonio Marco Dalla Pozza
- Alessandro Del Bianco
- Paolo Galeano
- Chiara Luisetto
- Giovanni Manildo
- Andrea Micalizzi
- Jonatan Montanariello
- Monica Sambo
- Gianpaolo Trevisi

==== Brothers of Italy ====
- Matteo Baldan (substitute of Lucas Pavanetto, installed on 18 December 2025)
- Claudia Barbera (substitute of Diego Ruzza, installed on 18 December 2025)
- Fabio Benetti (substitute of Valeria Mantovan, installed on 18 December 2025)
- Laura Besio
- Dario Bond (appointed regional minister on 16 December 2025, substituted by Silvia Calligaro)
- Claudio Borgia
- Silvia Calligaro (substitute of Dario Bond, installed on 18 December 2025)
- Filippo Giacinti (appointed regional minister on 16 December 2025, substituted by Enoch Soranzo)
- Anna Leso
- Valeria Mantovan (appointed regional minister on 16 December 2025, substituted by Fabio Benetti)
- Lucas Pavanetto (appointed regional minister on 16 December 2025, substituted by Matteo Baldan)
- Francesco Rucco
- Diego Ruzza (appointed regional minister on 16 December 2025, substituted by Claudia Barbera)
- Enoch Soranzo (substitute of Filippo Giacinti, installed on 18 December 2025)

==== Forza Italia ====
- Alberto Bozza (installed on 15 December 2025)
- Jacopo Maltauro
- Mirko Patron (substitute of Elisa Venturini, installed on 18 December 2025)
- Flavio Tosi (resigned on 13 December 2025)
- Elisa Venturini (appointed regional minister on 16 December 2025, substituted by Mirko Patron)

==== Resist Veneto ====
- Davide Lovat
- Riccardo Szumski

==== Greens and Left Alliance ====
- Carlo Cunegato
- Elena Ostanel

==== Five Star Movement ====
- Flavio Baldan

==== United for Manildo for President ====
(In January 2025 "Venetian Reformists in Action", reference to Action, was added to the group's name. Consequently, the group's full name became "Venetian Reformists in Action – United for Manildo for President")

- Nicolò Rocco

==== Liga Veneta Repubblica ====
- Alessio Morosin

==== Union of the Centre ====
- Eric Pasqualon

==== The Venetian Civic Lists ====
- Rossella Cendron

== Election ==
Alberto Stefani of Liga Veneta–Lega (formerly Lega Nord) was elected President by a landslide 64.4% of the vote, with his main rival Giovanni Manildo and Riccardo Szumski obtaining 28.9% and 5.1%, respectively. Liga Veneta was confirmed the largest in the region with 36.3% of the vote, while the combined score of Venetian nationalist and/or regional parties was 45.0%. Brothers of Italy came second with 18.7% and the Democratic Party third with 16.6%. The outgoing and term-limited president, Luca Zaia, who had been elected for this third term in 2020 with a record-breaking 76.8% of the vote, headed the electoral slates of Liga Veneta in all seven provinces and obtained 203,054 (write-in) preferences, the all-time record in Italian regional elections.

23–24 November 2025 Venetian regional election results
Candidates	Votes	%	Seats	Parties	Votes	%	Seats
Alberto Stefani	1,211,356	64.39	1	Liga Veneta–Lega	607,220	36.28	19
Alberto Stefani	1,211,356	64.39	1	Brothers of Italy	312,839	18.69	9
Alberto Stefani	1,211,356	64.39	1	Forza Italia	105,375	6.30	3
Alberto Stefani	1,211,356	64.39	1	Liga Veneta Repubblica	30,703	1.83	1
Alberto Stefani	1,211,356	64.39	1	Union of the Centre	28,109	1.68	1
Alberto Stefani	1,211,356	64.39	1	Us Moderates	18,768	1.12	0
Alberto Stefani	1,211,356	64.39	1	Total	1,103,014	65.90	33
Giovanni Manildo	543,278	28.88	1	Democratic Party	277,945	16.60	9
Giovanni Manildo	543,278	28.88	1	Greens and Left Alliance	77,621	4.64	2
Giovanni Manildo	543,278	28.88	1	Five Star Movement	36,866	2.20	1
Giovanni Manildo	543,278	28.88	1	United for Manildo for President	35,669	2.13	1
Giovanni Manildo	543,278	28.88	1	The Venetian Civic Lists	24,926	1.49	1
Giovanni Manildo	543,278	28.88	1	Peace Health Work	10,430	0.62	0
Giovanni Manildo	543,278	28.88	1	Volt	5,339	0.32	0
Giovanni Manildo	543,278	28.88	1	Total	468,796	28.01	14
Riccardo Szumski	96,474	5.13	0	Resist Veneto	83,054	4.96	2
Marco Rizzo	20,574	1.09	0	Sovereign Popular Democracy	12,941	0.77	0
Fabio Bui	9,590	0.51	0	Populars for Veneto	6,071	0.36	0
Blank and invalid votes	36,305	1.89					
Total candidates	1,881,272	100.0	2	Total parties	1,673,876	100.0	49
Registered voters/turnout	1,917,577	44.65					
Source: Veneto Region – Results
