= Stefani government =

The Stefani government, led by president Alberto Stefani, has been the government of Veneto since 16 December 2025, after being announced three days earlier.

Party division

Party		Members
Liga Veneta–Lega	LV	President, 3 ministers and 2 councillors delegates
Brothers of Italy	FdI	Vice President and 4 ministers
Forza Italia	FI	1 minister
Independent	Ind	1 minister

Detailed composition

Name	Party	Office
Alberto Stefani	LV	President
Lucas Pavanetto	FdI	Vice President
Lucas Pavanetto	FdI	Minister of Tourism, Labour and Security
Filippo Giacinti	FdI	Minister of Budget, Patrimony, Legal Affairs, Personnel, Program Implementation and Digital Agenda
Gino Gerosa	Ind (Note: Appointed on behalf of Liga Veneta.)	Minister of Health and Healthcare Planning
Massimo Bitonci	LV	Minister of Economic Development, Research & Innovation and Investment Attraction
Marco Zecchinato	LV	Minister of Interregional Cooperation, Territorial Governance, Infrastructure, Local Government and Territorial Reorganisation
Dario Bond	FdI	Minister of Agriculture, Forests, Mountain, Hunting and Fishing
Valeria Mantovan	FdI	Minister of Education, Formation, Skills and Culture
Diego Ruzza	FdI	Minister of Transport, Mobility and Public Works
Elisa Venturini	FI	Minister of Environment, Climate and Civil Protection
Paola Roma	LV	Minister of Social Services, Family, Longevity, Sports and Housing

Notes:

Source: Veneto Region – Regional Government

Additionally, President Stefani appointed three regional councillors to be councillors delegates to some government areas: (Note: According to article 51.5 of the Statute of Veneto, "The President of the Regional Government may delegate specific tasks to regional councillors based on their specific and proven expertise. The councillor delegate participates in Regional Government meetings without the right to vote, when matters pertaining to the delegated tasks are discussed. The exercise of this delegation does not give rise to any compensation".)

Name	Party	Office
Elisa De Berti	LV	Councillor delegate to Infrastructure and Program Implementation
Morena Martini	LV	Councillor delegate to Youth Participation and Relations with the Regional Council
Laura Besio	FdI	Councillor delegate to the special status of Venice and the development of the industrial area of Porto Marghera (since January 2026)
Eric Pasqualon	UdC	Councillor delegate to the Venexus project and generational housing (since April 2026)
