= Members of the Regional Council of Veneto, 2020–2025 =

The XI Legislature of the Regional Council of Veneto, the legislative assembly of Veneto, was inaugurated in October 2020, following the 2020 regional election. Of the 51 members, 49 were elected in provincial constituencies by proportional representation using the largest remainder method with a Droop quota and open lists, while the remaining two were the elected President and the runner-up.

Roberto Ciambetti (Liga Veneta–Lega) is the current President of the Council (having served in that role also in 2015–2020), while Luca Zaia (Liga Veneta) serves as President of Veneto at the head of his third government.

== Composition ==
=== Strength of political groups ===
Distribution of Seats in the Regional Council
Political Group	Leader	2020	2025
Zaia for President / Zaia List (Note: This group and "Liga Veneta" are united in a joint group named "Lega – Liga Veneta". See https://www.vipiu.it/leggi/villanova-e-pan-lega-lv-intergruppo-lega-liga-veneta-non-piu-due-gruppi-separati-ma-ununica-squadra-di-militanti-leghisti-con-obiettivi-comuni.) (Note: All the group members, but Gabriele Michieletto, are affiliated to Liga Veneta–Lega.)	Alberto Villanova	23	16
Liga Veneta	Giuseppe Pan	10	12
Brothers of Italy	Raffaele Speranzon / Daniele Polato / Enoch Soranzo / Daniele Polato / Enoch Soranzo / Lucas Pavanetto	5	7
Venetian Democratic Party	Giacomo Possamai / Vanessa Camani	6	5
Forza Italia (Note: A third regional councillor, Fabrizio Boron, originally a member of Liga Veneta, who joined the party in December 2023, sits in the Mixed Group for technical reasons.)	Elisa Venturini	2	2
Green Europe / Greens and Left Alliance	Cristina Guarda / Renzo Masolo	1	2
Five Star Movement	Erika Baldin	1	1
Venetian Autonomy (Note: The group's only member, Tomas Piccinini, was briefly a member of Liga Veneta.)	Tomas Piccinini	1	1
Veneto We Want	Elena Ostanel	1	1
Mixed Group (Note: Current members: Fabiano Barbisan and Stefano Valdegamberi, both originally members of Liga Veneta, who switched to the group for technical reasons soon after the election and have been in and out from the party for different reasons at different times, Arturo Lorenzoni, the centre-left candidate for President, who is close to both the Democratic Party and Veneto We Want (Art.1, SI, etc.), and Fabrizio Boron, a former member of Liga Veneta, who joined Forza Italia in December 2023, without changing group affiliation thereafter.)	Stefano Valdegamberi	1	4

Sources: Regional Council of Veneto – Groups and Regional Council of Veneto – Members

=== Members by party of election ===
==== Zaia for President ====
(In September 2025 the group was renamed "Zaia List".)

- Fabiano Barbisan (switched to the "Mixed Group" in October 2020)
- Roberto Bet
- Simona Bisaglia
- Gianpaolo Bottacin (switched to "Liga Veneta" in October 2020, appointed regional minister on 16 October 2020, replaced by substitute Giovanni Puppato)
- Fabrizio Boron (switched to the "Mixed Group" in November 2023, member of Forza Italia since December 2023)
- Sonia Brescacin
- Francesco Calzavara (appointed regional minister on 16 October 2020, substituted by Roberta Vianello)
- Elisa Cavinato
- Giulio Centenaro
- Silvia Cestaro
- Roberto Ciambetti (switched to "Liga Veneta" in October 2020)
- Nazzareno Gerolimetto
- Stefano Giacomin
- Silvia Maino
- Gabriele Michieletto
- Filippo Rigo (switched to "Liga Veneta" in October 2020)
- Silvia Rizzotto (switched to "Brothers of Italy" in April 2025)
- Luciano Sandonà
- Francesca Scatto
- Alessandra Sponda
- Stefano Valdegamberi (switched to the "Mixed Group" in October 2020)
- Roberta Vianello (substitute of Francesco Calzavara, installed on 21 October 2020)
- Alberto Villanova
- Marco Zecchinato

==== Liga Veneta ====
(Full name: "Liga Veneta for Salvini Premier".)

- Marco Andreoli (substitute of Elisa De Berti, installed on 21 October 2020; switched to "Brothers of Italy" in April 2025)
- Federico Caner (appointed regional minister on 16 October 2020, substituted by Giacomo Possamai)
- Andrea Cecchellero (installed on 16 July 2024)
- Milena Cecchetto (substitute of Manuela Lanzarin, installed on 21 October 2020)
- Laura Cestari (substitute of Cristiano Corazzari, installed on 21 October 2020)
- Cristiano Corazzari (appointed regional minister on 16 October 2020, substituted by Laura Cestari)
- Enrico Corsi
- Elisa De Berti (appointed regional minister on 16 October 2020, substituted by Marco Andreoli)
- Marco Dolfin
- Marzio Favero
- Nicola Finco (resigned on 9 July 2024)
- Manuela Lanzarin (appointed regional minister on 16 October 2020, substituted by Milena Cecchetto)
- Giacomo Possamai (substitute of Federico Caner, installed on 21 October 2020)
- Giovanni Puppato (substitute of Gianpaolo Bottacin, installed on 21 October 2020)
- Roberto Marcato (appointed regional minister on 16 October 2020, substituted by Giuseppe Pan)
- Giuseppe Pan (substitute of Roberto Marcato, installed on 21 October 2020)
- Luca Zaia (elected as president)

==== Venetian Democratic Party ====
- Anna Maria Bigon
- Vanessa Camani
- Arturo Lorenzoni (elected as runner-up for president; joined the Mixed Group at the start of the term)
- Chiara Luisetto (installed on 20 June 2023)
- Jonatan Montanariello
- Giacomo Possamai (resigned on 20 June 2023)
- Andrea Zanoni (switched to "Green Europe" in January 2025)
- Francesca Zottis

==== Brothers of Italy ====
(Full name: "Brothers of Italy – Giorgia Meloni".)

- Stefano Casali (installed on 31 July 2024)
- Elena Donazzan (appointed regional minister on 16 October 2020, substituted by Joe Formaggio; resigned on 20 July 2024)
- Joe Formaggio (substitute of Elena Donazzan, installed on 21 October 2020; permanent replacement since 20 July 2024)
- Lucas Pavanetto (installed on 14 October 2022)
- Daniele Polato (resigned on 31 July 2024)
- Tommaso Razzolini
- Raffaele Speranzon (resigned on 14 October 2022)
- Enoch Soranzo

==== Forza Italia ====
(Full name: "Forza Italia – Berlusconi President – Autonomy for Veneto".)

- Alberto Bozza
- Elisa Venturini

==== Five Star Movement ====
- Erika Baldin

==== Venetian Autonomy ====
- Tomas Piccinini

==== Veneto We Want ====
- Elena Ostanel

==== Green Europe ====
(In September 2025 the group was renamed "Greens and Left Alliance".)

- Cristina Guarda (resigned on 9 July 2024)
- Renzo Masolo (installed on 16 July 2024)

== Election ==
Luca Zaia of Liga Veneta–Lega was re-elected President by a record 76.8% of the vote. Liga Veneta, which ran an official party list, a list named after Zaia and a third list in combination with Liga Veneta Repubblica, was confirmed the largest in the region with 63.9%. The Democratic Party came second with 11.9% and the Brothers of Italy third with 9.6%. The total score of Venetist parties was 65.5%, the highest ever.

20–21 September 2020 Venetian regional election results
Candidates	Votes	%	Seats	Parties	Votes	%	Seat
Luca Zaia	1,883,959	76.79	1	Zaia for President	916,087	44.57	23
Luca Zaia	1,883,959	76.79	1	League – Venetian League	347,832	16.92	9
Luca Zaia	1,883,959	76.79	1	Brothers of Italy	196,310	9.55	5
Luca Zaia	1,883,959	76.79	1	Forza Italia	73,244	3.56	2
Luca Zaia	1,883,959	76.79	1	Venetian Autonomy List	48,932	2.38	1
Luca Zaia	1,883,959	76.79	1	Total	1,582,405	77.00	40
Arturo Lorenzoni	385,768	15.72	1	Democratic Party	244,881	11.92	6
Arturo Lorenzoni	385,768	15.72	1	Veneto We Want	41,275	2.01	1
Arturo Lorenzoni	385,768	15.72	1	Green Europe	34,647	1.69	1
Arturo Lorenzoni	385,768	15.72	1	More Veneto in Europe – Volt	14,246	0.69	–
Arturo Lorenzoni	385,768	15.72	1	Venetian Left	2,405	0.12	–
Arturo Lorenzoni	385,768	15.72	1	Total	337,454	16.42	8
Enrico Cappelletti	79,662	3.25	–	Five Star Movement	55,281	2.69	1
Paolo Girotto	21,679	0.88	–	3V Movement	14,916	0.73	–
Antonio Guadagnini	20,502	0.84	–	Party of Venetians	19,756	0.96	–
Paolo Benvegnù	18,529	0.76	–	Solidarity Environment Work	11,846	0.58	–
Daniela Sbrollini	15,198	0.62	–	Italia Viva – PSI – PRI	12,426	0.60	–
Patrizia Bertelle	14,518	0.59	–	Veneto Ecology Solidarity	9,061	0.44	–
Simonetta Rubinato	13,703	0.56	–	Veneto for the Autonomies	12,028	0.59	–
Total candidates	2,453,518	100.00	2	Total parties	2,055,173	100.00	49
Source: Ministry of the Interior – Electoral Archive
