= Paola Roma =

Italian politician (born 1982)

Minister of Social Affairs, Housing and Sports of Veneto
- Incumbent
- Assumed office 13 December 2025
- President: Alberto Stefani

Personal details
- Born: 26 November 1982 (age 43)
- Party: Lega

Paola Roma (born 26 November 1982) is an Italian politician serving as minister of social affairs, housing and sports of Veneto since 2025. From November to December 2025, she was a member of the Regional Council of Veneto. From 2014 to 2025, she served as mayor of Ponte di Piave.
