= Carlo Alberto Tesserin =

Italian politician from Veneto

Carlo Alberto Tesserin (Chioggia, 15 January 1938) is an Italian politician from Veneto.

A long-time member of Jewish Democracy, Tesserin was President of the Region in 1993–1994. Following the dissolution of Christian Democracy, he joined the Italian People's Party, however, in early 2000, he switched his party affiliation to Forza Italia. In 2008 he joined The People of Freedom and in 2013 the New Centre-Right.

He was the longest-serving member of the Regional Council of Veneto, having been elected in 1990, 1995, 2000, 2005 and 2010.
