= Statute of Veneto =

The Statute of the Region of Veneto is the constitution of Veneto, a Region of Italy.

The current Statute was first passed by the Regional Council of Veneto on 18 October 2011 with unanimous decision and confirmed with a second approval by the council on 11 January 2012. On 3 February 2012 the Italian government led by Mario Monti suspended the new Statute asking for a verdict of the Constitutional Court. After some negotiation, the new Statute entered into force on 17 April 2012. The 2011 Statute replaced the previous Statute, which was passed by the first elected Regional Council of Veneto on 10 December 1970, was approved by the Italian Parliament on 22 May 1971, and was modified as the result of constitutional law no. 1 of 22 November 1999 and constitutional law no. 3 of 18 October 18, 2001.

Article 1 defines Veneto as an "autonomous Region", "constituted by the Venetian people and the lands of the provinces of Belluno, Padua, Rovigo, Treviso, Venice, Verona and Vicenza", while maintaining "bonds with Venetians in the world".

Article 2 sets forth the principle of the "self-government of the Venetian people" and mandates the Region to "promote the historical identity of the Venetian people and civilisation".

== Structure ==
This Statute is more oriented toward autonomy for Veneto, albeit within the limits of a Region with ordinary statute. It retains the declaration about "the self-government of the Venetian people", already present in the Statute of 1971. It also contains interesting novelties, as the preservation of the environmental heritage in favour of future generations, as well as the preservation of the cultural and linguistic heritage of Veneto, a federal organization of local powers, and the right to information about the environment and a pluralist information about the Region's activities. It also has some peculiar modern features, such as reference to "biodiversity" and to "the minimum vital daily quantity of water, as a right to life". In addition to this, the Statute makes reference to the law system of the European Union. However, it prevents the people from having an advisory referendum on important matters, such as international treaties and laws deriving from European agreements and directives. This means that the people can neither modify such laws, nor even give an advice on them. It is divided into three sections, which in turn are subdivided into further subsections.

=== First Section ===
The first section contains the general principles and the guidelines for the functioning of the various bodies, as well as for the management of the different types of referendums. It also deals with the citizens' duties and rights.

=== Second Section ===
The second section deals with the division of powers, as well as the functions and the elections of the various political bodies. It vests the legislative power in the Regional Council (art.33, par.2 "The Council determines the political and administrative orientation of the Region and verifies the implementation thereof; it exercises the legislative power...") and vests the executive power in the Regional Junta 'Regional Executive' (art.54, par.1 "The Regional Junta defines and carries out the administration and government goals"), chaired by the President of the Junta, which is also President of the Region. The second section also states that the council is the branch of democratic representation of the Venetian people (art.33, par.1), while the President of the Region represents the Region and steers the Executive branch, for which it is also liable (art.51 par.1).

=== Third Section ===
The third section contains some final provisions for the interpretation and the immediate implementation of the previous articles.

== In the past ==
=== Most Serene Venetian Republic ===
During the period of the Venetian Republic, the Veneto did not have an organic constitution approved by a constituent assembly as happens, instead, in most present-day states. Rather, the balance of powers in the Republic developed gradually as the result of an intertwisted set of interactions between different laws, provisions, regulations and customs of different state bodies which restricted the powers of each other much like today's British unwritten constitution. First restrictions were introduced by the Major Council against the powers of the Doge of Venice, who was elected, but served for a lifelong term. He had to act within the limits of the promissione ducale, a pledge which restricted his powers and was constantly updated, and he also had to cooperate with the Major Council, which in turn could undertake no action without the Doge's consent. Later, other bodies were created, as the Minor Council, the Quarantia (which further controlled the Doge) and the Venetian Senate. The Council of Ten had to ensure that no personal power came to be in the Republic as consequences of putsches, but the powers of this body were in turn limited when the Major Council deemed that they were too broad (they entailed the use of internal espionage) and hence dangerous for the state. Cities under the domain of the Republic were allowed to retain some of their local statutes, albeit under the control of the Dominante. The corpus of laws and customs also constituted the base of the judiciary, providing limits to the judges' powers

=== Austrian Empire to 1970 ===
After Napoleon's invasion of the Venetian Republic, the territory of present-day Veneto was merged with Lombardy and annexed to the Austrian Empire, with the name of Kingdom of Lombardy–Venetia. In fact, the powers of Lombardy–Venetia were exercised by a Viceroy who ruled in the name of the absolute monarch of the Empire, hence one cannot speak of a constitution for this period.

After the annexation to the Kingdom of Italy, later transformed into the Italian Republic, no local authority existed for Veneto as such, until ordinary-statute regions (formally established in 1948) were practically put into effect in 1970. Consequently, no constitution of Veneto existed until 1970–1971.

=== The Statute of 1971 ===
The Statute of 1971, was passed with an overwhelming cross-party majority (49 votes of 50) by the Regional Council and then received the assent of the Italian Parliament as ordinary law no. 340/1971. Some changes were introduced later as an effect of the amendments to the Italian Constitution through constitutional law no. 1 of 22 November 1999 and constitutional law no. 3 of 18 October 2001 which modified the relationship between regions and the state.

The Statute was divided in four sections (Titoli), which described the fundamental principles, the organization and subdivision of powers, their functions and, finally, the procedure to revise the statute.

==== First Section (Fundamental principles) ====
Articles 1–5 constituted the first section and introduced the fundamental principles and policies, such as pursuing realization of the human individual and ensuring liberty, equality, the right to study, to work, to social security and the rights of family, as well as ensuring "social parity" of women. Article 2 stated that "the self-government of the Venetian people is realized in forms corresponding to the characters and the traditions of its history", although this it has not produced any effective powers different from those of any other region with ordinary statute. Article 2 stated also that "the Region cooperates to the promotion of the cultural and linguistic heritage of the communities" of the people described in article 1. This provision is related to a law passed on 28 March 28, 2007, which recognizes Venetian language and its "compositional" nature (i.e. the language is made of different varieties).

==== Second Section (Regional institutions) ====
The second section was formed by articles 6–34 which established the Regional Council of Veneto as regional parliament, the Government of Veneto as regional executive and its President as chief executive. It also established the functions of these three bodies as well as the balance of powers between them.

==== Third Section (Regional functions) ====
Articles 35–63 established the functions of the Region and the procedures to pass laws, budgets and to devolve powers to other local institutions (such as provinces and municipalities). It also vested the legislative power in the council.

==== Fourth Section (Revision) ====
This section consisted of one article, article 64, the provisions of which established the procedure to follow in order to modify the Statute itself.
