= Daniele Polato =

Italian politician (born 1975)

Daniele Polato MEP
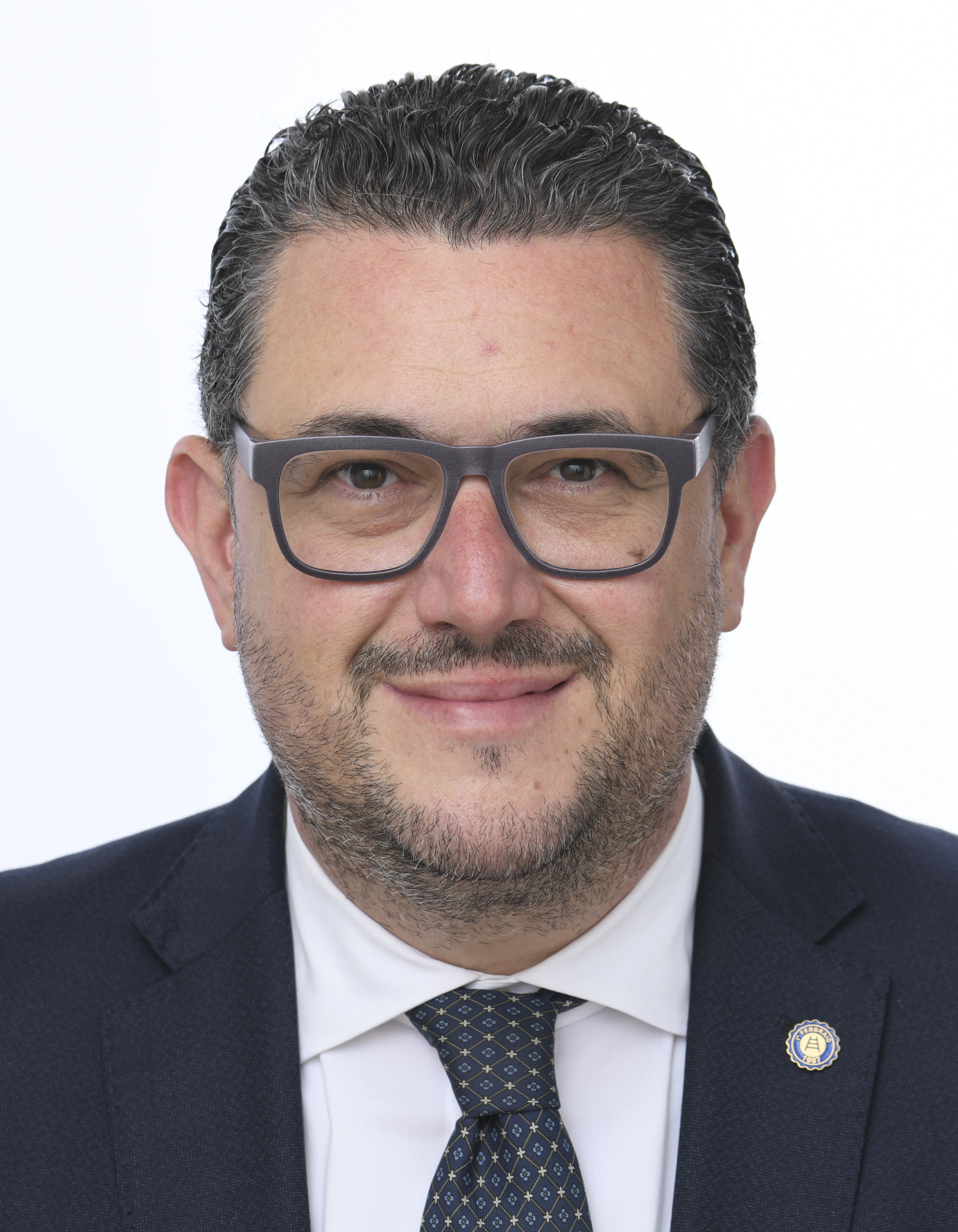
- Polato in 2024

Member of the European Parliament for North-East Italy
- Incumbent
- Assumed office 16 July 2024

Personal details
- Born: 4 June 1975 (age 50) Verona, Italy
- Party: Brothers of Italy
- Other political affiliations: European Conservatives and Reformists Party

Daniele Polato (born 4 June 1975) is an Italian politician of Brothers of Italy who was elected member of the European Parliament in 2024.

== Early life and career ==
Polato was born in Verona in 1975. He served as city councillor of Verona until 2020, when he was elected to the Regional Council of Veneto. In December 2023, he was elected group leader of Brothers of Italy in the regional council.
