= Enoch Soranzo =

Italian politician (born 1974)

Member of the Regional Council of Veneto
- Incumbent
- Assumed office 6 October 2020

President of the Province of Padua
- In office 13 October 2014 – 31 October 2018
- Preceded by: Barbara Degani
- Succeeded by: Fabio Bui

Mayor of Selvazzano Dentro
- In office 23 June 2009 – 29 May 2019

Personal details
- Born: 29 July 1974 (age 52) Padua, Italy
- Party: National Alliance; Brothers of Italy
- Occupation: Entrepreneur

Enoch Soranzo (born 29 July 1974) is an Italian politician serving as a member of the Regional Council of Veneto since 2020. He previously served as president of the Province of Padua from 2014 to 2018.

== Life and career ==
Soranzo was born in 1974 in Padua. In 1998, he began his career as an entrepreneur in the tourism and hospitality sector in Selvazzano Dentro, in the province of Padua.

He entered politics in Selvazzano Dentro as a member of the post-fascist National Alliance. In 2002, he was appointed an external assessor in the municipal government and, in June 2004, was elected to the municipal council. In 2009, he was elected mayor of Selvazzano Dentro and was re-elected in 2014, serving two consecutive terms until 2019.

On 13 October 2014, Soranzo was elected president of the Province of Padua, receiving 54.81% of the weighted vote against 45.19% for Massimiliano Barison, the mayor of Albignasego. Soranzo was supported by a broad coalition including Tosi-aligned members of the Lega Nord, Forza Italia, the Democratic Party and New Centre-Right. He later joined Brothers of Italy.

From 2015 to 2018, he also served on the Veneto Regional Committee for Local Authorities and was president of UPI Veneto. From 2019 to 2023, he served as president of the municipal council of Selvazzano Dentro.

In October 2020, Soranzo was elected to the Regional Council of Veneto, representing the province of Padua. From 2024 to 2025, he served as vice president of the Regional Council. He stood for re-election in the 2025 regional election, finishing as the first unelected candidate in his constituency behind Filippo Giacinti. Following Giacinti's appointment as a regional assessor, Soranzo took his seat on 18 December 2025.
