= Fabio Bui =

Italian politician

President of the Province of Padua
- In office 31 October 2018 – 12 June 2022
- Preceded by: Enoch Soranzo
- Succeeded by: Sergio Giordani

Mayor of Loreggia
- In office 7 May 2012 – 13 June 2022
- Preceded by: Maria Grazia Peron
- Succeeded by: Manuela Marangon

Personal details
- Born: 28 June 1965 (age 61) Venice, Italy
- Occupation: Public administration employee

Fabio Bui (born 28 June 1965) is an Italian politician and public administrator who served as president of the Province of Padua from 2018 to 2022.

== Life and career ==
Bui was born in Venice in 1965. He holds an upper-secondary education qualification and worked as an employee in local public administration in a managerial position.

In 1999, he entered local politics in Loreggia, in the province of Padua, and was elected to the municipal council on a centrist civic list. He was subsequently re-elected to the council in 2002 and 2007. From 2002 to 2012 he served as a municipal assessor and deputy mayor of Loreggia.

In the 2012 local elections, Bui was elected mayor of Loreggia with the civic list "Loreggia Domani", receiving 43.07% of the vote. He was re-elected in the 2017 local elections.

In October 2014, Bui was elected to the Provincial Council of Padua and became vice president of the province under president Enoch Soranzo. He was re-elected to the provincial council in 2017.

On 31 October 2018, Bui was elected president of the Province of Padua, succeeding Soranzo. He was the sole candidate and was supported by the centre-left and the Democratic Party. The election was held among the province's 1,386 eligible municipal representatives, and Bui was elected without opposition.

In 2025, Bui was the candidate of the Populars for Veneto for president of Veneto in the 2025 Venetian regional election. His candidacy was initially excluded during the filing process but was admitted following an appeal to the Court of Appeal of Venice. Bui finished fifth with 9,590 votes (0.51%), while the Populars for Veneto received 6,071 votes (0.36%) and won no seats.
