= Massanzago =

- Comune
- Comune di Massanzago
- Location within Italy Location within Veneto
- Coordinates: 45°33′N 12°1′E
- Country: Italy
- Region: Veneto
- Province: Province of Padua (PD)

Area
  - Total: 13.2 km^{2} (5.1 sq mi)
- Elevation: 18 m (59 ft)

Population (Dec. 2004)
  - Total: 5,163
  - Density: 391/km^{2} (1,010/sq mi)
- Time zone: UTC+1 (CET)
  - Summer (DST): UTC+2 (CEST)
- Postal code: 35010
- Dialing code: 049
- Website: Official website

Massanzago is a comune (municipality) in the Province of Padua in the Italian region Veneto, located about 25 kilometres (16 mi) northwest of Venice and about 20 kilometres (12 mi) northeast of Padua. As of 31 December 2004, it had a population of 5,163 and an area of 13.2 square kilometres (5.1 mi^{2}).

Massanzago borders the following municipalities: Borgoricco, Camposampiero, Noale, Santa Maria di Sala, Trebaseleghe.

== Demographic evolution ==
Historical population

Year	Pop.	±%
1861	?	—
1871	1,666	—
1881	1,896	+13.8%
1901	2,145	+13.1%
1911	2,613	+21.8%

Year	Pop.	±%
1921	2,829	+8.3%
1931	2,991	+5.7%
1936	2,987	−0.1%
1951	3,122	+4.5%
1961	2,792	−10.6%

Year	Pop.	±%
1971	2,620	−6.2%
1981	2,898	+10.6%
1991	3,543	+22.3%
2001	4,703	+32.7%

Source: Data from ISTAT
