= Raffaele Speranzon =

Italian politician (born 1971)

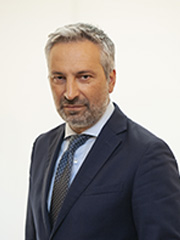
- Speranzon in 2022

Member of the Senate
- Incumbent
- Assumed office 13 October 2022
- Constituency: Veneto – 01

Personal details
- Born: 7 October 1971 (age 54)
- Party: Brothers of Italy (since 2012)

Raffaele Speranzon (born 7 October 1971) is an Italian politician serving as a member of the Senate since 2022. From 2020 to 2022, he was a member of the Regional Council of Veneto.
