= Lucas Pavanetto =

Italian politician (born 1982)

Vice President of Veneto
- Incumbent
- Assumed office 13 December 2025
- President: Alberto Stefani

Personal details
- Born: 2 April 1982 (age 44)
- Party: Brothers of Italy

Lucas Pavanetto (born 2 April 1982) is an Italian politician serving as vice president of Veneto and as regional minister of tourism and labour since 2025. He has served as group leader of Brothers of Italy in the Regional Council of Veneto since 2024. He previously served as coordinator of the party in the Metropolitan City of Venice.
