= 1975 Venetian regional election =

Italian regional election

The Venetian regional election of 1975 took place on 15 June 1975. Ten new seats were added to the Regional Council following the 1971 census.

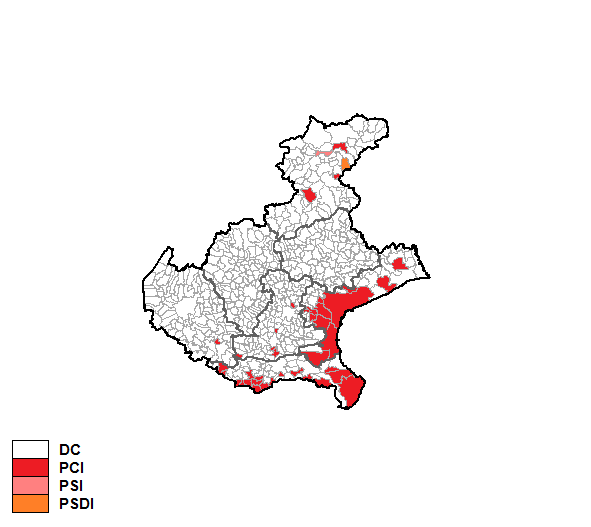
Largest party by municipality

== Events ==
Christian Democracy was by far the largest party, securing a full majority. After the election, Christian Democrat Angelo Tomelleri was re-elected President of the Region at the head of a coalition comprising also the Italian Republican Party, which anyway left in 1977.

== Results ==
Party	votes	votes (%)	seats
Christian Democracy	1,338,338	48.0	31
Italian Communist Party	636,627	22.8	14
Italian Socialist Party	357,189	12.8	8
Italian Democratic Socialist Party	175,539	6.3	3
Italian Social Movement	105,372	3.8	2
Italian Republican Party	69,347	2.5	1
Italian Liberal Party	63,518	2.3	1
Proletarian Democracy	41,384	1.5	-
Total	2,787,314	100.0	60

Source: Regional Council of Veneto
