= 1980 Venetian regional election =

Italian regional election

The Venetian regional election of 1980 took place on 8 June 1980.

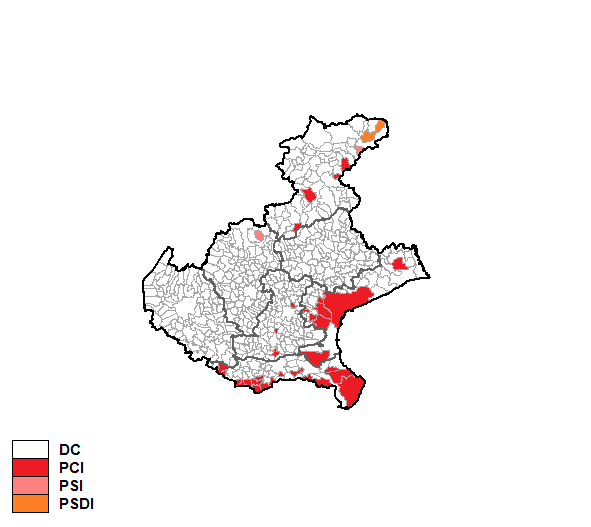
Largest party by municipality

== Events ==
Christian Democracy was by far the largest party, securing a full majority. After the election Christian Democrat Carlo Bernini formed a government which comprised briefly the Italian Democratic Socialist Party (1980–1981).

== Results ==
Party	votes	votes (%)	seats
Christian Democracy	1,387,735	49.4	32
Italian Communist Party	611,059	21.8	13
Italian Socialist Party	340,138	12.1	7
Italian Democratic Socialist Party	150,766	5.4	2
Italian Social Movement	101,879	3.6	2
Italian Liberal Party	73,960	2.6	1
Italian Republican Party	73,196	2.6	1
Party of Proletarian Unity	29,975	1.1	1
Proletarian Democracy	26,920	1.0	1
Venetian League	13,236	0.5	-
Total	2,808,264	100.0	60

Source: Regional Council of Veneto
