= Francesco Calzavara =

Italian politician

Francesco Calzavara (born 18 September 1964 in San Donà di Piave) is a Venetist politician from Veneto, Italy.

A member of Liga Veneta–Lega Nord since 1993, Calzavara was long active in municipal politics in his hometown, Jesolo. Having followed Renato Martin out of Liga Veneta, Calzavara was elected mayor in 2002 by beating in the run-off the centre-right candidate supported also by his former party. After breaking with Martin and returning to the party's fold, Calzavara was re-elected mayor in 2007 by beating Martin. Between 2012 and 2015 Calzavara was the municipal secretary of Liga Veneta in Jesolo.

In the 2015 regional election Calzavara was first elected to the Regional Council of Veneto, where he presided a committee for five years. Re-elected in the 2020 regional election, Calzavara was appointed regional minister of Planning, Budget, Patrimony and Local Government in Luca Zaia's third government.
