= Diego Ruzza =

Italian politician (born 1973)

Minister of Transport and Mobility of Veneto
- Incumbent
- Assumed office 13 December 2025
- President: Alberto Stefani

Personal details
- Born: 4 August 1973 (age 52)
- Party: Brothers of Italy

Diego Ruzza (born 4 August 1973) is an Italian politician serving as minister of transport and mobility of Veneto since 2025. From 2012 to 2022, he served as mayor of Zevio.
