= 2025 Venetian regional election =

Italian regional election

- 23–24 November 2025

All 51 seats to the Regional Council of Veneto
- Opinion polls
- Registered: 4,294,608
- Turnout: 44.65% (▼16.51%)
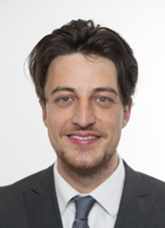

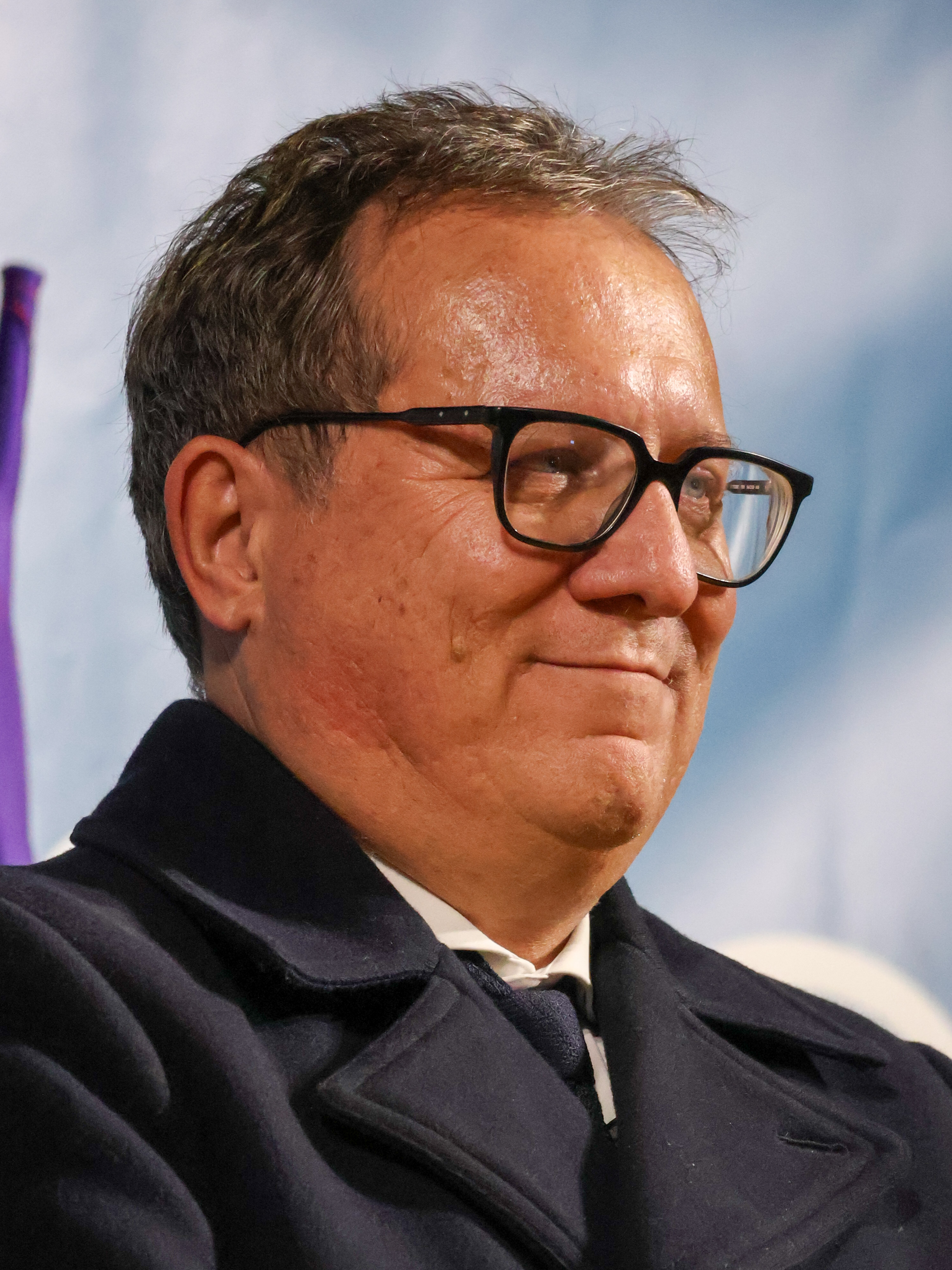

	Majority party	Minority party	Third party
Leader	Alberto Stefani	Giovanni Manildo	Riccardo Szumski
Party	League	PD	RV
Alliance	Centre-right	Centre-left
Seats won	34	15	2
Seat change	▼7	▲5 (Note: This is compared to the total of Arturo Lorenzoni (Centre-left coalition) and Enrico Cappelletti (M5S) in 2020.)	New
Popular vote	1,211,356	543,278	96,474
Percentage	64.39%	28.88%	5.13%
Swing	▼12.40%	▲9.91%	New
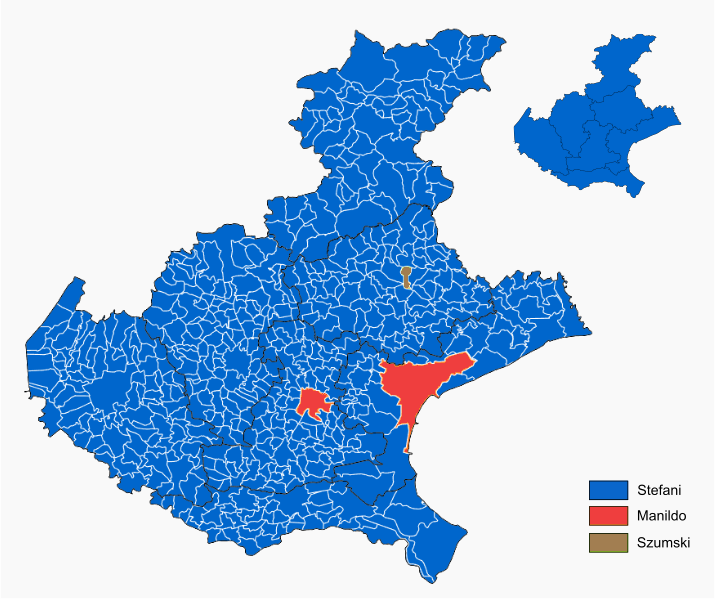
- Map of the election result
President before election
Luca Zaia
Lega
Elected President
Alberto Stefani
Lega

The 2025 Venetian regional election was held in Veneto, Italy from 23 to 24 November 2025.

== Electoral system ==
The Regional Council of Veneto is composed of 51 members. The president elect is the candidate winning a plurality of votes. 49 council seats are distributed according to proportional representation, with a majority bonus system assigning 60% of the 50 seats to the lists running with the candidate winning more than 40% of the votes. A single list must win at least 3% of the votes in order to access the seats distribution, while a coalition must win over 5% of the votes. The president and the second place presidential candidate automatically becomes a member of the council.

Seat distribution of the Regional Council of Veneto
Provinces	Seats
Belluno	2
Padua	9
Rovigo	2
Treviso	9
Venice	9
Verona	9
Vicenza	9
President	1
Runner-up	1
Total	51

== Parties and candidates ==
=== Main presidential candidates ===
Candidate	Experience	Alliance
Alberto Stefani	Member of the Chamber of Deputies (2018–2025); Mayor of Borgoricco (2019–2024); Regional Commissioner/Secretary of Liga Veneta (2020–2026); Federal Deputy Secretary of Lega (2024–present)	Centre-right coalition
Giovanni Manildo	Mayor of Treviso (2013–2018)	Centre-left coalition

=== Parties and coalitions ===
Political party or alliance	Constituent lists	Previous result		Candidate
Political party or alliance	Constituent lists	Votes (%)	Seats	Candidate
Centre-right coalition	League–Venetian League	23.1	13	Alberto Stefani
Centre-right coalition	Brothers of Italy (incl. CI)	9.6	5	Alberto Stefani
Centre-right coalition	Forza Italia	3.6	2	Alberto Stefani
Centre-right coalition	Liga Veneta Repubblica (incl. part of IV)	2.4	1	Alberto Stefani
Centre-right coalition	Union of the Centre (incl. PdF)	—N/a	—N/a	Alberto Stefani
Centre-right coalition	Us Moderates	—N/a	—N/a	Alberto Stefani
Centre-left coalition	Democratic Party	11.9	6	Giovanni Manildo
Centre-left coalition	Five Star Movement	2.7	1	Giovanni Manildo
Centre-left coalition	Greens and Left Alliance	1.7	1	Giovanni Manildo
Centre-left coalition	United for Manildo for President (incl. part of Az, IV, +E, PSI)	—N/a	—N/a	Giovanni Manildo
Centre-left coalition	Peace Health Work (incl. PRC)	0.6	–	Giovanni Manildo
Centre-left coalition	The Venetian Civic Lists	—N/a	—N/a	Giovanni Manildo
Centre-left coalition	Volt Italy	—N/a	—N/a	Giovanni Manildo
Resist Veneto (incl. Vita, part of IV and other groups)		—N/a	—N/a	Riccardo Szumski
Sovereign Popular Democracy		—N/a	—N/a	Marco Rizzo
Populars for Veneto		—N/a	—N/a	Fabio Bui

== Campaign ==
=== Debate ===
Date	Location	Organizer	Link	Participant					Source
P Present A Absent invited NI Not invited I Invited				Stefani	Manildo	Rizzo	Szumski	Bui	Source
17 November 2025	Rome	Sky TG24	Video	P	P	NI	NI	NI	

== Opinion polls ==
=== Presidential candidates ===
Publication date	Institute	Client	Sample	Margin of error	Stefani	Manildo	Szumski	Rizzo	Bui	Abstentions/Undecided
Publication date	Institute	Client	Sample	Margin of error	CDX	CSX–M5S	Szumski	Rizzo	Bui	Abstentions/Undecided
5 November 2025	Demos–Demetra	Il Gazzettino	500	±4	58–62	32–36	2–6	0–4		39–43
5 November 2025	Noto	Porta a Porta	–	–	61.0	35.0	4			–
6 November 2025	Ipsos	Corriere della Sera	800	±3.5	62.8	26.9	5.6	2.7	1.9	19

=== Electoral lists ===
Publication date	Institute	Client	Sample	Margin of error	LV	FdI	FI	UdC	LVR	NM	PD	M5S	AVS	UpM	CV	Volt	PRC	RV	DSP	PpV	Lead
5 November 2025	Demos–Demetra	Il Gazzettino	500	±4	22–26	21–25	8–12	1–5			16–20	0–4	4–8	4–8	4–12			2–10			1
6 November 2025	Ipsos	Corriere della Sera	800	±3.5	23.6	23.2	8.5	5.6	1.5	1.0	14.8	2.6	3.8	2.3	1.5	0.7	0.7	5.7	2.7	1.8	0.4

== Outcome ==
=== Result ===
23–24 November 2025 Venetian regional election results
Candidates	Votes	%	Seats	Parties	Votes	%	Seats
Alberto Stefani	1,211,356	64.39	1	League–Venetian League	607,220	36.28	19
Alberto Stefani	1,211,356	64.39	1	Brothers of Italy	312,839	18.69	9
Alberto Stefani	1,211,356	64.39	1	Forza Italia	105,375	6.30	3
Alberto Stefani	1,211,356	64.39	1	Liga Veneta Repubblica	30,703	1.83	1
Alberto Stefani	1,211,356	64.39	1	Union of the Centre	28,109	1.68	1
Alberto Stefani	1,211,356	64.39	1	Us Moderates	18,768	1.12	0
Alberto Stefani	1,211,356	64.39	1	Total	1,103,014	65.90	33
Giovanni Manildo	543,278	28.88	1	Democratic Party	277,945	16.60	9
Giovanni Manildo	543,278	28.88	1	Greens and Left Alliance	77,621	4.64	2
Giovanni Manildo	543,278	28.88	1	Five Star Movement	36,866	2.20	1
Giovanni Manildo	543,278	28.88	1	United for Manildo for President	35,669	2.13	1
Giovanni Manildo	543,278	28.88	1	The Venetian Civic Lists	24,926	1.49	1
Giovanni Manildo	543,278	28.88	1	Peace Health Work	10,430	0.62	0
Giovanni Manildo	543,278	28.88	1	Volt	5,339	0.32	0
Giovanni Manildo	543,278	28.88	1	Total	468,796	28.01	14
Riccardo Szumski	96,474	5.13	0	Resist Veneto	83,054	4.96	2
Marco Rizzo	20,574	1.09	0	Sovereign Popular Democracy	12,941	0.77	0
Fabio Bui	9,590	0.51	0	Populars for Veneto	6,071	0.36	0
Blank and invalid votes	36,305	1.89					
Total candidates	1,881,272	100.0	2	Total parties	1,673,876	100.0	49
Registered voters/turnout	1,917,577	44.65					
Source: Veneto Region – Results

Popular vote by party
Lega	36.28%
FdI	18.69%
PD	16.60%
FI	6.30%
RV	4.96%
AVS	4.64%
M5S	2.20%
UpM	2.13%
LVR	1.83%
UdC	1.68%
LCV	1.49%
NM	1.12%
Others	2.08%

Popular vote by president
Stefani	64.39%
Manildo	28.88%
Szumski	5.13%
Rizzo	1.09%
Bui	0.51%

=== Turnout ===
Voter turnout
Constituency	Sunday, November 23			Monday, November 24	Previous Election	
Constituency	12:00 PM	19:00 PM	23:00 PM	15:00 PM	Previous Election	
Belluno	8.00%	22.72%	25.96%	35.29%	47.84%	▼12.55%
Padua	10.88%	32.25%	37.67%	49.04%	65.43%	▼16.39%
Rovigo	9.39%	26.36%	30.58%	41.19%	59.88%	▼18.69%
Treviso	9.83%	29.05%	33.31%	43.78%	58.27%	▼14.49%
Venice	10.25%	28.92%	33.24%	44.00%	62.52%	▼21.52%
Verona	10.00%	29.00%	33.74%	44.75%	61.95%	▼17.20%
Vicenza	10.39%	29.85%	34.40%	45.10%	61.80%	▼16.70%
(Veneto) Total	10.10%	29.30%	33.87%	44.64%	61.16%	▼16.52%

=== Analysis ===
Stefani won nearly two-thirds of the vote, defeating Manildo by 35.5 percentage points. His highest support came from the Province of Verona, where he received 69.4% of the vote. Manildo exceeded 30% only in the Metropolitan City of Venice (35.14%) and the Province of Padua (30.37%) and Belluno (30.17%).

The "Resist Veneto" list, led by Riccardo Szumski, received 5% of the regional vote and entered the council. Its strongest results were in northern Veneto, with 10.33% in the Province of Treviso and 6.67% in Belluno.

Stefani won all but three comuni in the region, including 38 of the 40 municipalities with over 20,000 residents. Manildo won pluralities in Padua (by 1%) and Venice (by 0.5%). He also remained competitive in Treviso and Belluno, staying above 40% in both, and reached 39.45% in Vicenza. In Verona, Stefani led with 58.2%, 21 points ahead of Manildo.

Szumski’s list performed particularly well in northern Treviso, earning 14.18% in Conegliano and 13.75% in Vittorio Veneto. In Santa Lucia di Piave, where Szumski previously served as mayor, he won 43.15%, finishing six points ahead of Stefani. Bui received 7.79% in Loreggia, where he was formerly mayor, while Stefani won his own former municipality, Borgoricco, with 81.39%.

Manildo V Stefani V Szumski by provinces
Province	Giovanni Manildo	Alberto Stefani	Riccardo Szumski	Others
Verona	86,918 25.96%	232,304 69.39%	9,968 2.98%	5,580 1.66%
Vicenza	92,509 26.99%	230,081 67.12%	15,265 4.45%	4,956 1.44%
Belluno	22,677 30.17%	45,961 61.14%	5,011 6.67%	1,527 2.03%
Treviso	93,613 26.20%	221,842 62.09%	36,898 10.33%	4,941 1.38%
Padua	115,880 30.37%	244,642 64.11%	14,335 3.76%	6,760 1.77%
Venice	107,836 35.14%	181,234 59.05%	12,631 4.12%	5,213 1.70%
Rovigo	23,845 28.84%	55,292 66.87%	2,366 2.86%	1,187 1.44%

Manildo V Stefani V Szumski by major cities
City	Giovanni Manildo	Alberto Stefani	Riccardo Szumski	Others
Verona	34,533 37.16%	54,057 58.17%	2,585 2.78%	1,762 1.90%
Venice	40,915 47.70%	40,516 47.24%	2,737 3.19%	1,599 1.87%
Padua	39,202 48.38%	38,374 47.35%	1,883 2.32%	1,578 1.95%
Vicenza	15,891 39.46%	22,487 55.84%	1,213 3.01%	683 1.70%
Treviso	14,351 42.25%	17,432 51.33%	1,710 5.03%	470 1.39%
Rovigo	6,444 33.20%	12,218 62.94%	498 2.57%	251 1.29%
Chioggia	4,680 29.03%	10,854 67.32%	349 2.16%	239 1.49%
Bassano del Grappa	5,891 35.46%	9,763 58.76%	717 4.32%	244 1.47%
San Dona di Piave	4,780 29.67%	10,368 64.37%	733 4.55%	227 1.41%
Schio	6,145 41.42%	7,638 51.48%	783 5.28%	270 1.82%
Mira	5,817 42.48%	7,160 52.28%	490 3.58%	228 1.66%
Belluno	5,644 41.25%	7,031 51.38%	740 5.41%	269 1.96%
Conegliano	3,685 28.02%	7,402 56.28%	1,865 14.18%	200 1.52%
Castelfranco Veneto	4,855 34.90%	7,981 57.36%	858 6.17%	219 1.58%
Villafranca di Verona	3,299 26.88%	8,537 69.57%	284 2.31%	151 1.23%
Montebelluna	3,329 27.80%	7,620 63.64%	891 7.44%	134 1.12%
Mogliano Veneto	4,594 40.58%	5,973 52.76%	525 4.64%	230 2.03%
Spinea	4,241 41.68%	5,375 52.83%	390 3.83%	168 1.65%
Albignasego	3,742 29.34	8,520 66.79%	310 2.43%	184 1.44%
Vittorio Veneto	3,474 32.57%	5,564 52.17%	1,467 13.75%	161 1.51%

=== Elected councilors ===
Party / List	Councilor elected	Preference votes	Constituency

== See also ==
- 2025 Italian local elections
