= Filippo Giacinti =

Italian politician (born 1974)

Minister of Budget, Personnel, Patrimony and Legal Affairs of Veneto
- Incumbent
- Assumed office 13 December 2025
- President: Alberto Stefani

Personal details
- Born: 18 November 1974 (age 51)
- Party: Brothers of Italy

Filippo Giacinti (born 18 November 1974) is an Italian politician serving as minister of budget, personnel, patrimony and legal affairs of Veneto since 2025. He has been a member of the Regional Council of Veneto since 2025. From 2016 to 2025, he served as mayor of Albignasego.
