= Franco Frigo =

Italian politician

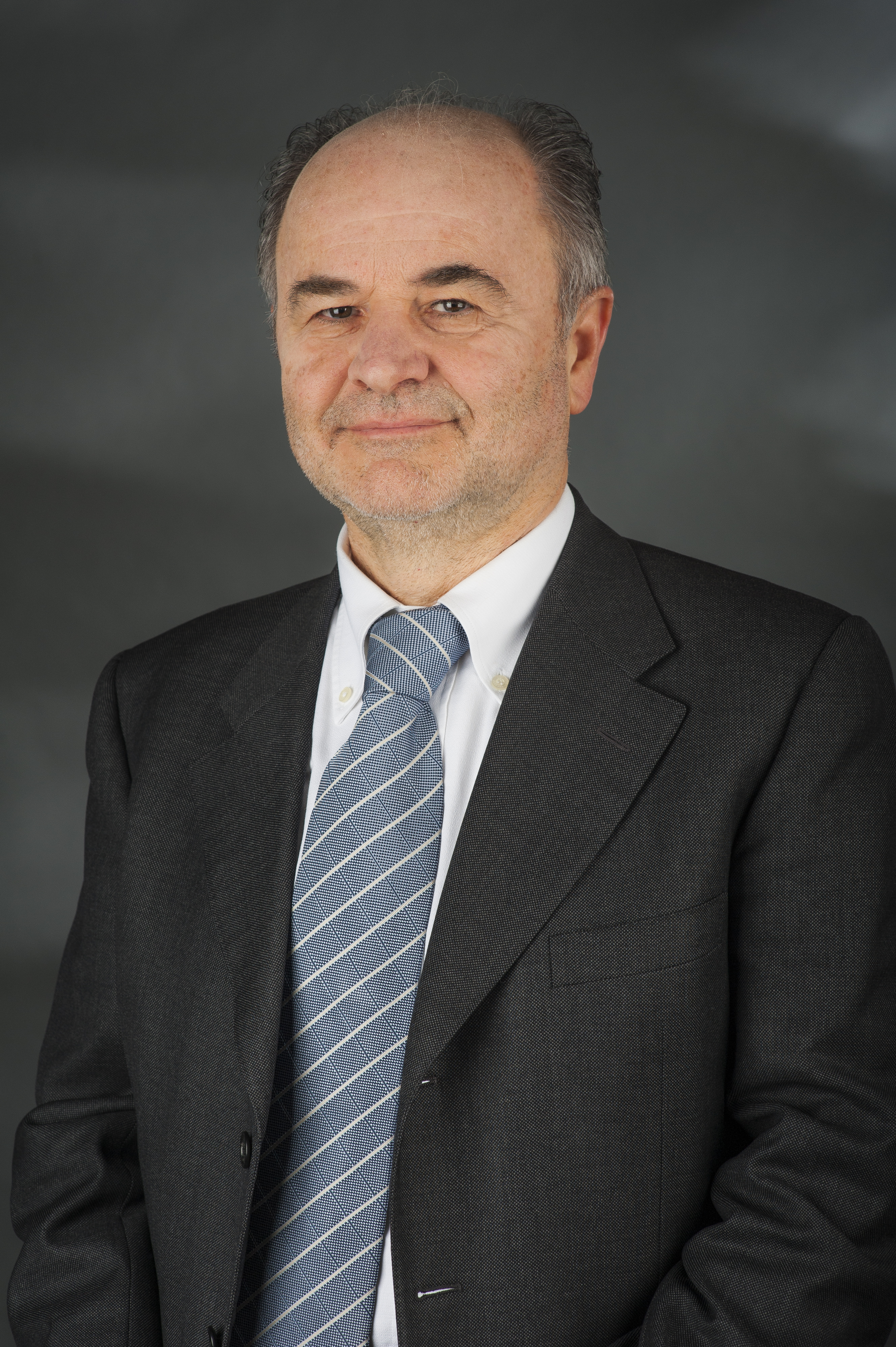
Frigo in 2014

Franco Frigo (born 13 August 1950, in Cittadella) is an Italian politician from Veneto.

A long-time Christian Democrat, he was President of the Province of Padua from 1985 to 1990. He was first elected to the Regional Council of Veneto in 1990 and amid the Tangentopoli scandals, he was briefly President of Veneto (1992–1993). He returned to the Regional Council in 2000 and was re-elected in 2005. He retired in 2010, after an unsuccessful bid to become a member of the European Parliament in 2009. However, in 2013 he entered the European Parliament, succeeding to Debora Serracchiani.
