= Marco Zecchinato =

Italian politician (born 1976)

Minister of Internationalization, European Union Affairs, Attractiveness, Urban Planning, Venetian Identity and Local Government of Veneto
- Incumbent
- Assumed office 13 December 2025
- President: Alberto Stefani

Personal details
- Born: 3 February 1976 (age 50)
- Party: Lega

Marco Zecchinato (born 3 February 1976) is an Italian politician serving as minister of Local Authorities, Infrastructure, Strategic Planning, Interregional Cooperation, Spatial and Urban planning, UNESCO sites, Venetian identity and ESG Enterprises of Veneto since 2025. He has been a member of the Regional Council of Veneto since 2020. From 2006 to 2016, he served as mayor of Orgiano.
