= 1970 Venetian regional election =

Italian regional election

The Venetian regional election of 1970 took place on 7–8 June 1970.

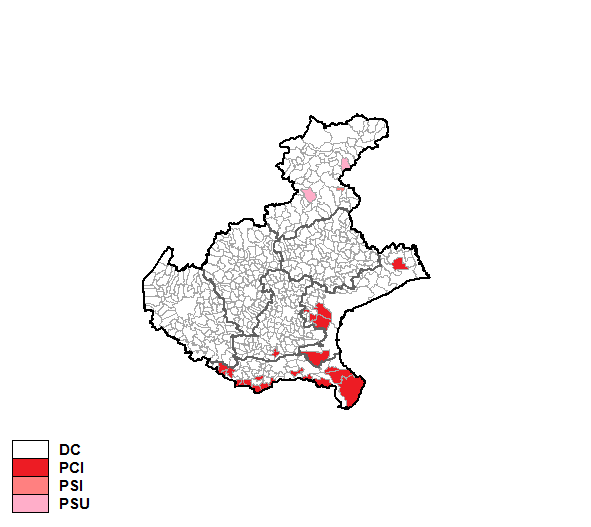
Largest party by municipality

== Events ==
Christian Democracy was by far the largest party, securing a full majority. After the election the Christian Democrats formed a one-party government under the leadership of Angelo Tomelleri, who was briefly replaced by Paolo Feltrin in 1972–1973.

== Results ==
Party	votes	votes (%)	seats
Christian Democracy	1,287,167	51.9	28
Italian Communist Party	417,204	16.8	9
Italian Socialist Party	259,174	10.4	5
Unitary Socialist Party	189,246	7.6	3
Italian Liberal Party	105,266	4.2	2
Italian Socialist Party of Proletarian Unity	86,030	3.5	1
Italian Social Movement	81,369	3.3	1
Italian Republican Party	46,762	1.9	1
Social Democracy	4,329	0.2	-
Italian Democratic Party of Monarchist Unity	4,092	0.2	-
Total	2,480,639	100.0	50

Source: Regional Council of Veneto

=== Seats by province ===
Province	DC	PCI	PSI	PSU	PLI	PSIUP	MSI	PRI	Total
Venice	4	3	1	1	1	1	-	1	12
Verona	5	1	1	1	-	-	1	-	9
Padua	5	2	1	-	1	-	-	-	9
Treviso	5	1	1	1	-	-	-	-	8
Vicenza	6	1	1	-	-	-	-	-	8
Rovigo	1	1	-	-	-	-	-	-	2
Belluno	2	-	-	-	-	-	-	-	2
Total	28	9	5	3	2	1	1	1	50
