= Dario Bond =

Italian politician (born 1961)

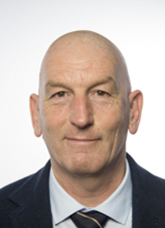
- Born: 18 May 1961 (age 65); Feltre, Italy
- Occupation: politician
- Years active: 2005–2015
- Political party: Forza Italia, The People of Freedom

Dario Bond (born 18 May 1961) is an Italian politician from Veneto.

He was first elected to the Regional Council of Veneto in 2005 for Forza Italia. Re-elected in 2010, he was floor leader of The People of Freedom from 2010 to 2015.
