= Government of Veneto =

Italian regional government

The Regional Government of Veneto (Giunta Regionale del Veneto) is the executive of Veneto, one of the twenty regions of Italy. The Regional Government, which has its seat at Palazzo Balbi on the Grand Canal, is led by the President of Veneto, who is elected for a five-year term, and composed of the President and ten Ministers (Assessori), including a Vice President.

== Current composition ==
The next government will be formed by Alberto Stefani within 10 days from his swearing in.

== List of previous governments ==
Luca Zaia is the ninth President of Veneto. His predecessor Giancarlo Galan (1995–2010) has been the longest-serving President so far. Since direct election of the President was introduced in 1995-2000, Venetian politics has become far more stable and governments generally last for a full term of five years.

Governments of Veneto
Government	President	Party	Coalition	Vice President	Party	Term	Legislature
Tomelleri I	Angelo Tomelleri	DC	DC	Paolo Tartari	DC	1970–1971	I Legislature
Tomelleri II	Angelo Tomelleri	DC	DC	Paolo Tartari	DC	1971–1972	I Legislature
Feltrin	Piero Feltrin	DC	DC	Paolo Tartari	DC	1972–1973	I Legislature
Tomelleri III	Angelo Tomelleri	DC	DC	Marino Cortese	DC	1973–1975	I Legislature
Tomelleri IV	Angelo Tomelleri	DC	DC–PRI	Giancarlo Gambaro	DC	1975–1977	II Legislature
Tomelleri V	Angelo Tomelleri	DC	DC	Marino Cortese	DC	1977–1980	II Legislature
Bernini I	Carlo Bernini	DC	DC–PSDI (Note: The PSDI joined the government in 1981.)	Marino Cortese	DC	1980–1985	III Legislature
Bernini II	Carlo Bernini	DC	DC–PSI–PSDI–PLI	Umberto Carraro	PSI	1985–1989	IV Legislature
Cremonese I	Gianfranco Cremonese	DC	DC–PSI–PSDI–PLI	Umberto Carraro	PSI	1989–1990	IV Legislature
Cremonese II	Gianfranco Cremonese	DC	DC–PSI–PRI–PSDI	Amalia Sartori	PSI	1990–1992	V Legislature
Frigo	Franco Frigo	DC	DC–PSI–FdV	Renzo Burro	PSI	1992–1993	V Legislature
Pupillo	Giuseppe Pupillo	PDS	DC–PDS (Note: The PDS succeeded to the PCI in 1991.)–PSI–FdV–UPV	Carlo Alberto Tesserin	DC	1993–1994	V Legislature
Bottin	Aldo Bottin	PPI	PPI (Note: The PPI succeeded to the DC in 1994.)–LV–FI (Note: Some members of the disbanded DC formed FI in 1994.)–UPV–PLI–CPA–LP	Gian Paolo Gobbo	LV	1994–1995	V Legislature
Galan I	Giancarlo Galan	FI	FI–AN–CDU (Note: The regional councillors of the CDU were elected from a joint list with FI.)–CCD	Bruno Canella	AN	1995–2000	VI Legislature
Galan II	Giancarlo Galan	FI	FI–LV–AN–CDU (Note: The CDU and the CCD were merged into the UDC in 2002.)–CCD	Fabio Gava	FI	2000–2005	VII Legislature
Galan III	Giancarlo Galan	FI	FI (Note: FI and AN were merged into the PdL in 2009.)–LV–AN–UDC–NPSI	Luca Zaia (until 2008); Franco Manzato (since 2008)	LV	2005–2010	VIII Legislature
Zaia I	Luca Zaia	LV	LV–PdL (Note: The PdL was disbanded in 2013; its members joined either FI or the NCD. Vice President Marino Zorzato joined the NCD.)	Marino Zorzato	PdL	2010–2015	IX Legislature
Zaia II	Luca Zaia	LV	LV–FI (Note: The party's sole regional minister, Elena Donazzan left in 2018 and joined FdI in 2019.)	Gianluca Forcolin	LV	2015–2020	X Legislature
Zaia III	Luca Zaia	LV	LV–FdI	Elisa De Berti	LV	2020–2025	XI Legislature
Stefani	Alberto Stefani	LV	LV–FdI–FI	TBD	TBD	2025–present	XII Legislature

Source: Region of Veneto
