= Borgoricco =

- Comune
- Comune di Borgoricco
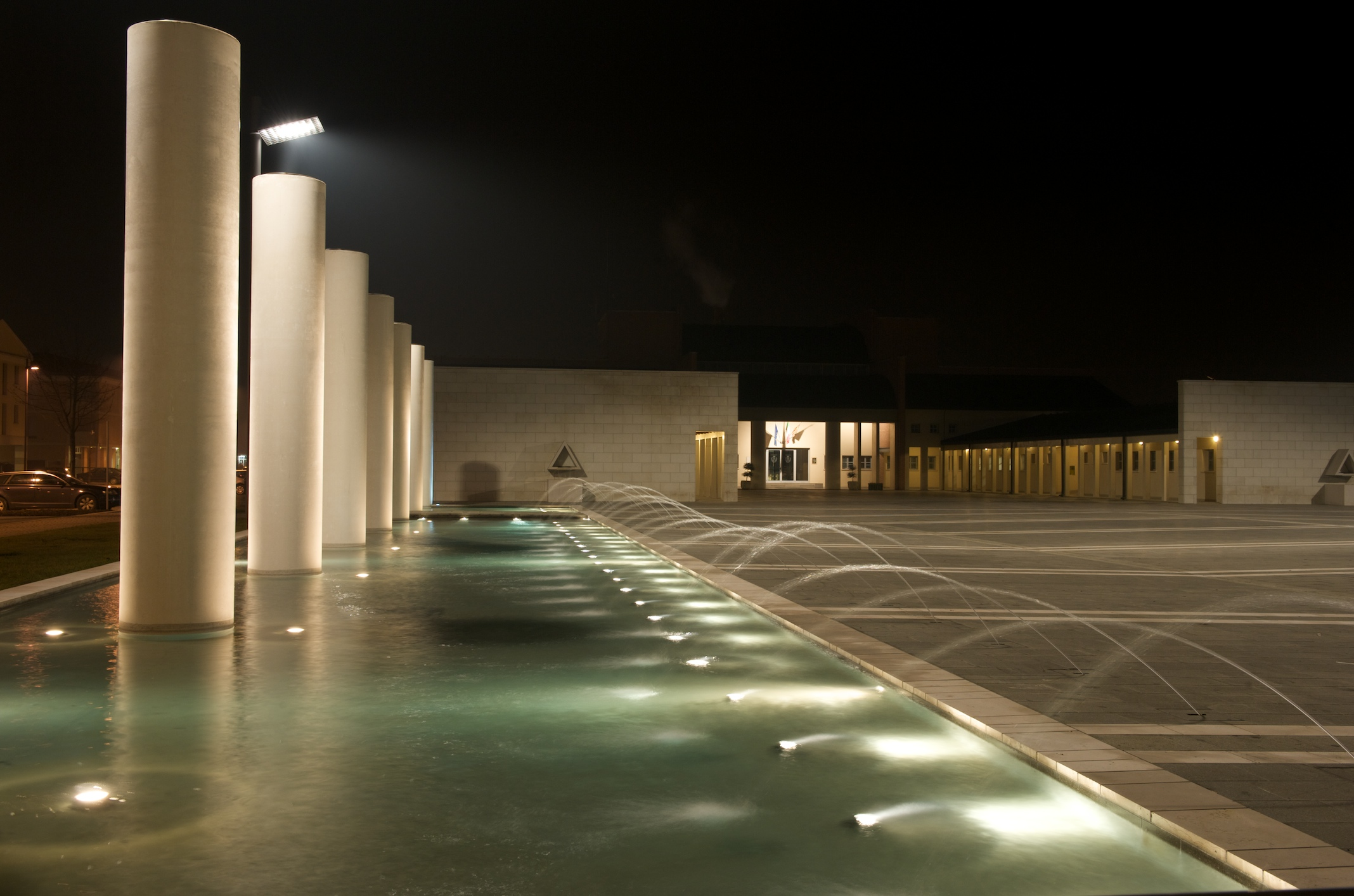
- Central square

- Coat of arms

- Location within Italy Location within Veneto
- Coordinates: 45°31′N 11°58′E
- Country: Italy
- Region: Veneto
- Province: Padua (PD)
- Frazioni: Sant'Eufemia, San Michele delle Badesse

Government
  - Mayor: Gianluca Pedron

Area
  - Total: 20.5 km^{2} (7.9 sq mi)
- Elevation: 18 m (59 ft)

Population (2008)
  - Total: 8,163
  - Density: 398/km^{2} (1,030/sq mi)
- Demonym: Borgoricchesi
- Time zone: UTC+1 (CET)
  - Summer (DST): UTC+2 (CEST)
- Postal code: 35010
- Dialing code: 049
- Website: Official website

Borgoricco is a comune (municipality) in the Province of Padua in the Italian region Veneto, located about 30 kilometres (19 mi) northwest of Venice and about 14 kilometres (9 mi) northeast of Padua. Borgoricco borders the following municipalities: Campodarsego, Camposampiero, Massanzago, San Giorgio delle Pertiche, Santa Maria di Sala, Villanova di Camposampiero.

== Twin towns ==
Borgoricco is twinned with:

- Kemerhisar, Turkey, since 2003
