= Elisa Venturini =

Italian politician (born 1979)

Minister of Environment and Civil Protection of Veneto
- Incumbent
- Assumed office 16 December 2025
- President: Alberto Stefani

Personal details
- Born: 4 March 1979 (age 47)
- Party: Forza Italia

Elisa Venturini (born 4 March 1979) is an Italian politician serving as minister of environment and civil protection of Veneto since 2025. From 2008 to 2018, she served as mayor of Casalserugo.
