= Angelo Tomelleri =

Italian politician (1924–1985)

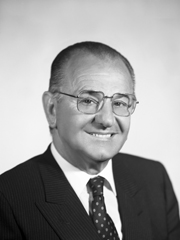
- Tomelleri in 1983

President of Veneto
- In office 1 August 1970 – 25 May 1972
- Preceded by: Office established
- Succeeded by: Pietro Feltrin
- In office 13 March 1973 – 3 August 1980
- Preceded by: Pietro Feltrin
- Succeeded by: Carlo Bernini

President of the Province of Verona
- In office 1965–1970
- Preceded by: Renato Gozzi
- Succeeded by: Giorgio Zanotto

Member of the Senate of the Republic
- In office 19 July 1983 – 23 June 1985
- Succeeded by: Giuliano Gusso
- Constituency: Veneto

Personal details
- Born: 26 June 1924 Verona, Kingdom of Italy
- Died: 23 June 1985 (aged 60) Verona, Italy
- Party: Christian Democracy
- Education: University of Padua
- Profession: Civil engineer

Angelo Tomelleri (26 June 1924 – 23 June 1985) was an Italian politician of Christian Democracy. He was the first president of Veneto, serving from 1970 to 1972 and from 1973 to 1980, and previously served as president of the Province of Verona.
