= Valeria Mantovan =

Italian politician (born 1990)

Valeria Mantovan (born 2 August 1990) is an Italian politician from Veneto. Born in Rovigo, she is half-Egyptian and has a degree in law.

She joined politics in right-wing youth organisations and is now a member of Brothers of Italy (FdI). In 2022 Mantovan was elected mayor of Porto Viro for the centre-right coalition with 54.6% of the vote. In 2024 she was appointed regional minister of Education, Formation, Labour and Equal Opportunities in Luca Zaia's third government, replacing party-mate Elena Donazzan (who had been elected to the European Parliament in the 2024 EP election), and, upon taking office, resigned from mayor.
