= Regional Council of Veneto =

Legislative organ of Veneto, Italy

Regional Council of Veneto Consiglio Regionale del Veneto
- 12th Legislature
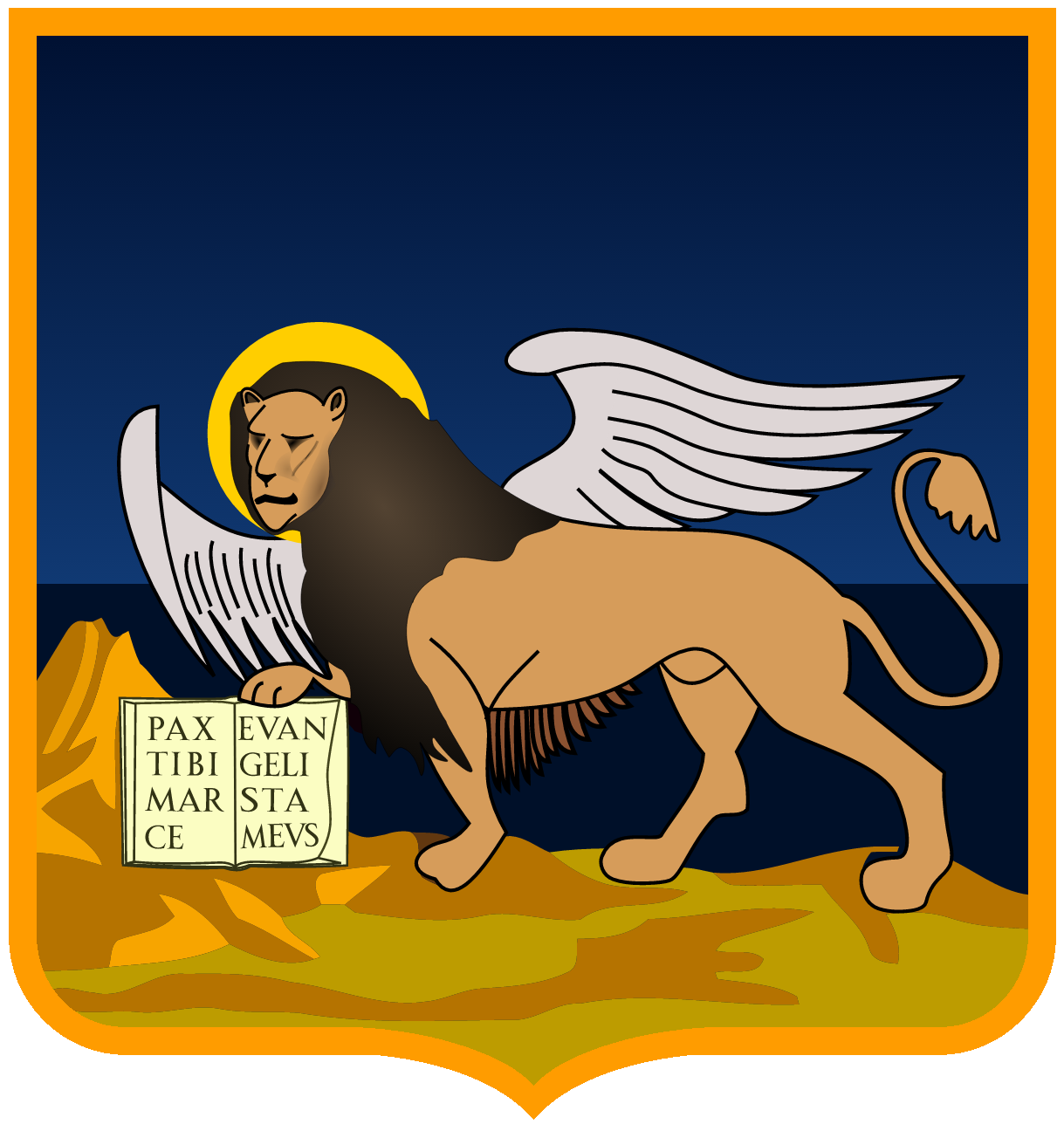

Type
- Type: Regional council Unicameral
- Established: 6 July 1970

Leadership
- President: Alberto Stefani, LV–Lega since 5 December 2025

Structure
- Seats: 51
- Political groups: Government (34): Lega–LV (19); FdI (9); FI (3); LVR (1); UDC (1); FN (1); Opposition (17): PD (10); RV (2); AVS (2); M5S (1); A (1); CV (1)
- Length of term: 5 years

Elections
- Voting system: Party-list semi-proportional representation with majority bonus D'Hondt method
- Last election: 23 November 2025

Meeting place
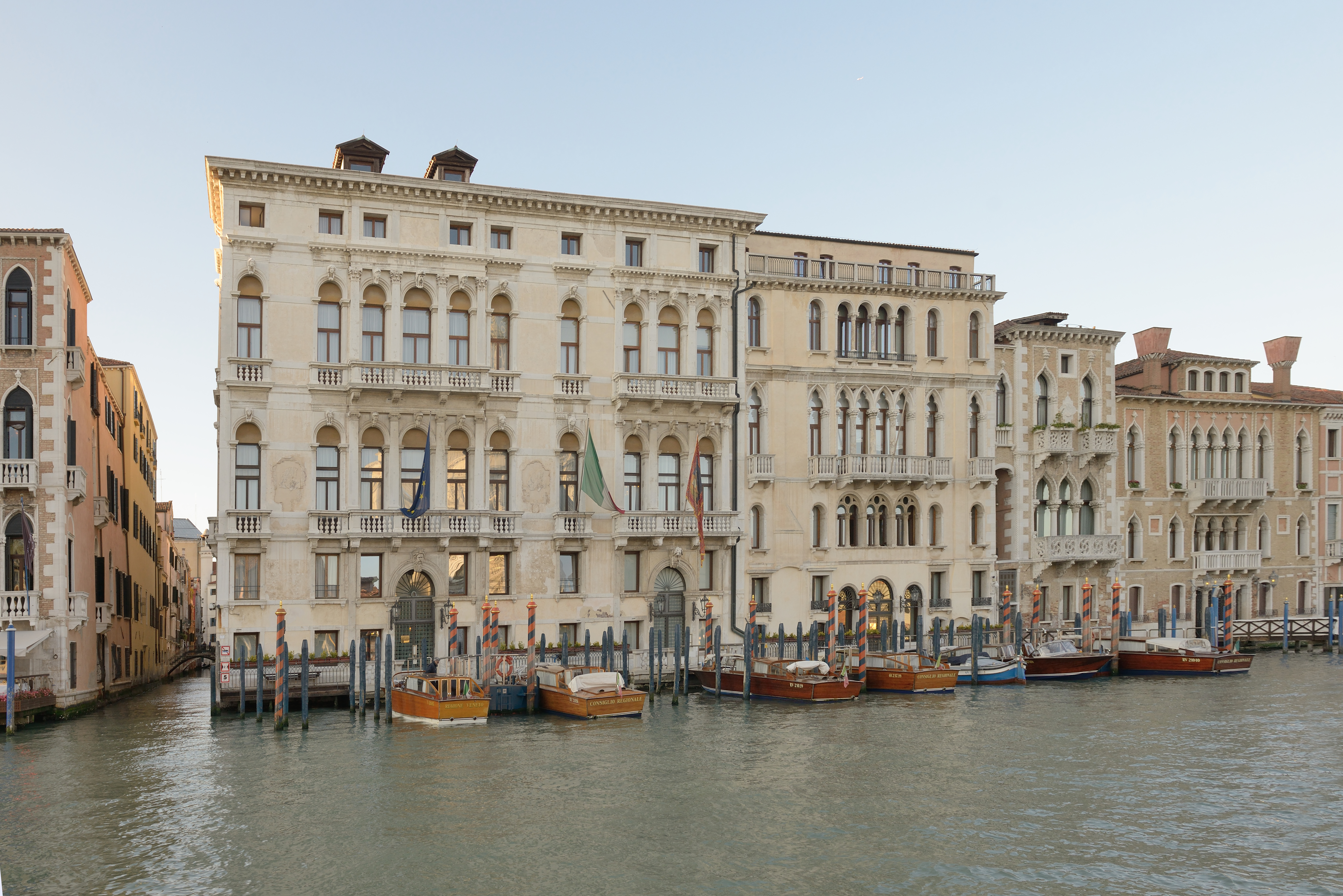
- Palazzo Ferro Fini, Venice

Website
- http://www.consiglioveneto.it

The Regional Council of Veneto (Italian: Consiglio Regionale del Veneto) is the legislative assembly of Veneto, Italy.

The council, which has its seat at Palazzo Ferro Fini, located along the Grand Canal in Venice. was first elected in 1970, when ordinary regions were established, twenty-two years after the Italian Constitution envisioned them in 1948.

== Composition ==
The Regional Council of Veneto (Consiglio Regionale del Veneto) is composed of 51 members. 49 councillors are elected in provincial constituencies by proportional representation using the largest remainder method with a Droop quota and open lists, while the remaining two are the elected President and the candidate for president who comes second. The winning coalition wins a bonus of seats in order to make sure the elected president has a majority in the council.

The council is elected for a five-year term, but, if the President suffers a vote of no confidence, resigns or dies, under the simul stabunt, simul cadent (literally they will stand together or they will fall together) clause introduced in the Italian Constitution in 1999 and later incorporate in the Statute of Veneto, also the council is dissolved and an early election is called.

=== Political Groups ===
==== Political parties ====
Party	Seats	Status
Lega–Liga Veneta (Lega–LV)	19 / 51	Government
Democratic Party (PD)	10 / 51	Opposition
Brothers of Italy (FdI)	9 / 51	Government
Forza Italia (FI)	3 / 51	Government
Resist Veneto (RV)	2 / 51	Opposition
Greens and Left Alliance (AVS)	2 / 51	Opposition
Five Star Movement (M5S)	1 / 51	Opposition
Venetian Reformists in Action	1 / 51	Opposition
Liga Veneta Repubblica (LVR)	1 / 51	Government
Union of the Centre (UdC)	1 / 51	Government
The Venetian Civic Lists (CV)	1 / 51	Opposition
National Future (FN)	1 / 51	Government

==== Coalitions ====
Party	Seats	Status
Centre-right coalition	34 / 51	Government
Centre-left coalition	15 / 51	Opposition
Resist Veneto	2 / 51	Opposition

Sources: Regional Council of Veneto – Groups and Regional Council of Veneto – Members

=== Historical composition ===
Election	DC	PCI/PDS (Note: The Democratic Party of the Left (PDS) succeeded the PCI in 1991)	PSI	PLI	PRI	PSDI	MSI	FdV (Note: Stood as the Federation of Green Lists in 1985, as a joint list with the Rainbow Greens in 1990 before merging into the Federation of the Greens (FdV))	Others	Total	Government	President
I - 1970	28	9	5	2	1	3	1	-	1	50	DC	Angelo Tomelleri (1970–1972, 1973–1975) Piero Feltrin (1972–1973)
II - 1975	31	14	8	1	1	3	2	-	-	60	DC–PRI (1975–1977) DC (1977–1980)	Angelo Tomelleri (1975–1980)
III - 1980	32	13	7	1	1	2	2	-	2	60	DC (1980–October 1981) DC–PSDI (October 1981–1985)	Carlo Bernini (1980–1985)
IV - 1985	30	12	8	1	2	1	2	1	4	60	DC–PSI–PSDI–PLI	Carlo Bernini (1985–1989) Gianfranco Cremonese (1989–1990)
V - 1990	27	10	8	1	1	1	1	4	7	60	DC–PSI–PRI–PSDI (1990–1992) DC–PSI–FdV (1992–1993) DC–PDS–PSI–FdV–UPV (1993–1994) PPI (Note: PPI succeeded the DC in 1994)–LV–PLI–FI–UPV–CPA–LP (Note: Successor of the Antiprohibitionists on Drugs electoral list) (1994–1995)	Gianfranco Cremonese (1990–1992) Franco Frigo (1992–1993) Giuseppe Pupillo (1993–1994) Aldo Bottin (1994–1995)

	Centre-left coalition			Centre-right coalition								
Election	PDS/DS/PD	FdV/Verdi (Note: FdV formed the European Greens – Green Italia alliance and stood as part of New Veneto in 2015. FdV then stood as part of the Green Europe list in 2020 before merging in 2021. Stood as part of Greens and Left Alliance in 2025.)	Total	LV–Lega (Note: Joined the centre-right coalition in 2000, seats in 1995 are not counted towards total centre-right seats.)	FI (Note: The original Forza Italia merged into The People of Freedom before dissolving in 2013, and Forza Italia being refounded in 2013.)	AN/FdI	CCD/UDC (Note: The CCD/UDC stood as part of a centrist coalition in 2010 and 2015)	Total	Others	Total	Government	President
VI - 1995	9	2	18	9	15	6	3	24	2	53	FI–AN–CDU (Note: The regional councillors of the CDU were elected from a joint list with FI.)–CCD	Giancarlo Galan
VII - 2000	8	1	22	6	17	5	1	31			FI–LV–AN–CDU–CCD	Giancarlo Galan
VIII - 2005	13 (Note: Ran as part of The Olive Tree)	1	18	7	12	4	3	27			FI–LV–AN–UDC–NPSI	Giancarlo Galan
IX - 2010	14	–	18	18	13 (Note: As The People of Freedom)	– (Note: The AN merged into The People of Freedom)	3	31			LV–PdL	Luca Zaia
X - 2015	8	0	11	10	3	1	1 (Note: As part of Popular Area)	28			LV–FI	Luca Zaia
XI - 2020	6	1	8	9	2	5	–	40			LV–FdI	Luca Zaia
XII - 2025	9	2	14	19	3	9	1	33			LV–FdI–FI	Alberto Stefani (2025–)

Election	Majority	Opposition	Council	President of the Region
23 April 1995	Centre-right (Pole for Freedoms) 36 / 65	Centre-left (The Olive Tree) 18 / 65 Lega Nord 9 / 65 PRC 2 / 65		Giancarlo Galan (1995–2010)
16 April 2000	Centre-right (House of Freedoms) 37 / 60	Centre-left (The Olive Tree) 23 / 60		Giancarlo Galan (1995–2010)
3 April 2005	Centre-right (House of Freedoms) 39 / 60	Centre-left (The Union) 19 / 60 PNE 2 / 60		Giancarlo Galan (1995–2010)
28 March 2010	Centre-right 37 / 60	Centre-left 19 / 60 UDC 4 / 60		Luca Zaia (2010–2025)
31 May 2015	Centre-right 29 / 51	Centre-left 12 / 51 M5S 5 / 51 F!–AP 5 / 51 |51		Luca Zaia (2010–2025)
20 September 2020	Centre-right 41 / 51	Centre-left 9 / 51 M5S 1 / 51		Luca Zaia (2010–2025)
23 November 2025	Centre-right 34 / 51	Centre-left 15 / 51 RV 2 / 51		Alberto Stefani (since 2025)

== Presidents ==
This is a list of the Presidents of the Regional Council (Italian: Presidenti del Consiglio regionale):

Name	Party	Period		Legislature
Vito Orcalli	DC	6 July 1970	12 November 1974	I (1970)
Giancarlo Gambaro	DC	12 November 1974	14 July 1975	I (1970)
Giancarlo Gambaro	DC	14 July 1975	19 September 1975	II (1975)
Bruno Marchetti	PSI	19 September 1975	14 July 1980	II (1975)
Bruno Marchetti	PSI	14 July 1980	17 June 1985	III (1980)
Carlo Bernini	DC	17 June 1985	29 July 1985	IV (1985)
Francesco Guidolin	DC	29 July 1985	11 June 1990	IV (1985)
Amalia Sartori	PSI	11 June 1990	30 July 1990	V (1990)
Umberto Carraro	PSI	30 July 1990	5 June 1995	V (1990)
Amalia Sartori	FI	5 June 1995	29 May 2000	VI (1995)
Enrico Cavaliere	LV–LN	29 May 2000	9 May 2005	VII (2000)
Marino Finozzi	LV–LN	9 May 2005	26 April 2010	VIII (2005)
Clodovaldo Ruffato	PdL	26 April 2010	26 June 2015	IX (2010)
Roberto Ciambetti	LV–LN	26 June 2015	15 October 2020	X (2015)
Roberto Ciambetti	LV–LN	15 October 2020	15 December 2025	XI (2020)
Luca Zaia	LV–Lega	15 December 2025	present	XII (2025)

Source: Regional Council of Veneto

== See also ==
- Members of the Regional Council of Veneto, 2020–2025
- Members of the Regional Council of Veneto, 2015–2020
- Members of the Regional Council of Veneto, 2010–2015
- Members of the Regional Council of Veneto, 2005–2010
- Regional council (Italy)
- Government of Veneto
- Politics of Veneto
