= Carlo Bernini =

Italian academic and politician (1936–2011)

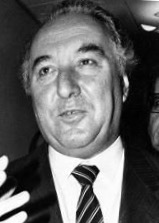

Minister of Transport
- In office July 1989 – 27 June 1992
- Prime Minister: Giulio Andreotti

Personal details
- Born: 6 May 1936 Bondeno
- Died: 1 January 2011 (aged 74) Castelfranco Veneto
- Party: Christian Democracy (1952–1994); Union of the Centre (2003–2008); The People of Freedom
- Spouse: Angela Bernini
- Children: 3

Carlo Bernini (6 May 1936 – 1 January 2011) was an Italian academic, politician and businessman. Being a member of the Christian Democracy (DC) he served at the Italian Senate between 1992 and 1994 and was the minister of transport in the period 1989–1992.

== Biography ==
Bernini was born in Bondeno, Ferrara, on 6 May 1936. In 1952 he joined the DC. He was a professor of transport economics and worked at the faculty of political science of the University of Padua. From 1971 to 1980 he was president of the Province of Treviso and president of the Veneto Region between 1980 and 1989.

In July 1989 he was appointed minister of transport to the sixth cabinet of Prime Minister Giulio Andreotti. He also held the same post in the Andreotti's seventh cabinet until 27 June 1992. Bernini was elected to the Italian Senate in 1992 and served there until 1994.

Following the dissolution of the DC in 1994 he retired from politics, but he joined the Union of the Centre in 2003 from which he resigned in 2008. Then he joined the People of Freedom. In 2004 Bernini founded a low cost airline company, MyAir, and headed it. The company went bankrupt in 2009.

Bernini was married to Angela Bernini and had three children. In Summer 2010 he was hospitalized following a heart attack and died in a retirement home in Castelfranco Veneto on the New Year's Day of 2011.
