= President of Veneto =

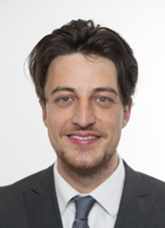
- Incumbent; Alberto Stefani since 5 December 2025
- Residence: Palazzo Balbi, Venice
- Term length: Five years, no term limits
- Inaugural holder: Angelo Tomelleri (1970)
- Formation: Italian Constitution
- Website: http://www.regione.veneto.it

The president of Veneto is the supreme authority of Veneto, a region of Italy.

== Election ==
Originally appointed by the Regional Council of Veneto, since 1995 de facto and 2000 de jure, the president is elected by popular vote every five years under universal suffrage: in regional elections the candidate who receives a plurality of votes is elected.

The office is connected to the Regional Council, which is elected contextually: one fifth of the assembly seats are generally reserved to his supporters, which are wholesale elected concurrently with the president. The Council and the president are linked by an alleged relationship of confidence: if the president resigns or he is dismissed by the Council, a snap election is called for both the legislative and the executive offices, because in no case the two bodies can be chosen separately.

== Powers ==
The president of Veneto promulgates regional laws and regulations. He can receive special administrative functions by the national government. The president is one of the eighty members of the Regional Council and, in this capacity, he can propose new laws.

The president appoints and dismiss the Regional Government (called Giunta Regionale in Italian). The Cabinet is composed by no more than eight regional assessors (assessori, regional ministers) who can be contextually members of the Council. One assessor can be appointed Vice President.

The Regional Government prepares the budget, appoints the boards of public regional agencies and companies, manages assets, develops projects of governance, and resorts to the Constitutional Court of Italy if it thinks that a national law may violate regional powers. The president and the Government are two different authorities of the Region: in matters within its competence, the Government has the power to vote to give its approval.

== Current government ==
The next government will be formed by Alberto Stefani within 10 days from his swearing in.

== See also ==
- List of presidents of Veneto
