= Alberto Stefani =

Italian politician (born 1992)

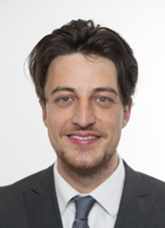

President of Veneto
- Incumbent
- Assumed office 5 December 2025
- Preceded by: Luca Zaia

Member of the Chamber of Deputies
- In office 23 March 2018 – 9 December 2025
- Constituency: Veneto 2

Mayor of Borgoricco
- In office 26 May 2019 – 10 June 2024
- Preceded by: Giovanni Novello
- Succeeded by: Gianluca Pedron

Personal details
- Born: 16 November 1992 (age 33) Camposampiero, Italy
- Party: Lega
- Education: University of Padua
- Profession: Legal advisor

Alberto Stefani (born 16 November 1992) is an Italian politician serving as President of Veneto since 2025. He was first elected in the 2018 general election, and was re-elected in 2022. From 2019 to 2024, he served as mayor of Borgoricco. Since 2023, he has served as secretary of Liga Veneta and federal vice-secretary since 2024.

== Biography ==
Stefani was born in Camposampiero, in the province of Padua. His paternal grandfather was a member of the Italian Communist Party, while the rest of the family was politically centre-right. A Catholic, he was a member of Azione Cattolica. He started with politics during secondary school at the Isaac Newton Scientific High School in Camposampiero, where he graduated with top marks in 2011, and joined the party at 17. In 2011 he became provincial coordinator in Padua for his party's youth movement and regional coordinator for the university movement. In 2017 he graduated in law from the University of Padua with honours, with a thesis in canon law and legal history titled L'adozione dello strumento codiciale nell'ordinamento canonico. He has authored academic publications in ecclesiastical and canon law.

=== Election to the Chamber ===
In the 2018 general election he stood for the Chamber of Deputies in the single-member constituency Veneto 2 – 03 (Vigonza), backed by the centre-right coalition, and was elected with 52.28% of the vote, ahead of the Five Star Movement candidate Alberto Artoni (24.98%) and the centre-left candidate Anna Zanetti (16.49%). In the XVIII legislature he served as secretary of the Committee for Legislation, chaired the opinions subcommittee and sat on the 1st Committee (Constitutional Affairs). He was first signatory of a bill to protect student family caregivers and filed parliamentary questions regarding cyberbullying and misogynistic chat groups on Telegram.

=== Mayor of Borgoricco ===
In the 2019 local elections in Veneto, he was elected mayor of Borgoricco with 51.41% of the vote, becoming one of the youngest mayors in Italy and the youngest to hold both mayoral and parliamentary office at the same time. On 27 November 2019 he joined the council of ANCI Veneto. During the COVID-19 emergency he promoted a “mayors’ cordon” to reopen hairdressers, beauty salons, bars and restaurants safely and to reactivate nursery services. He is a member of AUTISMO Onlus and co-authored a letter to the prime minister seeking time-slot access to equipped public parks for families with autistic children. He donated his entire mayoral allowance for the term to the municipal budget, and in the 8–9 June 2024 elections his civic list won 77% of the vote; as a council candidate he obtained the highest personal preference total in Veneto.

=== Liga Veneta and federal deputy secretary ===
After serving as commissioner of the Lega in Venice and briefly in Padua, on 23 December 2020 he was appointed regional commissioner for the party in Veneto by federal secretary Matteo Salvini. In the 2022 snap election he was re-elected in the single-member constituency Veneto 2 – 01 (Rovigo) with 60.56% of the vote; the main centre-left opponent, Alberto Lucchin, polled 20.76%. On 11 January 2024 he tabled a bill as first signatory to raise the cap on regional presidents’ terms from two to three, and he also promoted a proposal to restore the Provinces as first-level entities by repealing the Delrio law.

On 24 June 2023 he was elected secretary of Liga Veneta by the regional congress in Padua with 64% of delegates’ votes, becoming the youngest secretary in the organisation’s forty-year history. Since 1 August 2023 he has chaired the bicameral committee for implementing fiscal federalism. On 12 September 2024 he was appointed federal deputy secretary of the Lega; he is reported as the youngest person to hold the post.

=== Candidacy for President of the Veneto Region ===
On 8 October 2025 the centre-right coalition officially named Stefani as its candidate for the 2025 Venetian regional election. He was supported by Brothers of Italy, the Lega, Forza Italia and Us Moderates.

On 24 November 2025 Stefani won the election in a landslide and became the youngest ever President of Veneto.

== Electoral history ==
Election	House	Constituency	Party	Votes	Result
2018	Chamber of Deputies	Veneto 2 – Vigonza	Lega	100,714	Elected
2022	Chamber of Deputies	Veneto 2 – Rovigo	Lega	116,885	Elected
