= List of presidents of Veneto =

This is the list of presidents of Veneto since 1970.

President		Term of office		Party	Administration	Coalition	Legislature
President		Duration in years, months and days		Party	Administration	Coalition	Legislature
Presidents elected by the Regional Council (1970–1995)
1	Angelo Tomelleri (1924–1985)	1 August 1970	26 May 1972	DC	Tomelleri I	DC	I (1970)
1	Angelo Tomelleri (1924–1985)	1 year, 9 months and 26 days		DC	Tomelleri I	DC	I (1970)
2	Pietro Feltrin (1927–1982)	26 May 1972	13 March 1973	DC	Feltrin	DC	I (1970)
2	Pietro Feltrin (1927–1982)	9 months and 16 days		DC	Feltrin	DC	I (1970)
(1)	Angelo Tomelleri (1924–1985)	13 March 1973	3 August 1980	DC	Tomelleri II	DC	I (1970)
(1)	Angelo Tomelleri (1924–1985)	13 March 1973	3 August 1980	DC	Tomelleri III	DC • PRI	II (1975)
(1)	Angelo Tomelleri (1924–1985)	13 March 1973	3 August 1980	DC	Tomelleri IV	DC	II (1975)
(1)	Angelo Tomelleri (1924–1985)	7 years, 4 months and 22 days		DC	Tomelleri IV	DC	II (1975)
3	Carlo Bernini (1936–2011)	3 August 1980	9 August 1989	DC	Bernini I	DC • PSDI	III (1980)
3	Carlo Bernini (1936–2011)	3 August 1980	9 August 1989	DC	Bernini II	DC • PSI • PSDI • PLI	IV (1985)
3	Carlo Bernini (1936–2011)	9 years and 7 days		DC	Bernini II	DC • PSI • PSDI • PLI	IV (1985)
4	Gianfranco Cremonese (1940–2018)	9 August 1989	24 June 1992	DC	Cremonese I	DC • PSI • PSDI • PLI	IV (1985)
4	Gianfranco Cremonese (1940–2018)	9 August 1989	24 June 1992	DC	Cremonese II	DC • PSI • PSDI • PRI	V (1990)
4	Gianfranco Cremonese (1940–2018)	2 years, 10 months and 16 days		DC	Cremonese II	DC • PSI • PSDI • PRI	V (1990)
5	Franco Frigo (Born 1950)	10 November 1992	11 May 1993	DC	Frigo	DC • PSI • FdV	V (1990)
5	Franco Frigo (Born 1950)	6 months and 2 days		DC	Frigo	DC • PSI • FdV	V (1990)
6	Giuseppe Pupillo (Born 1940)	11 May 1993	26 May 1994	PDS	Pupillo	DC • PDS • PSI • FdV • UPV	V (1990)
6	Giuseppe Pupillo (Born 1940)	1 year and 16 days		PDS	Pupillo	DC • PDS • PSI • FdV • UPV	V (1990)
7	Aldo Bottin (Born 1938)	26 May 1994	26 May 1995	PPI	Bottin	PPI • LV • PLI • UPV	V (1990)
7	Aldo Bottin (Born 1938)	1 year and 1 day		PPI	Bottin	PPI • LV • PLI • UPV	V (1990)
Directly-elected presidents (since 1995)
8	Giancarlo Galan (Born 1956)	26 May 1995	10 April 2010	FI	Galan I	Pole for Freedoms (FI • AN • CDU • CCD)	VI (1995)
8	Giancarlo Galan (Born 1956)	26 May 1995	10 April 2010	FI	Galan II	House of Freedoms (FI • LV • AN • CDU • CCD)	VII (2000)
8	Giancarlo Galan (Born 1956)	26 May 1995	10 April 2010	FI	Galan III	House of Freedoms (FI • LV • AN • UDC)	VIII (2005)
8	Giancarlo Galan (Born 1956)	14 years, 10 months and 19 days		FI	Galan III	House of Freedoms (FI • LV • AN • UDC)	VIII (2005)
9	Luca Zaia (Born 1968)	10 April 2010	5 December 2025	LV	Zaia I	LV • PdL	IX (2010)
9	Luca Zaia (Born 1968)	10 April 2010	5 December 2025	LV	Zaia II	LV • FI	X (2015)
9	Luca Zaia (Born 1968)	10 April 2010	5 December 2025	LV	Zaia III	LV • FdI	XI (2020)
9	Luca Zaia (Born 1968)	15 years, 7 months and 23 days		LV	Zaia III	LV • FdI	XI (2020)
10	Alberto Stefani (Born 1992)	5 December 2025	Incumbent	LV	Stefani	LV • FdI • FI	XII (2025)
10	Alberto Stefani (Born 1992)	10 months and 5 days		LV	Stefani	LV • FdI • FI	XII (2025)

== See also ==
- President of the province (Italy)
