= Liga Veneta =

- Secretary: Andrea Tomaello (federal commissioner)
- Founded: 9 December 1979; 46 years ago
- Headquarters: Via Panà, 56; 35027 Noventa Padovana
- Ideology: Venetian nationalism
- National affiliation: Lega Nord (1991–2020); Lega per Salvini Premier (2020–present)
- Colours: Green Blue
- Regional Council: 19 / 51
- Chamber of Deputies (Veneto seats): 9 / 32
- Senate (Veneto seats): 4 / 16

Website
- www.ligaonline.it

Liga Veneta (Venetian: Łiga Vèneta; English: Venetian League, LV), whose complete name is Liga Veneta per Salvini Premier (English: Venetian League for Salvini Premier), is a regionalist political party active in Veneto, currently led by Andrea Tomaello as federal commissioner.

The LV, whose ideology combines Venetian nationalism and support for fiscal federalism, was established in 1979 under the slogan "farther from Rome, closer to Europe", and was the first party of its kind in northern Italy, predating Umberto Bossi's Lega Lombarda by five years. The LV was one of the founding "national" sections of Lega Nord (LN) in 1991 and has been the regional section of Lega per Salvini Premier (LSP) in Veneto since 2020. Despite its long alignment with Lega Nord and Lega, the LV has its ideological peculiarities and is seen as more centrist.

In the 2010 regional election the LV was by far the largest party in Veneto with 35.2% of the vote and LV's Luca Zaia, who was supported also by The People of Freedom, was elected President of Veneto with 60.2%. In the 2015 regional election the LV, which fielded also a "Zaia list" improved its tally to 40.9% and Zaia, who counted also on the support of some minor parties, was re-elected with 50.1%. In the 2020 regional election the LV's two lists improved again their tally to 61.5% and Zaia was re-elected by a landslide 76.8% of the vote. In the 2025 regional election coalition agreements barred Zaia's list from running, but the LV came again first with 36.3% of the vote, while Alberto Stefani was elected to succeed Zaia with 64.4%.

Among leading members, Gian Paolo Gobbo was the party's longest-serving secretary, Zaia represents its liberal and more progressive wing, while Lorenzo Fontana, from the conservative wing, has been the President of Italy's Chamber of Deputies since 2022.

== History ==
=== Background and foundation ===
The origins of Venetian identity and Venetian nationalism lie in the Republic of Venice or Venetian Republic, which lasted eleven centuries from 697 to 1797, being one of the first modern republics of the world. After Veneto's annexation by Italy in 1866 and especially right after World War I calls for Venetian autonomy came from both left and right of the political spectrum. Early Venetists included Guido Bergamo, a member of the Chamber of Deputies for the Italian Republican Party, and Italico Corradino Cappellotto, a member of the Chamber for the Italian People's Party who launched the first full-fledged Venetist party, Lion of Saint Mark, which obtained 6.1% of the vote in the province of Treviso in the 1921 general election.

Venetist ideas made a comeback in the 1960s, when the Venetian Regionalist Autonomous Movement (MARV) campaigned for the institution of the ordinary regions (including Veneto), prefigured by the Constitution of Italy. The ordinary regions were finally instituted in 1970. Since then, Veneto experienced a dramatic economic boom due to a new production model based on small enterprises. The high burden of taxes and bureaucracy, associated with the increasing frustration with the inefficient and overstaffed Italian government in Rome, that continued to channel northern taxes as massive development aid to the corrupt and backward southern regions, was the key element, along with linguistic and historical claims, that led to the formation of Liga Veneta.

Liga Veneta was promoted in 1978 by Franco Rocchetta, a Venetian philologist and president of the Venetian Philological Society who had been talking of a "Venetian league" since 1968. The party constitution, modelled on those of the Valdostan Union and the Radical Party, was officially signed by 14 founding members on 16 January 1980 in Padua and Achille Tramarin was elected national secretary. In December 1979, during the party's first informal congress, named "farther from Rome, closer to Europe", the opening speech recited: "Today for Venetians the moment has come, after 113 years of Italian unitary colonisation, to take their natural and human resources back, to fight against the wild exploitation that has brought emigration, pollution, and rooting out from their culture". European integration through the European Union (EU) was seen as an opportunity to give back to Veneto its autonomy.

=== Early years and splits (1980–1989) ===
In the 1983 general election the LV gained 4.3% in Veneto: Tramarin was elected to the Chamber of Deputies and Graziano Girardi to the Senate. In the Pedemontana, the area of the Padanian-Venetian Plain at the feet of the Venetian Prealps, the LV became the second largest party after then-dominant Christian Democracy (DC). This party would be mostly damaged from the rise of the LV as both parties concurred for the support of the middle class. DC regional leader Antonio Bisaglia had proposed a regional party modelled on the Christian Social Union in Bavaria, but opposition from Rome and his sudden death stopped the plan. However, a few months later, a power struggle took place within the LV and the winner was Rocchetta, who had been behind the scenes up to that moment, but was disappointed for his missed election. Tramarin was replaced as national secretary by Marilena Marin, Rocchetta's future wife, and, expelled by Marin, would form the splinter Liga Veneta Serenissima (LVS) in 1984. In the 1984 European Parliament election the LV gained 3.3% in Veneto, not enough to win any seats.

In the 1985 regional election the party obtained 3.7% and two regional councillors: Ettore Beggiato and Rocchetta. Tramarin's LVS won a mere 0.2% of the vote and, since then, Rocchetta and Marin have had the party in their hands. That of the LVS was only one of several splits occurred over the decade. The first had been Giulio Pizzati's Liga Federativa Veneta in 1983, while another occurred in 1987: some hardliners, led by Luigi Faccia and Flavio Contin, left the party and launched the Venetian Most Serene Government, which would organise the St Mark's Campanile's "assault" in 1997 (see Venetian nationalism). However, the two most damaging splits were those of the Union of the Venetian People (UPV), formed by Beggiato (who was joined by Tramarin and Girardi) and that of the Veneto Autonomous Region Movement (MVRA). After the splits, the only counterweight to Rocchetta–Marin within the LV was thus represented by the Treviso wing, which then started to gain influence, under the leadership of Gian Paolo Gobbo and Mauro Michielon. In the next elections, the LV and the UPV had similar showings.

=== Foundation of Lega Nord (1989–1994) ===
Rocchetta and Marin managed to forge an alliance with Umberto Bossi's Lega Lombarda (LL) for the 1989 European Parliament election, Lega Lombarda – Alleanza Nord, in which the LV won a mere 1.7% of the vote and no seats. In 1989–1990, ahead of the 1990 regional elections, the LV took part in the process of federating the northern regionalist parties, including the LL, Autonomist Piedmont, Ligurian Union, Emilia-Romagna League and Tuscan Alliance. In the 1990 regional election the LV and the UPV scored 5.9% and 1.9%, respectively. In the 1991 local elections, the UPV surpassed the LV. Some attempts to merge the two parties into one failed, but from that point, thanks to the alliance with Bossi, LV's rise would be unstoppable.

In February 1991, the LV finally was merged with the five parties of the LL–AN alliance and newly-formed parties in the northern autonomous regions and provinces (the future Lega Vallée d'Aoste, Lega Alto Adige Südtirol, Lega Trentino, Lega Friuli and Lega Trieste) into Lega Nord (LN). Since then, the LV has been the "national" section of the LN in Veneto. Bossi was elected federal secretary and Rocchetta federal president. Thanks to the federal structure of the LN and to its ideology (according to which Padania is a country formed of different nations: Veneto, Lombardy, Piedmont, etc.), the LV retained much of its autonomy, but occasionally tensions occurred with "the Lombards", causing splits.

In the 1992 general election, the LN scored 8.7% throughout Italy and the LV won 17.8% of the vote in Veneto and was second only to the DC, returning to the Chamber and the Senate after five years, this time with several elects. The UPV and the MVRA both won 1.5% of the vote, while Lega Autonomia Veneta (LAV), formed by the former Socialist mayor of Venice Mario Rigo, got 4.7% of the vote. The Venetist movement, divided as ever, however gained the support of about a quarter of Venetian voters.

=== Heyday and further splits (1994–1998) ===
In the 1994 general election the LV won 21.6% of the vote in Veneto (the LAV took 3.2%) and three of its members joined the first Berlusconi government: Rocchetta was undersecretary of Foreign Affairs, Mariella Mazzetto of Education and Giovanni Meo Zilio (a former Socialist partisan in the Italian resistance movement), of University and Research. Between 1994 and 1995 the LV was also part of the regional government for the first time, with Gian Paolo Gobbo as vice president.

In July 1994 Marin was replaced by Fabrizio Comencini as national secretary of the party, while Gobbo was elected national president. Shortly after, in September, Rocchetta and Marin left the party in disagreement with Bossi and the new Venetian leadership, founding "Liga Nathion Veneta" (LNV). Rocchetta was replaced by Stefano Stefani, a leading member of the LV, as federal president of Lega Nord in February 1995. The exit of Rocchetta and Marin made possible the comeback of Beggiato into the party. Thanks to this the LV did not suffer a major setback in the 1995 regional election: 17.4% and 9 regional councillors elected. In the meantime, the LNV quickly disappeared and Rocchetta briefly joined other parties.

In the 1996 general election Bossi led Lega Nord to its strongest showing in a general election: with 10.1% of the vote, the party, which fielded lists only in northern Italy, became the fourth largest of the country. Comencini's Liga Veneta was the strongest national section of the League: it gained 29.3% of the vote in Veneto, 19 deputies and 9 senators, mostly elected in single-seat constituencies, in which the party, favoured by split-ticket voting, gained a total 32.8% of the vote.

The party had become strong also in local politics. In 1994 the party had won the mayorship of Treviso with Giancarlo Gentilini, and one year later it gained control of three provinces: Padua with Renzo Sacco, Verona with Antonio Borghesi and Treviso with Giovanni Mazzonetto. In 1997 the party won also in the province of Vicenza with Manuela Dal Lago, while Luca Zaia was elected President of the Province of Treviso, replacing Mazzonetto, in 1998. Also in 1998, Gentilini was re-elected mayor of Treviso.

In 1998 Comencini left the party over disagreements with Bossi and formed a brand-new Venetist party named Liga Veneta Repubblica (later named Veneti d'Europa, Liga Fronte Veneto and finally Liga Veneta Repubblica again). Seven regional councillors out of nine followed Comencini into the new party, while Gobbo took over as national secretary of the LV, along with a new national president, Giuseppe Ceccato (who left the party in 1999). In the 1999 provincial elections the party lost the provinces of Padua and Verona.

=== Decline and resurgence (1998–2006) ===
In 2000 the party joined at the regional level (as Lega Nord did countrywide) the centre-right coalition, whose main member parties were the centre-right Forza Italia (FI) and the right-wing National Alliance (AN). In the 2000 regional election the party took 12.0% of the vote, thus recovering form the 1998 schism (the combined score of Veneti d'Europa and Fronte Marco Polo, another offshoot, was 3.7%). After the election, the party joined the second government led by Giancarlo Galan of FI.

In the 2001 general election the LV won a mere 10.2% in Veneto, with 9 deputies and 4 senators elected, all in single-seat constituencies, thanks to the alliance with FI within the House of Freedoms coalition. After the election, Dozzo and Stefani joined the second Berlusconi government as undersecretaries of Agriculture and Industry, respectively.

In the 2002 provincial elections the party won for the second time in a row in Vicenza and Treviso. The province of Treviso confirmed itself as the most-leghista province of Italy and Zaia was re-elected Provincial President with more than 40% in the first round and with almost 70% in the run-off, with the party standing alone. Also in 2002 LV's Luciano Gasperini was elected federal president of Lega Nord. In a party congress in Vicenza, Gobbo was re-elected national secretary and Dal Lago was elected national president. In 2003 Gobbo was also elected mayor of Treviso.

In the 2005 regional election the LV gained 14.7% of the vote, despite the presence of other two Venetist parties (North-East Project and Liga Fronte Veneto, 5.4% and 1.2% respectively), and was decisive for Galan's third victory. After the election, the LV joined the third Galan government, with Zaia Vice President of the Region and minister of Agriculture and Tosi minister of Health.

In the 2006 general election however, the party scored 11.1% and got elected 5 deputies and 3 senators. It was the worst result in terms of elected members in the Italian Parliament since 1987, due to the narrow victory of the centre-left coalition led by Romano Prodi, winning the majority-premium for the Chamber of Deputies, and to the presence of North-East Project (2.7%) and of Liga Fronte Veneto (0.7%). In a provincial election later that year Leonardo Muraro, who had succeeded to Zaia, was elected President of the Province of Treviso and the LV scored 29.2% (combined result of party list, 15.6%, and Zaia's personal list, 13.6%), despite a good result by the rival North-East Project (11.6%).

=== Road to the leadership of Veneto (2006–2010) ===
In 2007 Tosi was elected mayor of Verona by a landslide (60.8% against the 33.9% of incumbent Paolo Zanotto), while in the provincial election of Vicenza Attilio Schneck succeeded to Dal Lago as President (60.0%, largely ahead of her main challenger, Pietro Collareda, who stopped at 17.2%). Both Tosi, who was the second leghista to become mayor of a big city after Marco Formentini in Milan between 1993 and 1997, and Schneck were supported by the House of Freedoms coalition, but the LV had a good result in both races: in Vicenza it garnered 19.0% of the vote, while in Verona came first with 28.4% (combined score of party list, 12.0%, and Tosi's personal list, 16.4%). In June 2007, Tosi was replaced as regional minister by Francesca Martini.

In the 2008 general election the LV won a surprising 27.1% in Veneto, its best result since the 1996 general election, getting 16 deputies and 7 senators elected. Meanwhile, Gobbo was re-elected mayor of Treviso with 50.4% of the vote, twice the score of his main opponent. The combined result of the LV and Giancarlo Gentilini's personal list was 35.4%. Subsequently, Zaia became minister of Agriculture and Martini undersecretary of Health in the fourth Berlusconi government, while Federico Bricolo became floor leader of Lega Nord in the Senate. Zaia and Martini were thus replaced in the regional government by Franco Manzato and Sandro Sandri, respectively.

In July 2008 the party held its national congress in Padua. Gobbo was re-elected for the fourth time national secretary, while Tosi replaced Dal Lago as national president. Tosi appeared to be also the standard-bearer of the party in view of the 2010 regional election, along with Zaia.

In the 2009 European Parliament election the LV confirmed its strength, by gaining 28.4% and three MEPs: Lorenzo Fontana, a rising star from Verona, Giancarlo Scottà and Mara Bizzotto. The party also won two more provinces, Venice, then a stronghold of the left, with Francesca Zaccariotto, and Belluno with Gianpaolo Bottacin.

=== 2010 regional election and aftermath (2010–2012) ===
In December 2009 The People of Freedom (PdL), formed by the merger of FI and AN, determined that the coalition candidate in the 2010 regional election would be a leghista. Subsequently, the national council of Liga Veneta nominated Zaia for president. Tosi, who, as party president, presided the council, tried to be himself the candidate, and others proposed instead Manzato. However, Zaia had a broader support than Tosi and was unanimously chosen by the council.

In the election Zaia was elected President of Veneto by a landslide, with 60.2% of the vote against 29.1% of his foremost opponent, Giuseppe Bortolussi of the centre-left coalition centred around the new Democratic Party (PD). The election was a triumph for the LV, which was by far the largest party in the region with 35.2% of the vote, up from 14.7% of five years before, and got 20 seats in the Regional Council, up from 11. Zaia was also the most voted President of Veneto since direct elections were introduced in 1995. After the election, Zaia appointed an executive comprising six party members, a majority of whom were tosiani: Roberto Ciambetti (Budget and Local Government), Luca Coletto (Health), Maurizio Conte (Environment), Marino Finozzi (Tourism and International Trade), Franco Manzato (Agriculture) and Daniele Stival (Venetian Identity and Civil Protection).

In the 2011 provincial election of Treviso Muraro was easily re-elected President. The LV won 40.8% of the vote (combined result of party list, 29.6%, and Muraro's personal list, 11.4%), which was an 11.6% gain since the previous provincial election in 2006, but also a 7.7% loss from the 2010 regional election.

In late 2011, after the fall of the fourth Berlusconi government, Lega Nord abandoned the alliance with the PdL. Perceiving that the party was entering a crisis, Giuseppe Covre (a former mayor of Oderzo and MP) and Marzio Favero (mayor of Montebelluna and philosopher) proposed a "Manifesto for the League which will be". In its call for a "cultural revolution" and for a bottom-up restructuring of the party, the document was interpreted as a call for a new leadership, both at national and federal level.

All throughout 2011 the faction around Tosi, close to Roberto Maroni at the federal level, won most provincial congresses in Veneto, including that of Treviso.

=== Party's renewal and reform (2012–2015) ===
In April 2012 a corruption scandal hit the "magic circle" around Bossi, who resigned from federal secretary of Lega Nord after 21 years. This had consequences also in Veneto: a national congress was scheduled for 2–3 June 2012 and, after 14 years, Gobbo decided to step down from secretary. Tosi, just re-elected mayor of Verona with 57.4% of the vote (three times his closest opponent Michele Bertucco, who got a mere 22.8%), started his bid for the party's national leadership. Massimo Bitonci, a darling of Venetists and long-time rival of Tosi, was chosen as joint candidate by Venetists and Gobbo's loyalists. On 3 June 2012 Tosi was elected secretary with 57% of the vote (236 delegates out of 414), while Bitonci had 43% (178 delegates). On 9 June the LV's national council elected Luca Baggio, an ally of Tosi, as national president. Zaia warned Tosi that if he were not to be a unifying leader a split might occur.

In July 2012 Maroni was elected federal secretary, without challengers, during a federal congress presided by Zaia. The Venetian delegates elected also four members to the federal council: Finozzi (tosiano), Bitonci (anti-Tosi), Stival (tosiano) and Dal Lago (independent). A few days later Maroni appointed Federico Caner, who was supported by both Tosi and Gobbo, as federal deputy secretary. As early as in May 2013 Caner was replaced by Tosi, who dominated the party, despite internal opposition

At the 2013 general election the LV stopped at 10.5%, almost a record low, resulting in just 5 deputies and 5 senators. Tosi considered this a consequence of the renewed alliance with the PdL (instrumental to Maroni's election as President of Lombardy), while many party bigwigs, including Zaia, criticised his leadership, management of the campaign and selection of candidates. Most provincial leaders resigned or were deposed by Tosi, who appointed loyalists. In April the LV's national council, instructed by Tosi, expelled 35 party members (mostly Venetists or old-guard bossiani), including two regional councillors and a former deputy. In August a group of dissidents, led by Corrado Callegari, a former deputy, formed Veneto First, which became a separate party in January 2014 and welcomed a third councillor in February 2015.

In the 2013 municipal elections the party lost the mayorship of Treviso after 19 years, as Giancarlo Gentilini, who had been mayor from 1994 to 2003, before Gobbo, surrendered to Democrat Giovanni Manildo 55.5% to 44.5%. However, one year later, in the 2014 municipal elections Bitonci was elected mayor of the much bigger city of Padua, a Democratic stronghold, by defeating the incumbent Ivo Rossi 53.5% to 46.5%. The party thus governed two of the three largest cities of Veneto, Verona and Padua. Finally, in the 2014 European Parliament election the LV gained 15.2% and two MEPs, Tosi (who showed his electoral strength, but was soon replaced by then loyalist Lorenzo Fontana) and Mara Bizzotto.

=== Road to the 2015 regional election ===
In the run-up of the 2015 regional election the party was quite divided on alliances and strategies. Zaia wanted to continue the alliance with the new Forza Italia and the New Centre-Right (the two parties emerged from the break-up of the PdL) and to reinforce it with the creation of a "Zaia List", Tosi wanted the party to run with the sole support of the "Zaia List" and a "Tosi List", while Matteo Salvini, who succeeded to Maroni as federal secretary in 2013, kept an open mind only on Forza Italia and opposed, along with Zaia, any notion of a "Tosi List". Furthermore, while Zaia, supported by Salvini, wanted to renovate the party's group in the Regional Council (in order to get rid of some of his ministers who happened to be tosiani) and have a final say on the compilation of the party's slates, Tosi, who defended the position of long-time regional councillors and ministers, claimed his authority and the autonomy of the LV in relation to the federal party.

In March the struggle between Tosi and Zaia–Salvini led the former to threaten a run in competition with Zaia in the regional election and Lega Nord's federal council to appoint Dozzo as a mediator between the two contenders. The internal clashes led three regional councillors to quit the party in the Regional Council: Vittorino Cenci joined Veneto First, while LV's president Baggio and Matteo Toscani launched the pro-Tosi "Venetian Commitment". All three disagreed with a perceived party's rightward shift under Salvini, who had exchanged positionment with Tosi, while Cenci contested also Tosi and the party's engagement in southern politics through Us with Salvini (NcS). Subsequently, Salvini ejected Tosi on the grounds that the latter had refused to ditch his think tank, named "Let's Rebuild the Country", and appointed Dozzo commissioner for the LV. Consequently, Tosi decided to run for President against Zaia. Besides Baggio and Toscani, four more regional councillors — regional minister Daniele Stival and Giuseppe Stoppato, who formed, along with former Democrat Diego Bottacin, a group named "Toward North–Venetian People", regional minister Maurizio Conte and Andrea Bassi), three deputies, three senators and the President of the Province of Treviso Leonardo Muraro followed Tosi, while regional minister Finozzi and Mara Bizzotto MEP, chose not to. In the meantime, Venetian Commitment changed its name into "Tosi List for Veneto" (LTV).

=== 2015 regional election ===
The 2015 regional election was a triumph for Zaia, who was re-elected with 50.1% of the vote, and Liga Veneta, which obtained 40.9% of the vote (combined result of official party list, 17.8%, and Zaia's personal list, 23.1%). Tosi and the two lists connected to the LTV won 11.9% and 7.1%, respectively, while other regionalist parties (Independence We Veneto, Venetian Independence, North-East Union, Autonomous Veneto Project and Veneto Confederal State) gained another 6.3% in what was the best result ever for both Venetist parties, which controlled the majority of the Regional Council for the first time, and Liga Veneta itself, which obtained 24 seats out of 51 in it.

After the election, Zaia unveiled his second government, composed of ten ministers, including nine lighisti: Gianluca Forcolin (Vice President, Budget and Local Government), Luca Coletto (Health and Social Programs), Roberto Marcato (Economic Development and Energy), Elisa De Berti (Publick Works, Infrastructures and Transports), Giuseppe Pan (Agriculture, Hunting and Fishing), Manuela Lanzarin (Social Affairs), Federico Caner (EU Programs, Tourism and International Trade), Gianpaolo Bottacin (Environment and Civil Protection) and Cristiano Corazzari (Culture, City Planning and Security); Elena Donazzan (Education and Labour), a former AN member, represented FI.

=== Transition years (2016–2020) ===
In February 2016, during a national congress, Gianantonio Da Re, a long-time lighista from the province of Treviso, affiliate of Gobbo and now close to Zaia, was elected national secretary. Da Re's election represented a return to normality after the traumatic leadership and ousting of Tosi. Subsequently, Bitonci was appointed national president by the party's national council and, contextually, Fontana was appointed deputy federal secretary by Salvini.

After Salvini's re-election as LN federal secretary in the 2017 leadership election (with overwhelming support from Venetians, still grateful for Tosi's ousting), at the party's federal congress on 21 May 2017 three LV members (Fontana, Marcato and Erik Umberto Pretto) were elected to the federal council.

In the 2018 general election the party obtained 32.2% of the vote, its best result ever in a general election, and, under a new electoral law that had re-introduced single-seat constituencies, had 23 deputies (including Bitonci, who had been defeated in the early 2017 municipal election in Padua) and 9 senators elected. After months of negotiations, the LN formed a coalition government with the Five Star Movement (M5S), under Prime Minister Giuseppe Conte. Two LV members were appointed ministers in the government: Erika Stefani at Regional Affairs and Autonomies, and Lorenzo Fontana at Family and Disability. In the 2019 European Parliament election the party reached 49.9% of the vote.

Following the formation of Lega per Salvini Premier and the 2019 federal congress of the LN, after which the latter became practically inactive, in February 2020 the LV was re-established as Liga Veneta per Salvini Premier in order to become the regional section of the new party. The founding members of the new LV were Zaia, Fontana, Marcato, Bitonci, Erika Stefani and Nicola Finco. In November Fontana, who had been commissioner for the party since Da Re's election to the European Parliament in 2019, was replaced by 28-year-old Alberto Stefani.

=== 2020 regional election ===
The regional election, held in September 2025, was, even more, a triumph for Zaia, who was re-elected for a third conservative term with 76.8% of the vote. Liga Veneta fielded three lists, including the official one, Zaia's personal list and the "Venetian Autonomy List" (comprising also Liga Veneta Repubblica), which obtained 16.9%, 44.6% and 2.4%, respectively. The party, with 33 seats (plus one obtained by the third list), had thus far more than 50% of the seats in the Regional Council.

After the election, Zaia unveiled his third government, composed of eight ministers, including seven lighisti: Elisa De Berti (Vice President, Legal Affairs, Public Works, Infrastructures and Transports), Francesco Calzavara (Planning, Budget, Patrimony and Local Government), Manuela Lanzarin (Health, Social Affairs and Social Programs), Roberto Marcato (Economic Development, Energy and Special Status for Venice), Federico Caner (EU Programs, Agriculture, Tourism and International Trade), Gianpaolo Bottacin (Environment, Climate and Civil Protection), Cristiano Corazzari (Culture, City Planning, Security, Hunting and Fishing); Elena Donazzan (Education, Formation, Labour and Equal Opportunities), representing Brothers of Italy (FdI). Due to the party's dominance, Roberto Ciambetti was re-elected President of the Regional Council and Nicola Finco was elected as one of his two vice presidents.

=== Re-organisation and discontents (2020–2025) ===
Despite the LV's strong showing in the regional election, the federal party had been suffering a decline in popular support since Salvini's decision to leave the Italian government in August 2019 and its replacement with a centre-left second Conte government. The 2022 general election was dominated by FdI, as happened countrywide, and the LV was reduced to 14.5% of the vote (–17.7pp from 2018), fueling internal conflicts and, especially, clashes between the federal party and the regional base. Despite its electoral losses, Lega joined the Meloni government and was rewarded with the presidency of the Chamber of Deputies, which was given to Lorenzo Fontana.

In the run-up of the regional congress, to be held in June 2023, Roberto Marcato led the challenge of the party's traditional wing. However, Marcato retired from the race when Franco Manzato, a centrist figure representing mainly the party's old guard from the province of Treviso, emerged as an alternative opposition candidate. At the congress, outgoing federal commissioner Alberto Stefani, a loyalist of Salvini, was thus elected secretary with 64.3% of the vote against Manzato's 35.7%, possibly with Zaia's silent support. The congress' result did not silence internal critics, like regional minister Federico Caner and MEP Gianantonio Da Re, who opposed Salvini's focus on southern Italy and his perceived Euroscepticism. Additionally, Caner, along with his colleagues Gianpaolo Bottacin and Roberto Marcato, did not go on stage at the rally of Pontida. In the meantime, former leader Flavio Tosi, who had merged his Tosi List for Veneto into FI in June 2022 and had become that party's regional coordinator in March 2023, started wooing disgruntled LV members into his new party: most notably, splinters have included former Vice President of Veneto Gianluca Forcolin, former senator Gianpaolo Vallardi and regional councillor Fabrizio Boron. In March 2024 Da Re was expelled from the party, of which he had been a member for 42 years, after having frequently criticised Salvini and finally offended him. In the 2024 European Parliament election the party was reduced to 13.2%.

At the congress of the federal party, held in Florence in April 2025, four Venetians were elected to the federal council, the party's governing board including 22 elective members: Mara Bizzotto and Giuseppe Canova representing the party's majority, and former leader Gian Paolo Gobbo e Erik Umberto Pretto representing the minority.

=== 2025 regional election ===
In the run-up of the 2025 regional election Lega long tried to change the law in order to allow term-limited Zaia to run again, as well as fielding Zaia's personal list, under which most of the party's regional councillors had been elected in 2020, but FdI and FI did not agree. However, the party was successful in obtaining the nomination of Alberto Stefani as the coalition's joint candidate for President of Veneto. Unable to run again for the top job, Zaia announced that he would lead the party in all seven provinces.

In the election, Stefani was elected President by a landslide 64.4% of the vote, with his main rival Giovanni Manildo and Riccardo Szumski obtaining 28.9% and 5.1%, respectively. The LV was confirmed the largest in the region with 36.3% of the vote, outperforming the Brothers of Italy (18.7%) against all odds, while the combined score of Venetian nationalist and/or regional parties was 45.0%, notably including 5.0% for Resist Veneto and 1.8% for Liga Veneta Repubblica. Zaia obtained 203,054 (write-in) preferences, the all-time record in Italian regional elections.

After the election, Zaia was elected President of the Council. The LV is also seeking to take control of most committees, by appointing term-limited former regional ministers as chairs. On the other side, Stefani, who had always confirmed that he would respect the pre-electoral pact on the balance of power between the parties of the coalition within the regional government, appointed a cabinet composed of five ministers representing the Brothers of Italy, three the LV plus one non-party independent appointed on the party's behalf, and one Forza Italia. The three ministers from the LV were Massimo Bitonci – who had resigned from Meloni government – at Economic Development, Research & Innovation and Investment Attraction, Marco Zecchinato at Interregional Cooperation, Territorial Governance, Infrastructure, Local Government and Territorial Reorganisation, and Paola Roma at Social Services, Family, Longevity, Sports and Housing.

During 2026 the party secured two more provincial presidents, other than Marco Donadel in Treviso (held since 1995), Flavio Pasini in Verona (since 2018) and Enrico Ferrarese in Rovigo (since 2021): in March Marco Staunovo Polacco was elected president in Belluno, while in September Daniele Canella, a loyalist of Marcato, succeeded to centre-left independent Sergio Giordani in Padua, with the support of all parties, especially the PD, while he had originally lost his party's nomination. Thus, five provinces in seven were led by party members.

== Ideology ==
=== Background ===
Liga Veneta was conceived by Franco Rocchetta and others in the late 1970s. During its first official meeting in Recoaro on 9 December 1979, Achille Tramarin, who was then elected secretary, gave a speech titled Venetian autonomy and Europe: "Today for Venetians the moment has come, after 113 years of Italian unitary colonisation, to take their natural and human resources back, to fight against the wild exploitation that brought poverty, emigration, pollution and uprooting from their culture". European integration was seen as an opportunity to give Veneto its autonomy back.

Rocchetta, who left the party in 1994 after a power struggle and has since become a bitter critic of his former colleagues in the name of pure Venetian nationalism, conceived the LV as a libertarian, secular and Europeanist party. The promotion the re-discovery the Republic of Venice's heritage, traditions, culture, and especially Venetian language, and opposition to the displacement of Mafia inmates in Veneto were key goals of the party since its foundation.

The LV is aimed to unite all Venetians who support autonomy for Veneto and federal reform. For this reason, it tends to be a multi-ideological catch-all party, following what Umberto Bossi stated in 1982 to his early followers of Lega Lombarda: "It does not matter how old are you, what your job is and what your political tendency: what matters is that you and we are all Lombard. [...] It is as Lombards that, indeed, that we have a fundamental common goal in that face of which our division in parties should fall behind". While the bulk of the original Lega Lombarda (including Bossi, Roberto Maroni and Marco Formentini) came from the left (Bossi and Maroni were previously active in the Italian Communist Party, Proletarian Democracy and the Greens) and envisioned a centre-left (to some extent social-democratic) party, the LV was characterized more as a liberal and centrist party and has always proposed a more libertarian political line.

This difference reflected also its position in Venetian politics: while, in the early 1990s, the League stole votes especially from the Communists and the Italian Socialist Party, in Veneto the LV basically replaced Christian Democracy as dominant political force. In fact, even though most of the early members of the party came from the centre-right (Christian Democracy and the Italian Liberal Party), there were also people coming from the left such as Giovanni Meo Zilio, Actionist and Socialist partisan in the Italian resistance movement, who was one of the founding fathers of the party, and Rocchetta himself, a former Republican and, later, Communist.

=== 2010–2015 platform ===
In the run-up to the 2010 regional election, the party released its political platform for the 2010–2015 term.

Its keywords were "innovation" and "modernity". The challenges that Veneto should face in the next decades, said the party, were to enhance "internationalization" in the era of globalization, to overcome the traditional Venetian polycentrism and interpret Veneto as a united and cohesive region: a "European region in Italian land". The program stressed also concepts such as "Europe of the regions", "Europe of citizens", "global Veneto", "openeness toward the world", "green economy", "urban planning" in respect of the environment, "respect for diversity" and "integration" of immigrants, along with the more traditional "think globally, act locally". Along these, the core issues of the party, especially autonomism, low taxes, fight against red tape and promotion of Venetian language and culture, were also included in the program. According to the paper, a strong Veneto as that imagined by the party would be a protagonist of federal reform in Italy and Europe.

The LV has opposed nuclear power plants in Veneto, citing the high population density and the fact that the region is already energetically self-sufficient.

=== Manifesto for a new League ===
In April 2012 some key members from the province of Treviso, led by Giuseppe Covre and Marzio Favero, proposed a "Manifesto for the League which will be", which was soon endorsed by Roberto Maroni (see above). The text, divided into eighteen points, was aimed at preparing a new course for the party. The proponents wanted to re-launch the federalist structure of Lega Nord, in spite of the centralisation and leadership which had long characterized it. Thus, they highlighted the centrality of members, internal democracy, open debate and frequent congresses. They also wanted a more open party, especially to intellectuals, economic forces, and associations. After many failures in Rome, the party should start building the way toward federalism "outside the Parliament", by forming alliances among regions, provinces and municipalities. The party should also adopt a different language: in fact, the proponents realized how some "xenophobic statements, calls for localistic isolation and invocations of a token traditionalism had damaged the cause and the growth of the League. [...] Local autonomy intended as autarchy is anachronistic, while it must be conceived as a value [...] toward international openness, as the glorious Venetian history tells us!". The League should be able to talk to a larger portion of the electorate, by reclaiming "the Catholic, socialist, liberal, ecc. strains of ideas" and by "irrevocably leaving the rusty alternative between right and left behind": "For too long the League has been stuck in a contradiction. On one side it has presented itself as a movement for institutional reform and, as such, super parties. On the other, it has allowed itself to be absorbed in the right/left dialectic. The real battle today is between idolatry of the state and federalism, between an artificial institution and the real communities. Neither with the right nor with the left: the League is above."

=== 2015–2020 platform ===
In the run-up of the 2015 regional election the party did not release a platform, leaving room for Luca Zaia's "government program" for the 2015–2020 term. Consistently with Zaia's social-democratic political instincts and his fascination for Tony Blair's New Labour, the document had a special focus on labour, welfare and the reform of public services. The platform notably included a commitment to bring forward two referendums, one on autonomy and another on independence.

=== 2020–2025 platform ===
The platform for the 2020 regional election was very similar from the previous one and, as usual, it was centred on Venetian autonomy. Over the years, Zaia has long explained his position as "liberal", "moderate” and "progressive", aiming for the League as a whole to be a true "liberal party of the territories".

=== End-of-life care ===
Under Zaia's impulse, the party generally holds social-liberal positions, especially on end-of-life care. In January 2024, a majority of LV's regional councillors, described as "progressive" by news sources, supported a bill that would have regulated assisted suicide for terminally ill patients, under particular conditions. The bill, inspired by a campaign by Associazione Luca Coscioni and supported also by the party's regional secretary Alberto Stefani, was however defeated by one single vote in the Regional Council as it was opposed by a large minority of the party's councillors, as well as the party's more conservative allies and one dissenting councillor of the Democratic Party. In September 2026, again under the impulse of Zaia, then president of the Council, and the mediation of Stefani, then president of Veneto, the assembly approved a modified version of the bill by a bipartisan vote, with the support of 16 LV councillors out of 19, one councillor each of Forza Italia (FI) and Liga Veneta Repubblica and the centre-left minority, and the opposition of the Brothers of Italy, two FI councillors out of three and Resist Veneto.

=== 2025–2030 platform ===
The platform for the 2025 regional election, the first under Alberto Stefani, was named "Veneto, a community". Other key words were "solidarity", "identity" and "roots", interpreted through the philosophical perspective of Simone Weil ("To be rooted is perhaps the most important and least recognised need of the human soul"). Besides the usual chapters on Venetian identity, autonomy and federalist reforms, the platform was focused especially on welfare, health-care, labour and urban planning. Chief attention was given to the elderly and the young. Central tenets of the platform were also the environment and sustainability. The approach was described as "big-tent", "Christian-democratic" and distinctly "centrist".

According to political scientist Paolo Graziano, "the 'Zaian' League is very different from the traditional one, and Stefani is the product of a Christian-democratic League. His Catholic profile and his studies in canon law also suggest this. This positioning gives him the opportunity to differentiate himself from Zaia and define his own profile".

== Factions ==
Within the party, there are no formal factions, yet there are some unofficial groupings.

Gian Paolo Gobbo and Luca Zaia have long been the leaders of the wing from Treviso, which has its roots in the original Liga Veneta and is more Venetist in character, while the Verona wing, whose standard-bearers have been Flavio Tosi, Federico Bricolo and Lorenzo Fontana, has usually been more conservative and has had stronger links with Lega Lombarda. While Lighisti from Venice are usually closer to Gobbo and Zaia, those from Vicenza and Padua are set somewhere in the middle between Treviso and Verona.

An ideological strain worth of mention is embodied by pure Venetists who stress issues such as Venetian identity and language: they have notably included Massimo Bitonci, Roberto Ciambetti, Daniele Stival, Giovanni Furlanetto, Roberto Marcato and Nicola Finco. This has never been a united group: Furlanetto left the party in 2013, Stival left the party in 2015 following Tosi, Bitonci has since become a close supporter of Matteo Salvini's political line, while Ciambetti and Marcato have been closer to Zaia.

It is difficult to say who was more conservative or liberal between Tosi and Zaia, who have often exchanged their positions within the party. Tosi was a more traditional conservative-liberal, while Zaia, while being a centrist, has resembled a green-populist position on environmental issues, nuclear power, GMOs, etc. In occasion of the 2011 referendums, Zaia declared his support for three referendums aimed at blocking the return to nuclear energy and the privatisation of water services. Needless to say, Tosi declared himself a "keen nuclearist" and a supporter of the free market instead. At the federal level of the party, Tosi was a long-time ally of Roberto Maroni, but fell out with his successor Salvini.

Gobbo was last re-elected secretary in 2008 due to an agreement with Tosi, who was Gobbo's strongest rival for the leadership. At the 2012 congress Tosi defeated the Venetists' standard-bearer Bitonci, who was supported by 43% of delegates and most MPs. In 2011 in the party were outraged when Tosi, as mayor of Verona, announced that he was going to celebrate the 150th anniversary of Italian unification and declared that Italian unity was a good thing. Gobbo promptly disavowed Tosi and confirmed that the party was opposed to any celebration. Tosi was criticised also by other party bigwigs, such as Francesca Martini, while Furlanetto proposed the ejection of Tosi from the party. In early 2012 another friction was caused by Tosi's decision to present a personal list, alongside the party's one, in the forthcoming Verona municipal election and his intention to drop its traditional ally, The People of Freedom. Not only Gobbo opposed the move by Tosi, but he also took the opportunity to describe Tosi's views on Italy and Padania as "heresy". Tosi was finally ejected in 2015 and would join Forza Italia in 2022.

More recently, the party was broadly divided in two groups: one closer to Salvini and the federal party including Alberto Stefani, Massimo Bitonci, Lorenzo Fontana, Andrea Ostellari and Mara Bizzotto, the other closer to Gobbo and Zaia including Roberto Marcato, Franco Manzato and Gianantonio Da Re. However, the second group was divided during the 2023 congress, during which Manzato ran without the support of Zaia, Marcato retired from the race and Zaia silently supported Stefani (see history section above).

== Popular support ==
The party has its strongholds in the provinces of the Pedemontana (40–60% of the vote), that is to say the area at the feet of the Venetian Prealps.

In the 2020 regional election the party ran with two lists (the official one and Luca Zaia's personal list, whose candidates were all members of the party), doing well in most of the region. The best combined result was in Zaia's province of Treviso (68.6%). Treviso was followed by Belluno (64.1%), Vicenza (62.2%), Venice (61.7%), Padua (59.8%), Rovigo (58.6%) and Verona (55.5%).

The electoral results of Liga Veneta in Veneto since 1983 are shown in the tables below.

Regional Council of Veneto

Election year	Votes	%	Seats	±
1985	112,275 (5th)	3.7	2 / 60	–
1990	180,676 (5th)	5.9	3 / 60	▲1
1995	422,410 (3rd)	16.7	9 / 65	▲6
2000	274,472 (4th)	12.0	7 / 60	▼2
2005	337,896 (3rd)	14.7	11 / 60	▲4
2010	788,581 (1st)	35.2	20 / 60	▲9
2015	427,363 (1st); 329,966 (2nd)	23.1 (Zaia List); 17.8 (LV)	24 / 51	▲4
2020	916,087 (1st); 347,832 (2nd)	44.6 (Zaia List); 16.9 (LV)	33 / 51	▲9
2025	607,220 (1st)	36.3	20 / 51	▼13

Chamber of Deputies

Election year	Votes	%	Seats	±
1983	123,902 (5th)	4.5	1 / 46	▲1
1987	96,350 (6th)	3.1	0 / 46	▼1
1992	576,166 (2nd)	17.8	8 / 43	▲8
1994	713,730 (2nd)	21.5	23 / 37	▲15
1996	928,059 (1st)	29.3	19 / 37	▼4
2001	315,000 (4th)	10.3	9 / 37	▼10
2006	353,257 (4th)	11.1	5 / 49	▼4
2008	830,446 (2nd)	27.1	16 / 50	▲11
2013	310,010 (4th)	10.5	5 / 51	▼11
2018	920,368 (1st)	32.2	23 / 50	▲18
2022	365,290 (3rd)	14.5	9 / 32	▼14

Senate of the Republic

Election year	Votes	%	Seats	±
1983	91,171 (7th)	3.7	1 / 23	▲1
1987	85,649 (5th)	3.3	0 / 23	▼1
1992	464,410 (2nd)	16.2	4 / 23	▲4
1994	with PdL		11 / 23	▲7
1996	839,339 (3rd)	30.3	9 / 23	▼2
2001	with CdL		4 / 23	▼5
2006	322,056 (5th)	10.1	3 / 24	▼1
2008	738,230 (3rd)	26.1	7 / 24	▲4
2013	228,295 (5th)	11.0	5 / 24	▼2
2018	839,586 (1st)	31.8	9 / 24	▲4
2022	366,266 (3rd)	14.6	4 / 16	▼5

European Parliament

Election year	Votes	%	Seats	±
1989	49,904 (9th)	1.7	0 / 87	–
1994	437,695 (2nd)	15.7	2 / 87	▲2
1999	280,328 (4th)	10.7	1 / 87	▼1
2004	389,440 (3rd)	14.1	1 / 78	–
2009	767,088 (2nd)	28.4	3 / 72	▲2
2014	364,477 (3rd)	15.2	2 / 73	▼1
2019	1,234,610 (1st)	49.9	4 / 76	▲1
2024	271,142 (3rd)	13.2	1 / 76	▼3

== Leadership ==
- Secretary: Achille Tramarin (1980−1983), Marilena Marin (1983−1984), Franco Rocchetta (1984−1985), Marilena Marin (1985−1994), Fabrizio Comencini (1994−1998), Gian Paolo Gobbo (1998−2012), Flavio Tosi (2012−2015), Gianpaolo Dozzo (commissioner 2015–2016), Gianantonio Da Re (2016–2019), Lorenzo Fontana (commissioner 2019–2020), Alberto Stefani (2020–2026, commissioner 2020–2023), Andrea Tomaello (commissioner 2026–present)
- President: Franco Rocchetta (1991−1994), Gian Paolo Gobbo (1994−1998), Giuseppe Ceccato (1998–1999), Manuela Dal Lago (2001−2008), Flavio Tosi (2008−2012), Luca Baggio (2012–2015), Massimo Bitonci (2016–2020)
- Party Leader in the Regional Council: Franco Rocchetta (1985–1994), Gian Paolo Gobbo (1994–2000), Flavio Tosi (2000–2002), Franco Manzato (2002–2008), Gianpaolo Bottacin (2008–2009), Roberto Ciambetti (2009–2010), Federico Caner (2010–2015), Nicola Finco and Silvia Rizzotto (2015–2020), Giuseppe Pan and Alberto Villanova (2020–2025), Riccardo Barbisan and Matteo Pressi (2025–present)

== Notable members ==
Two members of the LV have served as President of Veneto:

- Luca Zaia (2010–2025)
- Alberto Stefani (2025–present)

Five members of the LV have served as Vice President of Veneto:

- Gian Paolo Gobbo (1994–1995)
- Luca Zaia (2005–2008)
- Franco Manzato (2008–2010)
- Gianluca Forcolin (2015–2020)
- Elisa De Berti (2020–2025)

Four members of the LV have served as President of the Regional Council of Veneto:

- Enrico Cavaliere (2000–2005)
- Marino Finozzi (2005–2010)
- Roberto Ciambetti (2015–2025)
- Luca Zaia (2025–present)

One member of the LV has served as President of the Chamber of Deputies:

- Lorenzo Fontana (2022–present)

Two members of the LV have served as Ministers of the Italian Government:

- Erika Stefani (2018–2019, 2021–2022)
- Lorenzo Fontana (2018–2019)

Three members of the LV have served as federal president of Lega Nord (LN):

- Franco Rocchetta (1991−1994)
- Stefano Stefani (1995−2002)
- Luciano Gasperini (2002−2005)

One member of the LV has served as leader of the LN in the Chamber of Deputies:

- Gianpaolo Dozzo (2012–2013)

Three members of the LV have served as leader of the LN in the Senate:

- Luciano Gasperini (1998−1999)
- Federico Bricolo (2008−2013)
- Massimo Bitonci (2013–2014)

Three members of the LV have served as head of the delegation of LN at the European Parliament:

- Lorenzo Fontana (2012–2014)
- Mara Bizzotto (2018–2019)
- Paolo Borchia (2024–present)

Five members of the LV have served as federal deputy secretary of the LN and Lega:

- Gianpaolo Dozzo (1998–1999)
- Federico Caner (2012–2013)
- Flavio Tosi (2013–2014)
- Lorenzo Fontana (2016–2024)
- Alberto Stefani (2024–present)

One member of the LV has served as federal administrative secretary of the LN:

- Stefano Stefani (2012–2014)

In April 2012 Manuela Dal Lago was appointed member of the triumvirate who replaced Umberto Bossi at the head of the LN and temporarily led the party.

Luciano Gasperini was LN's candidate for President of the Republic in the 1999 presidential election.

== Breakaway groups ==
- Liga Federativa Veneta (LFV – started in 1983, merged into MVRA in 1987)
- Liga Veneta Serenissima (LVS – started in 1984, merged into UPV in 1987)
- Venetian Most Serene Government (VSG – started in 1987, still active)
- Veneto Autonomous Region Movement (MVRA – started in 1987, merged into LVR/VdE in 2000)
- Union of the Venetian People (UPV – started in 1987, merged into LV in 1995)
- Liga Nathion Veneta (LNV – started in 1994, disbanded)
- North-East Union (UNE – started in 1996, briefly merged into LVR/VdE in 1999, disbanded)
- Liga Veneta Repubblica (LVR – started in 1998)
- Veneto Padanian Federal Republic (VRFP – started in 1999, disbanded)
- Liga dei Veneti (LdV – started in 1999, merged into PNE in 2004)
- Future Veneto (VF – started in 1999 as part of ApE, merged into LVR in 2000)
- Party for Independent Veneto (started in 2007, disbanded)
- Community Democratic League / Venetian Project (LDC/PV – started in 2011, merged into VS in 2012)
- Venetian Independence (IV – started in 2012, joined the PdV of 2019 in 2019)
- Veneto First (PiV – started in 2013, joined the Greath North)
- Tosi List for Veneto (LTV – started in 2015, merged into FI in 2022)

== See also ==
- Politics of Veneto

== Sources ==
- Francesco Jori, Dalla Łiga alla Lega. Storia, movimenti, protagonisti, Marsilio, Venice 2009
- Ezio Toffano, Short History of the Venetian Autonomism, Raixe Venete
- Furio Gallina, Die venezianischen Lega – Bewegungen von den Anfängen bis zur Entstehung der Lega Nord, in Vv.Aa., Jeder für sich oder alle gemeinsam in Europa? Die Debatte über Identität, Wohlstand und die institutionellen Grundlagen der Union, Nomos, Baden-Baden, 2013, pp. 35–50.
- Veneto Region – Legislatures
- Regional Council of Veneto – Elections
- Cattaneo Institute – Archive of Election Data
- Ministry of the Interior – Historical Archive of Elections
