= List of Lega Nord politicians =

A list of notable Lega Nord politicians of Italy:

== A ==
- Angelo Alessandri

== B ==
- Massimo Bitonci
- Mario Borghezio
- Renzo Bossi
- Umberto Bossi
- Gianpaolo Bottacin
- Federico Bricolo
- Gianluca Buonanno

== C ==
- Roberto Calderoli
- Davide Caparini
- Sergio Castellaneta
- Roberto Castelli
- Enrico Cavaliere
- Domenico Comino
- Roberto Cota

== D ==
- Manuela Dal Lago
- Gianpaolo Dozzo

== F ==
- Gipo Farassino
- Attilio Fontana
- Marco Formentini

== G ==
- Luciano Gasperini
- Giancarlo Gentilini
- Giancarlo Giorgetti
- Gian Paolo Gobbo

== M ==
- Marilena Marin
- Roberto Maroni
- Francesca Martini
- Gianfranco Miglio
- Roberto Mura

== P ==
- Giancarlo Pagliarini
- Irene Pivetti

== R ==
- Marco Reguzzoni
- Massimiliano Romeo

== S ==
- Matteo Salvini
- Francesco Speroni

== T ==
- Flavio Tosi

== Z ==
- Luca Zaia
