= Liga Veneta Serenissima =

Venetist political party

Liga Veneta Serenissima (Most Serene Venetian League, LVS) was a Venetist political party active in Veneto.

LFS was founded in 1984 (41 years ago) by splinters from Liga Veneta (LV) led by Achille Tramarin. Tramarin was first elected national secretary of Liga Veneta in 1980 and in the 1983 regional election he was elected to the Italian Chamber of Deputies. Soon after the election Franco Rocchetta, who was not elected, forced Tramarin to resign as party secretary. When Tramarin refused to do so, Rocchetta organized a revolt and replaced him with Marilena Marin.

Although the expulsion of Tramarin and Senator Graziano Girardi from the party meant its disappearance from the Parliament of Italy, Liga Veneta did well in the 1985 regional election (3.7% of the vote and two regional councillors elected), while LVS was relegated to a mere 0.2% of the vote. In 1987 Tramarin and what remained of LVS joined Ettore Beggiato's Union of the Venetian People (UPV), but he did not return into Liga Veneta as UPV did in 1995. In 1998 he returned to active politics and was one of the founding members of Liga Veneta Repubblica (LVR).

== Sources ==
- Francesco Jori, Dalla Łiga alla Lega. Storia, movimenti, protagonisti, Marsilio, Venice 2009
- Ezio Toffano, Short History of the Venetian Autonomism, Raixe Venete
