= Governments of Veneto =

This is the list of governments of Veneto since 1970.

Governments of Veneto
Government	President	Party	Coalition	Vice President	Party	Term	Legislature
Tomelleri I	Angelo Tomelleri	DC	DC	Paolo Tartari	DC	1970–1971	I Legislature
Tomelleri II	Angelo Tomelleri	DC	DC	Paolo Tartari	DC	1971–1972	I Legislature
Feltrin	Piero Feltrin	DC	DC	Paolo Tartari	DC	1972–1973	I Legislature
Tomelleri III	Angelo Tomelleri	DC	DC	Marino Cortese	DC	1973–1975	I Legislature
Tomelleri IV	Angelo Tomelleri	DC	DC–PRI	Giancarlo Gambaro	DC	1975–1977	II Legislature
Tomelleri V	Angelo Tomelleri	DC	DC	Marino Cortese	DC	1977–1980	II Legislature
Bernini I	Carlo Bernini	DC	DC–PSDI (Note: The PSDI joined the government in 1981.)	Marino Cortese	DC	1980–1985	III Legislature
Bernini II	Carlo Bernini	DC	DC–PSI–PSDI–PLI	Umberto Carraro	PSI	1985–1989	IV Legislature
Cremonese I	Gianfranco Cremonese	DC	DC–PSI–PSDI–PLI	Umberto Carraro	PSI	1989–1990	IV Legislature
Cremonese II	Gianfranco Cremonese	DC	DC–PSI–PRI–PSDI	Amalia Sartori	PSI	1990–1992	V Legislature
Frigo	Franco Frigo	DC	DC–PSI–FdV	Renzo Burro	PSI	1992–1993	V Legislature
Pupillo	Giuseppe Pupillo	PDS	DC–PDS (Note: The PDS succeeded to the PCI in 1991.)–PSI–FdV–UPV	Carlo Alberto Tesserin	DC	1993–1994	V Legislature
Bottin	Aldo Bottin	PPI	PPI (Note: The PPI succeeded to the DC in 1994.)–LV–FI (Note: Some members of the disbanded DC formed FI in 1994.)–UPV–PLI–CPA–LP	Gian Paolo Gobbo	LV	1994–1995	V Legislature
Galan I	Giancarlo Galan	FI	FI–AN–CDU (Note: The regional councillors of the CDU were elected from a joint list with FI.)–CCD	Bruno Canella	AN	1995–2000	VI Legislature
Galan II	Giancarlo Galan	FI	FI–LV–AN–CDU (Note: The CDU and the CCD were merged into the UDC in 2002.)–CCD	Fabio Gava	FI	2000–2005	VII Legislature
Galan III	Giancarlo Galan	FI	FI (Note: FI and AN were merged into the PdL in 2009.)–LV–AN–UDC–NPSI	Luca Zaia (until 2008); Franco Manzato (since 2008)	LV	2005–2010	VIII Legislature
Zaia I	Luca Zaia	LV	LV–PdL (Note: The PdL was disbanded in 2013; its members joined either FI or the NCD. Vice President Marino Zorzato joined the NCD.)	Marino Zorzato	PdL	2010–2015	IX Legislature
Zaia II	Luca Zaia	LV	LV–FI (Note: The party's sole regional minister, Elena Donazzan left in 2018 and joined FdI in 2019.)	Gianluca Forcolin	LV	2015–2020	X Legislature
Zaia III	Luca Zaia	LV	LV–FdI	Elisa De Berti	LV	2020–2025	XI Legislature
Stefani	Alberto Stefani	LV	LV–FdI–FI	TBD	TBD	2025–present	XII Legislature

Source: Region of Veneto
