= 1992 Italian general election in Veneto =

The Italian general election of 1992 took place on 5–6 March 1992.

The election was a realigning one in Italy, due to the rise of Lega Nord, a federation of northern regionalist parties of which LV was a founding member. The realignment was especially visible in Veneto, where DC, though still being the largest party, lost almost a third of its voters between 1987 and 1992, stopping at 31.5%. LV gained ground in the Pedemontana, that is to say the provinces at the feet of the mountains, most of which had long been Christian Democratic heartlands: 21.5% in the province of Treviso, 20.6% in Verona and 19.5% in Vicenza. In Belluno LV became the largest party with 27.8%, by reducing the vote of DC and halving that of the PSI. The total score of Venetist parties was 31.8% in Vicenza, 29.3% in Treviso, 27.2% in Verona and 22.9% in Padua. The PDS got just 9.9% regionally, fairly less than the PCI in 1990.

== Results ==
=== Chamber of Deputies ===
| Party | votes | votes (%) | seats |
|---|---|---|---|
| Christian Democracy | 1,018,522 | 31.5 | 15 |
| Lega Nord* | 576,079 | 17.8 | 8 |
| Italian Socialist Party | 345,522 | 10.7 | 5 |
| Democratic Party of the Left | 321,464 | 9.9 | 5 |
| Lega Autonomia Veneta | 152,280 | 4.7 | 1 |
| Italian Republican Party | 119,889 | 3.7 | 2 |
| Communist Refoundation Party | 116,814 | 3.6 | 2 |
| Italian Social Movement | 104,369 | 3.2 | 1 |
| Federation of the Greens | 103,059 | 3.2 | 2 |
| Italian Liberal Party | 61,889 | 1.9 | 1 |
| The Network | 52,143 | 1.6 | 1 |
| Veneto Autonomous Region Movement | 49,031 | 1.5 | - |
| Union of the Venetian People | 48,805 | 1.5 | - |
| Italian Democratic Socialist Party | 46,370 | 1.4 | - |
| Pannella List | 33,097 | 1.0 | - |
| Others | 83,624 | 2.6 | - |
| Total | 3,232,957 | 100.0 | 43 |

* = Including Liga Veneta.
Source: Regional Council of Veneto

==== Provincial breakdown ====
| Province | DC | LV | Ven. | PSI | PDS |
| Verona | 34.0 | 20.6 | 6.6 | 11.1 | 7.1 |
| Vicenza | 34.3 | 19.5 | 12.3 | 7.9 | 5.6 |
| Padua | 34.5 | 14.8 | 8.1 | 9.3 | 10.5 |
| Treviso | 32.9 | 21.5 | 7.8 | 9.7 | 7.5 |
| Belluno | 27.4 | 27.8 | - | 14.3 | 8.0 |
| Venice | 23.8 | 13.4 | 6.6 | 13.0 | 16.2 |
| Rovigo | 29.5 | 8.5 | 6.1 | 14.1 | 18.1 |
| Veneto | 31.5 | 17.8 | 7.7 | 10.6 | 9.9 |

Ven. = Other Venetists, including LAV, UPV and MVRA.
Source: Regional Council of Veneto

=== Senate ===
| Party | votes | votes (%) | seats |
|---|---|---|---|
| Christian Democracy | 890,493 | 32.2 | 9 |
| Lega Nord* | 454,293 | 16.4 | 4 |
| Italian Socialist Party | 297,690 | 10.8 | 3 |
| Democratic Party of the Left | 289,862 | 10.5 | 3 |
| Lega Autonomia Veneta | 137,988 | 5.0 | 1 |
| Communist Refoundation Party | 116,748 | 4.2 | 1 |
| Italian Republican Party | 116,182 | 4.2 | 1 |
| Italian Social Movement | 92,547 | 3.3 | 1 |
| Federation of the Greens | 85,379 | 3.1 | - |
| Veneto Autonomous Region Movement | 53,880 | 1.9 | - |
| Italian Liberal Party | 50,100 | 1.8 | - |
| Union of the Venetian People | 43,292 | 1.6 | - |
| Italian Democratic Socialist Party | 40,258 | 1.5 | - |
| Others | 100,313 | 3.7 | - |
| Total | 2,769,025 | 100.0 | 23 |

* = Including Liga Veneta.
Source: Regional Council of Veneto
