= Gianpaolo Dozzo =

Italian politician (1954–2024)

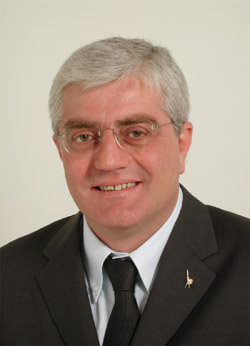
- Gianpaolo Dozzo in 2001
- Born: 2 October 1954
- Died: 4 June 2024 (aged 69)
- Occupation: Politician

Gianpaolo Dozzo (2 October 1954 – 4 June 2024) was a Venetist politician and leading member of the Liga Veneta–Lega Nord.

Dozzo joined Liga Veneta in 1982, seven years before the foundation of Lega Nord, and was first elected to the Chamber of Deputies in 1994. He was then re-elected in 1996, 2001, 2006 and 2008, being one of the League's longest-serving MPs. Between 2001 and 2006 Dozzo was undersecretary of Agriculture in Berlusconi II and III Cabinets. In January 2012 Dozzo was appointed floor leader of the party in the Chamber, the first Venetian in that role. He did not stand for re-election in 2013. Dozzo died on 4 June 2024, at the age of 69.

== Biography ==
He began his political career at the municipal level, serving four consecutive terms (1985–2004, with the exception of a break from 1996 to 1999 due to his election as a member of the Chamber of Deputies) on the city council of Quinto di Treviso (Treviso), always as a member of the Liga Veneta-Lega Nord.

In the 1994 general election, he ran for the Chamber of Deputies (Italy) in the Castelfranco Veneto electoral district, backed by the center-right coalition Polo delle Libertà as a candidate from the Lega Nord, and was elected deputy with 55.37% of the vote, defeating the candidates from the Patto per l'Italia—Mario Frasson (22.83%), Nazzareno Bolzon of the Progressisti (16.1%), and Pier Francesco Cappelletto of National Alliance (Italy)(5.69%). During the 12th Legislature of the Republic, he served as a member of the 13th Agriculture Committee, the Special Committee on Community Policies, and the Parliamentary Commission of Inquiry into the State Agency for Agricultural Market Interventions.

In the 1995 municipal elections in Veneto, he was elected for the third time as a city council member of Quinto di Treviso, serving in that position until July 19, 1996.

He was re-elected to the Chamber of Deputies in the 1996 general election, serving as deputy leader of his party in the Chamber, and in the 2001 election in the Palazzo Montecitorio congressional district.

He served as Undersecretary (Italy) of state at the Ministry of Agriculture and Forestry in the Berlusconi II and III administrations.

In the 2006 general election, he was re-elected as a member of the Chamber of Deputies from the Veneto 2 constituency. During the 15th legislature, he served as a member of the 13th Agriculture Committee and as deputy deputy leader of the Lega Nord in the Chamber of Deputies.

He was re-elected in the 2008 general election, and on January 26, 2012, he replaced Marco Reguzzoni as the Northern League’s floor leader in the Chamber of Deputies (Italy).

On December 4, 2011, he was appointed vice president of the Padanian Parliament of the North by President Roberto Calderoli.

On March 2, 2015, he was appointed by the Federal Council of the Northern League as an ad acta commissioner to manage the Liga Veneta in preparation for that year’s regional elections in Veneto, remaining in office until Gianantonio Da Re was elected secretary.
