= President of the Regional Council of Veneto =

Head of the government of Veneto

The president of the Regional Council of Veneto is the presiding officer of the Regional Council of Veneto, the legislative assembly of Veneto. The office is established by the articles 10 and 11 of the Statute of Veneto. The president is elected by the absolute majority (two thirds in the first two rounds of vote) of the Regional Council in the first session of the new legislature and his term ends at the end of the legislature.

The current president is Luca Zaia of Liga Veneta–Lega.

== List ==
| Name | Party | Period | | Legislature |
|---|---|---|---|---|
| Vito Orcalli | DC | 6 July 1970 | 12 November 1974 | I (1970) |
| Giancarlo Gambaro | DC | 12 November 1974 | 14 July 1975 | I (1970) |
| Giancarlo Gambaro | DC | 14 July 1975 | 19 September 1975 | II (1975) |
| Bruno Marchetti | PSI | 19 September 1975 | 14 July 1980 | II (1975) |
| Bruno Marchetti | PSI | 14 July 1980 | 17 June 1985 | III (1980) |
| Carlo Bernini | DC | 17 June 1985 | 29 July 1985 | IV (1985) |
| Francesco Guidolin | DC | 29 July 1985 | 11 June 1990 | IV (1985) |
| Amalia Sartori | PSI | 11 June 1990 | 30 July 1990 | V (1990) |
| Umberto Carraro | PSI | 30 July 1990 | 5 June 1995 | V (1990) |
| Amalia Sartori | FI | 5 June 1995 | 29 May 2000 | VI (1995) |
| Enrico Cavaliere | LV–LN | 29 May 2000 | 9 May 2005 | VII (2000) |
| Marino Finozzi | LV–LN | 9 May 2005 | 26 April 2010 | VIII (2005) |
| Clodovaldo Ruffato | PdL | 26 April 2010 | 26 June 2015 | IX (2010) |
| Roberto Ciambetti | LV–LN | 26 June 2015 | 15 October 2020 | X (2015) |
| Roberto Ciambetti | LV–LN | 15 October 2020 | 15 December 2025 | XI (2020) |
| Luca Zaia | LV–Lega | 15 December 2025 | present | XII (2025) |

Source: Regional Council of Veneto
