= Manuela Lanzarin =

Italian politician

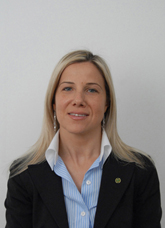
Manuela Lanzarin

Manuela Lanzarin (born 3 June 1971 in Bassano del Grappa) is a Venetist politician from Veneto, Italy.

A member of Liga Veneta–Lega Nord since the early 1990s, Lanzarin was mayor of Rosà from 2002 to 2012. In the 2008 general election she was elected to the Chamber of Deputies. In the 2013 general election she got a low slot in the party's Venetian slate for the Senate and was not elected. In fact, due to her closeness to Luca Zaia and her loyalty to former Lega Nord leader Umberto Bossi, she was not popular with the new leadership led by Flavio Tosi.

In the 2015 regional election, after Tosi was sidelined by the federal party, Lanzarin made her comeback and was elected to the Regional Council from Zaia's personal list in the province of Vicenza. After the election, Zaia, who had been re-elected President, appointed her regional minister of Social Affairs in his second government. In 2019, she was additionally appointed regional minister of Health, after Luca Coletto resigned to become under-secretary of Health.

In the 2020 regional election Lanzarin was re-elected to the Regional Council from the province of Vicenza. Subsequently, she was re-appointed minister of Health and Social Affairs in Zaia's third government.
