= Corazzari =

Corazzari is a surname. Notable people with the surname include:

- Bruno Corazzari (1940–2021), Italian actor
- Cristiano Corazzari (born 1975), Italian politician
