= Giuseppe Pan =

Italian politician (born 1962)

Giuseppe Pan (born 5 March 1962 in Bassano del Grappa) is a Venetist politician from Veneto, Italy. A member of Liga Veneta–Lega Nord, Pan started to be involved in municipal politics in his hometown, Cittadella. In 1998, when the party split over Venetism and Padanism, he followed mayor Lucio Facco and deputy mayor Massimo Bitonci into Liga Veneta Repubblica. From 2002 to 2012, Pan served as deputy mayor of Cittadella, under Bitonci, and they both re-joined Liga Veneta. In 2012 Pan, whose bid was supported only by Liga Veneta, finally succeeded to Bitonci as mayor.

As mayor, Pan, a member of the Venetist faction of Bitonci, Roberto Marcato and Luca Zaia, was an outspoken supporter of the independence of Veneto and, as such, he sketched out his bid for the Regional Council of Veneto in the 2015 regional election, in which he was controversially excluded from the council, for technical reasons. Despite this, Pan, who looked a shoo-in to become the party's floor leader, was appointed regional minister of Agriculture, Hunting and Fishing in Zaia's second government. In the 2020 regional election Pan was elected to the Regional Council from the province of Padua and was subsequently appointed LV floor leader.
