= Achille Tramarin =

Italian politician

Achille Tramarin (Padua, 12 August 1946 - Padua, 29 June 2017) was an Italian Venetist politician.

== Career ==
In 1978–1980 he took part in the foundation of Liga Veneta, and in 1980, he was elected the first national secretary of the party. During the party's first official meeting in Recoaro on 9 December 1979, Tramarin gave a famous speech titled Venetian Autonomy and Europe: "Today for Venetians the moment has come, after 113 years of Italian unitary colonization, to take their natural and human resources back, to fight against the wild exploitation that has brought emigration, pollution and rooting out from their culture".

In 1983, he was elected to the Italian Chamber of Deputies and thus became the first deputy in his party's history. Soon after the election Franco Rocchetta, who had been behind the scenes up to that moment and was disappointed by his missed election, hinted that Tramarin should step down from the post of party leader. After a power struggle, Rocchetta won the battle for the party's leadership and Tramarin was replaced as national secretary by Marilena Marin, future wife of Rocchetta. Subsequently, Tramarin, while continuing to represent Liga Veneta in the Italian Parliament, was ousted from the party and formed Liga Veneta Serenissima, which proved to be a very unsuccessful political party, gaining only 0.2% of the vote in the 1985 regional election.

Tramarin never joined Lega Nord but had been active in Liga Veneta Repubblica, a minor Venetist party led by Fabrizio Comencini.
