= Andrea Zanoni =

Italian politician (born 1965)

Andrea Zanoni (born 26 August 1965, Treviso) is an Italian politician from Veneto.

A long-time green and animal rights activist, Zanoni was an unsuccessful candidate of the Federation of the Greens (FdV) in the 2005 Venetian regional election. Having joined Italy of Values for the 2009 European Parliament election, he was elected to the European Parliament, where he switched to the Democratic Party (PD) in 2013. He was not re-elected in 2014.

In the 2015 Venetian regional election Zanoni was elected to the Regional Council of Veneto for the PD. Zanoni was re-elected for a second term as regional councillor in 2020.

In 2025 Zanoni left the PD and joined Green Europe, successor of the FdV.
