= 1994 Italian general election in Veneto =

The Italian general election of 1994 took place on 27–28 March 1994.

In 1993–1994 the Tangentopoli scandals led to the disappearance of the main government parties, including Christian Democracy (DC) and the Italian Socialist Party (PSI). The DC successor, the Italian People's Party (PPI), was not able to retain the votes of its predecessor, which were largely absorbed by Liga Veneta–Lega Nord and Forza Italia, the new party launched by entrepreneur Silvio Berlusconi. In a highly fragmented party system, Forza Italia came first with 23.6% and Liga Veneta second with 21.6%.

== Results ==
=== Chamber of Deputies ===
Coalition	Single-seat constituencies			Proportional system					Total
Coalition	votes	votes (%)	seats	Party	votes	votes (%)	seats	tot.	seats
Pole of Freedoms	?	?	36	Forza Italia	767,121	23.6	2	4	40
Pole of Freedoms	?	?	36	Lega Nord	701,615	21.6	2	4	40
Alliance of Progressives	?	?	1	Democratic Party of the Left	394,699	12.2	2	3	4
Alliance of Progressives	?	?	1	Communist Refoundation Party	143,998	4.4	1	3	4
Alliance of Progressives	?	?	1	Federation of the Greens	124,107	3.8	-	3	4
Alliance of Progressives	?	?	1	Italian Socialist Party	54,090	1.7	-	3	4
Alliance of Progressives	?	?	1	Democratic Alliance	25,380	0.8	-	3	4
Pact for Italy	?	?	-	Italian People's Party	505,692	15.6	3	4	4
Pact for Italy	?	?	-	Segni Pact	152,808	4.7	1	4	4
National Alliance	?	?	-	National Alliance	251,031	7.7	1	-	1
Lega Autonomia Veneta	?	?	-	Lega Autonomia Veneta	103,976	3.2	-	-	-
Others	?	?	-	others	19,473	0.6	-	-	-
Total coalitions	?	100.0	37	Total parties	3.243.990	100.0	13	13	50

Source: Regional Council of Veneto

==== Provincial breakdown ====
Province	AN	FI	LV	PPI*	PDS
Verona	10.2	23.6	20.7	22.4	9.1
Vicenza	6.4	21.6	28.1	23.6	7.2
Padua	8.2	24.1	17.2	23.7	12.7
Treviso	6.8	22.2	28.5	18.3	9.7
Belluno	7.1	21.6	32.4	15.7	9.3
Venice	6.8	26.7	15.4	14.4	19.2
Rovigo	8.6	23.2	10.4	20.6	20.9
Veneto	7.7	23.6	21.6	20.2	12.1

* = Including Patto Segni.
Source: Regional Council of Veneto

=== Senate ===
Coalition	Single-seat constituencies			PR	Total
Coalition	votes	votes (%)	seats	seats	seats
Pole of Freedoms	1,129,315	40.7	17	-	17
Alliance of Progressives	598,790	21.6	-	3	3
Pact for Italy	545,220	19.7	-	2	2
National Alliance	221,263	8.0	-	1	1
Lega Autonomia Veneta	165,370	6.0	-	-	-
Veneto Autonomous Region Movement	64,149	2.3	-	-	-
Others	49,770	1.8	-	-	-
Total coalitions	2,773,877	100.0	17	6	23

Source: Regional Council of Veneto
