= 2024 European Parliament election in Veneto =

The European Parliament election of 2024 took place in Italy on 8–9 June 2024.

In Veneto, in a huge reversal from the previous election in 2019, the Brothers of Italy came first with 37.6% of the vote, followed by the Democratic Party (18.9%) and the League (13.2%), represented by the Venetian League in the region.

== Results ==
Party	Votes	%
Brothers of Italy	774,624	37.6
Democratic Party	389,053	18.9
Lega	271,142	13.2
Forza Italia–Us Moderates	176,891	8.6
Greens and Left Alliance	125,487	6.1
Five Star Movement	99,866	4.8
Action	84,580	4.1
United States of Europe	65,992	3.2
Peace Land Dignity	41,868	2.0
Freedom	17,635	0.9
South Tyrolean People's Party	7,418	0.4
Popular Alternative	6,632	0.3
Total	2,061,188	100.00

Source: Ministry of the Interior
