= Manzato =

Manzato is a surname. Notable people with the surname include:

- Daniel Manzato (born 1984), Swiss ice hockey player
- Franco Manzato (born 1966), Italian politician
