= 2022 Italian general election in Veneto =

- 25 September 2022

All 32 Veneto seats in the Chamber of Deputies 16 seats needed for a majority
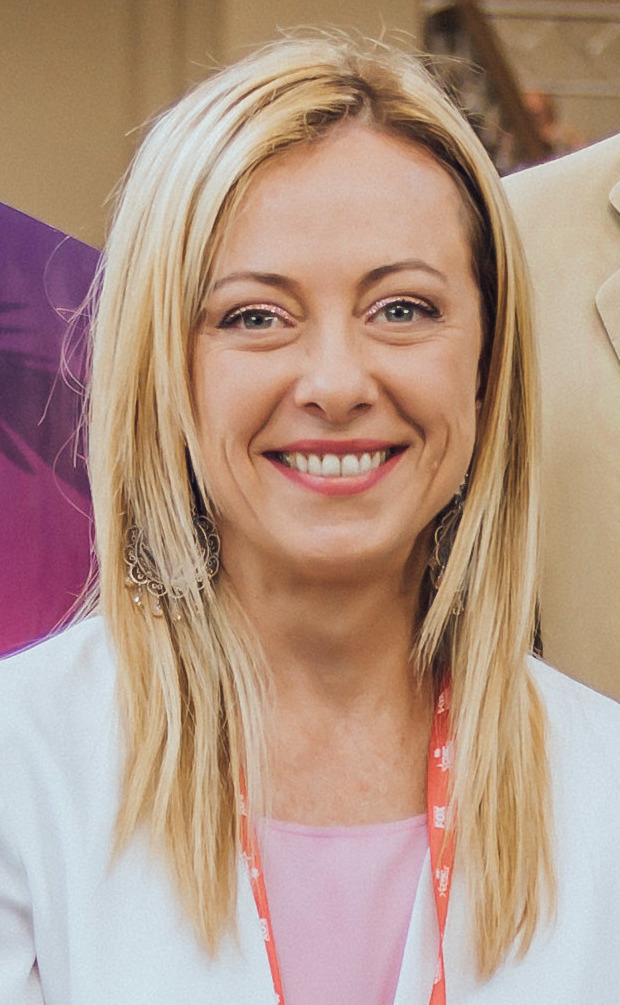

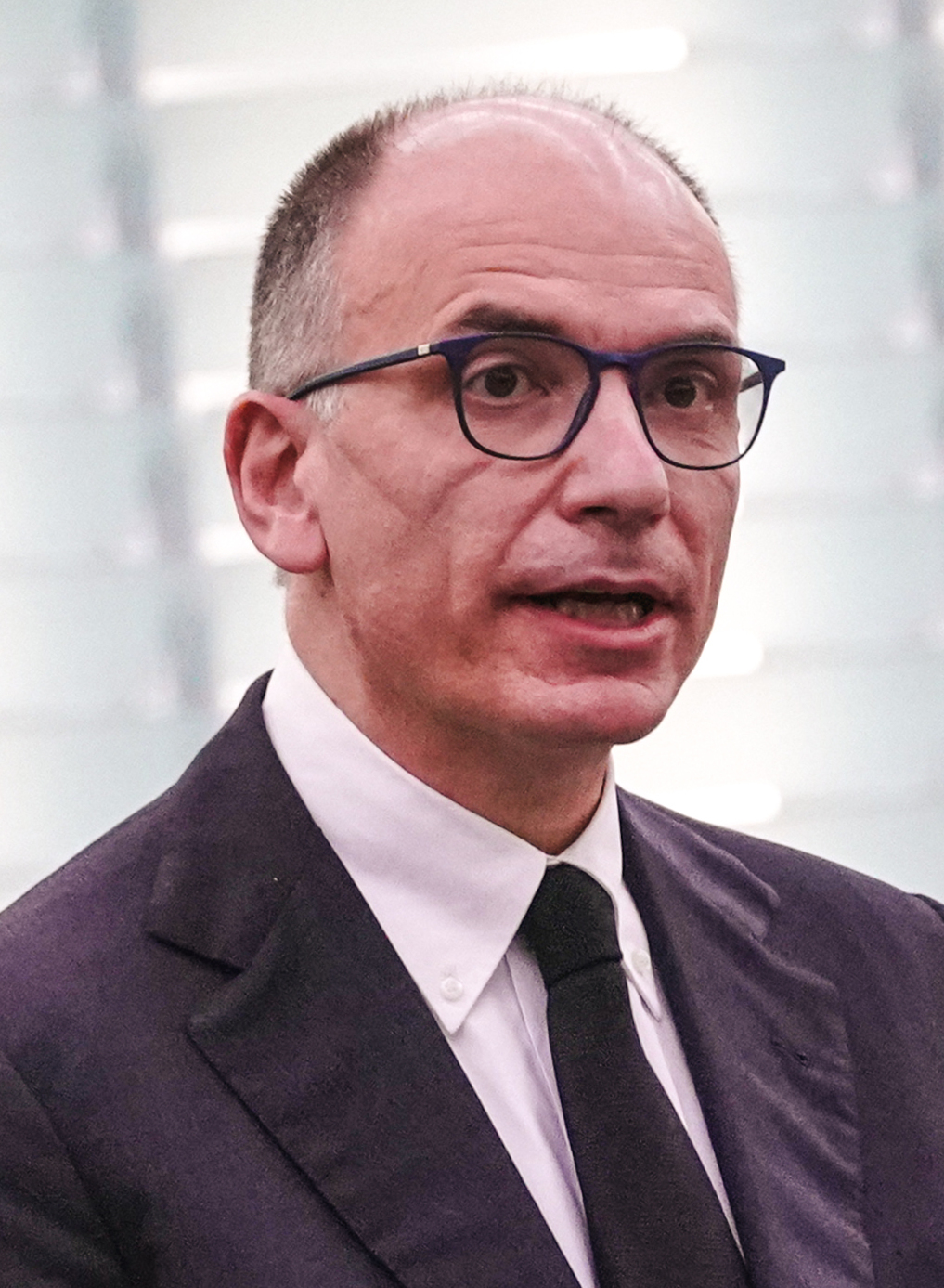

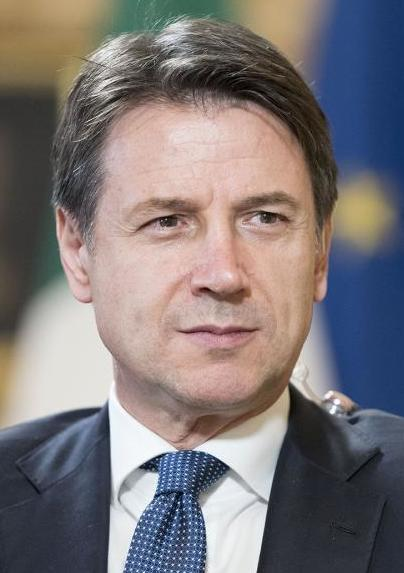
Leader	Giorgia Meloni	Enrico Letta
Alliance	Centre-right	Centre-left
Seats before	35	7
Seats won	24	5
Seat change	▼11	▼2
Popular vote	1,413,108	578,046
Percentage	56.3%	23.0%
Swing	▲8.2	▼2.7
	Third party	Fourth party
Leader	Carlo Calenda	Giuseppe Conte
Party	Action – Italia Viva	Five Star Movement
Seats before	—	8
Seats won	2	1
Seat change	New	▼7
Popular vote	210,720	146,319
Percentage	8.4%	5.8%
Swing	New	▼18.6

The Italian general election of 2022 took place on 25 September 2022.

In Veneto the centre-right coalition (56.3%), this time dominated by the Brothers of Italy, obtained a far larger victory than four years before over the centre-left coalition (23.0%), Action – Italia Viva (8.4%) and the Five Star Movement (5.8%). One third of deputies and senators were elected in single-seat constituencies and, as in 2018, the centre-right won all such constituencies. Among parties, the Brothers of Italy came largely first with 32.7% of the vote, followed by the Democratic Party (16.3%) and Lega (14.5%). The biggest turnaround happened within the centre-right, as Lega lost more than half of the votes obtained in 2018 (–17.7pp) and the Brothers of Italy jumped from 4.2% to virtually eight times that share (+28.5pp).

== Results ==
Chamber of Deputies

Coalition	Party	Proportional			First-past-the-post			Total seats
Coalition	Party	Votes	%	Seats	Votes	%	Seats	Total seats
Centre-right coalition	Brothers of Italy	821,583	32.7	7	1,413,108	56.3	5	12
Centre-right coalition	Lega (incl. Liga Veneta)	365,190	14.5	3	1,413,108	56.3	6	9
Centre-right coalition	Forza Italia	175,057	7.0	2	1,413,108	56.3	–	2
Centre-right coalition	Us Moderates	51,278	2.0	–	1,413,108	56.3	1	1
Centre-right coalition				12			12	24
Centre-left coalition	Democratic Party	409,001	16.3	4	578,406	23.0	–	4
Centre-left coalition	Greens and Left Alliance	83,426	3.3	1	578,406	23.0	–	1
Centre-left coalition	More Europe	77,238	3.1	–	578,406	23.0	–	–
Centre-left coalition	Civic Commitment	8,741	0.3	–	578,406	23.0	–	–
Centre-left coalition				5			–	5
Action – Italia Viva		210,720	8.4	2	210,720	8.4	–	2
Five Star Movement		146,319	5.8	1	146,319	5.8	–	1
Italexit		62,557	2.5	–	62,557	2.5	–	–
Vita		44,430	1.8	–	44,430	1.8	–	–
Sovereign and Popular Italy		27,853	1.1	–	27,853	1.1	–	–
People's Union		24,724	1.0	–	24,724	1.0	–	–
Alternative for Italy		3,674	0.1	–	3,674	0.1	–	–
Total		2,511,881	100.0	20	2,511,881	100.0	12	32

Sources: Regional Council of Veneto, Ministry of the Interior, Ministry of the Interior and Corriere della Sera

Senate

Coalition	Party	Proportional			First-past-the-post			Total seats
Coalition	Party	Votes	%	Seats	Votes	%	Seats	Total seats
Centre-right coalition	Brothers of Italy	817,771	32.6	3	1,410,353	56.2	2	5
Centre-right coalition	Lega (incl. Liga Veneta)	366,266	14.6	2	1,410,353	56.2	2	4
Centre-right coalition	Forza Italia	174,377	7.0	1	1,410,353	56.2	1	2
Centre-right coalition	Us Moderates	51,939	2.1	–	1,410,353	56.2	–	–
Centre-right coalition				6			5	11
Centre-left coalition	Democratic Party	404,957	16.1	2	582,005	23.2	–	2
Centre-left coalition	Greens and Left Alliance	87,476	3.5	1	582,005	23.2	–	1
Centre-left coalition	More Europe	81,708	3.3	–	582,005	23.2	–	–
Centre-left coalition	Civic Commitment	7,864	0.3	–	582,005	23.2	–	–
Centre-left coalition				3			–	3
Action – Italia Viva		210,033	8.4	1	210,033	8.4	–	1
Five Star Movement		145,545	5.8	1	145,545	5.8	–	1
Italexit		61,777	2.5	–	61,777	2.5	–	–
Vita		42,537	1.7	–	42,537	1.7	–	–
Sovereign and Popular Italy		26,627	1.1	–	26,627	1.1	–	–
People's Union		23,303	0.9	–	23,303	0.9	–	–
Alternative for Italy		8,604	0.3	–	8,604	0.3	–	–
Total		2,510,784	100.0	11	2,510,784	100.0	5	16

Sources: Regional Council of Veneto, Ministry of the Interior and Corriere della Sera
