= Second Zaia government =

The second Zaia government, led by president Luca Zaia, was the 18th government of Veneto and was in office from 28 June 2015 to 15 October 2020.

Zaia II Government
Office	Name	Party
President	Luca Zaia	Liga Veneta
Vice President	Gianluca Forcolin (until August 2020)	Liga Veneta
Minister of Budget and Local Government	Gianluca Forcolin (until August 2020)	Liga Veneta
Minister of Health and Social Programs	Luca Coletto (until December 2018)	Liga Veneta
Minister of Health and Social Programs	Manuela Lanzarin (since January 2019)	Liga Veneta
Minister of Economic Development and Energy	Roberto Marcato	Liga Veneta
Minister of Public Works, Infrastructures and Transports	Elisa De Berti	Liga Veneta
Minister of Agriculture, Hunting and Fishing	Giuseppe Pan	Liga Veneta
Minister of Education and Labour	Elena Donazzan	Forza Italia (until 2018); Brothers of Italy (since 2019)
Minister of Social Affairs	Manuela Lanzarin	Liga Veneta
Minister of EU Programs, Tourism and International Trade	Federico Caner	Liga Veneta
Minister of Environment and Civil Protection	Gianpaolo Bottacin	Liga Veneta
Minister of Culture, City Planning and Security	Cristiano Corazzari	Liga Veneta

Source: Region of Veneto — The Regional Government from 1970 until today
