= 1984 European Parliament election in Veneto =

The European Parliament election of 1984 took place on 17 June 1984.

Christian Democracy was the largest party in Veneto with 44.8%, while the Italian Communist Party came distant second with 23.0%

== Results ==
Party	votes	votes (%)
Christian Democracy	1,297,334	44.8
Italian Communist Party	664,266	23.0
Italian Socialist Party	308,187	10.6
Italian Liberal Party–Italian Republican Party	163,610	5.7
Italian Social Movement	114.776	4.0
Italian Democratic Socialist Party	104,541	3.6
Liga Veneta	98,589	3.4
Radical Party	87,534	3.0
Proletarian Democracy	47,371	1.6
Others	7,880	0.3
Total	2,894,088	100.0

Source: Regional Council of Veneto
