= Graziano Girardi =

Italian Venetist politician

Graziano Girardi (Farra di Soligo, 30 May 1940) is an Italian Venetist politician.

An early member of Liga Veneta, he was elected senator in 1983, the first in party's history. After having briefly joined the Union of the Venetian People, he returned into Liga Veneta and, in 1991, he joined the Lega Nord of which he is currently an activist at the local level.
