= Marino Finozzi =

Italian politician

Marino Finozzi (born 28 October 1961 in Thiene) is a Venetist politician from Veneto, Italy.

He joined Liga Veneta in 1986, well before the party was integrated into Lega Nord and was first elected to the Regional Council of Veneto in the 2000 regional election.

Re-elected to the Council in 2005, 2010 and 2015, he was regional minister of Industry and Small Enterprises in Galan II Government, he served as President of the Council from 2005 and 2010, and returned to the regional government as regional minister of Tourism and International Trade in Zaia I Government from 2010 to 2015.
