= Roberto Ciambetti =

Italian politician

Roberto Ciambetti (born 3 July 1965 in Sandrigo) is a Venetist politician from Veneto, Italy.

A member of Liga Veneta–Lega Nord, Ciambetti was secretary of the party from 2003 to 2007 in the province of Vicenza.

Having been elected to the Regional Council of Veneto in 2005, Ciambetti became floor leader of the party in 2008. Re-elected in 2010, he was appointed regional minister of Budget and Local Government in Luca Zaia's first government and, in that position, became one of the closest allies of Zaia.

Re-elected for a third term in 2015, Ciambetti was elected President of the Regional Council of Veneto by a bipartisan vote.

Re-elected for a fourth term in 2020, Ciambetti was also overwhelmingly re-elected President of the Regional Council.
