= Gianluca Forcolin =

Italian politician (born 1968)

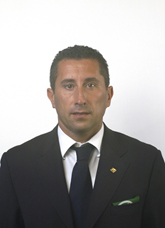
Gianluca Forcolin, 2008

Gianluca Forcolin (born 28 August 1968 in San Donà di Piave) is a Venetist politician from Veneto, Italy.

A member of Liga Veneta–Lega Nord since 1993, Forcolin was long involved in municipal politics in his hometown, Musile di Piave, of which he had been councillor, assessor, deputy mayor and finally mayor from 2007 to 2015. In the 2008 general election he was elected to the Chamber of Deputies, where he sat in the Finance Committee, but did not stand for re-election five years later because he, a Venetist close to Luca Zaia as well as loyal to former Lega Nord leader Umberto Bossi, was not popular with the new leadership led by Flavio Tosi. He was even suspended from the party for ten months by the local leader Daniele Stival.

In 2015, after Tosi was sidelined by the federal party, Forcolin made his comeback: he was elected to the Regional Council as the most voted candidate of Liga Veneta in the province of Venice and Zaia, who had been re-elected President, appointed him vice president and minister of Budget and Local Government.

In the run-up of the 2020 Venetian regional election Forcolin resigned from the Regional Government, after announcing that his accountant office had asked (but not received) a fiscal bonus related to the COVID-19 crisis, a move that was deemed unpopular by the public and President Zaia himself; Forcolin also renounced to run for re-election. After that, Forcolin returned to the political wilderness and was appointed at the head of the Casino of Venice one year later.

In 2023 Forcolin made his second political comeback. First, in May he was permitted by Liga Veneta to run an alternative list named after himself in the municipal election of San Donà di Piave: "United for San Donà — Forcolin Civic List" obtained 11.6% of the vote, just below the tally reached by the mother party (11.9%), and Forcolin a record number of preference votes, opening the way for his appointment in the municipal government. Second, in July Forcolin switched parties and joined Forza Italia, of which Tosi, Forcolin's former rival within Liga Veneta, had been the regional leader since 2022, and became deputy provincial coordinator of the party. In January 2024 he was elected provincial coordinator.
