= Beggiato =

Beggiato is an Italian surname. Notable people with the surname include:

- Ettore Beggiato (born 1954), Italian historian and politician
- Luigi Beggiato (born 1998), Italian Paralympic swimmer
