= 1983 Italian general election in Veneto =

The Italian general election of 1983 took place on 26 June 1983.

In Veneto Christian Democracy was, as usual, the largest party with 42.5% of the vote. Liga Veneta won for the first time seats in the Italian Parliament.

== Results ==
=== Chamber of Deputies ===
Party	votes	votes (%)	seats
Christian Democracy	1,249,075	42.5	21
Italian Communist Party	610,909	20.8	10
Italian Socialist Party	312,722	10.6	5
Italian Republican Party	150,686	5.1	2
Liga Veneta	123,892	4.2	1
Italian Social Movement	122,155	4.2	2
Italian Democratic Socialist Party	107,193	3.6	2
Italian Liberal Party	83,465	2.8	1
Radical Party	72,966	2.5	1
Proletarian Democracy	51,656	1.8	1
National Pensioners' Party	49,424	1.7	-
Others	3,655	0.1	-
Total	2,938,012	100.0	46

Source: Regional Council of Veneto

==== Provincial breakdown ====
Province	DC	PSI	PCI
Verona	45.1	11.1	17.2
Vicenza	52.1	8.1	12.8
Padua	45.5	8.4	20.4
Treviso	44.2	10.0	16.4
Belluno	37.5	12.8	18.4
Venice	31.1	13.7	31.3
Rovigo	34.5	12.7	33.7
Veneto	42.5	10.6	20.8

Source: Regional Council of Veneto

=== Senate ===
Party	votes	votes (%)	seats
Christian Democracy	863,689	41.7	12
Italian Communist Party	474,316	22.9	5
Italian Socialist Party	222,232	10.7	2
Italian Republican Party	102,464	4.9	1
Italian Social Movement	86,028	4.2	1
Italian Democratic Socialist Party	85,528	4.1	1
Liga Veneta	69,456	3.4	1
Italian Liberal Party	61,344	3.0	-
Radical Party	38,666	1.9	-
National Pensioners' Party	38,383	1.9	-
Proletarian Democracy	27,382	1.3	-
Others	1,442	0.1	-
Total	2,070,930	100.0	23

Source: Regional Council of Veneto
