= 1989 European Parliament election in Veneto =

The European Parliament election of 1989 took place on 18 June 1989.

Christian Democracy was the largest party in Veneto with 43.8%, while the Italian Communist Party came distant second with 18.5%.

== Results ==
Party	votes	votes (%)
Christian Democracy	1,272,356	43.8
Italian Communist Party	537,977	18.5
Italian Socialist Party	430,302	14.8
Federation of Green Lists	156,755	5.4
Italian Social Movement	112,175	3.9
Italian Liberal Party–Italian Republican Party	108,226	3.7
Rainbow Greens	93,830	3.2
Italian Democratic Socialist Party	59,346	2.0
Alleanza Nord (incl. Liga Veneta)	49,904	1.7
Anti-Prohibition List	40,499	1.4
Proletarian Democracy	33,387	1.1
Others	12,638	0.4
Total	2,907,395	100.0

Source: Regional Council of Veneto
