= Enrico Cavaliere =

Italian politician

Enrico Cavaliere (Venice, 13 December 1958) is a Venetist politician. He is a member of Liga Veneta-Lega Nord.

He joined Liga Veneta in 1991 and was provincial secretary for the Province of Venice from 1992 to 1994, when he was elected to the Italian Chamber of Deputies. Re-elected in 1996, he was Vice President of the parliamentary group of Lega Nord. In 2000 he left his seat in the Chamber to run for the Regional Council of Veneto and was elected from the regional list. Following the election he was elected President of the assembly and held that office for five years.

After some quarrels with party leadership, he was up for re-election in 2005, but this time he ran in the constituency of Venice, where he was defeated by Daniele Stival in term of preference votes. In late 2005 Cavaliere was even suspended from the party. He was later reintegrated as a full member of the party, but since then he has been only a local activist.
