= 1987 Italian general election in Veneto =

The Italian general election of 1987 took place on 14 June 1987.

In Veneto Christian Democracy was the largest party that got 43.5% of the vote.

== Results ==
=== Chamber of Deputies ===
Party	votes	votes (%)	seats
Christian Democracy	1,358,833	43.5	21
Italian Communist Party	568,827	18.2	9
Italian Socialist Party	446,648	14.3	7
Italian Social Movement	123,123	3.9	1
Green Lists	116,040	3.7	2
Liga Veneta–United Pensioners	96,343	3.1	-
Italian Republican Party	92,811	3.0	1
Radical Party	90,154	2.9	2
Italian Democratic Socialist Party	78,489	2.5	1
Italian Liberal Party	62,842	2.0	1
Proletarian Democracy	55,676	1.8	1
Others	31,010	1.0	-
Total	3,120,796	100.0	46

Source: Regional Council of Veneto

==== Provincial breakdown ====
Province	DC	PSI	PCI
Verona	46.3	14.4	14.5
Vicenza	52.4	11.8	11.1
Padua	47.0	11.9	18.2
Treviso	14.5	15.6	14.0
Belluno	35.5	20.9	16.8
Venice	32.2	15.9	27.5
Rovigo	35.9	13.9	31.8
Veneto	43.5	14.3	18.2

Source: Regional Council of Veneto

=== Senate ===
Party	votes	votes (%)	seats
Christian Democracy	1,155,755	44.0	13
Italian Communist Party	504,310	19.2	5
Italian Socialist Party	378,246	14.4	4
Italian Social Movement	104,029	4.0	1
Liga Veneta–United Pensioners	85,480	3.3	-
Italian Republican Party	81,335	3.1	-
Green Lists	79,240	3.0	-
Italian Democratic Socialist Party	71,965	2.7	-
Radical Party	63,547	2.4	-
Italian Liberal Party	54,129	2.1	-
Proletarian Democracy	41,102	1.6	-
Others	4,734	0.2	-
Total	2,623,872	100.0	23

Source: Regional Council of Veneto
