= Federico Caner =

Italian politician

Federico Caner (born 8 November 1973 in Treviso) is a Venetist politician from Veneto, Italy.

A member of Liga Veneta–Lega Nord since 1993, he was first elected to the Regional Council of Veneto in 2000 and then re-elected in 2005 and 2010 (when he obtained more votes than any other candidate in the province of Treviso). From 2010 to 2015 he was floor leader of his party in the Council.

In 2015 he did not stand for re-election, but was later appointed regional minister of EU Programs, Tourism and International Trade in Luca Zaia's second government.

In 2020 Caner was elected to the Regional Council and appointed regional minister of EU Programs, Agriculture, Tourism and International Trade in Zaia's third government.
