= Elisa De Berti =

Italian politician

Elisa De Berti (Bovolone, 22 October 1974) is a Venetist politician from Veneto, Italy.

She was a member of Forza Italia and then a member of Liga Veneta–Lega Nord, De Berti was elected mayor of Isola Rizza in 2009 and re-elected in 2014.

After the 2015 regional election, even though she had been an unsuccessful candidate in the province of Verona, she was appointed regional minister of Public Works, Infrastructures and Transports in Luca Zaia's second government. In the 2020 regional election De Berti was elected to the Regional Council from the province of Verona. Subsequently, she was appointed vice president and minister of Legal Affairs, Public Works, Infrastructures and Transports in Zaia's third government.
