= Third Zaia government =

Cabinet of Veneto, Italy (2020-2025)

The third Zaia government, led by president Luca Zaia, was the 19th government of Veneto and was in office from 16 October 2020 to 5 December 2025.

Third Zaia government
Office	Name	Party
President	Luca Zaia	Liga Veneta
Vice President	Elisa De Berti	Liga Veneta
Minister of Legal Affairs, Public Works, Infrastructures and Transports	Elisa De Berti	Liga Veneta
Minister of Planning, Budget, Patrimony and Local Government	Francesco Calzavara	Liga Veneta
Minister of Health, Social Affairs and Social Programs	Manuela Lanzarin	Liga Veneta
Minister of Economic Development, Energy and Special Status for Venice	Roberto Marcato	Liga Veneta
Minister of EU Programs, Agriculture, Tourism and International Trade	Federico Caner	Liga Veneta
Minister of Education, Formation, Labour and Equal Opportunities	Elena Donazzan(until 19 July 2024)	Brothers of Italy
Minister of Education, Formation, Labour and Equal Opportunities	Valeria Mantovan (since 17 September 2024)	Brothers of Italy
Minister of Environment, Climate and Civil Protection	Gianpaolo Bottacin	Liga Veneta
Minister of Culture, City Planning, Security, Hunting and Fishing	Cristiano Corazzari	Liga Veneta

Source: Region of Veneto — The Regional Government from 1970 until today
