= First Zaia government =

The first Zaia government, led by president Luca Zaia, was the 17th government of Veneto and was in office from 10 April 2010 to 28 June 2015.

First Zaia Government
Office	Name	Party
President	Luca Zaia	LV
Vice President	Marino Zorzato	PdL/NCD
Minister of Budget and Local Government	Roberto Ciambetti	LV
Minister of Health	Luca Coletto	LV
Minister of Economic Development (also minister of Infrastructures since October 2014)	Maria Luisa Coppola	PdL/FI (Note: In November 2013 The People of Freedom (PdL) was transformed into Forza Italia (FI); a group of dissidents formed the New Centre-Right (NCD).)
Minister of Infrastructures and Transports	Renato Chisso (until June 2014)	PdL/FI
Minister of Public Works, Energy and Security	Massimo Giorgetti	PdL/FI
Minister of Agriculture	Franco Manzato	LV
Minister of Education and Labour (also minister of Transports since October 2014)	Elena Donazzan	PdL/FI
Minister of Social Affairs	Remo Sernagiotto (until June 2014); Davide Bendinelli (since October 2014)	PdL/FI; FI
Minister of Tourism and International Trade	Marino Finozzi	LV
Minister of Environment	Maurizio Conte	LV/LTV
Minister of Venetian Identity and Civil Protection	Daniele Stival	LV/LTV (Note: In March 2015 a group of splinters from Liga Veneta (LV) formed the Tosi List for Veneto (LTV).)
Minister of Culture and City Planning	Marino Zorzato	PdL/NCD

Source: Region of Veneto — The Regional Government from 1970 until today
