= Gianantonio Da Re =

Italian politician (born 1953)

Gianantonio Da Re MEP
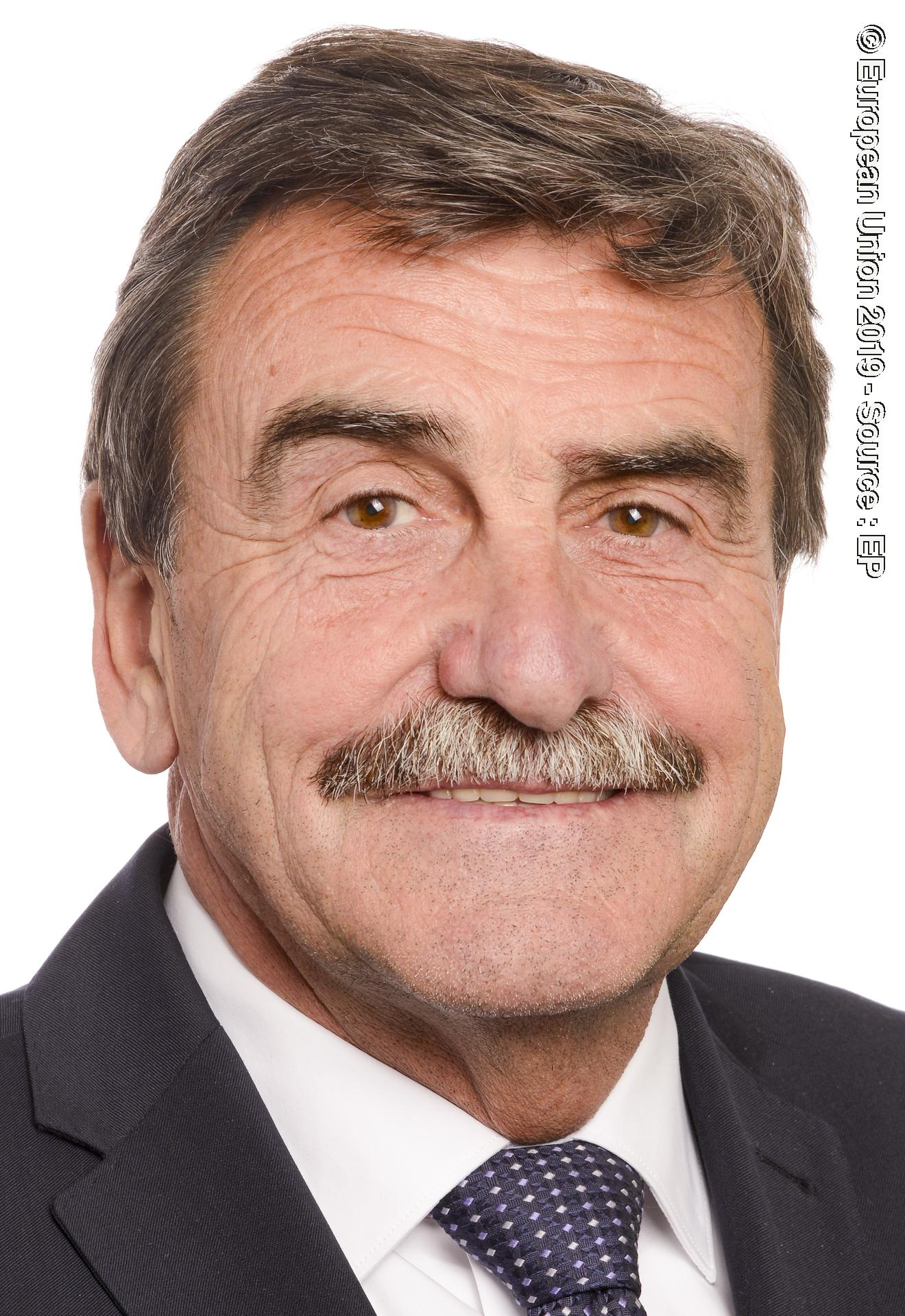

Member of the European Parliament for North-East Italy
- Incumbent
- Assumed office 2 July 2019

Personal details
- Party: League

Gianantonio Da Re (born 6 September 1953) is an Italian politician. Born in Cappella Maggiore, he has been the mayor of Vittorio Veneto. He was elected as a member of the European Parliament in the 2019 European Parliament election in Italy.
