= Veneto Autonomous Region Movement =

Veneto Autonomous Region Movement Movimento Veneto Regione Autonoma
- Founded: 1987
- Dissolved: 2000
- Split from: Liga Veneta
- Merged into: Liga Veneta Repubblica
- Ideology: Regionalism; Venetian nationalism

The Veneto Autonomous Region Movement (Movimento Veneto Regione Autonoma, MVRA) was a Venetist political party active in Veneto.

MVRA was launched in 1987 by two groups of splinters from Liga Veneta, one led by Geppino and Umberto Vecchiato and the other by Giulio Pizzati who had launched Liga Federativa Veneta (LFV) in 1983. The party included also Flaminio De Poli, who had been one of the most outspoken independentist figures in Veneto so far and who had been particularly critical of the alliance between Liga Veneta and Lega Lombarda.

In the 1992 general election MVRA gained 1.5% of the regional vote.

By 2000 the party was merged into Liga Veneta Repubblica (LVR). Pizzati's son, Lodovico, would later form other Venetist parties.

== Sources ==
- Francesco Jori, Dalla Łiga alla Lega. Storia, movimenti, protagonisti, Marsilio, Venice 2009
- Ezio Toffano, Short History of the Venetian Autonomism, Raixe Venete
