= 1996 Italian general election in Veneto =

The Italian general election of 1996 took place on 21 April 1996. In Veneto the election was narrowly won by the centre-left Olive Tree coalition, which won also nationally, but Liga Veneta–Lega Nord was the most voted party in the region: 32.8% in single-seat constituencies and 29.3% among party lists.

== Results ==
=== Chamber of Deputies ===
Coalition	Single-seat constituencies			Proportional system					Total
Coalition	votes	votes (%)	seats	Party	votes	votes (%)	seats	tot.	seats
The Olive Tree–Progressives–LAV	1,061,861	33.8	15	Democratic Party of the Left	374,836	11.8	1	4	19
The Olive Tree–Progressives–LAV	1,061,861	33.8	15	Italian People's Party-UD-PRI-SVP-Prodi	257,552	8.1	1	4	19
The Olive Tree–Progressives–LAV	1,061,861	33.8	15	Communist Refoundation Party	166,793	5.3	1	4	19
The Olive Tree–Progressives–LAV	1,061,861	33.8	15	Italian Renewal-Socialists-Patto	165,675	5.2	1	4	19
The Olive Tree–Progressives–LAV	1,061,861	33.8	15	Federation of the Greens	79,394	2.5	-	4	19
Lega Nord	1,031,223	32.8	15	Lega Nord	928,033	29.3	4	4	19
Pole of Freedoms	1,015,697	32.3	7	Forza Italia	542,488	17.1	2	5	12
Pole of Freedoms	1,015,697	32.3	7	National Alliance	371,207	11.7	2	5	12
Pole of Freedoms	1,015,697	32.3	7	CCD-CDU	171,711	5.4	1	5	12
Pole of Freedoms	1,015,697	32.3	7	Pannella–Sgarbi List	29,942	1.0	-	5	12
North-East Union	9,996	0.3	-	North-East Union	63,934	2.0	-	-	-
Tricolour Flame	4,459	0.1	-	Tricolour Flame	9,780	0.3	-	-	-
Others	20,302	0.6	-	others	9,490	0.3	-	-	-
Total coalitions	3,141,181	100.0	37	Total parties	3,170,835	100.0	13	13	50

Source: Regional Council of Veneto

==== Provincial breakdown ====
Province	AN	FI	LV	PPI	PDS
Verona	14.7	17.3	25.7	8.7	9.8
Vicenza	10.0	14.1	36.1	9.0	7.3
Padua	13.7	16.5	23.6	9.6	12.4
Treviso	9.1	16.7	41.9	7.5	8.7
Belluno	7.9	18.9	41.4	6.0	7.8
Venice	10.9	19.8	22.2	6.2	18.3
Rovigo	13.7	17.6	13.2	8.2	21.3
Veneto	11.7	17.1	29.2	8.1	11.8

Source: Regional Council of Veneto

=== Senate ===
Coalition	Single-seat constituencies			PR	Total
Coalition	votes	votes (%)	seats	seats	seats
The Olive Tree–Progressives–LAV	938,606	33.9	8	2	10
Pole of Freedoms	840,404	30.4	1	3	4
Lega Nord	839,339	30.3	8	1	9
North-East Union	72,541	2.6	-	-	-
Tricolour Flame	39,096	1.4	-	-	-
Others	38,257	1.4	-	-	-
Total coalitions	2,768,243	100.0	17	6	23

Source: Regional Council of Veneto
