= Giuseppe Covre =

Italian politician (1950–2020)

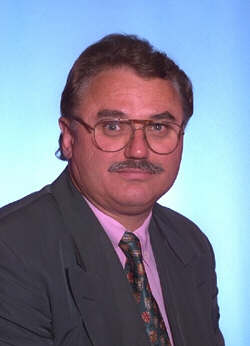
Giuseppe Covre in 1996

Giuseppe Covre (3 April 1950 – 24 March 2020) was an Italian politician.

He was an Oderzo native, born on 3 April 1950 in Fontanelle, Veneto.

He was a member of Lega Nord, and represented the party throughout his political career, which began in 1990, when he was elected municipal councillor of Motta di Livenza. He was subsequently twice elected mayor of Oderzo, in 1993 and 1997, and was the first mayor since the fascist era ended to not be affiliated with Christian Democracy. As mayor, Covre worked closely with other municipal leaders, among them Giorgio Lago and Massimo Cacciari. Covre backed autonomy for the region, but often went against his party. This led to Covre being described as a "heretic", a nickname he accepted. Covre was elected to the Chamber of Deputies in 1996, and served a single term, until 2001. He declined to run for a second parliamentary term. Term-limited as mayor, Covre chose to run for the Oderzo municipal council, and won. From 2002, he was also a Treviso provincial councillor. Covre contested the Oderzo mayoralty again in 2006, losing to Pietro Dalla Libera. He was expelled from Lega Nord for his support of the 2016 Italian constitutional referendum.

Covre died on 24 March 2020, aged 69, from COVID-19.
