= Cristiano Corazzari =

Italian politician

Cristiano Corazzari (born 9 November 1975 in Ferrara) is a Venetist politician from Veneto, Italy.

A member of Liga Veneta–Lega Nord since 1992, Corazzari was long active in municipal politics in his hometown, Stienta. In the 2010 regional election he was elected to the Regional Council of Veneto, but stepped down in 2014 upon his successful bid to become mayor of Stienta.

After the 2015 regional election, Corazzari returned to regional politics as minister of Culture, City Planning and Security in Luca Zaia's second government.

In 2020 Corazzari was elected to the Regional Council and appointed regional minister of Culture, City Planning, Security, Hunting and Fishing in Zaia's third government.
