= 2018 Italian general election in Veneto =

The Italian general election of 2018 took place on 4 March 2018.

In Veneto the centre-right coalition (48.1%), dominated by the Lega (Liga Veneta), obtained a resounding victory, being largely ahead of the Five Star Movement (24.4%) and the centre-left coalition (20.3%). The Lega (32.2%) was largely the largest party, followed by the Five Star Movement (24.4%), the Democratic Party (16.7%) and Forza Italia (10.6%). Under the new electoral system, which re-introduced single-seat constituencies, the centre-right won all such constituencies.

== Results ==
Chamber of Deputies

Coalition	Party	Proportional			First-past-the-post			Total seats
Coalition	Party	Votes	%	Seats	Votes	%	Seats	Total seats
Centre-right coalition	Lega (incl. Liga Veneta)	918,985	32.2	11	1,373,372	48.1	12	23
Centre-right coalition	Forza Italia (incl. VpA)	302,879	10.6	3	1,373,372	48.1	6	9
Centre-right coalition	Brothers of Italy	119,770	4.2	2	1,373,372	48.1	1	3
Centre-right coalition	Us with Italy	31,738	1.1	-	1,373,372	48.1	-	-
Centre-right coalition				16			19	35
Five Star Movement		696,741	24.4	8	696,741	24.4	-	8
Centre-left coalition	Democratic Party	477,025	16.7	7	579,897	20.3	-	7
Centre-left coalition	More Europe	77,344	2.7	-	579,897	20.3	-	-
Centre-left coalition	Together	14,234	0.5	-	579,897	20.3	-	-
Centre-left coalition	Popular Civic List	11,294	0.4	-	579,897	20.3	-	-
Centre-left coalition				7			-	7
Free and Equal		77,623	2.7	-	77,623	2.7	-	-
The People of the Family		30,233	1.1	-	30,233	1.1	-	-
Casa Pound Italy		28,078	1.0	-	28,078	1.0	-	-
Others		71,646	2.5	-	71,646	2.5	-	-
Total		2,856,590	100.0	31	2,856,590	100.0	19	50

Sources: Ministry of the Interior, Corriere del Veneto

Senate

Coalition	Party	Proportional			First-past-the-post			Total seats
Coalition	Party	Votes	%	Seats	Votes	%	Seats	Total seats
Centre-right coalition	Lega (incl. Liga Veneta)	839,586	31.8	5	1,272,555	48.2	4	9
Centre-right coalition	Forza Italia (incl. VpA)	286,906	10.9	2	1,272,555	48.2	3	5
Centre-right coalition	Brothers of Italy	113,108	4.3	1	1,272,555	48.2	1	2
Centre-right coalition	Us with Italy	32,955	1.2	-	1,272,555	48.2	1	1
Centre-right coalition				8			9	17
Five Star Movement		647,960	24.5	4	647,960	24.5	-	4
Centre-left coalition	Democratic Party	450,230	17.0	3	539,398	20.4	-	3
Centre-left coalition	More Europe	66,970	2.5	-	539,398	20.4	-	-
Centre-left coalition	Together	12,709	0.5	-	539,398	20.4	-	-
Centre-left coalition	Popular Civic List	9,489	0.4	-	539,398	20.4	-	-
Centre-left coalition				3			-	3
Free and Equal		66,813	2.5	-	66,813	2.5	-	-
The People of the Family		28,593	1.1	-	28,593	1.1	-	-
Casa Pound Italy		22,619	0.9	-	22,619	0.9	-	-
Others		63,525	2.4	-	63,525	2.4	-	-
Total		2,641,463	100.0	15	2,641,463	100.0	9	24

Sources: Ministry of the Interior, Corriere della Sera
