= Luciano Gasperini =

Italian politician

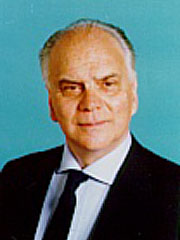
Luciano Gasperini

Luciano Gasperini (Lonigo, 15 June 1935) is an Italian Venetist politician.

He has been senator for Northern League–Venetian League from 1996 to 2001 and chairman of the party's group from 1999 to 2000. In 1999 he was the Northern League's candidate for the post of President of the Italian Republic. In 1999 and 2004 he was candidate for Mayor of Padua. In 2002–2005 he was federal president of the party and from 2004 to 2006 he served as Undersecretary for regional affairs in Silvio Berlusconi's governments.

Gasperini is also known for having been the defendant in trial of Serenissimi.
