= Luca Coletto =

Italian politician (born 1961)

Luca Coletto (born 27 May 1961 in Verona) is a Venetist politician from Veneto, Italy.

A member of Liga Veneta–Lega Nord since 1995, Coletto was minister of the Environment and vice president of the Province of Verona between 2004 and 2010. After the 2010 regional election, in which he did not stand as candidate, he became regional minister of Health in Zaia I Government.

Coletto was once a close ally of Flavio Tosi, who imposed his name for minister of Health in 2010, but later became an ally of Luca Zaia.

In the 2015 regional election Coletto was elected to the Regional Council of Veneto and, after the election, was confirmed as minister of Health in Zaia II Government. He resigned in 2018 in order to become undersecretary of Health in Conte I Cabinet. After the fall of the latter government in 2019, he was appointed regional minister of Health in Umbria by President Donatella Tesei and health spokesman of the League by secretary Matteo Salvini.
