= Roberto Marcato =

Italian politician (born 1968)

Roberto Marcato (born 18 July 1968 in Castelfranco Veneto) is a Venetist politician from Veneto, Italy.

A member of Liga Veneta–Lega Nord since 1992, Marcato was soon involved in municipal politics in his hometown, Piombino Dese. In the 2004 provincial election he was elected for the first time to the Provincial Council of Padua and served, successively, as provincial minister of the Environment and vice president.

In 2012 Marcato, an ardent Venetist, supporter of Luca Zaia, close ally of Massimo Bitonci and loyal to former Lega Nord leader Umberto Bossi, was also elected provincial secretary of Liga Veneta, making Padua the only province of Veneto where the old guard held, but soon started to clash with the party's new national secretary, Flavio Tosi. In this respect, Marcato was twice suspended by Tosi from his role and came very close to being ejected from the party altogether.

In 2014 Marcato was instrumental in Bitonci's successful bid to become mayor of Padua and, after the election, he was elected president of the municipal council.

In the 2015 regional election, which came after Tosi had been sidelined from the federal party, Marcato was elected to the Regional Council of Veneto and, after the election, was appointed regional minister of Economic Development and Energy in Zaia's second government, thus resigning from Padua's municipal council.

Re-elected in the 2020 regional election, Marcato was appointed regional minister of Economic Development, Energy and Special Status for Venice in Zaia's third government. During this time, he fell out with Bitonci and, in the run-up of the party's 2023 regional congress, he led the challenge of traditional wing, before retiring from the race.
