= 1990 Venetian regional election =

Italian regional election

The Venetian regional election of 1990 took place on 6 and 7 May 1990.

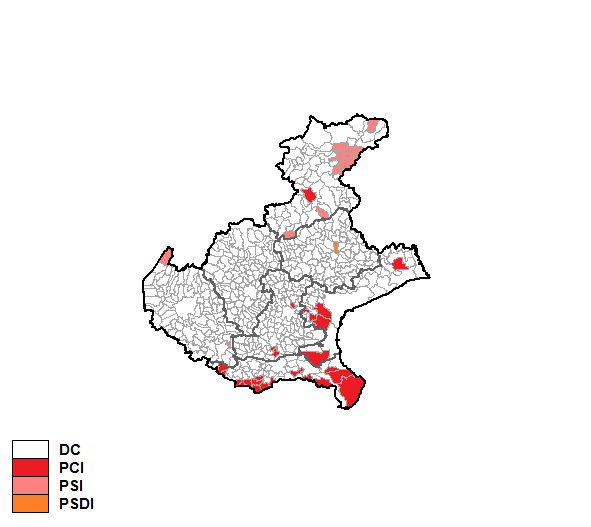
Largest party by municipality

== Events ==
Christian Democracy was by far the largest party, but it was four seats short of an outright majority in the Regional Council. The Greens and the regionalist parties did surprisingly well.

After the election Christian Democrat Franco Cremonese formed a government comprising the Italian Socialist Party, the Italian Republican Party and the Italian Democratic Socialist Party. The government fell in 1992 in the verge of Tangentopoli scandals and was replaced by a succession of governments, which included both Venetian League and the Democratic Party of the Left, the successor party of the Communists.

== Results ==
Party	votes	votes (%)	seats
Christian Democracy	1,294,996	42.4	27
Italian Communist Party	475,342	15.6	10
Italian Socialist Party	419,087	13.7	8
Greens (Green List + Rainbow Greens)	217,440	7.1	4
Northern League – Venetian League	180,676	5.9	3
Italian Social Movement	83,225	2.7	1
Italian Republican Party	77,932	2.6	1
Italian Democratic Socialist Party	65,424	2.1	1
Union of the Venetian People	58,093	1.9	1
Italian Liberal Party	48,767	1.6	1
Hunting Fishing Environment	47,289	1.5	1
Antiprohibitionists on Drugs	33,974	1.1	1
Civic Initiative	16,235	0.9	1
Proletarian Democracy	25,720	0.8	-
The Common Man	1,406	0.0	-
Total	3,055,606	100.0	60

Source: Regional Council of Veneto
