= Gianpaolo Bottacin =

Italian politician

Gianpaolo Bottacin (born 17 October 1969 in Feltre) is a Venetist politician from Veneto, Italy.

A member of Liga Veneta–Lega Nord since 1993, Bottacin was elected to the Regional Council of Veneto in 2005. Between 2008 and 2009 he was floor leader of the party. In 2009 he was elected President of the Province of Belluno and, consequently, left his seat in the Council. In 2011, however, he suffered a vote of no confidence, was forced to resign and entered a period of political inactivity, also due to clashes with Flavio Tosi's leadership of Liga Veneta.

In 2015, after Tosi was sidelined by the federal party, Bottacin made a comeback in regional politics: he was elected to the Regional Council from Luca Zaia's personal list and Zaia, who had been re-elected President, appointed him regional minister of the Environment and Civil Protection in his second government.

In the 2020 regional election Bottacin was re-elected from Zaia's personal list by a record of over 9,000 preference votes in the scarcely populated province of Belluno and was appointed regional minister of the Environment, Climate and Civil Protection in Zaia's third government.
