= Mara Bizzotto =

Italian politician

Mara Bizzotto MEP
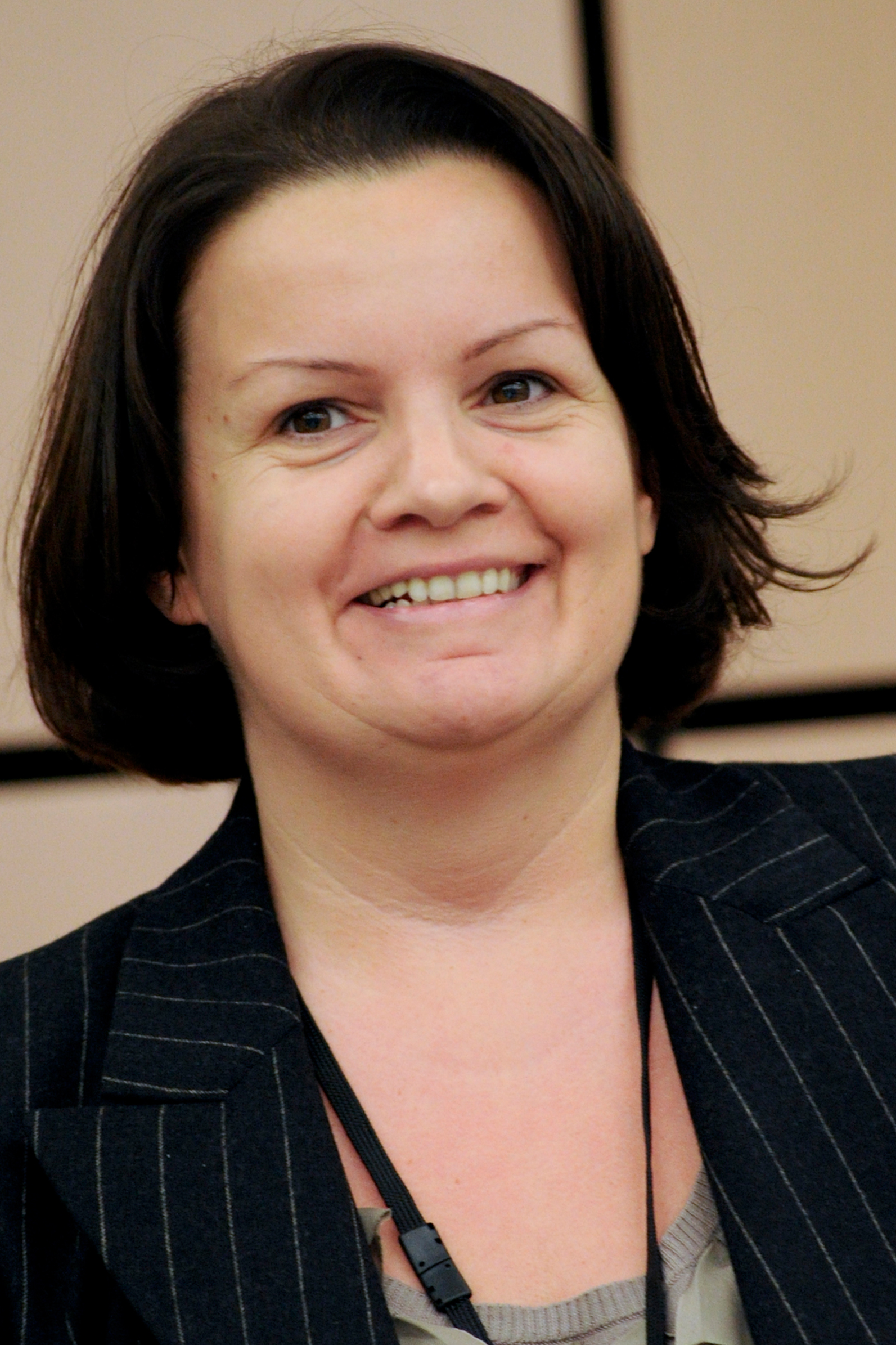

Personal details
- Born: 3 September 1972 (age 53) Bassano del Grappa, Italy
- Party: League
- Profession: Senator, former European Parliament member, politician

Mara Bizzotto (Bassano del Grappa, 3 June 1972) is an Italian politician and was a European Parliament member.

She was a member of the Regional Council of Veneto from 2000 to 2005 and then, again, from 2006 to 2009, when she was elected to the European Parliament. She was re-elected in 2014 and 2019. Bizzotto was elected a League senator for Veneto after the 2022 general election.
