= 2006 Italian general election in Veneto =

The Italian general election of 2006 took place on 10–11 April 2006. The election was won in Veneto by the centre-right House of Freedoms coalition by a landslide in an election narrowly won by the centre-left The Union at the national level.

== Results ==
=== Chamber of Deputies ===
Coalition leader	votes	votes (%)	seats	Party	votes	votes (%)	seats
Silvio Berlusconi	1,789,452	56.3	26	Forza Italia	779,602	24.5	12
Silvio Berlusconi	1,789,452	56.3	26	National Alliance	358,648	11.3	5
Silvio Berlusconi	1,789,452	56.3	26	Lega Nord	353,284	11.1	5
Silvio Berlusconi	1,789,452	56.3	26	Union of Christian and Centre Democrats	247,327	7.8	4
Silvio Berlusconi	1,789,452	56.3	26	Social Alternative	18,968	0.6	-
Silvio Berlusconi	1,789,452	56.3	26	Christian Democracy–Socialist Party	16,088	0.5	-
Silvio Berlusconi	1,789,452	56.3	26	others	15,535	0.5	-
Romano Prodi	1,236,161	40.4	23	The Olive Tree: Democracy is Freedom – The Daisy; Democrats of the Left	848,830	26.7	16
Romano Prodi	1,236,161	40.4	23	Communist Refoundation Party	124,081	3.9	2
Romano Prodi	1,236,161	40.4	23	Italy of Values	69,870	2.2	2
Romano Prodi	1,236,161	40.4	23	Rose in the Fist: Italian Democratic Socialists; Italian Radicals	68,876	2.2	2
Romano Prodi	1,236,161	40.4	23	Federation of the Greens	59,301	1.9	1
Romano Prodi	1,236,161	40.4	23	Party of Italian Communists	45,197	1.4	-
Romano Prodi	1,236,161	40.4	23	Liga Fronte Veneto	22,010	0.7	-
Romano Prodi	1,236,161	40.4	23	Pensioners' Party	21,048	0.7	-
Romano Prodi	1,236,161	40.4	23	Populars–UDEUR	14,743	0.5	-
Romano Prodi	1,236,161	40.4	23	others	6,225	0.2	-
Giorgio Panto	86,824	2.7	-	North-East Project	86,824	2.7	-
Others	7,181	0.2	-	others	7,181	0.2	-
Total coalitions	3,184,017	100.0	49	Total parties	3,184,017	100.0	49

Source: Regional Council of Veneto

=== Senate ===
Coalition leader	votes	votes (%)	seats	Party	votes	votes (%)	seats
Silvio Berlusconi	1,673,791	57.1	14	Forza Italia	720,749	24.6	6
Silvio Berlusconi	1,673,791	57.1	14	National Alliance	336,374	11.5	3
Silvio Berlusconi	1,673,791	57.1	14	Lega Nord	321,992	11.0	3
Silvio Berlusconi	1,673,791	57.1	14	Union of Christian and Centre Democrats	231,240	7.9	2
Silvio Berlusconi	1,673,791	57.1	14	Social Alternative	16,229	0.5	-
Silvio Berlusconi	1,673,791	57.1	14	Christian Democracy–Socialist Party	15,415	0.5	-
Silvio Berlusconi	1,673,791	57.1	14	Tricolour Flame	14,375	0.5	-
Silvio Berlusconi	1,673,791	57.1	14	others	17,417	0.6	-
Romano Prodi	1,158,534	39.6	10	Democracy is Freedom – The Daisy	348,670	11.9	4
Romano Prodi	1,158,534	39.6	10	Democrats of the Left	336,278	11.5	4
Romano Prodi	1,158,534	39.6	10	Communist Refoundation Party	144,502	4.9	1
Romano Prodi	1,158,534	39.6	10	Together with the Union: Federation of the Greens; Party of Italian Communists	111,417	3.8	1
Romano Prodi	1,158,534	39.6	10	Italy of Values	83,931	2.9	-
Romano Prodi	1,158,534	39.6	10	Rose in the Fist: Italian Democratic Socialists; Italian Radicals	61,527	2.1	-
Romano Prodi	1,158,534	39.6	10	Pensioners' Party	23,446	0.8	-
Romano Prodi	1,158,534	39.6	10	Liga Fronte Veneto	23,208	0.8	-
Romano Prodi	1,158,534	39.6	10	Populars–UDEUR	14,723	0.5	-
Romano Prodi	1,158,534	39.6	10	others	10,832	0.4	-
Giorgio Panto	87,601	3.0	-	North-East Project	87,601	3.0	-
Others	11,293	0.3	-	others	11,293	0.3	-
Total coalitions	2,931,210	100.0	24	Total parties	2,931,210	100.0	24

Source: Regional Council of Veneto
