= Franco Manzato =

Italian politician

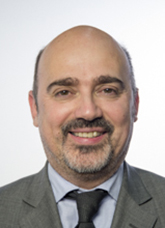

Member of the Chamber of Deputies
- Incumbent
- Assumed office 23 March 2018

Personal details
- Born: 19 May 1966 (age 60) Oderzo, Italy
- Party: Lega Nord
- Education: Ca' Foscari University
- Profession: Politician, Business consultant

Franco Manzato (born 19 May 1966 in Oderzo) is a Venetist politician. He is a member of Liga Veneta–Lega Nord.

== Biography ==
After a degree in philosophy, Manzato began to work as a consultant for small and medium-sized enterprises and joined Liga Veneta in 1984, seven years before the foundation of Lega Nord. In the 2000 regional election, he was elected to the Regional Council of Veneto. He was then re-elected in 2005 and was party leader in the Council from 2002 through 2008, when he became regional minister of Agriculture and Tourism in Galan III Government, replacing Luca Zaia. Re-elected in 2010, he was appointed regional minister of Agriculture in Zaia I Government.

In 2018, Manzato was elected to the Chamber of Deputies, and he has been appointed Undersecretary for agricultural, food and forestry policies in the Conte Cabinet.
