= 2019 European Parliament election in Veneto =

The European Parliament election of 2019 took place in Italy on 26 May 2019.

In Veneto Lega Nord came first with 49.9% of the vote (country-level result 34.3%) and more than 20pp than the Democratic Party, which came second with 18.9%. The Five Star Movement came third with 8.9%, ahead of Brothers of Italy (6.8%), Forza Italia (6.1%), Green Europe (2.7%), More Europe (2.7%) and The Left (1.1%).

== Results ==
Party	Votes	%
Lega Nord	1,234,610	49.9
Democratic Party	468,789	18.9
Five Star Movement	220,429	8.9
Brothers of Italy	167,394	6.8
Forza Italia	149,636	6.1
Green Europe	67,846	2.7
More Europe	67,342	2.7
The Left	25,981	1.1
others	73,121	3.0
Total	2,475,148	100.00

Source: Ministry of the Interior
