= Lega Autonomia Veneta =

Venetian Autonomy League Lega Autonomia Veneta
- Leader: Mario Rigo
- Founded: 1989
- Dissolved: 2001
- Ideology: Autonomism; Venetian nationalism
- Political position: Centre-left

The Lega Autonomia Veneta (Venetian Autonomy League, LAV) was a centre-left regionalist political party in Veneto.

== History ==
The party's long-standing leaders were Mario Rigo, a former Mayor of Venice (1975–1985) and MEP (1984–1989) for the Italian Socialist Party, and incumbent Senator, and Oscar De Bona, Socialist President of the Province of Belluno since 1990.

In the 1990 regional election the party, at time called Iniziativa Civica ("Civic Initiative") won 0.9% of the vote, but, as Liga Veneta–Lega Nord boomed in the early 1990s, the party changed its name into Lega Autonomia Veneta, with a very small word "Autonomia", and its symbol into former Liga's symbol the lion of Saint Mark. The LAV increased its share of votes, gaining 5-6% of the vote in Senate elections. Rigo was elected for the party to the Chamber of Deputies (along with Pierluigi Ronzani to the Senate) in 1992 and to the Senate in 1996 (in coalition with The Olive Tree). De Bona was re-elected President of the Province of Belluno for LAV and Dolomitic Agreement in 1995 and 1999, prior to joining the New Italian Socialist Party and the centre-right House of Freedoms.

In 1997 LAV was merged, at the regional level, with the Northeast Movement of Massimo Cacciari, while, at the national level, it became the League of Regions. The Movement of Cacciari was merged into The Democrats in 1999 and the League of Rigo disappeared by 2001.

== Popular support ==
The electoral results of the party in Veneto are shown in the table below. For general elections the results refer to the Senate election.

1990 regional	1992 general	1994 general	1994 European	1995 regional	1996 general	1999 European
0.9	5.0	6.0	1.2	2.9	-	0.3

== Sources ==
- Francesco Jori, Dalla Łiga alla Lega. Storia, movimenti, protagonisti, Marsilio, Venice 2009
- Ezio Toffano, Short History of the Venetian Autonomism, Raixe Venete
