= 2009 European Parliament election in Veneto =

The European Parliament election of 2009 took place on 6–7 June 2009.

The People of Freedom (29.3%) and Lega Nord (28.4%) were tied at the top in Veneto, while the Democratic Party (20.3%) was a distant third.

== Results ==
Party	votes	votes (%)
The People of Freedom	792,830	29.3
Lega Nord	767,088	28.4
Democratic Party	548,501	20.3
Italy of Values	194,530	7.2
Union of the Centre	172,077	6.4
Bonino-Pannella List	66,284	2.5
Anticapitalist List (PRC–PdCI)	49,075	1.8
Left and Freedom (MpS–Greens–PS)	42,074	1.6
Others	70,044	2.6
Total	651,327	100.0

Source: Regional Council of Veneto
