= Daniele Stival =

Italian politician

Daniele Stival (born 2 September 1962, in Pramaggiore) is an Italian Venetist politician.

A member of Liga Veneta–Lega Nord, he was first elected to the Regional Council of Veneto in 2000. Since 2001 Stival has been also secretary of the party for eastern Veneto. Re-elected for the third time to the Council in 2010, he was appointed regional minister of Venetian Identity in Zaia I Government.
