= 1985 Venetian regional election =

Italian regional election

The Venetian regional election of 1985 took place on 12 May 1985.

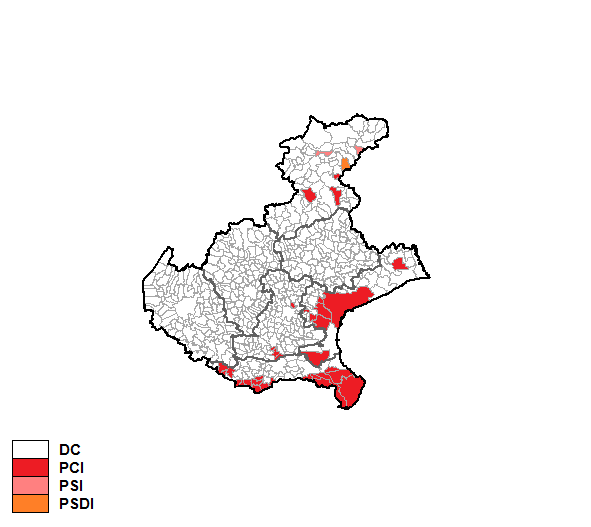
Largest party by municipality

== Events ==
Christian Democracy was by far the largest party, but for the first time since 1970 it was not able to secure an outright majority. The Venetian League, which would have become a stable political force in the Region, entered for the first time the Regional Council with two regional deputies.

After the election Christian Democrat Carlo Bernini, the incumbent President of the Region, formed a government comprising also the Italian Socialist Party, the Italian Democratic Socialist Party and the Italian Liberal Party. In 1989 Bernini, appointed minister in Andreotti VI Cabinet, was replaced by Franco Cremonese, another Christian Democrat.

== Results ==
Party	votes	votes (%)	seats
Christian Democracy	1,383,406	45.9	30
Italian Communist Party	615,002	20.4	12
Italian Socialist Party	372,096	12.4	8
Italian Social Movement	135,417	4.5	2
Venetian League	112,275	3.7	2
Italian Republican Party	98,306	3.3	2
Italian Democratic Socialist Party	96,571	3.2	1
Green List	77,967	2.6	1
Italian Liberal Party	57,648	1.9	1
Proletarian Democracy	51,254	1.7	1
Pensioners' National Party	7,036	0.2	-
Liga Veneta Serenissima	6,533	0.2	-
Total	3,013,511	100.0	60

Source: Regional Council of Veneto
