= Union of the Venetian People =

Union of the Venetian People Union del Popoło Vèneto
- Leader: Ettore Beggiato; Gianni Butturini
- Founded: 1987
- Dissolved: 1995
- Split from: Liga Veneta
- Merged into: Liga Veneta
- Ideology: Autonomism; Venetian nationalism
- Political position: Catch-all party

The Union of the Venetian People (Union del Popoło Vèneto, UPV) was a Venetist political party active in Veneto.

== History ==
The party was founded in 1987 by splinters from Liga Veneta led by Ettore Beggiato and Gianni Butturini. In the 1990 regional election UPV won 1.9% of the vote (compared to the 5.9% of Liga Veneta) and Beggiato was re-elected to the Regional Council of Veneto. Occasionally the party surpassed Liga Veneta: in 1991 local elections UPV gained 3.5% of the vote against 2.6% of Liga Veneta. The party was merged into Liga Veneta in 1995, after that Franco Rocchetta and Marilena Marin, who expelled Beggiato from that party in 1987, had been expelled too.

== Sources ==
- Joei, Francesco; prefazione di Ilvo Diamanti (2009). Dalla Łiga alla Lega : storia, movimenti, protagonisti (1. ed.). Venezia: Marsilio. ISBN 9788831798600.
- Ezio Toffano, Short History of the Venetian Autonomism, Raixe Venete
- Furio Gallina, "Die venezianischen Lega – Bewegungen von den Anfängen bis zur Entstehung der Lega Nord", in Verschiedene Autoren, «Jeder für sich oder alle gemeinsam in Europa? Die Debatte über Identität, Wohlstand und die institutionellen Grundlagen der Union», Nomos, Baden-Baden, 2013.
