= Marilena Marin =

Italian politician

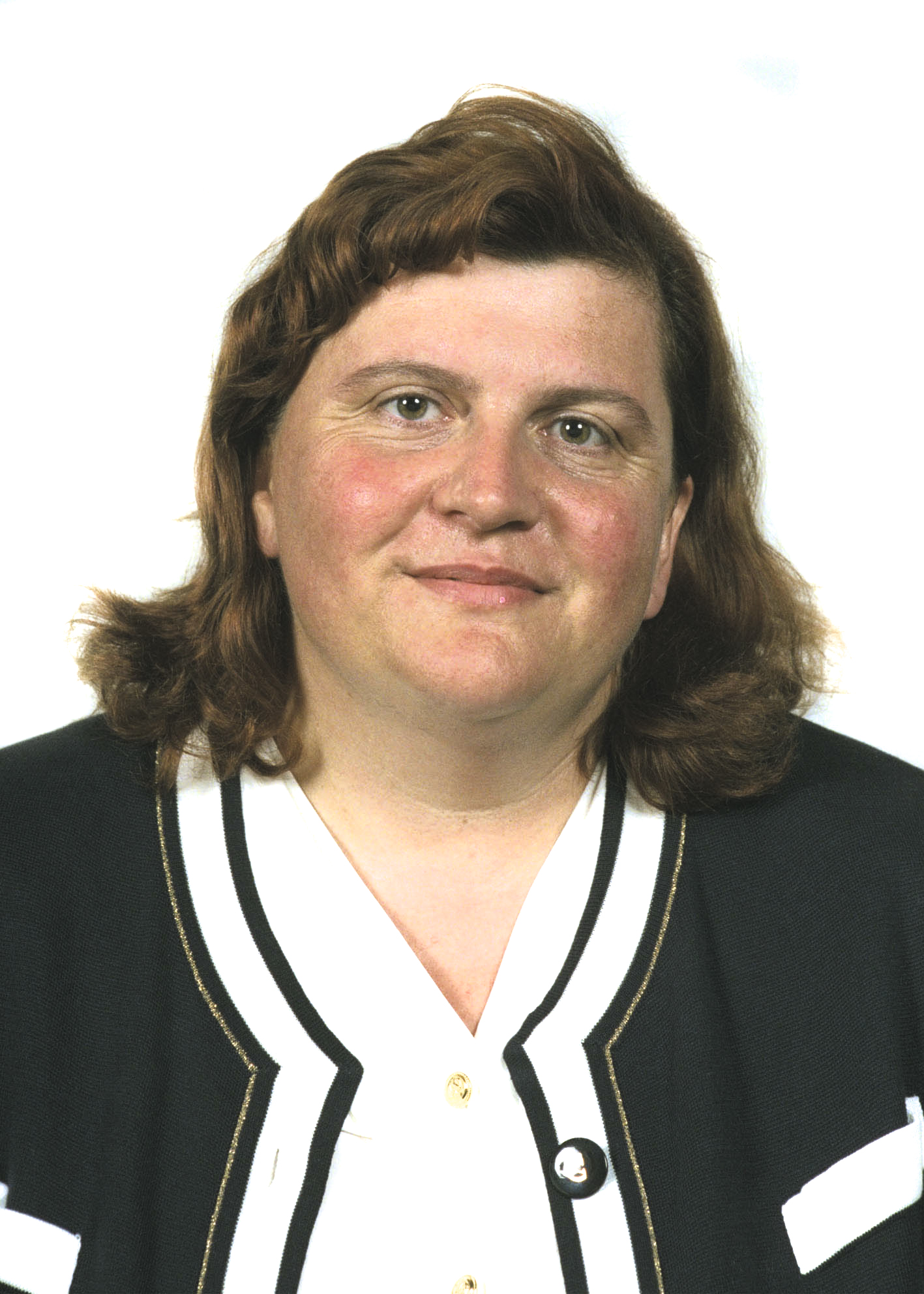
MARIN Marilena

Marilena Marin (born 24 July 1947) is an Italian Venetist politician.

A native of Conegliano, she was a founding member of Liga Veneta in 1978–1980 and, after a party purge in 1984, she was elected national secretary of the party replacing Achille Tramarin. In 1987 she married Franco Rocchetta, the party's practical leader and contributed to the birth of Lega Nord in 1991.

In June 1994 she was elected as a Member of the European Parliament (MEP), but only one month later she was replaced by Fabrizio Comencini as national secretary during a party congress. In September she left the party and in December joined the Federalists and Liberal Democrats. Consistently to that, she left the group of the European Liberal Democrat and Reform Party (of which Lega Nord was a member at the time) and joined Forza Europa, the group organized around Forza Italia, instead. She never joined Forza Italia anyway and retired from politics in 1999.
