= Raixe Venete =

Venetist cultural association

Raixe Venete (translation: Venetian Roots) is a Venetist cultural association.

Founded in 2002, Raixe Venete is aimed at "keeping the Venetian identity alive through the promotion, the protection and the circulation of the millennial Venetian culture, in all its forms, from history to language, from tradition to music". The association publishes a journal in Venetian and has connections with kin organisations and separatists from all over Europe, especially from the Basque Country and Catalonia. Its most prominents members have included Davide Guiotto and Alberto Montagner.

Raixe Venete's leading event takes place every year on the first weekend of September in Cittadella. The so-called Festa dei Veneti, which has featured Venetist associations, actors, musicians and other artists since 2003, is a meeting opportunity for Venetists from all ideological backgrounds. The first nine editions of the feast took place under mayor Massimo Bitonci. Over the years, the feast has drawn leading politicians, notably including Luca Zaia of Liga Veneta–Lega Nord and Simonetta Rubinato of the Democratic Party, and intellectuals and opinion-makers, such as Vittorio Feltri, Carlo Lottieri and Lorenzo Del Boca.

In the 2015 regional election Guiotto stood as candidate in Zaia's personal list, but was not elected.

== See also ==
- Festa dei Veneti from it.Wikipedia
