= 2013 Italian general election in Veneto =

The Italian general election of 2013 took place on 24–25 March 2013.

The election was won in Veneto by the centre-right coalition between The People of Freedom and Lega Nord (31.8%), which lost almost a half of its electorate from 2008. The Five Star Movement was the largest party with 26.3%, followed by the Democratic Party (21.3%) and The People of Freedom (18.7%). Lega Nord, the party of President Luca Zaia, fell from 27.1% to 10.5%. Despite coming third in Veneto, the centre-left coalition led by the Democratic Party obtained the most Chamber seats due to the national majority premium, while the centre-right won the regional majority premium in the Senate race.

== Results ==
=== Chamber of Deputies ===
Coalition leader	votes	votes (%)	seats	Party	votes	votes (%)	seats
Silvio Berlusconi	935,404	31.8	12	The People of Freedom	549,692	18.7	7
Silvio Berlusconi	935,404	31.8	12	Lega Nord	310,173	10.5	5
Silvio Berlusconi	935,404	31.8	12	Brothers of Italy	44,383	1.5	-
Silvio Berlusconi	935,404	31.8	12	Pensioners' Party	14,474	0.5	-
Silvio Berlusconi	935,404	31.8	12	Others	16,682	0.5	-
Beppe Grillo	775,862	26.3	10	Five Star Movement	775,862	26.3	10
Pier Luigi Bersani	686,970	23.3	24	Democratic Party	628,384	21.3	22
Pier Luigi Bersani	686,970	23.3	24	Left Ecology Freedom	53,043	1.8	2
Pier Luigi Bersani	686,970	23.3	24	Others	5,543	0.2	-
Mario Monti	349,353	11.9	5	Civic Choice	296,920	10.1	4
Mario Monti	349,353	11.9	5	Union of the Centre	44,622	1.5	1
Mario Monti	349,353	11.9	5	Others	7,811	0.3	-
Oscar Giannino	67,082	2.3	-	Act to Stop the Decline	67,082	2.3	-
Antonio Ingroia	39,608	1.3	-	Civil Revolution	39,608	1.3	-
Lodovico Pizzati	33,274	1.1	-	Venetian Independence	33,274	1.1	-
Fabrizio Comencini	15,838	0.5	-	Liga Veneta Repubblica	15,838	0.5	-
Others	41,318	1.4	-	Others	41,318	1.4	-
Total coalitions	2,944,710	100.0	51	Total parties	2,944,710	100.0	51

Source: Regional Council of Veneto

=== Senate ===
Coalition leader	votes	votes (%)	seats	Party	votes	votes (%)	seats
Silvio Berlusconi	895,425	32.8	14	The People of Freedom	523,029	19.2	9
Silvio Berlusconi	895,425	32.8	14	Lega Nord	298,412	11.0	5
Silvio Berlusconi	895,425	32.8	14	Brothers of Italy	38,511	1.4	-
Silvio Berlusconi	895,425	32.8	14	Pensioners' Party	20,631	0.8	-
Silvio Berlusconi	895,425	32.8	14	Others	14,842	0.5	-
Pier Luigi Bersani	681,501	25.0	4	Democratic Party	633,311	23.2	4
Pier Luigi Bersani	681,501	25.0	4	Left Ecology Freedom	42,635	1.6	-
Pier Luigi Bersani	681,501	25.0	4	Others	5,555	0.2	-
Beppe Grillo	670,089	24.6	4	Five Star Movement	670,089	24.6	4
Mario Monti	299,906	11.0	2	With Monti for Italy	299,906	11.0	2
Oscar Giannino	50,497	1.9	-	Act to Stop the Decline	50,497	1.9	-
Lodovico Pizzati	29,696	1.1	-	Venetian Independence	29,696	1.1	-
Antonio Ingroia	27,576	1.0	-	Civil Revolution	27,576	1.0	-
Fabrizio Comencini	20,381	0.7	-	Liga Veneta Repubblica	20,381	0.7	-
Others	48,953	1.8	-	Others	48,953	1.8	-
Total coalitions	2,724,024	100.0	24	Total parties	2,724,024	100.0	24

Source: Regional Council of Veneto
