= Plebiscito.eu =

Committee that campaigns for the independence of Veneto from Italy

Plebiscito.eu, originally known as Plebiscite 2013 (Italian: Plebiscito 2013, P2013), is a supposedly cross-party nonpartisan committee that campaigns for the independence of Veneto from Italy. Its main leaders have been Lodovico Pizzati, a former secretary of Venetian Independence (IV), one of the most active Venetist-separatist parties so far, and Gianluca Busato, who came to regional prominence in March 2014 as the main organiser of the plebiscito, an online referendum on independence.

== History ==
=== Background and formation ===
The committee is part of a long-time effort started in November 2012 with the endorsement by the Regional Council of Veneto of resolution 44/2012 on the self-determination of the Venetian people through a referendum. In April 2013 Stefano Valdegamberi, a regional councillor of the Union of the Centre and later of Popular Future, introduced a bill (342/2013) in order to call a referendum on independence by the end of the year. By 7 June the bill was endorsed by more than 15 regional councillors, sufficient to convene a special session of the Council on the issue. Also several municipal councils endorsed the bill.

In June 2013 Pizzati formed a joint separatist cartel with Valdegamberi of Popular Future (FP), Antonio Guadagnini of Veneto State (VS), Fabrizio Comencini of Liga Veneta Repubblica (LVR), other Venetist groups, associations and individuals. Subsequently, on 7 July, Pizzati launched P2013, which has since been endorsed by politicians from different parties, activists, intellectuals, professionals and entrepreneurs. They notably included Franco Rocchetta, founder and early leader of Liga Veneta (and former federal president of Lega Nord), who returned to active politics after virtually 20 years of absence from the political scene.

The birth of P2013 caused a rift within IV as some members, led by president Luca Azzano Cantarutti, rejected Pizzati's initiative and formed Let Veneto Decide, which was endorsed by Valdegamberi, VS, LVR, Raixe Venete, Veneto First, Independentist Youth, other Venetist groups and individuals (see article).

In October P2013 launched Veneto Business, a platform for separatist entrepreneurs, in partnership with Business for Scotland.

=== Online referendum on independence ===
In November P2013 launched Plebiscito.eu, an online referendum to be held in each and every municipality of Veneto on 16 February 2014. The leadership of the initiative was taken by Gianluca Busato, a software entrepreneur and long-time Venetist activist, whose firm powered the digital consultation.

The vote, with no official recognition, was later postponed and took place from 16 to 21 March 2014.

According to Plebiscito.eu's staff, 2.36 million Venetians (63.2% of all eligible voters) participated in the online referendum and 89.1% of them (that is to say 56.6% of all eligible voters) voted yes. This was enough for P2013 to proclaim Veneto's independence from Italy in Treviso on the night of 21 March.

In the poll, ten "delegates for independence" were elected too: Gianluca Busato was the preferred candidate with 135,306 votes, followed by Stefano Vescovi (48,320), Selena Veronese (46,947), Silvia Gandin (43,025), Lodovico Pizzati (25,731), Gianfranco Favaro (16,670), Raffaele Serafini (16,627), Manuel Carraro (16,627), Gianluca Panto (16,321) and Paolo Bernardini (16,299). Finally, voters were asked to express their opinion on three "foreign policy issues", where Veneto to become independent: adoption of the Euro (supported by 51.4% of voters), accession to European Union membership (supported by 55.7% of voters) and accession to NATO membership (supported by 64.5% of voters); turnout was however much lower for these three questions (24.6%, 22.3% and 19.8%, respectively).

The reliability of these results was contested by a number of analysts, while some pollsters confirmed Venetians' support of independence (see here).

=== Aftermath of the referendum ===
The day after the referendum, Busato announced that the separatist process generated by the referendum was to be led by Veneto Yes (Italian: Veneto Sì), which would be transformed "from committee for yes to independence to a political organisation which will defend the results obtained with the declaration of independence".

P2013, whose goal was reached, was basically supplanted by Plebiscito.eu, engaged in the "structuring of the Venetian Republic", and Veneto Yes.

According to Plebiscito.eu, the self-proclaimed "Venetian Republic" has two "legitimate organs": the "Delegation of Ten", comprising the aforementioned elects, and the "Treasury". The latter was established with the self-styled "Decree 2/2014 of the Venetian Republic", issued by the Delegation of Ten on 22 April, and was initially composed by Cristiano Zanin (treasurer), Stefano Venturato (counselor), Gianfranco Favaro (counselor) and Lodovico Pizzati (consultant).

In September 2014 Plebiscito.eu and the "Venetian Republic" experienced an internal reshuffle, which brought to the abandonment of leading roles by several founding members of the committee, notably including Pizzati, Zanin, Gianluca Panto, Manuel Carraro and Giovanni Dalla-Valle. The latter, along with Franco Rocchetta and Andrea Arman, distanced from the Venetist organisation over disagreements with the Delegation of Ten.

In March 2015 Plebiscito.eu organised an "election of the Provisional Parliament of the Venetian Republic". in which Veneto Yes elected a large majority of the deputies.

== Leadership ==
- Plebiscite 2013 / Plebiscito.eu
  - Spokesperson/President: Lodovico Pizzati (2013), Gianluca Busato (2013–present)
  - Territorial Coordinator: Selena Veronese (2013–present)
  - Chief Diplomat: Giovanni Dalla-Valle (2014), Gianluca Busato (acting, 2014–present)
- Venetian Republic
  - President: Gianluca Busato (2014–present)
  - Treasurer: Cristiano Zanin (2014), Stefano Venturato (2014), Selena Veronese (2014–present)
- Veneto Business
  - Director: Gianluca Busato (2013–present)
- Veneto Yes
  - Secretary: Gianluca Busato (2013–present)
