= Il Veneto Decida =

Il Veneto Decida (transl. "Let Veneto Decide") was a cross-party committee campaigning for a referendum on the independence of Veneto from Italy.

The committee was first launched in Venice on 25 July 2013, and was officially presented during a convention in Vedelago on 4 September. The committee comprises or is supported by several Venetist parties, associations and individuals, notably including:

- Venetian Independence
- Veneto State
- Liga Veneta Repubblica
- Veneto First
- Popular Future
- Independentist Youth
- Raixe Venete
- 16° Reggimento Treviso
- Pasque Veronesi
- Right to Vote
- Lombard Committee for Resolution 44

In March 2014 the committee was almost completely supplanted by the birth of United for Independent Veneto, composed of Independent Venetians (a split of Venetian Independence), Veneto State, Liga Veneta Repubblica and Popular Future. The coalition was later transformed into Independence We Veneto.
