= Venetian Independence =

Italian political party

Venetian Independence Indipendenza Veneta
- Leader: Alessio Morosin
- Secretary: Michele Favero
- Founded: 12 May 2012
- Split from: Veneto State
- Headquarters: Via Moro 4 Pieve di Soligo (TV)
- Membership (2015): 2,900
- Ideology: Venetian nationalism Separatism; Liberalism
- Colours: Yellow
- Chamber of Deputies: 0 / 400
- Senate: 0 / 200
- European Parliament: 0 / 76
- Regional Council of Veneto: 1 / 51

Website
- www.indipendenzaveneta.com

Venetian Independence (Italian: Indipendenza Veneta, Venetian: Independensa Vèneta, IV) is a Venetist, liberal and, to some extent, libertarian political party active in Veneto. The party seeks to achieve full political independence for the former territories of the Venetian Republic from Italy through a referendum. IV is represented by Alessio Morosin, elected with Liga Veneta Repubblica, in the Regional Council of Veneto.

The party was formed in May 2012 as a split from Veneto State (VS) and several of its founding members, notably including Lodovico Pizzati, were former affiliates of the Venetian National Party (PNV). The party's most recognisable member is Alessio Morosin, a former regional councillor of Liga Veneta–Lega Nord and later founding member of Liga Veneta Repubblica, but its formal leader is Michele Favero.

== History ==
=== Background and foundation ===
In September 2010 a joint Venetist-separatist party named Veneto State (VS) was formed mainly by the merger of the Venetian National Party (PNV) with the Party of the Venetians (PdV). Lodovico Pizzati, president of the PNV, was elected at the head of the new party. In less than a year, however, the two groups became more and more uncomfortable with each other and, at a congress in October 2011, Pizzati was replaced by Antonio Guadagnini by a slim majority.

The liberal/libertarian wing led by Pizzati never fully recognized the new leadership and organized a new congress, which was boycotted by the party majority around Guadagnini and which elected Pizzati as secretary. Since December 2011 VS was thus split in two different groups, both claiming to be the official party. In late March 2012 the tribunal of Venice endorsed the claims put forward by Guadagnini and his followers. No agreement was reached among the two parties and in May they took part to municipal elections in their strongholds. Candidates from the Pizzati's wing ran with some success in Loreggia (7.2%), Susegana (10.4%), Silea (3.5%), Conegliano (2.0%), Casale sul Sile (2.2%), Santa Maria di Sala (4.7%), and Mirano (1.6%). In Susegana Davide Pozzobon was elected to the city council.

Venetian Independence (IV) was officially founded on 12 May 2012 in Treviso. During the founding congress, Lodovico Pizzati was elected secretary, along with president Luca Azzano Cantarutti (who narrowly beat Gianluca Busato) and honorary president Alessio Morosin.

=== Referendum campaign ===
During the first months of 2012 IV activists, while being still members of VS, collected more than 20,000 signatures in support for a referendum on independence. On 22 May they presented the signatures to the President of Veneto, Luca Zaia. Zaia informed the Regional Council and its President Clodovaldo Ruffato asked an opinion to the legal office, which explained that such a referendum was not legal under the Constitution of Italy.

On 6 October IV organized a march in Venice, during which it proposed a resolution for a consultative referendum on independence to be approved by the Regional Council: the text of the resolution was given to Giovanni Furlanetto, a regional councillor of the LV–LN, who supported the proposition. Another Council member, Mariangelo Foggiato of North-East Union (UNE), officially presented the resolution in the Council. On 17 October a total of 42 regional councillors out of 60 officially asked a discussion on the issue. IV thus obtained national and international attention.

On 28 November the Council approved the resolution, in which "independence" was replaced by "self-determination", with 29 votes in favour, 2 against and 5 abstentions. Those in favour included Foggiato, the entire group of the LV–LN, most councillors of The People of Freedom, Pietrangelo Pettenò of the Communist Refoundation Party, Diego Bottacin of Toward North and independent Sandro Sandri, who had expounded the resolution at the start of the session, while the entire group of the Democratic Party left the floor in protest, but proclaimed their support for a special statute for Veneto. IV member rejoiced.

After a hunger strike by two members of IV, on 18 March 2013 Zaia and Ruffato implemented the first step mandated by resolution 44, by appointing the special commission of jurists who would examine the issue from a legal point of view. The commission was composed of six experts, including IV's Cantarutti.

In April 2013 Stefano Valdegamberi, a regional councillor of the Union of the Centre and later of Popular Future, introduced a bill (342/2013) in order to call a referendum on independence by the end of the year. By 7 June the bill was endorsed by more than 15 regional councillors, sufficient to convene a special session of the Council on the issue. Also several municipal councils endorsed the bill.

=== 2013 general and local elections ===
The party took part to the 2013 general election and garnered 1.1% of the regional vote, and 2.0% in the province of Treviso. IV's support was concentrated in the border areas between the provinces of Treviso and Padua, where it obtained its best results (Villa del Conte 10.6%, Vedelago 9.4%, Campo San Martino 8.4%, etc.).

In the 2013 municipal election the party focused especially on Treviso, where IV's Alessia Bellon won a mere 2.1% of the vote. The party had much better results in Vedelago (17.9%), Nervesa della Battaglia (8.2%), San Stino di Livenza (4.1%) and Lazise (3.9%). Most strikingly, in Vedelago Cristina Andretta, The People of Freedom's deputy mayor who had switched to IV, was elected mayor by a landslide 65.6%. Andretta's candidacy had caused a rift between Pizzati, who opposed her alliance with a tricoloured civic list and cut party's funds for her campaign, and Cantarutti, who supported it, but her election was finally saluted by Pizzati.

=== Plebiscite 2013 vs. Let Veneto Decide ===
In June 2013, having reconciled with Veneto State (VS), Pizzati formed a joint separatist cartel with Stefano Valdegamberi, VS leader Guadagnini, Fabrizio Comencini of Liga Veneta Repubblica (LVR), other Venetist groups, associations and individuals. Subsequently, on 7 July, Pizzati launched Plebiscite 2013 (P2013), a cross-party nonpartisan committee for the referendum, which was endorsed by politicians, intellectuals and professionals.

The birth of P2013 caused a rift within IV: the party's historical bulk (Bernardini, Busato, etc.) sided with Pizzati, while others, led by president Cantarutti, who, in recent times, had frictions with Pizzati on several issues and finally blocked Pizzati's request of "extraordinary powers" during a special party congress on 30 June, severely criticized it. Honorary president Morosin, who had initially joined P2013, backtracked, remained equidistant from the two factions and eventually sided with Cantarutti's. For his part, Bernardini explained that he supported both IV, of which Pizzati was still secretary, and P2013: the former was a separatist party, while the latter was intended to be a broader committee for the referendum, including people of different parties and also individuals opposed to independence but in favour of the right of Venetians to decide. However, by early August the two factions seemed irreconciliable: the one led by Pizzati and Busato operated only through P2013, while that of Cantarutti and Morosin launched a new website, formed an alternative referendum committee (Let Veneto Decide) and declared that anyone had joined P2013 was incompatible with IV. In late August the steering committee of IV, in absence of Pizzati, asked the secretary, Busato and other members of their faction to resign from the party, but the deliberation was suspended by Pizzati. A few days later the committee declared that Pizzati was no longer secretary, after more than 2/3 of local coordinators had voted a motion of no confidence against him. Giuliomaria Turco was chosen as Pizzati's successor.

Let Veneto Decide, which was officially endorsed also by Valdegamberi, VS, LVR, Raixe Venete, Veneto First, Independentist Youth, other Venetist groups and individuals, was launched on 4 September 2013 in Vedelago, at the presence of Carlo Lottieri of Lombard Committee for Resolution 44, MEP Mara Bizzotto of Liga Veneta–Lega Nord and Jordi Fornas i Prat of Catalan Solidarity for Independence. IV soon lost interest in the coalition, which would eventually become Independence We Veneto.

=== 2015 regional election and next years ===
In January 2014 another internal struggle resulted in a radical change of the party's constitution and the marginalisation of Cantarutti, to Morosin's advantage. Subsequently, Cantarutti and a group of followers abandoned IV and launched Independent Venetians (VI). IV decided not to participate in the 2014 European Parliament and local elections. For the EP election the party however endorsed some candidates due to their support of the independence referendum.

In the run-up of the 2015 regional election it was announced that Morosin would stand as IV's candidate for President and that the party had signed a political pact with Chiavegato for Independence, a group led by Lucio Chiavegato, in his support. Among the leading candidates fielded by the party, Fabio Padovan, founder of the European Federalist Free Entrepreneurs, former deputy of the LV–LN and candidate for President with the Fronte Marco Polo in 2000, stood out. Despite these good candidates, the party was overshadowed by Independence We Veneto and won 2.5% of the vote, not enough to send any IV member to the Council.

In March 2016 the party held a congress and elected Massimo Vidori as its new first counselor. In the 2017 local elections, the party fielded lists only in a few places, including Santa Maria di Sala (11.1%), Jesolo (4.2%), Mirano (1.4%), and Thiene (1.4%). In October 2017, while campaigning hard for the successful autonomy referendum, the party elected as its leader Juri De Luca, whose title was re-named from first counselor to spokesperson.

In the 2018 municipal election in Vedelago, a traditional stronghold, IV won 13.8% in joint list with the LVR and in alliance with the LV–LN, while in much more populous Treviso Silvia Nizzetto, IV's deputy spokesperson, stood as candidate in Mario Conte's personal list (Conte was the LV–LN's candidate for mayor), was subsequently elected to the municipal council and was consequently appointed by elected mayor Conte as municipal minister for Education, Sport and Participation.

In July 2018 IV signed a political pact with We Are Veneto (SV), Guadagnini's new party. The pact was confirmed for the 2019 local elections.

=== From 2020 regional election to 2025 regional election ===
Between April and October 2019 SV was a founding member of the Party of Venetians (PdV). In the 2020 Venetian regional election, in which Zaia was elected by a landslide 76.8% of the vote and LV-sponsored lists won virtually all Venetist votes, the PdV obtained 1.0% of the vote, far less than IV alone in 2015.

In January 2021 IV, which had parted ways from the PdV, changed again its internal organisation and Favero was elected to the new office of party secretary.

In the 2022 municipal election in Jesolo the party won 3.9% of the vote. In the 2025 municipal election in Noale the party actively supported the winning candidate for mayor. In the 2025 muncicipal election in Santa Maria di Sala the party won 16.4% of the vote and its local leader as well as national councillor Daniel Basso was appointed deputy mayor.

In the 2025 regional election the party decided not to participate as a party, but to include its "most well-known representatives" Morosin and Favero in the lists led by Riccardo Szumski, candidate for Resist Veneto, and Alberto Stefani, regional secretary of the LV and would-be candidate for the centre-right coalition. Favero was thus included in the provincial slate of Resist Veneto in Padua, while Morosin headed the list of Liga Veneta Repubblica (LVR) in Padua and Venice; other party members also ran, including Massimo Vidori with the Populars for Veneto. Morosin was elected becoming the first regional councillor of the party, plus Davide Lovat, a separatist close to the party, was elected for Resist Veneto.

== Electoral results ==
=== Italian Parliament ===
Election	Leader	Chamber of Deputies				Senate of the Republic			
Election	Leader	Votes	%	Seats	+/–	Votes	%	Seats	+/–
2013	Lodovico Pizzati	33,274 (Note: Considering the Veneto 1 and Veneto 2 constituencies for the Chamber of Deputies and the Veneto constituency for the Senate of the Republic.)	1.2	0 / 51	New	29,696	1.1	0 / 24	New

=== Regional Council of Veneto ===
Election	Votes	%	Seats	+/–
2015	46,578	2.52	0 / 51	New
2020	Into PdV		0 / 51	0
2025	Into LVR		1 / 51	▲1

== Symbols ==
2012–2016

2016–

== Leadership ==
=== 2012–2014 organisation ===
- Secretary: Lodovico Pizzati (2012–2013), Giuliomaria Turco (2013–2014)
- President: Luca Azzano Cantarutti (2012–2014)
- Honorary President: Alessio Morosin (2012–2014)

=== 2014–2021 organisation ===
- First Counselor / Spokesperson: Michele Favero (2014–2016), Massimo Vidori (2016–2017), Juri De Luca (2017–2021)
- First Coordinator: Daniele Baratella (2014–2015), Nico Gaiani (2015–2017), Barbara Rossetto (2017–2021)
- Treasurer: Cristiano Zanin (2012–2013), Pietro Bortolin (2013), Marco Zaninelli (2013–2014), Andrea Bisello (2014–2016), Mario Scapolo (2016–2017), Andrea Bisello (2017–2021)

=== 2021–present organisation ===
- Secretary: Michele Favero (2021–present)
  - Deputy Secretary: Alessia Bellon (2021–2024)
