= Giuliomaria Turco =

Italian politician

Giuliomaria Turco (born 29 March 1982, Verona, Veneto, Italy) is a Venetian independentist, politician and pharmacist.

== Biography ==
He joined Veneto State (President Alessia Bellon and Secretary Lodovico Pizzati) in the 2012 and he was candidates as mayor of Verona in March 2012. After the judgment of the State Council he was ousted from the electoral race.

In May 2012 Turco switched to Venetian Independence (IV) and was elected as Vice Secretary (Secretary Lodovico Pizzati, President Luca Azzano Cantarutti and Honorary President Alessio Morosin).

In June 2013, after an executive board where Pizzati requested the total power of the politic decisions and where he was outvoted, he was nominated Vice Secretary with function of Secretary from Pizzati. In late July 2013 the executive board of Venetian Independence (IV) deposed Pizzati and nominated Turco as Temporary Secretary. After the September 2013 Congress, Turco was elected Secretary, with Vice Secretary Samuel Guiotto.

The 4 September 2013 he opened the conference in Vedelago where, at the presence of the most majors that supported the project of law 342, was officially launched Let Veneto Decide.
