= Provincial elections in Veneto =

This page gathers the results of provincial elections in Veneto since 1995.

The direct election of the Presidents of Province was introduced in 1993 and carried out for the first time in 1995.

Direct elections, of both Presidents and Councils, were suspended in 2012 and replaced by indirect elections in 2014. Under the new system, only mayors and municipal councillors vote for the President and the Council, often forming bipartisan or trans-party alliances.

Contextually, the Province of Venice is under the process of transformation into "Metropolitan City of Venice" and its leadership was thus not renewed in 2014.

== Direct elections (1995–2012) ==
=== 1995 provincial elections ===
	Pole of Freedoms			Alliance of Progressives			Lega Nord			Others
	candidate	1st round	2nd round	candidate	1st round	2nd round	candidate	1st round	2nd round	1st round
Belluno	Angelo Baraldo (Forza Italia)	28.7%	30.0%	Oscar De Bona (Lega Autonomia Veneta)	39.1%	70.0%	Leonardo Colle (Liga Veneta–Lega Nord)	26.5%	-	5.7%
Padua	Pierluigi Ancilotto (Forza Italia)	37.7%	43.5%	Ennio Ronchitelli (Labour Federation)	18.7%	with Sacco	Renzo Sacco (Liga Veneta–Lega Nord)	29.7%	56.5%	13.9%
Rovigo	Vittorio Cogo (Forza Italia)	33.2%	41.3%	Alberto Brigo (Italian People's Party)	36.4%	58.7%	Cosimo Oliva (Liga Veneta–Lega Nord)	11.6%	-	18.8%
Treviso	Fausto Favaro (Forza Italia)	31.1%	34.8%	Tiziano Gava (Democratic Party of the Left)	13.4%	-	Giovanni Mazzonetto (Liga Veneta–Lega Nord)	43.5%	65.2%	12.0%
Venice	Paolo Dalla Vecchia (Forza Italia)	36.1%	38.2%	Luigino Busatto (Democratic Party of the Left)	42.9%	61.8	Alberto Mazzonetto (Liga Veneta–Lega Nord)	10.2%	-	10.8%
Verona	Aventino Frau (Forza Italia)	44.3%	46.0%	Silvia Mostarda (Democratic Party of the Left)	13.4%	-	Antonio Borghesi (Liga Veneta–Lega Nord)	35.4%	54.0%	6.9%
Vicenza	Giuseppe Castaman (Forza Italia)	34.0%	38.6%	Giuseppe Doppio (Italian People's Party)	31.4%	61.4%	Manuela Dal Lago (Liga Veneta–Lega Nord)	29.0%	-	5.6%

Source: Regional Council of Veneto

=== 1997 provincial elections ===
	Pole for Freedoms			The Olive Tree			Lega Nord			Others
	candidate	1st round	2nd round	candidate	1st round	2nd round	candidate	1st round	2nd round	1st round
Vicenza	Giuseppe Castaman (Forza Italia)	22.0%	-	Giuseppe Doppio (Italian People's Party)	25.0%	37.7%	Manuela Dal Lago (Liga Veneta–Lega Nord)	41.4%	62.3%	11.6%

Source: Istituto Cattaneo

=== 1998 provincial elections ===
	Pole for Freedoms			The Olive Tree			Lega Nord			Others
	candidate	1st round	2nd round	candidate	1st round	2nd round	candidate	1st round	2nd round	1st round
Treviso	Francesco Benazzi (Forza Italia); Carla Puppinato (United Christian Democrats)	24.1% 7.2%	40.0%	Ivano Sartor (Italian People's Party); Gianni Maddalon (North-East Movement)	16.8% 8.7%	-	Luca Zaia (Liga Veneta–Lega Nord)	41.4%	60.0%	1.8%

Source: Istituto Cattaneo

=== 1999 provincial elections ===
	Pole for Freedoms			The Olive Tree			Lega Nord			Others
	candidate	1st round	2nd round	candidate	1st round	2nd round	candidate	1st round	2nd round	1st round
Belluno	Angelo Costola (Forza Italia)	23.5%	34.5%	Oscar De Bona (Dolomitic Agreement); Livio Viel (Democrats of the Left); Giuseppe Fascina (The Democrats)	38.4% 14.3% 7.3%	65.5%	Andrea Dall'O (Liga Veneta–Lega Nord)	11.2%	-	5.3%
Padua	Vittorio Casarin (Forza Italia)	43.1%	55.4%	Antonino Ziglio (Italian People's Party)	39.7%	44.6%	Flavio Minzolini (Liga Veneta–Lega Nord)	7.3%	-	6.1%
Rovigo	Alberto Brigo (United Christian Democrats); Andrea Previati (National Alliance)	26.9% 11.5%	41.7%	Federico Saccardin (Democrat of the Left)	48.4%	58.3%	Andrea Astolfi (Liga Veneta–Lega Nord)	5.3%	-	7.9%
Venice	Luciano Falcier (Forza Italia)	35.8%	43.7%	Luigino Busatto (Democrats of the Left); Maria Luisa Semi (The Democrats)	39.6% 8.2%	56.3%	Alberto Mazzonetto (Liga Veneta–Lega Nord)	7.8%	-	8.6%
Verona	Aleardo Merlin (Forza Italia)	41.5%	53.0%	Franco Bonfante (Democrats of the Left)	29.8%	47.0%	Stefano Zaninelli (Liga Veneta–Lega Nord)	15.0%	-	8.2%

Source: Istituto Cattaneo

=== 2002 provincial elections ===
	House of Freedoms			The Olive Tree			Lega Nord			Others
	candidate	1st round	2nd round	candidate	1st round	2nd round	candidate	1st round	2nd round	1st round
Treviso	Francesco Giacomin (Forza Italia)	25.1%	-	Diego Bottacin (Democracy is Freedom)	25.4%	31.1%	Luca Zaia (Liga Veneta–Lega Nord)	43.3%	68.9%	6.2%
Vicenza	Manuela Dal Lago (Liga Veneta–Lega Nord)	57.0%	-	Giuseppe Berlato Sella (Democracy is Freedom)	35.2%	-				7.8%

Source: La Repubblica

=== 2004 provincial elections ===
	House of Freedoms			The Olive Tree			Lega Nord			Others
	candidate	1st round	2nd round	candidate	1st round	2nd round	candidate	1st round	2nd round	1st round
Belluno	Floriano Pra (Forza Italia)	40.2%	43.8%	Sergio Reolon (Democracy is Freedom)	39.2%	56.2%	Gianvittore Vaccari (Liga Veneta–Lega Nord)	9.7%	with Pra	11.1%
Padua	Vittorio Casarin (Forza Italia)	44.2%	51.0%	Franco Frigo (Democracy is Freedom)	41.8%	49.0%	Maurizio Conte (Liga Veneta–Lega Nord)	8.8%	with Casarin	5.2%
Rovigo	Renzo Marangon (Forza Italia)	37.2%	-	Federico Saccardin (Democracy is Freedom)	50.6%	-	Franco Secchieri (Liga Veneta–Lega Nord)	5.9%	-	6.3%
Venice	Carlo Alberto Tesserin (Forza Italia)	32.3%	-	Davide Zoggia (Democrats of the Left)	50.5%	-	Giovanni Anci (Liga Veneta–Lega Nord)	8.2%	-	9.0%
Verona	Elio Mosele (Forza Italia)	39.2%	52.5%	Gustavo Franchetto (Democracy is Freedom)	37.9%	47.5%	Flavio Tosi (Liga Veneta–Lega Nord)	13.2%	with Mosele	9.7%

Source: Istituto Cattaneo

=== 2006 provincial elections ===
	House of Freedoms (incl. Lega Nord)			The Union			North-East Project			Others
	candidate	1st round	2nd round	candidate	1st round	2nd round	candidate	1st round	2nd round	1st round
Treviso	Leonardo Muraro (Liga Veneta–Lega Nord)	57.3%	-	Lorenzo Biagi (Democracy is Freedom)	30.2%	-	Giorgio Panto (North-East Project)	10.3%	-	2.2%

Source: Istituto Cattaneo

=== 2007 provincial elections ===
	House of Freedoms (incl. Lega Nord)			The Union			VPPE, DC, LVR, etc.			Others
	candidate	1st round	2nd round	candidate	1st round	2nd round	candidate	1st round	2nd round	1st round
Vicenza	Attilio Schneck (Liga Veneta–Lega Nord)	60.0%	-	Pietro Collareda (Democracy is Freedom)	17.2%	-	Giorgio Carollo (Veneto for the EPP)	9.9%	-	13.0%

Source: La Repubblica

=== 2009 provincial elections ===
	The People of Freedom & Lega Nord			Democratic Party and allies			Union of the Centre			Others
	candidate	1st round	2nd round	candidate	1st round	2nd round	candidate	1st round	2nd round	1st round
Belluno	Gianpaolo Bottacin (Liga Veneta–Lega Nord)	47.1%	51.1%	Sergio Reolon (Democratic Party)	41.2%	48.9%	Luigi De Cesero (Union of the Centre)	8.0%	-	3.7%
Padua	Barbara Degani (The People of Freedom)	53.9%	-	Antonio Albuzio (Italy of Values)	30.6%	-	Antonio De Poli (Union of the Centre)	11.3%	-	4.2%
Rovigo	Antonello Contiero (Liga Veneta–Lega Nord)	48.7%	47.7%	Tiziana Virgili (Democratic Party)	36.7%	52.3%	Michele Raisi (Union of the Centre)	6.2%	-	8.3%
Venice	Francesca Zaccariotto (Liga Veneta–Lega Nord)	48.4%	51.9%	Davide Zoggia (Democratic Party)	41.9%	48.1%	Ugo Bergamo (Union of the Centre)	5.6%	-	4.1%
Verona	Giovanni Miozzi (The People of Freedom)	59.1%	-	Diego Zardini (Democratic Party)	23.3%	-	Mario Rossi (Union of the Centre)	8.4%	-	9.2%

Source: La Repubblica

=== 2011 provincial elections ===
	The People of Freedom & Lega Nord			Democratic Party and allies			Union of the Centre & North-East Union			Others
	candidate	1st round	2nd round	candidate	1st round	2nd round	candidate	1st round	2nd round	1st round
Treviso	Leonardo Muraro (Liga Veneta–Lega Nord)	57.5%	-	Floriana Casellato (Democratic Party)	32.9%	-	Marco Zabotti (Union of the Centre)	6.8%	-	2.8%

Source: Ministry of the Interior

== Indirect elections (2014–present) ==
=== 2014 provincial elections ===
Province	Candidate	Party	Coalition	Vote	%
Belluno	Daniela Larese	Italian Socialist Party	PD, LV, FI, NCD, UdC, PSI, FdI, others	73,538	100.0
Belluno	Total			73,538	100.0
Belluno	Sources: Province of Belluno, Corriere delle Alpi				
Padua	Enoch Soranzo	Independent (Liga Veneta)	PD, LV–faction, FI–faction, NCD, UdC, PSI, others	46,313	54.8
Padua	Massimiliano Barison	Forza Italia	LV–faction, FI–faction, FdI, others	38,181	45.2
Padua	Total			84,494	100.0
Padua	Sources: Province of Padua, Corriere del Veneto, Il Mattino di Padova				
Rovigo	Marco Trombini	Forza Italia	FI, LV, FdI, others	45,322	51.4
Rovigo	Nicola Garbellini	Democratic Party	PD, NCD, UdC, PSI, others	42,787	48.6
Rovigo	Total			88,109	100.0
Rovigo	Sources: Province of Rovigo, Corriere del Veneto, RovigoOggi.it				
Verona	Antonio Pastorello	Forza Italia	FI–majority, LV, Tosi List, NCD, FdI, FP, others	47,166	51.5
Verona	Giovanni Peretti	Union of the Centre	PD, FI–minority, UdC, PSI, others	44,437	48.5
Verona	Total			91,603	100.0
Verona	Sources: Province of Verona, Corriere del Veneto, L'Arena				
Vicenza	Achille Variati	Democratic Party	PD, FI, NCD, UdC, PSI, others	52,288	63.7
Vicenza	Milena Cecchetto	Liga Veneta	LV, FdI, others	29,741	36.3
Vicenza	Total			82,029	100.0
Vicenza	Sources: Province of Vicenza, Corriere del Veneto, Il Giornale di Vicenza, VicenzaReport				
