= Veneto State =

Veneto State Veneto Stato
- Leaders: Lodovico Pizzati; Antonio Guadagnini
- Founded: 12 September 2010
- Dissolved: March 2016
- Merger of: PNV; PdV
- Succeeded by: We Are Veneto
- Ideology: Venetian nationalism Separatism
- Think Tank: Veneto State of Europe

Website
- Official website

Veneto State (Veneto Stato, VS) was a Venetist political party active in Veneto and eastern Lombardy. The party's goal to achieve full political independence for the former territories of the Venetian Republic from Italy through a referendum. VS had a handful of municipal councillors and was once represented in the Regional Council of Veneto.

After the exit of the libertarian faction led by Lodovico Pizzati, Paolo Bernardini and Gianluca Busato in December 2011 and the formation of Venetian Independence in May 2012, VS was seen as the communitarian wing of the Venetian independence movement. The party was also influenced by Christian democracy and social democracy. Both its latest secretary, Antonio Guadagnini, and its former president, Giustino Cherubin, were former Christian Democrats. VS had close ties with Independentist Youth, the Venetians Movement, and, strangely enough, the Libertarian Movement. At the European level, VS cooperated with the European Partnership for Independence and the International Commission of European Citizens.

Since the 2015 regional election, the party had been represented in the Regional Council of Veneto by Guadagnini, elected on the Independence We Veneto list. In March 2016 Guadagnini changed his affiliation to We Are Veneto (SV), which soon became the practical successor of Veneto State. VS is thus no longer active, but was outlived by its international section, "Veneto State of Europe" (VSE). Both SV and VSE participated in the formation of the Party of Venetians in 2019.

== History ==
=== Foundation and first elections ===
The party was founded on 12 September 2010 in Cadoneghe (Padua) by the merger of the Venetian National Party (PNV) and the Party of the Venetians (PdV), that is two say the two main independentist parties in Veneto at the time (the largest Venetist party, Liga Veneta–Lega Nord, was not overtly separatist). VS was joined also by many members of North-East Project (PNE), in particular the majority of members from the provincial section of Padua, led by Umberto Cocco.

The congress, opened by the greetings sent by Eva Klotz (leader of South Tyrolean Freedom) and by Gavino Sale (leader of Independence Republic of Sardinia), was attended by Walter Kaswalder (president of the Trentino Tyrolean Autonomist Party), Federico Simeoni (Friulian Front) and other guests. Lodovico Pizzati, outgoing president of the PNV, was elected secretary of the new party, Giustino Cherubin (PdV) president and Gianluca Busato (PNV) treasurer. More importantly, the new party saw the participation of Venetist heavyweights such as Alessio Morosin and Silvano Polo.

In November 2010 Antonio Guadagnini, a former member of the Union of Christian and Centre Democrats and Liga Veneto Autonomo, announced that he had joined the party and that he would stand as candidate for President of the Province of Treviso in the 2011 provincial election. In the election Guadagnini won just 1.5% of the vote (+0.6% from the sum of PNV and PdV results in 2010), and did better in the eastern part of the province (traditionally a stronghold of LV–LN), and especially in Crespano del Grappa (8.9%), Paderno del Grappa (5.2%), Fonte (4.9%) and Borso del Grappa (3.6%), which was enough for the party to celebrate.

=== 2011 congress in Vicenza ===
In the second half of 2011, VS started to rise in opinion polls up to 5%. The party started to receive media coverage and its membership rose to 1,500 members by the end of September. However, the party experienced some internal infighting during the summer culminating in an early congress in October. On one side there was the group coming from the PdV (Patrik Riondato, Giustino Cherubin, Silvano Polo), on the other secretary Lodovico Pizzati and the majority of those who had been likewise members of the PNV (Gianluca Busato, Alessio Morosin, Paolo Bernardini, Gianluca Panto, Claudio Ghiotto, Alessia Bellon, Luca Schenato).

Those behind Pizzati represented the libertarian and modernizing wing of the party, while those led by Riondato were more traditional Venetists, Christian and social democrats. There were also clashes over the form of party, the relations with other Venetist parties, groups and associations, and Pizzati's style of leadership (too centralistic according to his opponents). At some point, there was a real chance that three separate congresses would take place, one in Vicenza, one in Treviso and one in Cadoneghe, and a split looked almost certain. Finally, on 13 October, an agreement was reached on a joint congress.

Already on 7 October, Antonio Guadagnini surprisingly declared he would challenge Pizzati's leadership and, a couple of days later, unveiled a tax plan which included the abolition of personal income tax and the introduction of a 50% tax on gains and savings. The proposal was labeled by his opponents as socialist. Soon after the agreement on the congress was reached, Morosin, close to Pizzati, declared he was running to become party president. Lucio Chiavegato, LIFE activist and former member of the PNV, decided to run for president in ticket with Guadagnini instead. Pizzati and Morosin were endorsed by Busato, Bellon, Panto, most former PNV members and the provincial section of Brescia, while Guadganini and Chiavegato had the support of most former PdV members and the provincial sections of Verona, Vicenza and Rovigo. From outside of the party, Chiavegato was endorsed also by Fabio Padovan, historic leader of LIFE and long-time Venetist, and by Flavio Faccia and Flavio Contin of the Venetian Most Serene Government (Christian Contin de facto supported Morosin instead).

On 23 October the congress took place. The credentials of some delegates from Venice and Brescia, all supporters of Pizzati, were refused and Polo, who presided over the assembly, refused some motions presented by Pizzati's supporters on the interpretation of the party's constitution. There was no vote on Pizzati, as he and his supporters expected, and it was not possible to present other candidates to party leadership. Subsequently, Guadagnini and Chiavegato were narrowly elected secretary and president of VS, respectively, Massimo Busato (another former PNV member now with Guadagnini) was elected treasurer, and the main organs of the party were filled by Guadagnini's supporters. Polo's conduct was heavily criticized by Pizzati's supporters, who felt the assembly was not democratic. A split eventually occurred as leading libertarians such as Ghiotto and Schenato decided to quit the party by the end of the day.

=== One name, two parties ===
In November VS received some national attention for a demonstration against Equitalia, the Italian revenue collector service, but internal infighting was not over.

On 15 November 2011, after Guadagnini sacked him as party leader in the province of Padua, Stefano Venturato formed an autonomous provincial group. Two days later, the entire provincial section of Brescia left in protest. On 18 November, the Council of Ten expelled Pizzati, G. Busato and Venturato. As a response, Pizzati, as "legal secretary", decided to call a new congress of the party on the grounds that the October congress had been not valid, and, in doing that, he was endorsed by some 100 members of the party. The move by Pizzati received the support of the sections of Treviso and Brescia, Morosin and Venturato.

On 11 December the group around Pizzati celebrated a congress in Venice. Pizzati was elected secretary, Bellon president and Cristiano Zanin treasurer.

Since December 2011 the party was thus split in two different groups, both claiming to be the true Veneto State. The break-up was confirmed by the decision of the other group, led by Guadagnini and Chiavegato, to summon a new congress in Vicenza for 22 January, to which Pizzati's followers refused to participate.

On 22 January 2012 Guadagnini and Chiavegato were re-elected in their wing's congress, which saw the participation of four times the number of members who participated to the congress organized by Pizzati in December. The convention was also attended by representatives from North-East Union, Venetian People's Unity, European Federalist Free Entrepreneurs, Raixe Venete and other Venetist organizations. From the Pizzati's camp, which had organized a big rally on 19 January near Treviso, the reaction was that the Vicenza congress was illegal and that what was born there was "an ethnic and intolerant tiny party".

On 29 March 2012 the tribunal of Venice decided on a lawsuit filed by Chiavegato and Guadagnini: both congresses held after the one in Vicenza were declared not valid. Guadagnini thus affirmed his victory and offered an olive branch to the other group, saying that in the upcoming local elections he would support the electoral lists filed by the Pizzati's faction in its strongholds (mainly the province of Treviso). No agreement was however reached.

On 6–7 May VS took part to fourteen municipal contests. Candidates from the official party ran in Verona (0.3%), Cerea (4.6%), San Martino Buon Albergo (4.7%), Sandrigo (5.7%), Sarego (3.7%), Thiene (3.9%), and Piombino Dese (4.3%), while those from the unofficial wing in Loreggia (7.2%), Susegana (10.4%), Silea (3.5%), Conegliano (2.0%), Casale sul Sile (2.2%), Santa Maria di Sala (4.7%), and Mirano (1.6%). In Susegana Davide Pozzobon was elected to the city council.

On 12 May, during a demonstration in Venice, Pizzati and his followers launched a new party called Venetian Independence (IV).

=== 2013 general and local elections ===
On 30 September the national congress of the party re-elected secretary Guadagnini, who beat Francesco Falezza, and replaced Chiavegato, who chose to step down, with Giustino Cherubin. More importantly, VS decided by a narrow majority to take part to the 2013 general election, a taboo until that point. The decision to take part to the election caused the exit of Chiavegato, who would be elected president of the European Federalist Free Entrepreneurs in May 2013.

On 13 December it was announced that Davide Lovat would be the party's candidate for mayor of Vicenza in 2013. Lovat, a Christian socialist who was expelled from LV–LN in July 2011 and was later the leader of the Community Democratic League (LDC), represented the strengthening of the communitarian grip over the party. However, Lovat was eventually excluded from the election for not having presented the required signatures; VS considered this a conspiracy.

In the 2013 general election VS obtained 0.4% of the vote regionally, 0.7% in its stronghold of Vicenza.

In the run-up of the 2013 municipal elections, Guadagnini opened to IV and VS officially endorsed that party's candidates for mayor.

=== Separatist coalitions ===
In June 2013, having reconciled with IV, Guadagnini formed a joint separatist cartel with Lodovico Pizzati of IV, Fabrizio Comencini of Liga Veneta Repubblica (LVR), Stefano Valdegamberi of Popular Future (FP), other Venetist groups, associations and individuals.

In July VS, having endorsed IV's campaign for a referendum on independence (see Venetian nationalism#Recent developments), joined Let Veneto Decide, a IV-led cross-party committee for the independence referendum, along with Valdegamberi, VS, Raixe Venete, Veneto First, Independentist Youth, other Venetist groups and individuals. The initiative was launched on 4 September 2013 in Vedelago, at the presence of Carlo Lottieri of Lombard Committee for Resolution 44, MEP Mara Bizzotto of Liga Veneta–Lega Nord and Jordi Fornas i Prat of Catalan Solidarity for Independence.

In October 2013, for the second time in a row, the congress of the party failed due to the lack of the quorum needed to be valid.

In March 2014 the party joined forces with Independent Venetians, Liga Veneta Repubblica and Popular Future in order to form "United for Independent Veneto". In July 2014 the coalition was transformed into "We Independent Veneto" (NVI), after the entry of other parties, notably including North-East Project and Chiavegato for Independence. After the exit of Chiavegato and his group from the alliance and their alignment with IV, the remaining parties of NVI formed a joint list for the 2015 regional election named Independence We Veneto (INV) in support to Luca Zaia, incumbent President of Veneto and candidate of Liga Veneta–Lega Nord.

=== Representation in the Regional Council ===
In the election, the list won 2.7% of the vote and Guadagnini was elected regional councillor in the provincial constituency of Vicenza. Soon after being installed, Guadagnini, who was appointed Secretary of the Regional Council of Veneto, formed a pro-independence "inter-group", which was joined from the start by Stefano Valdegamberi, re-elected councillor in Zaia's personal list, and Massimiliano Barison of Forza Italia.

In March 2016 Guadagnini severed his ties with INV and changed his affiliation in the Council to We Are Veneto (VS), which was contextually established as a broader Venetist and separatist party, including the former leader of Independentist Youth Giacomo Mirto.

== International relations ==
Since 2012 VS focused on establishing relations with other separatist parties and pro-independence groups at the European level. The party appointed Giovanni Dalla-Valle, who lived in Scotland and was a long-time member of the Scottish National Party (SNP), as its international secretary. Della Valle later left after a row with the party leadership, but the SNP and the European Partnership for Independence (EPI) remained the main international references of the party.

On 22 September 2012, a Venetian delegation took part in the March and Rally for Scottish Independence in Scotland's capital, Edinburgh. The delegation was led by Della Valle and included also representatives of Liga Veneta–Lega Nord (notably Massimo Bitonci and Roberto Ciambetti), Independentist Youth, Venetian Independence and Raixe Venete. In November and December VS strengthened its ties with the EPI through two conventions in Treviso and Vicenza, which were attended by Scottish, Catalan and Flemish representatives. In February 2013 VS took part to the first congress of the International Commission of European Citizens (ICEC) in Barcelona. Ruggero Zigliotto and Luca Polo have represented VS in the board of ICEC. In order to jointly campaign for an ICEC European petition on self-determination, in April VS formed a political pact with South Tyrolean Freedom and Liga Veneta Repubblica.

In August 2013 Antonio Guadagnini, secretary of VS, gave a lecture on Venetian self-determination at the Universitat Catalana d'Estiu.

In October 2013 VS launched Veneto State of Europe (VSE), a think tank aimed at spreading the separatist idea among the civil society. VSE outlived VS and its leaders, Zigliotto and Polo, led it into the Party of Venetians, a VS/SV-led coalition formed in April 2019.

== Symbols ==
2011–2013

2013–2016

== Leadership ==
- Secretary: Lodovico Pizzati (2010–2011), Antonio Guadagnini (2011–2016)
- President: Giustino Cherubin (2010–2011), Lucio Chiavegato (2011–2012), Giustino Cherubin (2012–2013), Eraldo Barcaro (acting, 2013), Antonio Zanchin (acting, 2013–2016)
- Treasurer: Gianluca Busato (2010–2011), Massimo Busato (2011–2016)
