= 2014 Venetian independence referendum =

Unofficial, non-binding, online and privately organised poll

Venetian independence referendum, 2014
- 16–21 March 2014
- Map of Italy with Veneto highlighted in red.
- Voting system: Simple majority, online voting

Do you want Veneto to be a federal, independent and sovereign state?
Yes	89.1%
No	10.9%
Turnout was 63.2%.

Should Veneto adopt the Euro as its currency if it becomes independent?
Yes	51.4%
No	48.6%
Turnout was 24.6%.

Should Veneto seek to join the European Union if it becomes independent?
Yes	55.7%
No	44.3%
Turnout was 22.3%.

Should Veneto seek to join NATO if it becomes independent?
Yes	64.5%
No	35.5%
Turnout was 19.8%.

The Venetian independence referendum of 2014 was an unofficial, non-binding, online and privately organised poll held among residents of Veneto, one of the 20 regions of Italy, 16–21 March 2014. The vote, known also as the "digital plebiscite" or "Plebiscito.eu", was promoted by Plebiscite 2013, a Venetian nationalist organisation led by Gianluca Busato.

== Turnout and results ==
According to Plebiscito.eu's staff, 2.36 million Venetians (63.2% of all eligible voters) participated in the online referendum and 89.1% of them (that is to say 56.6% of all eligible voters) voted "yes" to independence. P2013 proclaimed Veneto's independence from Italy in Treviso on the night of 21 March.

In the poll, ten "delegates for independence" were elected: Busato was the preferred candidate with 135,306 votes, followed by Stefano Vescovi (48,320), Selena Veronese (46,947), Silvia Gandin (43,025), Lodovico Pizzati (25,731), Gianfranco Favaro (16,670), Raffaele Serafini (16,627), Manuel Carraro (16,627), Gianluca Panto (16,321) and Paolo Bernardini (16,299).

Finally, voters were asked to express their opinion on three "foreign policy issues", were Veneto to become independent: adoption of the Euro (supported by 51.4% of voters), accession to European Union membership (supported by 55.7% of voters) and accession to NATO membership (supported by 64.5% of voters); turnout was however much lower for these three questions (24.6%, 22.3% and 19.8%, respectively).

== Critique of turnout and results ==
Turnout and results were questioned by many news sources based on publicly available website traffic statistics released by Alexa Internet and similar providers. According to the critics, throughout the duration of the poll, the website received approximately 135,000 visits (just 3.6% of eligible voters). Moreover, a significant proportion of this traffic came from outside Italy, with 10% coming from Santiago, Chile.

According to an opinion poll by Ilvo Diamanti's Demos&Pi for La Repubblica taken on 20–21 March, however, 48% of Venetians had voted or had intention to vote in the online referendum, 49% had not voted, and 3% did not answer. Among those voting, 78% favoured independence. Moreover, Diamanti found that 55% of all eligible voters favoured independence, which was opposed by 39%. Other polling firms, including Ixè and Istituto Piepoli, offered comparable data.

Plebiscito.eu, for its part, announced on 29 March that a short report on the referendum by a committee of international observers would be soon presented. The president of the committee, former ambassador of Georgia to Italy, Beglar Davit Tavartkiladze, anticipated that 100% of the voters who had been contacted confirmed to have voted.

In 2014 and 2015, the Plebiscito.eu organizers asserted that the result of the referendum was legitimate and that the Plebiscito.eu referendum committee was entitled to "establish any form of relationship with states and intergovernmental organizations in order to recognise referendum results and therefore the full independence of the Venetian Republic."

== Reactions and aftermath ==
Several international media covered the event. During an interview with foreign journalists on 19 March 2014, Luca Zaia, President of Veneto and leading member of Liga Veneta–Lega Nord, announced that he too had voted (yes) in the online poll and explained that he would seek "total independence" for Veneto.

On 1 April 2014, a committee of the Regional Council of Veneto put forward bills calling for a referendum on independence and on more autonomy for the region. The move was supported by the representatives of Liga Veneta–Lega Nord, Forza Italia (the minority faction), New Centre-Right, Popular Future, Union of the Centre and North-East Union, but opposed by the Democratic Party, Italy of Values and the Federation of the Left. The day after, all the floor leaders of the parties represented in the council (except for the Federation of the Left) officially asked the Italian government to give Veneto the status of a special-statute autonomous region and fiscal autonomy. The final document was approved by Liga Veneta–Lega Nord, Forza Italia (both factions), New Centre Right, Union of the Centre, Italy of Values and North-East Union.

On 28 April, during a visit to Veneto, the Italian Minister of the Interior, Angelino Alfano, acknowledged that "there is a Venetian question, which will be central in the government's relation with regions". In reference to what he called "Agenda Veneto", he said:

"We think that Veneto could be the laboratory for a form of strong and advanced federalism. [...] We cannot close our eyes in front of independentist risings. [...] The answer is dual: enhancing autonomy and improving the government's services".

For his part, Zaia explained to Alfano the "legitimate request of Venetians" for autonomy and independence, and that "the issue of autonomy and the desire of independence of Venetians cannot be resolved with an aspirin", concluding that "if Rome continues to sleep, it is inevitable that Veneto will organise by itself".

On 10 June the Regional Council discussed and passed a law concerning five referendum questions concerning special autonomy. On 12 June the same legislative assembly passed Valdegamberi's 342/2013 bill in order to hold a referendum on the independence (question: "Do you want Veneto to become a sovereign and independent republic?") with 30 yeas, 12 nays and 3 abstentions. On 26 June 2015 the Constitutional Court ruled the independence referendum out as contrary to the Constitution, but authorised one of the five autonomy referendums ("Do you want the Region of Veneto to be granted of further and special forms and conditions of autonomy?").

In March 2016 President Zaia announced that he had written to Prime Minister Matteo Renzi in order to start negotiating both on the organisation of the referendum on autonomy and on the devolution of further powers to Veneto according to article 116 of the Constitution. Zaia proposed holding the referendum on the same day as the 2016 constitutional referendum (which would reduce the regions' powers—article 117, while expanding the powers that can be devolved to regions according to article 116 and creating a regionalised Senate), a notion deemed legally impossible by undersecretary Gianclaudio Bressa, and the negotiations started in May.

According to an opinion poll taken in June, 78.5% of Venetians would take part in an autonomy referendum, 78.4% would vote yes, 3.5% no and 18.1% did not know. According to the same poll, 70.7% of voters would participate also in the constitutional referendum, 41.3% would vote yes, 22.2% no and 36.5% did not know.

Contextually, two bills calling for an independence referendum were introduced in the Regional Council, one by Liga Veneta's Marino Finozzi, Gabriele Michieletto, Alessandro Montagnoli and Luciano Sandonà, with the support of Roberto Ciambetti (President of the Council), and the other by Antonio Guadagnini.
