= Resist Veneto =

Resist Veneto Resistere Veneto
- Leader: Riccardo Szumski
- Founded: 17 June 2025
- Ideology: Populism; Venetian nationalism; Regionalism
- Chamber of Deputies: 0 / 400
- Senate: 0 / 200
- European Parliament: 0 / 76
- Regional Council of Veneto: 2 / 51

Website
- www.resistereveneto.it

Resist Veneto (Italian: Resistere Veneto; abbr. RV) is a populist and Venetian nationalist political party in Veneto, Italy, led by Riccardo Szumski.

== History ==
In 2022, Riccardo Szumski, a physician provisionally struck off the national register due to his positions regarding vaccination, launched a grassroot movement known as "Resist", opposing containment measures during the COVID-19 pandemic. Szumski, who had continuously been mayor, assessor, deputy mayor and again mayor of Santa Lucia di Piave from 1994 to 2022, has a complex political upbringing: Italian Democratic Socialist Party, Liga Veneta–Lega Nord, Forza Italia, again Liga Veneta–Lega Nord and finally Party of Venetians.

In June 2025 Szumski launched Resist Veneto in order to run in the upcoming November regional election, featuring also candidates belonging to Vita (including leader Sara Cunial), Venetian Independence (including its leader Michele Favero, though its most recognisable representative, Alessio Morosin, would run and be elected with Liga Veneta Repubblica) and a number of minor Venetian nationalist parties.

In the election, Szumski surprisingly won 5.1% of the vote, while RV 5.0% and two regional councillors, Szumski himself and Davide Lovat (a former member of Liga Veneta–Lega Nord, founder of the Community Democratic League and candidate for mayor of Vicenza for Veneto State). RV was particularly strong in the province of Treviso (10.2%), especially in its northern part, known as "Sinistra Piave" (from the left bank of Piave river). There the party came first in Szumski's home turf of Santa Lucia di Piave (43.5%) and in small municipalities as Refrontolo (23.0%), Susegana (22.1%), Vazzola (22.0%), Sarmede (21.9%), Revine Lago (21.5%), Mareno di Piave (21.4%), Colle Umberto (20.7%) and Fregona (20.5%), but also notably well in the urban area around Vittorio Veneto (13.4%), Conegliano (13.9%) and San Vendemiano (17.8%). Outside the province of Treviso, the party did best in the provinces of Belluno (6.7%) and Vicenza (4.5%), where Lovat was elected.

== Ideology and political positions ==
Resist Veneto describes itself as a territorial and pluralist political movement centred on Venetian self-government, individual freedom and regional autonomy. Its programme calls for greater control by Veneto over its own resources, economy and development, and presents autonomy as a political right rather than as a concession from the central government. The party also promotes the recognition of Venetian cultural identity, including the Venetian language and the teaching of local history. It has advocated greater autonomy for Venice itself, including a special institutional status for the city.

The party's platform combines regionalism and Venetian nationalism with positions on civil liberties, healthcare, welfare and economic policy. It supports public healthcare and emphasizes informed consent and freedom of choice in healthcare. Its programme also advocates environmental protection, investment in research and technology, support for families and communities, and measures intended to strengthen local economic self-sufficiency. Among its economic proposals are the creation of a complementary regional currency and greater public control over energy resources.

On cultural and social issues, Resist Veneto supports the recognition and promotion of the Venetian language and regional historical heritage. Its programme also refers to the traditional family as an important social institution. On security, it has proposed the creation of a regional volunteer body, the Guardia Civile Veneta, intended to assist with territorial surveillance and urban security.

The movement's political discourse also developed out of Riccardo Szumski's opposition to COVID-19 containment policies and his criticism of compulsory vaccination measures. In its regional programme, Resist Veneto called for greater freedom of choice in healthcare and subsequently its representatives in the Regional Council continued to campaign on vaccination-related issues.

On foreign policy, the movement has opposed increased military spending and the rearmament of European states, while advocating a negotiated settlement to the war in Ukraine and dialogue involving Russia. In February 2026 its two regional councillors voted against a majority motion concerning the war in Ukraine, arguing that a European peace settlement should also involve Russia.

== Election results ==
=== Regional Council of Veneto ===
Election	Leader	Votes	%	Seats	+/–	Position
2025	Riccardo Szumski	83,054	4.96	2 / 51	–	5th
