= Franco Roccon =

Italian politician

Franco Roccon (born 21 January 1960 in Belluno, Veneto) is a Venetist politician.

Having joined Liga Veneta–Lega Nord in the early 1990s, Roccon was elected to the Regional Council of Veneto at the 1995 regional election.

In October 1998 Roccon left Liga Veneta–Lega Nord and was a founding member of Liga Veneta Repubblica (LVR), along with Fabrizio Comencini and other four regional councillors. In the 2000 regional election LVR failed to field a list in the province of Belluno and, thus, Roccon was not re-elected.

In May 2003 Roccon was elected mayor of Castellavazzo (Belluno) with 51.4% of the vote. In April 2008 he was re-elected by a landslide with 62.7% of the vote. Having joined The People of Freedom, he served as president of the provincial public utility until November 2011. During his tenure as president of BIM–GPS he was often criticized by his former colleagues of the League, especially by Gianpaolo Bottacin, president of the Province.

In late 2012 Roccon took part to some events organized by Venetian Independence. On 5 April 2013, under Roccon's leadership, Castellavazzo was the first municipality of Veneto to approve a motion in support of a referendum on the independence of Veneto. Since 2015 Roccon was involved with the LVR in Independence We Veneto, running in the 2015 regional election (4.3% in the province of Belluno) and for mayor of Belluno in 2017 (3.4%).

In March 2019 Roccon represented the LVR at the European Free Alliance's general assembly, during which a motion on Venetian autonomy was approved.

In the 2020 Venetian regional election Roccon was an unsuccessful candidate for the Venetian Autonomy List, sponsored by both the LV and the LVR.
