= Independence We Veneto =

Independence We Veneto Indipendenza Noi Veneto
- President: Luca Azzano Cantarutti
- Vice President: Roberto Agirmo
- Founded: 5 March 2014
- Dissolved: 12 December 2017
- Merged into: Great North
- Ideology: Venetian nationalism Separatism

Independence We Veneto (Italian: Indipendenza Noi Veneto, INV) was a Venetist and separatist political party based in Veneto, Italy.

INV, which was represented in the Regional Council of Veneto by Antonio Guadagnini from June 2015 to March 2016, is part of the larger coalition led by Liga Veneta–Lega Nord and supports Luca Zaia's second government.

== History ==
=== Independent Venetians ===
Independent Venetians (Italian: Veneti Indipendenti) emerged in February 2014 as a split from Venetian Independence (IV), the most established separatist party in Veneto at the time. After an internal struggle and a congress, during which his role of president was cancelled from the party's constitution, Luca Azzano Cantarutti had left the party in January, after a power struggle with Alessio Morosin. The Independent Venetians' party was instrumental in the foundation of "United for Independent Veneto", along with other parties.

=== United for Independent Veneto ===
United for Independent Veneto (Uniti per il Veneto Indipendente) was a coalition of parties launched in Venice on 5 March 2014. Its founding members were:

- Independent Venetians, led by Luca Azzano Cantarutti;
- Veneto State, led by Antonio Guadagnini;
- Liga Veneta Repubblica, led by Fabrizio Comencini;
- Popular Future, led by Stefano Valdegamberi.

=== We Independent Veneto ===
In July 2014 the coalition gave birth to We Independent Veneto (Noi Veneto Indipendente), as a joint list for the 2015 regional election:

- Independent Venetians, led by Luca Azzano Cantarutti;
- Veneto State, led by Antonio Guadagnini;
- Liga Veneta Repubblica, led by Fabrizio Comencini;
- Chiavegato for Independence, led by Lucio Chiavegato;
- North-East Project, led by Mariangelo Foggiato;
- Tea Party Veneto, led by Carlo Sandrin and Michele Varini;
- Pro Veneto, led by Roberto Agirmo.

=== 2015 regional election ===
After the exit of Chiavegato and his group from the alliance and their alignment with Alessio Morosin's Venetian Independence, the remaining six parties of NVI formed a joint list for the 2015 regional election named Independence We Veneto with Zaia, a sort of re-edition of 2010's North-East Union, but with a separatist platform and in support of Luca Zaia, incumbent President of Veneto and candidate of Liga Veneta–Lega Nord.

In the election, the list won 2.7% of the vote (0.2pp more than Venetian Independence) and Antonio Guadagnini of Veneto State was elected regional councillor in the provincial constituency of Vicenza. Soon after being installed, Guadagnini, who was elected vice president of the Regional Council of Veneto, formed a pro-independence "inter-group", which was joined from the start by Stefano Valdegamberi, re-elected councillor in Zaia's personal list, and Massimiliano Barison of Forza Italia.

=== Recent events ===
In March 2016, Guadagnini severed his ties with INV and changed his affiliation in the Council to We Are Veneto, causing a strong reaction by INV leaders.

In May 2017, the party was a founding member of Great North (GN), a liberal and federalist party. This alignment would be short-lived: in November 2017 INV broke with GN, after the latter had welcomed Veneto First and former members of Veneto State, without consulting and/or engaging INV. Moreover, INV criticised GN's anti-Lega Nord stance: while differing from that party on several issues, INV wanted to continue to cooperate with it.

In the 2017 local elections, the party fielded lists only in a few places, including Belluno (3.8% under the "Bellunese Civilisation" banner) and Marcon (3.0%).

After having officially presented its symbol for the 2018 general election, INV chose not to participate.
