= List of political parties in Veneto =

This is the list of political parties in Veneto, Italy.

The region's five largest parties are Liga Veneta–Lega Nord, the Brothers of Italy, the Democratic Party, Forza Italia and Resist Veneto.

In the latest regional election, held in November 2025, a centre-right coalition, composed of Liga Veneta, the Brothers of Italy, Forza Italia and minor parties won virtually 66% of the vote.

== Parties ==
=== Major parties ===
More than 20% in the 2025 regional election (or at least 15 regional councillors):

- Venetian League–League (Łiga Vèneta–Lega)

=== Medium parties ===
Between 4% and 20% in the 2025 regional election (or at least 5 regional councillors):

- Brothers of Italy (Fratelli d'Italia)
- Democratic Party (Partito Democratico)

=== Minor parties ===
Between 1% and 4% in the 2025 regional election (or at least 1 regional councillor):

- Forward Italy (Forza Italia)
- Resist Veneto (Resistere Veneto)
- Greens and Left Alliance (Alleanza Verdi e Sinistra), including:
  - The Veneto We Want (Il Veneto che vogliamo)
  - Green Europe (Europa Verde)
  - Italian Left (Sinistra Italiana)
- Five Star Movement (Movimento Cinque Stelle)
- United for Manildo fro President, including
  - Action (Azione)
  - Italy Alive (Italia Viva)
  - More Europe (Più Europa)
  - Italian Socialist Party (Partito Socialista Italiano)
- Republic Venetian League (Łiga Vèneta Republega), including:
  - Venetian Independence (Indipendenza Veneta)
- Union of the Centre (Unione di Centro)
- The Venetian Civic Lists (Le Civiche Venete)

=== Other Venetist parties ===
Venetian nationalism is a regional political movement which arose in Veneto in the 1980s. Minor Venetist parties have included:

- North-East Union (Unione NordEst)
- North-East Project (Progetto NordEst)
- Venetian National Party (Partito Nazionale Veneto)
- Autonomous Veneto League (Liga Veneto Autonomo)
- Veneto State (Veneto Stato)
- Venetian Left (Sanca Veneta)
- Veneto First (Prima il Veneto)
- Tosi List for Veneto (Lista Tosi per il Veneto)
- We Are Veneto (Siamo Veneto)
- Party of Venetians (Partito dei Veneti)

A list of former and current Venetist political parties is available at Venetian nationalism.

== See also ==
- List of political parties in Italy
