= Community Democratic League =

Italian political party

The Community Democratic League (Lega Democratica Comunitaria, LDC) was a Venetist and Christian-socialist political party active in Veneto.

The party was founded in July 2011 by some splinters of Liga Veneta–Lega Nord (LV–LN) led by Davide Lovat. Lovat had been an activist of Liga Veneta in the province of Vicenza for 18 years before becoming a leading voice against the party leadership. A keen Venetist and left-winger, in February 2011 he was expelled from the party. Some months on, along with other splinters from LV–LN, Lovat started organizing the LDC.

The name "Community Democratic League" was chosen by Lovat, who has studied political science and theology, as a reference both to the "National Democratic League" of Romolo Murri, a radical priest, and the National League for Democracy of Nobel Peace Prize Aung San Suu Kyi. Lovat set the party in the tradition of Christian socialism and early Venetian nationalism. According to its manifesto, the LDC supported regionalism, the reform of the Italian Constitution following the German model, restrictions to immigration on economic grounds, and European integration in the form of the Gaullist "Europe of Peoples and Nations". The party opposed xenophobia, neo-liberalism, the exploitation of religions for political purposes, and the influence of the United States over Europe.

As soon as in September the LDC became an associate party of Magdi Allam's I Love Italy party, while in October the party was integrated in the larger Venetian Project, including other small Venetist, autonomist, independentist and traditionalist parties and cultural associations.

In December 2012 the LDC was integrated into Veneto State (VS) and Lovat was chosen as the party's candidate for mayor of Vicenza.

In 2025, Lovat was elected to the Regional Council of Veneto as a member of the populist Venetian nationalist Resist Veneto party.
