= Giorgio Vido =

Italian politician

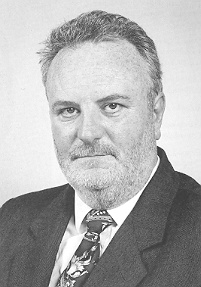
Giorgio Vido

Giorgio Vido (born 1 April 1941 in Padua, died 8 December 2018) was an Italian politician. Elected to the Italian Chamber of Deputies for the Liga Veneta-Lega Nord, he left the party in 1994.

In 2000, he contributed to the foundation of the Fronte Marco Polo with Fabio Padovan. After a dismal result in the 2000 regional elections (1.2%), he managed to merge his party with the Veneti d'Europa. The new party was called Liga Fronte Veneto, and Giorgio Vido was national secretary from 2001 to 2003.
