= We Are Veneto =

We Are Veneto Siamo Veneto
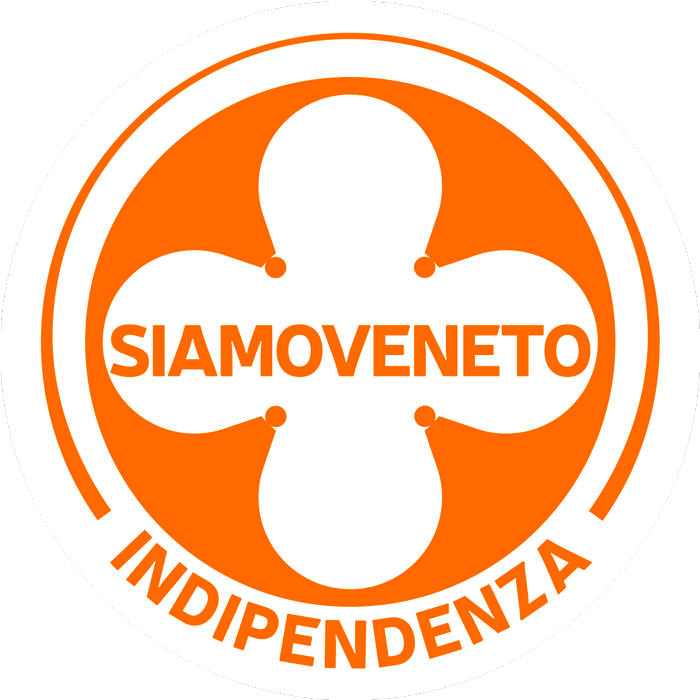
- Leader: Antonio Guadagnini
- Founded: March 2016
- Dissolved: October 2019
- Split from: Independence We Veneto
- Succeeded by: Party of Venetians
- Ideology: Venetian nationalism Separatism
- European affiliation: none
- International affiliation: none

Website
- http://www.siamoveneto.org

We Are Veneto (Siamo Veneto, SV) is a Venetian nationalist and separatist political party in Italy, based in Veneto.

== History ==
The party was formed in March 2016 when Antonio Guadagnini, leader of Veneto State (VS) and member of the Regional Council of Veneto elected on the Independence We Veneto's slate, changed his affiliation in the Council and established the new party. SV was the practical successor of VS, and, other than Guadagnini, its founding members included Marco Busato (a former treasurer of VS) and Giacomo Mirto (a former leader of Independentist Youth).

At some point, the party was joined also by Lucio Chiavegato.

In July 2018 SV signed a political pact with Venetian Independence (IV), Veneto's leading separatist party.

Between April and October 2019 SV was a founding member of the Party of Venetians.
