= Davide Bendinelli =

Italian politician from Veneto

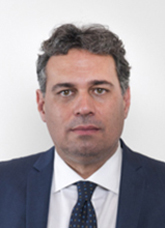
Davide Bendinelli daticamera 2018

Davide Bendinelli (born 19 October 1974) is an Italian politician from Veneto.

Having joined Forza Italia, he served as minister of the Province of Verona in 1999–2009 and mayor of Garda in 2001–2010. In the 2010 regional election he was elected to the Regional Council of Veneto for The People of Freedom and in 2014 he was appointed regional minister of Social Affairs in Zaia I Government.

== Biography ==
Born in Caprino Veronese (Verona), he holds a degree in economics and business. He joined Forza Italia (1994) and served as councilor for tourism on the Province of Verona Council, chaired by Aleardo Merlin, from 1999 to 2004.

In the 2001 municipal elections in Veneto, he ran for mayor of the municipality of Garda, Veneto, backed by a civic list, and was elected mayor with 64.81% of the vote. In the subsequent election in 2006, he was re-elected mayor with 80.97% of the vote.

In the 2004 local elections, he ran for the Province of Verona Council on the Forza Italia ticket in the Bardolino district in support of center-right presidential candidate Elio Mosele. He was elected provincial councilor with 37.18% of the vote and was subsequently appointed provincial councilor for Construction and Heritage in the administration headed by Elio Mosele.

In 2009, he joined the merger of Forza Italia into the The People of Freedom party, and in the 2010 regional elections in Veneto, he ran on one of its slates as part of the campaign led by Luca Zaia, Minister of Agriculture, Food, and Forestry. He was elected to the Veneto Regional Council in the Province of Verona district with 24,580 votes and currently chairs the 4th Council Committee.

On November 16, 2013, following the suspension of the The People of Freedom activities, he joined Silvio Berlusconi revived Forza Italia, becoming the party’s regional deputy coordinator in Veneto and provincial coordinator.

On October 4, 2014, he was appointed councilor for social services in the Veneto Regional Council chaired by Luca Zaia.

He was not re-elected in the same district on the Forza Italia (2013) ticket in the 2015 regional elections in Veneto, as the 7,210 votes he received were not enough to secure a seat.

After serving as a city councilor from 2011 to 2016, he was re-elected mayor of Garda in the 2016 municipal elections with 52.68% of the vote, and was re-elected in 2021 with 72.78% of the vote.

In the 2018 general election, he ran for the Chamber of Deputies (Italy) in the single-member constituency of Veneto 2 - 11 (Villafranca di Verona), supported by the center-right coalition as a member of Forza Italia. He was elected to the Chamber of Deputies with 50.52% of the vote, defeating the candidates from the Five Star Movement, Francesca Businarolo (25.56%), and the center-left, Isabella Roveroni (16.51%). However, he decided to continue serving as mayor as well.

He served as regional coordinator for Forza Italia in Veneto from October 31, 2018, to November 19, 2019.

On December 12, 2019, he announced his departure from Forza Italia and his move to Italia Viva, a liberal and centrist party founded by Matteo Renzi, where he became regional coordinator for Veneto alongside Martina Cancian, and was confirmed as sole coordinator in 2023.

In the 2022 early general election, he ran again for the Chamber of Deputies on the Azione–Italia Viva electoral list, both in the single-member constituency Veneto 2–07 (Villafranca di Verona) and in the multi-member constituencies Veneto 2–01 and Veneto 2–03, where he was listed second behind Elena Bonetti ; in the single-member district, he received 7.33% of the vote and was decisively defeated by the center-right candidate, Ciro Maschio of Fratelli d'Italia (64.42%), and received less than half the votes of the center-left candidate, Federica Foglia (16.97%) , while in the multi-member district he was not elected, thus remaining excluded from the 19th legislature of Italian Parliament.

In May 2024, during the European elections, he ran as a candidate for the United States of Europe (electoral list) list (comprising +Europa, Italia Viva, and other parties) in the northeastern constituency.With over 7,600 votes, he finished in second place, but the list failed to clear the electoral threshold.
