= Lodovico Pizzati =

Italian politician

- Born: 3 September 1973 (age 52); Venice, Italy
- Occupations: politician, teacher, editor

Lodovico Pizzati (born 3 September 1973) is an Italian economist, politician, and university professor. He currently teaches at the University of Southern California in the Economics department, where he teaches a combination of upper and lower level courses.

== Biography ==
Pizzati was born in Valdagno, the son of Giulio Pizzati, one of the earliest members of Liga Veneta (and later of Liga Federativa Veneta), In 1990 Lodovico was an activist of Veneto Autonomous Region Movement, his father's party at the time. Shortly after, he went to California, United States to study at a local high school. Having moved to Washington, D.C., he earned a Ph.D. in economics at Georgetown University. In 2006 Pizzati returned in Veneto because he wanted his children to learn the Venetian language and to live the Venetian way. From 2006 to 2013 he was a contract professor of economics at Ca' Foscari University of Venice. Since 2013 he returned to the United States as a professor of economic statistics at California State University in Los Angeles, California, and later at the University of Southern California.

== Politics ==
A lapsed voter (living abroad for years), Pizzati had voted just twice during his life (Liga Veneta Repubblica in 1999 and North-East Project in 2006) before entering politics. In 2008 he joined the Venetian National Party (PNV) and was the party's president from 2009. In September 2010 Pizzati was elected secretary of Veneto State (VS), the result of the merger of the PNV with other separatist groups. As VS leader he conceived some provoking initiatives, such as the "Monument of the Entrepreneur" (exposed in Arzignano in protest to Italian high taxation on business) and the so-called "fiscal trips" (bus trips to neighbouring Austria and Slovenia, during which participants had the chance to open bank accounts). In October 2011, after an internal struggle, Pizzati was replaced as secretary by Antonio Guadagnini. In May 2012 Pizzati switched to Venetian Independence (IV) and was elected secretary of the new party. In July 2013 Pizzati, who had lost a key vote during an IV's congress in June, launched Plebiscite 2013 (P2013), a cross-party nonpartisan committee for a referendum on independence, of which he became spokesperson; subsequently, in late August, he was dismissed as secretary of IV.

== Language and editing ==
Among other things, Pizzati has been one of the six experts appointed by Veneto Region to fix the rules of standard Venetian language and the official Venetian names of all 581 municipalities of Veneto, the producer of the Venetian version of Clifford the Big Red Dog, and an editor of the Venetian Wikipedia.
