= Sergio Reolon =

Italian politician

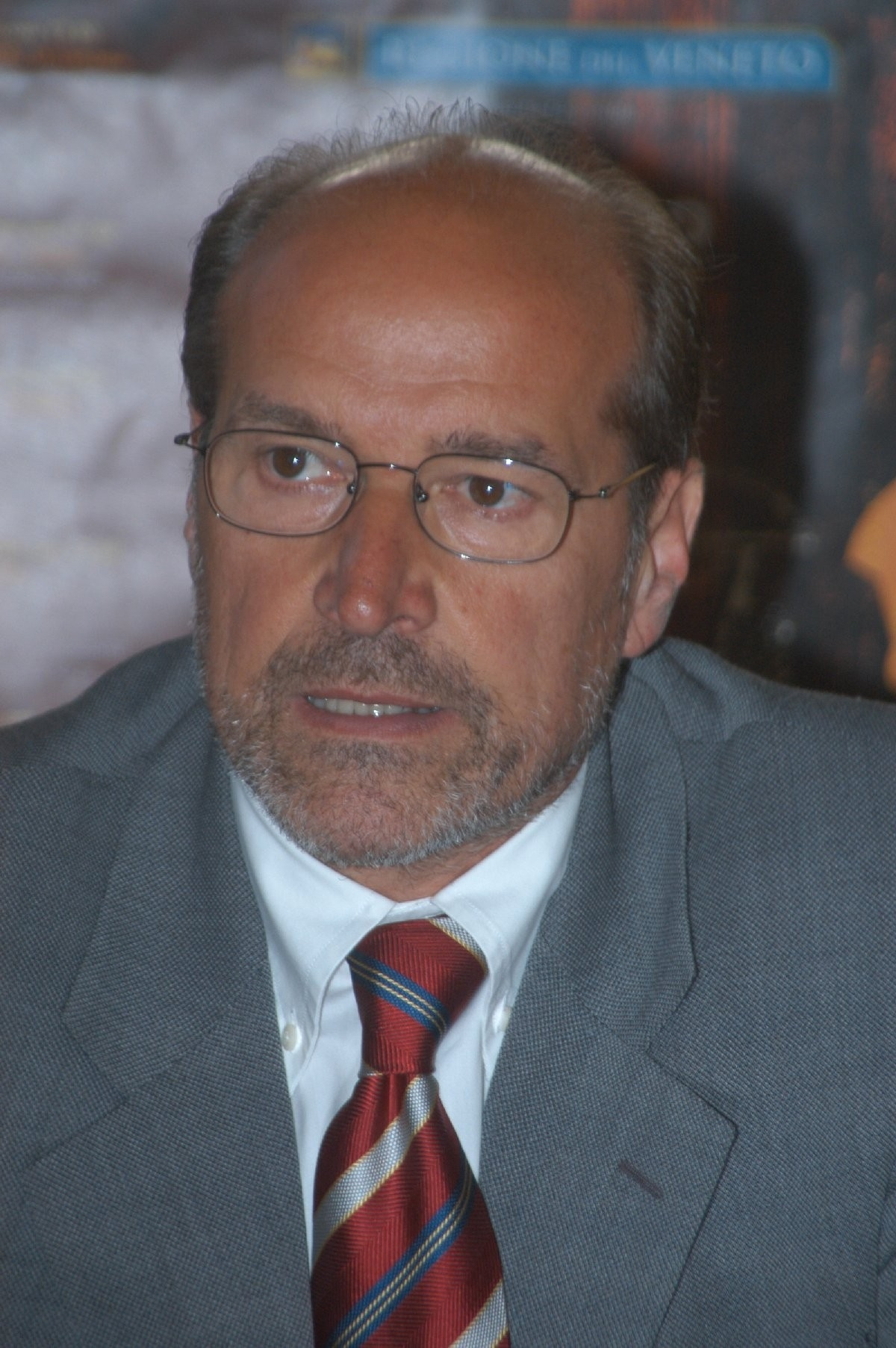
Sergio Reolon

Sergio Reolon (22 May 1951 – 20 January 2017) was an Italian politician from the Veneto region.

Reolon was born in Caracas to an Italian family hailing from the Province of Belluno and lived part of his youth in Venezuela and Rhodesia, where his parents went to seek fortune as immigrants. Following his return to the Veneto, region Reolon joined the Italian Communist Party in 1972 and became provincial secretary of the party in Belluno in 1978. After a twenty-two-year experience as provincial councillor and minister, Reolon was elected president of the Province of Belluno in 2004, but was ousted in 2009 by Gianpaolo Bottacin. In the 2010 regional election he was elected to the Regional Council of Veneto for the Democratic Party.

Reolon died on 20 January 2017 at the age of 65.
