= Alessio Morosin =

Italian lawyer and politician

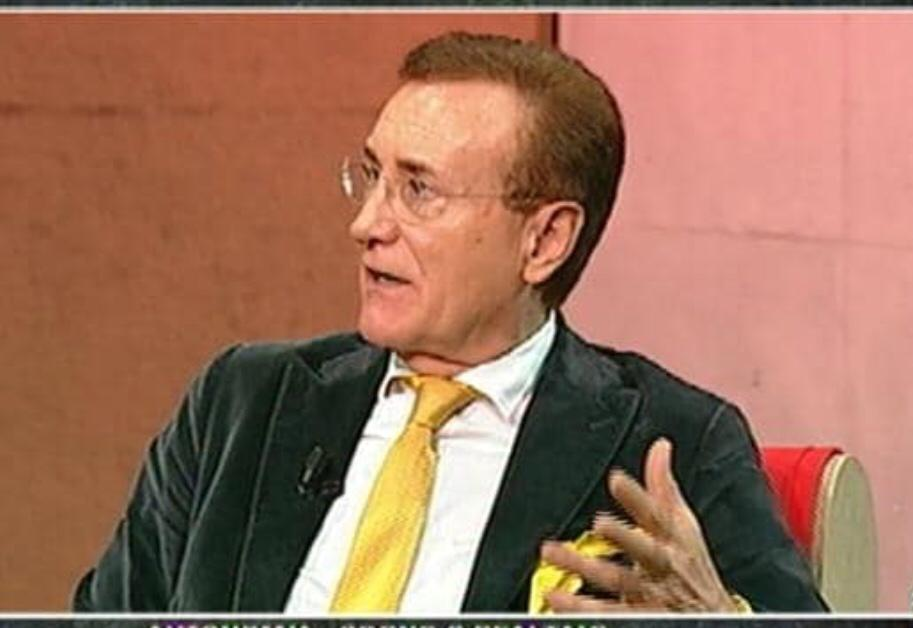
Alessio Morosin

Alessio Morosin (born 20 June 1955 in Noale) is an Italian lawyer and politician.

He joined Liga Veneta–Lega Nord in the early 1990s and was elected to the Regional Council of Veneto at the 1995 regional election.

He made his name in Venetist circles for being the author of resolution 42/1998 (title: "Yesterday's and today's peoples and the right to self-determination"), concerning the "self-determination" of the Venetian people. The resolution read: "The Venetian people […] invokes its right to a democratic and direct referendum for the free expression of its right to self-determination". The resolution was approved by a majority vote in the Council on 22 April 1998.

His strong Venetism eventually led Morosin to leave Liga Veneta–Lega Nord in October 1998 to join Liga Veneta Repubblica (LVR), along with Fabrizio Comencini and other four regional councillors. In 2000 he missed re-election and was an unsuccessful candidate in many other elections.

In 2004, when LVR secretary Ettore Beggiato and a majority of party members switched to North-East Project (PNE), Morosin remained loyal to Comencini and was elected party president, a post he held until 2007. Disillusioned with traditional Venetism, he watched with great interest the birth of the Venetian National Party (PNV) in 2008 and finally joined Veneto State (VS) at its founding congress in September 2010. A year later, during a party congress in October 2011, he ran for party president of VS, but lost to Lucio Chiavegato. In May 2012 Morosin switched to Venetian Independence (IV) and was elected honorary president of the new party.

Having become the leader of IV at the beginning of 2014, he recruited Chiavegato and Fabio Padovan into the party and ran for President of Veneto in the 2015 regional election. In the event, he and the party obtained 2.5% of the vote, but no seats in the Regional Council.
