= Fronte Marco Polo =

Marco Polo Front Fronte Marco Polo
- Founded: 1999
- Dissolved: 2001
- Merged into: Liga Fronte Veneto
- Ideology: Venetian nationalism Autonomism

The Marco Polo Front (Italian: Fronte Marco Polo, FMP) was an autonomist and Venetist political party active in Veneto, named after explorer Marco Polo.

Fabio Padovan, leader of the European Federalist Free Entrepreneurs (LIFE) and former deputy of Liga Veneta–Lega Nord, and Giorgio Vido, another former deputy of LV–LN, formed FMP in 1999 in view of the 2000 regional election. Padovan gained 1.7% of the vote in the election, while FMP stopped at 1.3%. In 2001 the party was merged into Liga Fronte Veneto.

== Sources ==
- Francesco Jori, Dalla Łiga alla Lega. Storia, movimenti, protagonisti, Marsilio, Venice 2009
- Ezio Toffano, Short History of the Venetian Autonomism, Raixe Venete
