= Venetian National Party =

Venetian National Party Partito Nasionał Veneto
- Founded: May 2007
- Dissolved: 12 September 2011
- Merged into: Veneto State
- Ideology: Venetism; Separatism; Libertarianism; Liberalism

Website
- http://www.pnveneto.org/

The Venetian National Party (Partito Nasionał Veneto, PNV) was a Venetist, separatist and libertarian political party active in Veneto, Lombardy and Friuli-Venezia Giulia. In September 2010 the party suspended its activities and its members joined Veneto State. In May 2012 most of its former leaders seceded from it and formed Venetian Independence.

== History ==
=== Background and foundation ===
The party was founded in 2007 by Gianluca Busato (who had been a founding member of the Venetians Movement in 2006), Claudio Ghiotto (also known as Claudio Hütte) and Alessia Bellon. The PNV was indeed a split of the Venetians Movement, whose leader Patrik Riondato did not want to actively participate to elective politics, but soon drew people from libertarian circles.

At the first party congress, which was held on 18 May 2008 in Castelfranco Veneto, Busato was elected secretary, whereas Paolo Bernardini was elected president.

=== 2009 provincial elections ===
In 2009 the PNV took part for the first time in an election, by presenting candidates and lists for the provincial elections in Padua and Venice,

According to party officials, during the campaign, members and supporters experienced several interferences from the local Carabinieri. Gianluca Busato was interrogated at a Carabinieri's station of Limena (PD). On 13 May Stefano Venturato, candidate for president in Padua, started a hunger strike to protest against the misinformation of the local newspapers about the PNV and the interferences of the Italian police. Finally, on 14 May, the PNV's headquarters in Treviso were ransacked by Carabinieri.

The week before the election was also marked by tragedy. One of the party's candidates, Angela Cristina Oliveira da Silva, was killed in the explosion of Air France's flight from Rio de Janeiro to Paris. She was returning from her native Brazil to participate in the last week of campaigning.

Election results were highly disappointing as the PNV gained just 0.3% of the vote in Padua and 0.2% in Venice, but it did better in some municipal contests.

=== 2010 regional election ===
At a congress in October 2009, in Limena, which was attended by several Venetist leaders, such as Patrik Riondato of Venetians Movement and Ettore Beggiato of North-East Project, the PNV chose to run the forthcoming regional election with an independentist candidate. Gianluca Busato was re-elected secretary, while Lodovico Pizzati (son of Giulio, leader of Liga Federativa Veneta in the 1980s) was elected president. Paolo Bernardini was appointed honorary president.

The party decided to choose its candidate for President of Veneto through an on-line open primary. Five candidates ran: Claudio Ghiotto (representing the libertarian wing of the party), Sabrina Tessari, Stefano Ventuarato, Alberto Gardin (leader of Venetian Independence and, later, candidate of the Party of the Venetians) and Michele Milanetto (a former member of the Democrats of the Left, on behalf of the party's left-wing). Soon Milanetto withdrew in favour of Tessari, while Venturato did the same to endorse Ghiotto, who was thus the front-runner. More than 10,000 people voted in the primary and Ghiotto won the nomination with 54.8% of the vote, ahead of Tessari (45.0%) and Gardin (0.2%). Shortly afterwards Ghiotto chose not to run and opened the way for the bid of his running-mate, Gianluca Panto, in accordance with party rules.

On election day, Panto managed to win a mere 0.4% of the vote, while the party was stuck at 0.3%. It was a big blow for the PNV, but its members saw it as the first step toward success. Busato resigned from secretary, and was replaced by Panto at a party congress in May.

=== Veneto State ===
On 12 September 2010 the PNV was merged with the Party of the Venetians (PdV) to form Veneto State (VS). Lodovico Pizzati, president of the PNV, was elected secretary of the new party. Gianluca Busato (PNV) was elected treasurer and Giustino Cherubin (PdV) president.

With the merger of the PNV into the new party, the website of the PNV was transformed into "Press News Veneto" (PNV), an online newspaper edited by Busato, covering Venetian, European, international, economic, cultural, political and, especially, separatist issues. The PNV magazine is quite independent from VS, as exposed also by the brief exit of Busato from the party in January 2011, and the critical views of the new party leadership elected in October 2011. Since then, the website became also the voice of the libertarian wing of the party, represented also by Pizzati, who had been replaced as secretary by Antonio Guadagnini.

In May 2012, after almost a year of clashes with the new leadership, most former PNV members left VS and formed Venetian Independence (IV).

== Ideology and factions ==
The party campaigned for independence for the so-called Venetia, a country that would be composed of all the territories of the historical Venetian Republic, covering the current Veneto, Friuli-Venezia Giulia, some provinces of Lombardy (Brescia, Bergamo, Cremona and Mantova) and a portion of Trentino (see chart), in contrast with those Venetist parties, such as Liga Veneta–Lega Nord, currently campaigning for federal reform.

The core principles of the PNV included: individual rights, including the right to life, private property and the pursuit of happiness (a clear reference to the United States Declaration of Independence); the refusal of any discrimination based on race, sex, religion, language, etc.; nonviolence, democratic legitimacy and non aggression; respect of international law, the Universal Declaration of Human Rights and, mainly, self-determination. The party proposed an independent Veneto, "tolerant and open to Europe" and takes example from the Scottish National Party, the Basque National Party, and Catalan nationalists.

The PNV early leader Bernardini was essentially a libertarian and most of party members, notably including Gianluca Panto, Claudio Ghiotto and Lodovico Pizzati, reflected his economic and political ideas. The party's core was indeed represented by the Venetian Libertarian Party envisioned and led by Ghiotto. However the party was open to people of all backgrounds.

The party proposed a flat tax at 20%, to be reduced over a few years to 15%, something that would be possible only in case of independence.

== Leadership ==
- Secretary: Gianluca Busato (2008–2010), Gianluca Panto (2010, office suspended)
  - Deputy Secretary: Stefano Venturato (2008–2010, office suspended)
- President: Paolo Bernardini (2008–2009), Lodovico Pizzati (2009–2010, office suspended)
  - Vice President: Claudio Ghiotto (2009–2010, office suspended)
  - Honorary President: Paolo Bernardini (2009–2010, office suspended)
- Treasurer: Ivano Durante (2008–2009), Stefano Venturato (2009–2010), Gianluca Busato (2010, office suspended)
