= Fabio Padovan =

Italian politician

- Born: 11 September 1955 (age 71); Conegliano, Italy
- Occupation: Politician

Fabio Padovan (born 11 September 1955, in Conegliano) is an Italian entrepreneur and politician.

== Political career ==
In the early 1990s Padovan joined Liga Veneta–Lega Nord and was elected to the Chamber of Deputies in the 1992 general election. In early 1994, when Lega Nord entered in alliance with Silvio Berlusconi's Forza Italia, he left in protest the party. Some months later, Padovan founded, along with other Venetist entrepreneurs, the European Federalist Free Entrepreneurs (LIFE), an organization defending the little and medium-sized industries in Veneto.

In 2000 Padovan launched a new Venetist and independentist party called Fronte Marco Polo. In the 2000 regional election the party gained 1.2% in Veneto and no seats. Since then, Padovan was briefly a member of Liga Fronte Veneto and, then, became very close to the Venetian National Party and, finally, Veneto State.
