= Luca Azzano Cantarutti =

Italian politician

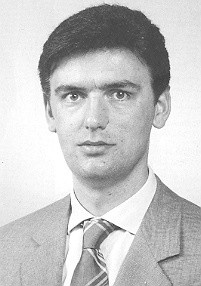
Luca Azzano Cantarutti in 1994

Luca Azzano Cantarutti (born 18 December 1963 in Pordenone) is a Venetian independentist, Venetist politician and lawyer.

In the early 1990s Azzano Cantarutti joined Liga Veneta–Lega Nord in the province of Rovigo. At the 1994 general election he was elected to the Italian Chamber of Deputies in the single-seat constituency of Adria. In July 1995 he left the party and joined the parliamentary group of Federalists and Liberal Democrats (FLD), being a member of the Federalist Italian League (LIF). Finally, in December of that year he switched to the Christian Democratic Centre (CCD) along with other LIF MPs. At the 1996 election he was the only member of LIF to stand for re-election under the party's banner, but got just 2.8% of the vote in his single-seat constituency of Adria.

After staying for years out of politics, Azzano Cantarutti joined Veneto State, the joint Venetist-separatist party campaigning for outright independence of Veneto. In May 2012 he was a founding member of Venetian Independence, a split of Veneto State, and was elected president of the new party. In February 2014 Cantarutti led a group of splinters out of Venetian Independence and launched the alternative Independent Venetians, of which he was elected president.

In the 2015 regional election he was a candidate of the Independence We Veneto list (in support of Luca Zaia's second term as President), but was not elected.
