= Giuseppe Berlato Sella =

Italian politician

Giuseppe Berlato Sella (born 20 October 1939) is an Italian politician from Veneto.

He was born in San Vito di Leguzzano.

A long-time Christian Democrat, Berlato Sella was continuously municipal councillor of Schio from 1975 to 2004 and Mayor from 1987 to 2004. In 1994, after the dissolution of Christian Democracy, he joined the Italian People's Party. From 2000 to 2005 he was president of the regional association of mayors. In 2005 he was elected to the Regional Council of Veneto for Democracy is Freedom – The Daisy and was re-elected in 2010 for the Democratic Party.
