= North-East Union =

The North-East Union (Unione Nord-Est) was a Venetist political party active in Veneto.

The party was formed in 1996 by splinters from Liga Veneta–Lega Nord led by Adriano Bertaso, a regional councillor. In the 1996 general election the party won 2.0% of the vote for the Chamber of Deputies, by running only in the Verona–Padua–Vicenza–Rovigo constituency (3.4%), and 2.6% for the Senate. In 1999 Bertaso led the Union into the Liga Veneta Repubblica (LVR) of Fabrizio Comencini, but soon after left it and re-organized his party, which is currently a minor political force in Veneto.

In the 2004 provincial election the party was revived and won 1.9% of the vote in Verona. In 2009 the UNE gained 1.8%.

In the 2010 regional election the party supported the candidacy of Antonio De Poli (UDC) for President. The UNE logo was used as common symbol of the joint Venetist list formed by the UNE, North-East Project (PNE), Liga Veneta Repubblica (LVR) and Venetian Agreement (IV). The list won 1.5% of vote regionally, with peaks of 1.9% and 1.8% in the provinces of Treviso and Belluno, and Mariangelo Foggiato (PNE) was elected to the Council.

In the 2011 provincial election of Treviso the UNE won 2.4% of the vote and the PNE lost all its provincial councillors.

In the run-up of the 2015 regional election the PNE, the LVR and other Venetist parties formed a joint list named Independence We Veneto, a sort of re-edition of 2010's UNE, but with a separatist platform and in support of Luca Zaia, incumbent President of Veneto and candidate of Liga Veneta–Lega Nord. The UNE joined forces with Flavio Tosi, a former leader of Liga Veneta, and his Tosi List for Veneto instead, but obtained a mere 0.6% of the vote and no seats in the Council.

== Sources ==
- Francesco Jori, Dalla Łiga alla Lega. Storia, movimenti, protagonisti, Marsilio, Venice 2009
- Ezio Toffano, Short History of Venetian Autonomism, Raixe Venete
