= Gustavo Franchetto =

Italian politician from Veneto

Gustavo Franchetto (Verona, 21 January 1953) is an Italian politician from Veneto.

A long-time Christian Democrat, he was first elected to the Regional Council of Veneto in 2000 for Together for Veneto, a centrist alliance comprising the Italian People's Party, The Democrats and Italian Renewal. In 2005 he was re-elected for Democracy is Freedom – The Daisy and then joined the Democratic Party. In 2008 he decided to leave the Democrats and to join Italy of Values instead. Re-elected in 2010, he served as floor leader of his new party.
