= Liga Veneta Repubblica =

- Secretary: Gianluigi Sette
- President: Fabrizio Comencini
- Founded: 5 October 1998
- Split from: Liga Veneta
- Headquarters: via Catania, 11; 37138 Verona
- Ideology: Venetian nationalism; Regionalism; Autonomism
- European affiliation: European Free Alliance (until 2022)
- Chamber of Deputies: 0 / 400
- Senate: 0 / 200
- European Parliament: 0 / 76
- Regional Council of Veneto: 1 / 51

Website
- www.ligavenetarepubblica.org

Liga Veneta Repubblica (Venetian: Łiga Vèneta Repùblega; English: Republic Venetian League; abbr. LVR) is a Venetist political party in Veneto, Italy. The party maintains a mildly separatist position and campaigns for the self-government of Veneto.

The party's founder and long-time leader is Fabrizio Comencini. The LVR emerged in 1998 as a split from Liga Veneta (LV), the "national section" of Lega Nord in Veneto. Originally named Liga Veneta Repubblica, it changed its name to Veneti d'Europa (after the merger with Future Veneto in 2000) and Liga Fronte Veneto (after the merger with Fronte Marco Polo in 2001). It finally assumed again the original title in 2007. Between 1998 and 2000 the party included seven regional councillors, three deputies and four senators (all LV defectors).

== History ==
=== Foundation and early years ===
In September 1998, after prolonged bickering with federal leader Umberto Bossi, Fabrizio Comencini, who had been national secretary of Liga Veneta (LV) since 1994, tried to lead the party out of Lega Nord (LN), a federation of regional parties. This move was opposed by Bossi's loyalists and he was finally expelled from the party and replaced by Gian Paolo Gobbo as leader of the LV.

Subsequently, six out of seven members of LV–LN's group in the Regional Council of Veneto — Fabrizio Comencini, Ettore Beggiato, Alessio Morosin, Mariangelo Foggiato, Alberto Poirè, Michele Munaretto and Franco Roccon — left the party and launched Liga Veneta Repubblica (LVR), which was initially intended to be the legal continuation and legitimate heir of the LV. Another councillor, Adriano Bertaso of North-East Union, who had earlier left the LV, joined the party. Comencini's followers represented the more Venetist and separatist wing of the LV, while those who remained were mainly fiscal federalists and Padanists. The former were also keen on an alliance with the centre-right Pole of Freedoms coalition in Veneto in support of President Giancarlo Galan, with whom Comencini signed a pact in August 1999. The LVR, which was soon joined by three deputies and four senators, made its electoral debut in late 1998 in the municipal election in San Bonifacio, where the party gained 20.9% of the vote and was decisive for the election of the centre-left candidate for mayor. Despite the entity of the split among elects, most voters of the LV remained loyal to Gobbo and, ultimately, Bossi.

In the 1999 European Parliament election the LVR won 3.5% of the vote in Veneto, far less than the LV, which gained a disappointing 10.7%, but proved its resilience. However, the LVR had some local strongholds in 1999 municipal elections: in the province of Treviso, 62.6% and elected mayor in Spresiano, 24.6% in Resana, 11.7% in Cavaso del Tomba and 10.4% in Riese Pio X; in the province of Vicenza, 34.8% and elected mayor in Chiuppano, 21.6% in Camisano Vicentino, 15.8% in Torri di Quartesolo, 15.5% in Creazzo, 14.6% in Monticello Conte Otto, 12.8% in Malo and 11.8% in Schio; in the province of Verona, 44.1% in Arcole and 12.6% in Cologna Veneta.

=== From Veneti d'Europa to Liga Fronte Veneto ===
Veneti d'Europa

For the 2000 regional election, the LV entered an alliance with the Pole of Freedoms that excluded the LVR. The party, whose name was changed to Veneti d'Europa, won 2.4% of the vote and failed to overcome the 3% threshold, also due to the presence of another Venetist party, Fronte Marco Polo (1.2%), as well as the electoral recovery of the LV (12.0%). The name Veneti d'Europa (Venetians for Europe) was chosen as the LVR had merged with Giuseppe Ceccato's Future Veneto, member of the Autonomists for Europe, a 1999 federation of splinter groups from the LN.

Liga Fronte Veneto

In 2001, the party, at the time led by Venetist historian Beggiato, was merged with Fronte Marco Polo into the new Liga Fronte Veneto, even though in some local contexts it started to use its original name and symbol again. Giorgio Vido, who hailed from Fronte Marco Polo, was elected national secretary and Comencini national president. In the 2001 general election Bepin Segato, a separatist activist of the Venetian Most Serene Government in jail for having opposed Italian national unity, was a party candidate for the Senate. Despite gaining 5.6% of the vote for the Chamber of Deputies — notably, 11.5% in the single-seat constituency around Montebelluna, 11.0% in that of Vittorio Veneto, 10.9% in that of Thiene, 10.1% in that of Oderzo and 10.0% in that of Conegliano — and 4.9% for the Senate in Veneto (mainly disgruntled voters of the LV, after the alliance with Silvio Berlusconi's Forza Italia).

In 2003 Beggiato replaced Vido as national secretary in a time when the party was not represented in the top elective bodies and was shrinking in popular support. In 2004 Beggiato tried to lead the party into North-East Project (PNE), but PNE leader Giorgio Panto wanted LFV members to join not as a party but as individuals. Comencini ruled out the idea, that would have meant giving up the party's identity. After a tumultuous congress, a group led by Beggiato, Foggiato and Munaretto switched to PNE, while Comencini was elected national secretary and Morosin national president.

During this time, the party did occasionally better than the LV in local elections. This was the case of Cittadella in 2002 (14.9% over 5.5%) and San Bonifacio in 2004 (17.8% over 4.7%): in both cases, LVR candidates, Massimo Bitonci and Silvano Polo respectively, were elected mayors in run-offs. Bitonci, who re-joined the LV, was re-elected in 2007, while Polo did not stand for re-election and the LVR supported the defeated centre-left candidate in 2009.

=== Decline and return to Liga Veneta Repubblica ===
Alternative logo

In the 2005 regional election, the party was part of the centre-left coalition, winning a mere 1.2% of the vote, while the LV surged to 14.7% and PNE obtained 5.4% and two regional councillors — 16.1% and Foggiato in the province of Treviso —, and being excluded again from the Regional Council. For the 2006 general election Comencini forged an alliance with The Union, the centre-left coalition led by Romano Prodi, and the party's score dropped to 0.7%.

In 2007 the party returned to its original name, Liga Veneta Repubblica.

In the 2008 general election the LVR obtained 1.0% for the Chamber and 1.7% for the Senate. Later that year, the party signed a coalition pact with North-East Project (PNE) and Venetian Agreement (IV) for the next municipal, provincial and regional elections "in order to provide an adequate representation to the Venetian people, in line with what happens in Europe, from Scotland to Catalonia, from Wales to Brittany, where federalist, autonomist and independentist parties, who respond uniquely to their territory, see their popular support increasing." However, in the 2009 provincial and municipal elections the LVR chose to support the candidates of the Union of the Centre (UdC), having its best result in the province of Padua (1.6%).

For the 2010 regional election, after having formed Veneto Freedom (VL) with other Venetist parties, the party finally chose to support Antonio De Poli, regional leader of the UdC, for president under the banner of North-East Union (UNE), along with UNE, PNE and IV. This decision caused two splits: the more separatist wing, led by Polo, joined the new Party of the Venetians (PdV) and the left-wing minority faction, led by former leader Vido and Bortolino Sartore, formed a new party called Liga Veneto Autonomo (LVA) in order to participate in the centre-left coalition. In an election dominated by the LV, which rose to 35.2% of the vote, and LV's Luca Zaia for president, the UNE list won 1.5% of vote, with peaks of 1.9% and 1.8% in the provinces of Treviso and Belluno, and Foggiato (PNE) was re-elected to the Council. The LVA, which was able to present its list only in the province of Vicenza, one of LVR's strongholds, won 1.1% of the vote there, that is to say a big share of the vote (1.6%) the LVR gained in the previous regional election.

In the 2013 general election, the LVR obtained 0.7% of the vote regionally, 1.2% in its stronghold of the province of Vicenza.

=== Alliance with Liga Veneta ===
In July 2013, the LVR joined Let Veneto Decide, a loose cross-party committee for a referendum on Veneto's independence (see Venetian nationalism#Background and history), along with Stefano Valdegamberi (the regional councillor who presented bill 342/2013 on the referendum), Venetian Independence (IV, the party which had envisioned the campaign), Veneto State (VS), Raixe Venete, Veneto First, other Venetist groups and individuals. In March 2014, the party was a founding member of United for Independent Veneto, a more structured federation of Venetist and separatist parties, including also VS, Independent Venetians (VI) and Valdegamberi's Popular Future (FP). In July 2014 the coalition was transformed into "We Independent Veneto" (NVI), after the entry of other parties, notably including North-East Project and "Chiavegato for Independence". In the 2014 municipal election in San Bonifacio former mayor Polo, who had returned into the party's fold, was the joint candidate of the LVR and LV, but lost to the centre-left candidate in the run-off.

After the exit of Chiavegato and his group from the alliance and their alignment with Alessio Morosin's IV, the remaining parties of NVI formed a joint list for the 2015 regional election named Independence We Veneto (INV), a sort of re-edition of 2010's North-East Union, but with a separatist platform. The list supported inclumbent President Zaia of the LV, as opposed to IV and some minor groups, including UNE, supporting Flavio Tosi, leader of LV's breakaway Tosi List for Veneto. In the election, Zaia was easily re-elected and the INV list won 2.7% of the vote and Antonio Guadagnini of VS was elected regional councillor in the provincial constituency of Vicenza, while IV stopped at 2.5% with no seats.

In 2017 Comencini and other INV leaders were briefly members of Great North (GN), a liberal and federalist party. In 2018 the party elected Gianluigi Sette, while Comencini was appointed national president. In the 2019 local elections, the LVR stood with its own lists in San Bonifacio, Negrar di Valpolicella and Arzignano.

For the 2020 regional election the party directly entered in alliance with the LV, something that had not happened officially since the two parties divided in 1998. In the election, the LV sponsored three lists, its party list, Zaia's personal list and the "Venetian Autonomy List", whose logo was the LVR's one with minor modifications, especially "List" instead of "Liga" and the "Autonomy" banner in the lower part, along with LVR's acronym. The LVR obtained 2.4% of the vote and had Tomas Piccinini elected to the Regional Council.

In July 2025 Gianantonio Da Re, a former leader of the LV who had been ejected from Lega in 2024, while still being a member of the LN, joined the party. The party planned to run along with the LV in the upcoming 2025 regional election, otherwise it could stand alone with Da Re as candidate for president. However, while the LV agreed to continue the alliance, it posed a veto on Da Re, who was thus excluded from the LVR's slates, and finally ended up as an independent candidate for FI. It was also decided that the LVR's list would include some IV candidates, as Morosin and Luigi Boldo, as well as independent Venetists, as Daniele Stival and Gianluca Panto. In the election, the party won 1.8% of the vote and one seat for Morosin.

In the 2026 local elections the party ran in a few places, obtaining its best result in Arzignano, where it won 10.1% of the vote and its member Riccardo Masiero, who was supported by some centre-right parties but not the LV, was elected mayor by a landslide 68.5%, defeating the outgoing government led by LV.

== Electoral results ==
The electoral results of the party in Veneto are shown in the table below. For general elections, the returns for the Senate are given.

1999 European	2000 regional	2001 general	2004 European	2005 regional	2006 general	2008 general	2009 European	2010 regional	2013 general	2014 European
3.5	3.6 (Note: This result refers to the combined result of the LVR (2.4%) and Fronte Marco Polo (1.2%).)	4.9	0.6	1.2	0.6	1.7	–	1.5% (Note: In a joint list name North-East Union, along with North-East Project and Venetian Agreement.)	0.7	–

2015 regional	2018 general	2019 European	2020 regional	2022 general	2024 European	2025 regional
2.7 (Note: In a joint list named Independence We Veneto, along with Veneto State and Independent Venetians.)	–	–	2.4	–	–	1.8

=== Regional Council of Veneto ===
Election	Votes	%	Seats	+/–
2000	56,448	2.5	0 / 60	New
2005	27,524	1.2	0 / 60	0
2010	34,697 (Note: In a joint list name North-East Union, along with North-East Project and Venetian Agreement.)	1.6	1 / 60 (Note: Mariangelo Foggiato, member of North-East Project.)	▲1
2015	49,929 (Note: In a joint list named Independence We Veneto, along with Veneto State and Independent Venetians.)	2.7	1 / 51 (Note: Antonio Guadagnini, member of Veneto State.)	0
2020	48,932	2.4	1 / 51 (Note: Tomas Piccinini, independent.)	0
2025	30,703	1.8	1 / 51 (Note: Alessio Morosin, founding member and former president, currently affiliated with Venetian Independence.)	0

=== Italian Parliament ===
Election	Leader	Chamber of Deputies				Senate of the Republic			
Election	Leader	Votes	%	Seats	+/–	Votes	%	Seats	+/–
2001 (Note: Considering the Veneto 1 and Veneto 2 constituencies for the Chamber of Deputies and the Veneto constituency for the Senate of the Republic.)	Giorgio Vido	74,283	2.4	0 / 50	New	137,363	4.9	0 / 23	New
2006	Fabrizio Comencini	22,010	0.7	0 / 49	0	23,208	0.8	0 / 24	0
2008 (Note: The party was able to present its list only in the Veneto 1 constituency (Padua–Verona–Vicenza–Rovigo), where it gained 1.7% of the vote.)	Giorgio Vido	31,353	1.0	0 / 50	0	46,677	1.7	0 / 24	0
2013	Fabrizio Comencini	15,838	0.5	0 / 51	0	20,381	0.7	0 / 24	0

=== European Parliament ===
Election	Leader	Votes	%	Seats	+/–	EP Group
1999 (Note: Considering only the Veneto region.) (Note: In alliance with the Union for South Tyrol, Julian Front and others countrywide.)	Fabrizio Comencini	92,199	3.5	0 / 87	New	–
2004 (Note: In alliance with Lega per l'Autonomia – Alleanza Lombarda, the Sardinian Action Party and the Union for South Tyrol countrywide.)	Ettore Beggiato	17,650	0.7	0 / 78	0	–

== Leadership ==
- National secretary: Fabrizio Comencini (1998–2000), Ettore Beggiato (2000–2001), Giorgio Vido (2001–2003), Ettore Beggiato (2003–2004), Fabrizio Comencini (2004–2018), Gianluigi Sette (2018–present)
- National president: Mariangelo Foggiato (1998–1999), Donato Manfroi (1999–2000), Fabrizio Comencini (2000–2004), Alessio Morosin (2004–2007), Gian Pietro Piotto (2009–2018), Fabrizio Comencini (2018–present)

== Sources ==
- Francesco Jori, Dalla Łiga alla Lega. Storia, movimenti, protagonisti, Marsilio, Venice 2009
- Ezio Toffano, Short History of the Venetian Autonomism, Raixe Venete
