= Lombard Committee for Resolution 44 =

The Lombard Committee for Resolution 44 (Comitato Lombardo per la Risoluzione 44, CoLoR44) is a trans-party movement active in Lombardy, a region of Italy.

CoLoR44 proposes a referendum on the self-determination of Lombardy. The movement takes inspiration from a resolution, approved by the Regional Council of nearby Veneto in November 2012, which set the course toward a possible referendum on Venetian independence. The Committee is supported by several parties and associations, including Venetian Independence (the Venetian party which proposed Resolution 44) and Padanian Union.
