= 2010 Venetian regional election =

Italian regional election

- 28–29 March 2010

All 60 seats to the Regional Council
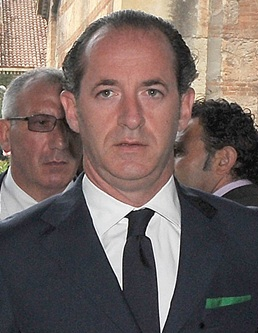

	Majority party	Minority party
Leader	Luca Zaia	Giuseppe Bortolussi
Party	Northern League	Independent
Alliance	Centre-right	Centre-left
Seats won	37	19
Seat change	▼2	0
Popular vote	1,528,386	738,761
Percentage	60.16%	29.08%
Swing	▲9.58%	▼13.27%
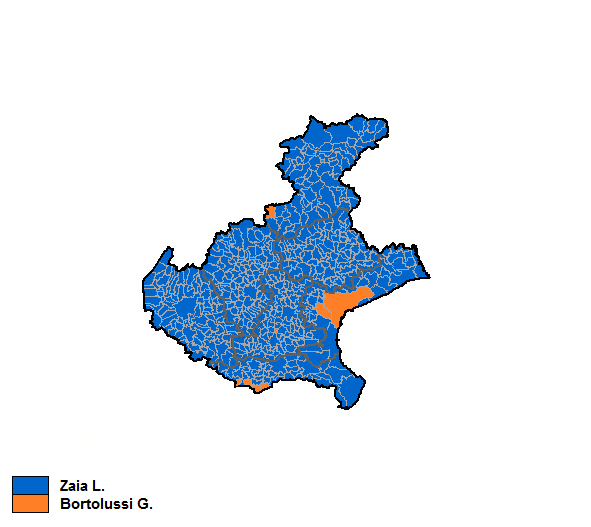
- Electoral results for area: blue for Zaia, orange for Bortolussi
President before election
Giancarlo Galan
Forza Italia
Subsequent President
Luca Zaia
Lega Nord

The Venetian regional election of 2010 took place on 28–29 March 2010, as part of Italy's big round of regional elections.

Luca Zaia, rising star of the Northern League, was elected President by a landslide. With the support of 60.2% of Venetians, he was the most voted President of Veneto since direct election was introduced in 1995. Liga Veneta became the largest in the region with 35.2%. The total score of Venetist parties (also including North-East Union, Party of the Venetians, Venetian National Party and Liga Veneto Autonomo) was 37.6%, the highest so far. The People of Freedom of the outgoing President Giancarlo Galan came second with 24.7% of the vote and the Democratic Party third with 20.3%.

Northern League managed the highest swing ever in a regional election in Veneto (+20.5%), gaining from almost every side of the political spectrum, but mainly from The People of Freedom (–7.5%), the Democrats (–8.6%) and North-East Union (–5.1%), whose main member parties were North-East Project (5.4% in 2005) and Liga Veneta Repubblica (1.2%).

== Electoral system ==
Regional elections in Veneto were ruled by the "Tatarella law" (approved in 1995), which provided for a mixed electoral system: four fifths of the regional councilors were elected in provincial constituencies by proportional representation, using the largest remainder method with a droop quota and open lists, while the residual votes and the unassigned seats were grouped into a "single regional constituency", where the whole ratios and the highest remainders were divided with the Hare method among the provincial party lists; one fifth of the council seats instead was reserved for regional lists and assigned with a majoritarian system: the leader of the regional list that scored the highest number of votes was elected to the presidency of the Region while the other candidates were elected regional councilors.

A threshold of 3% had been established for the provincial lists, which, however, could still have entered the regional council if the regional list to which they were connected had scored at least 5% of valid votes.

The panachage was also allowed: the voter can indicate a candidate for the presidency but prefer a provincial list connected to another candidate.

== Background ==
After having supported Giancarlo Galan (The People of Freedom, PdL) for ten years as President of Veneto, Liga Veneta–Lega Nord (that received 28.4% of the vote in the 2009 European Parliament election in Veneto compared to the 29.3% of the PdL), soon reclaimed the post of President for one of itself, with Luca Zaia (Minister of Agriculture in Berlusconi IV Cabinet) or Flavio Tosi (Mayor of Verona and most popular mayor of Italy) as likeliest choices.

Since the early days Zaia was the strongest candidate. According to an opinion poll, 72% of Venetian voters liked him and 67% considered him practised (48 and 42% were the scores of Galan, largely behind also of Tosi), a 49% would back him as President, while only 37% would back Galan. Moreover, centre-right voters preferred Zaia to Galan by an 8-point margin (49.3% to 41.2%). Differently from the incumbent president, Zaia was popular among the young and non-autonomous workers, who generally back the left. Galan and the regional section of the PdL (whose leader is Silvio Berlusconi) disagreed and wanted a fourth term for Galan, who was first elected in 1995. At some point a three-way race in Veneto between Galan, Zaia and a candidate of the Democratic Party (PD) seemed possible, but neither Berlusconi nor Umberto Bossi, federal secretary of Lega Nord, liked the idea.

In December 2009 the national committee of The People of Freedom (PdL) determined that it would have supported a Lega Nord member in Veneto. Subsequently the National Council (where "national" means "Venetian") of Liga Veneta nominated Zaia for President. Tosi, who as president of Liga Veneta presided the Council, tried until the last minute to be the candidate and some councillors opted for Franco Manzato instead. However, as a strong majority backed Zaia (including the party's secretary Gian Paolo Gobbo), Zaia was voted unanimously by the Council, including Tosi.

The Venetian PdL is afraid that Liga Veneta, headed by Zaia, will dominate regional politics for many years to come, similarly to what the South Tyrolean People's Party has done in South Tyrol. According to another opinion poll, in the forthcoming election, with Zaia candidate, the PdL would be reduced to a mere 23% with the League at 35% and Zaia would beat Galan also in a three-way race.

Galan, who has seldom hinted the idea of forming a Venetist party of his own, was rumored as independent candidate supported by the Union of Christian and Centre Democrats (UDC) and, less likely, by the opposition Democratic Party. However Galan ruled out the idea of running against his party and Zaia, opening the way for a bid by Antonio De Poli, UDC regional leader.

The UDC refused to join forces with the centre-left, leaving the PD to choose between Laura Puppato, Mayor of Montebelluna, who had expressed her interest for the race and Giuseppe Bortolussi, respected leader of the Mestre section of Confartigianato. The PD eventually chose Bortolussi, who beat Puppato by 39 votes to 29 in the regional board of the party.

== Parties and candidates ==
Political party or alliance	Constituent lists	Previous result		Candidate
Political party or alliance	Constituent lists	Votes (%)	Seats	Candidate
Centre-right coalition	The People of Freedom (PdL)	33.2	17	Luca Zaia
Centre-right coalition	Northern League – Venetian League (LN–LV)	14.7	7	Luca Zaia
Centre-right coalition	Alliance of the Centre – Christian Democracy (AdC–DC)	—N/a	—N/a	Luca Zaia
Centre-left coalition	Democratic Party (PD)	24.3	13	Giuseppe Bortolussi
Centre-left coalition	Federation of the Left (FdS)	5.0	2	Giuseppe Bortolussi
Centre-left coalition	Italy of Values (IdV)	1.3	–	Giuseppe Bortolussi
Centre-left coalition	Left Ecology Freedom – Italian Socialist Party (SEL–PSI)	—N/a	—N/a	Giuseppe Bortolussi
Centre-left coalition	IDEA – List for Veneto (incl. Greens)	—N/a	—N/a	Giuseppe Bortolussi
Centre-left coalition	Liga Veneto Autonomo (LVA)	—N/a	—N/a	Giuseppe Bortolussi
Centrist coalition	Union of the Centre (UDC)	6.4	3	Antonio De Poli
Centrist coalition	North-East Union (inc. PNE, LVR and IV)	5.5	2	Antonio De Poli
Five Star Movement (M5S)		—N/a	—N/a	David Borrelli
Venetians Independence		—N/a	—N/a	Silvano Polo
New Force (FN)		—N/a	—N/a	Paolo Caratossidis
Venetian National Party (PNV)		—N/a	—N/a	Gianluca Panto

== Results ==
28–29 March 2010 Venetian regional election results
Candidates	Votes	%	Seats	Parties	Votes	%	Seat
Luca Zaia	1,528,386	60.16	6				
Luca Zaia	1,528,386	60.16	6	Northern League – Venetian League	788,581	35.16	18
Luca Zaia	1,528,386	60.16	6	The People of Freedom	555,006	24.74	13
Luca Zaia	1,528,386	60.16	6	Alliance of the Centre – Christian Democracy	18,114	0.81	–
Luca Zaia	1,528,386	60.16	6	Total	1,361,702	60.71	31
Giuseppe Bortolussi	738,761	29.08	1				
Giuseppe Bortolussi	738,761	29.08	1	Democratic Party	456,309	20.34	14
Giuseppe Bortolussi	738,761	29.08	1	Italy of Values	119,396	5.32	3
Giuseppe Bortolussi	738,761	29.08	1	Federation of the Left	35,028	1.56	1
Giuseppe Bortolussi	738,761	29.08	1	Left Ecology Freedom – Italian Socialist Party	27,578	1.23	–
Giuseppe Bortolussi	738,761	29.08	1	IDEA – List for Veneto	15,907	0.67	–
Giuseppe Bortolussi	738,761	29.08	1	Liga Veneto Autonomo	4,390	0.20	–
Giuseppe Bortolussi	738,761	29.08	1	Total	657,798	29.33	18
Antonio De Poli	162,235	6.39	–				
Antonio De Poli	162,235	6.39	–	Union of the Centre	110,417	4.92	3
Antonio De Poli	162,235	6.39	–	North-East Union	34,697	1.55	1
Antonio De Poli	162,235	6.39	–	Total	145,114	6.47	4
David Borrelli	80,246	3.16	–	Five Star Movement	57,848	2.58	–
Silvano Polo	12,891	0.51	–	Venetians Independence	7,879	0.35	–
Paolo Caratossidis	9,151	0.35	–	New Force	6,476	0.29	–
Gianluca Panto	9,006	0.36	–	Venetian National Party	6,226	0.28	–
Total candidates	2,540,736	100.00	7	Total parties	2,243,042	100.00	53
Source: Ministry of the Interior

=== Council composition ===
Distribution of Seats in the Regional Council
Political Group	Leader	2010	2015
Venetian Democratic Party	Laura Puppato / Lucio Tiozzo	14	10
Liga Veneta–Lega Nord	Federico Caner	20	7
NCD–UdC	Giancarlo Conta	–	7
The People of Freedom–Forza Italia	Dario Bond	17	5
Forza Italia	Leonardo Padrin	–	5
Tosi List for Veneto (Venetian Commitment)	Francesco Piccolo	–	3
Popular Future	Stefano Valdegamberi	–	3
Veneto First	Giovanni Furlanetto	–	3
Family–Pensioners (Toward North–Venetian People)	Diego Bottacin	–	3
Civic Veneto	Giuseppe Berlato Sella	–	3
Zaia President	Gianpiero Possamai	–	3
Italy of Values	Gustavo Franchetto / Antonino Pipitone	3	2
Union of the Centre	Stefano Valdegamberi / Stefano Peraro	3	1
Federation of the Left	Pietrangelo Pettenò	1	1
North-East Union	Mariangelo Foggiato / Rolando Bortoluzzi	1	1
Bortolussi President	Giuseppe Bortolussi	1	1
Mixed Group	–	–	2

Sources: Regional Council of Veneto – Groups and Regional Council of Veneto – Members

== Aftermath ==
After the election, Luca Zaia formed his first government, composed of twelve ministers, six of Liga Veneta, that maintained the strategic Health portfolio (with Luca Coletto) and gained, above all, Budget and Finances (with Roberto Ciambetti), and six of the PdL, including Marino Zorzato, who was sworn as Vice President, and Renato Chisso, who was confirmed for a third consecutive term as Minister of Infrastructures and Transports.

First Zaia Government
Office	Name	Party
President	Luca Zaia	LV
Vice President	Marino Zorzato	PdL/NCD
Minister of Budget and Local Government	Roberto Ciambetti	LV
Minister of Health	Luca Coletto	LV
Minister of Economic Development (also minister of Infrastructures since October 2014)	Maria Luisa Coppola	PdL/FI (Note: In November 2013 The People of Freedom (PdL) was transformed into Forza Italia (FI); a group of dissidents formed the New Centre-Right (NCD).)
Minister of Infrastructures and Transports	Renato Chisso (until June 2014)	PdL/FI
Minister of Public Works, Energy and Security	Massimo Giorgetti	PdL/FI
Minister of Agriculture	Franco Manzato	LV
Minister of Education and Labour (also minister of Transports since October 2014)	Elena Donazzan	PdL/FI
Minister of Social Affairs	Remo Sernagiotto (until June 2014); Davide Bendinelli (since October 2014)	PdL/FI; FI
Minister of Tourism and International Trade	Marino Finozzi	LV
Minister of Environment	Maurizio Conte	LV/LTV
Minister of Venetian Identity and Civil Protection	Daniele Stival	LV/LTV (Note: In March 2015 a group of splinters from Liga Veneta (LV) formed the Tosi List for Veneto (LTV).)
Minister of Culture and City Planning	Marino Zorzato	PdL/NCD

Source: Region of Veneto — The Regional Government from 1970 until today
