= Independentist Youth =

Independentist Youth (Xoventù Independentista, XI) is a Venetist separatist youth organization active in Veneto. Its main leader is Giacomo Mirto.

The group was formed in 2008 under the leadership of Mirto. XI is independent from parties, although some of its members, including Mirto, are involved in Veneto State (VS), and its main goal is to educate young Venetians on the road toward full independence. The group is particularly concerned with the reform of the school system and the environment. XI is "conservative in values" and professes an anti-globalist and communitarian credo, as opposed to libertarianism, which characterized the early leadership of VS and is now a feature of the other notable Venetist-separatist party, Venetian Independence (IV).

On 6 January 2012 Mirto, who had become municipal coordinator of VS in Verona, was replaced as spokesperson by Stefano Danieli.

On 12 May 2012 XI organized a demonstration in Venice under the slogan "We're all Serenissimi", a reference to the "patriots" of the Venetian Most Serene Government, who assaulted the St Mark's Campanile in 1997. Thirty protesters were charged by the police for having brought Venetian flags in Piazza San Marco.

== Leadership ==
- Spokesman: Giacomo Mirto (2008–2012), Stefano Danieli (2012–present)
