= North-East Project =

North-East Project Progetto NordEst
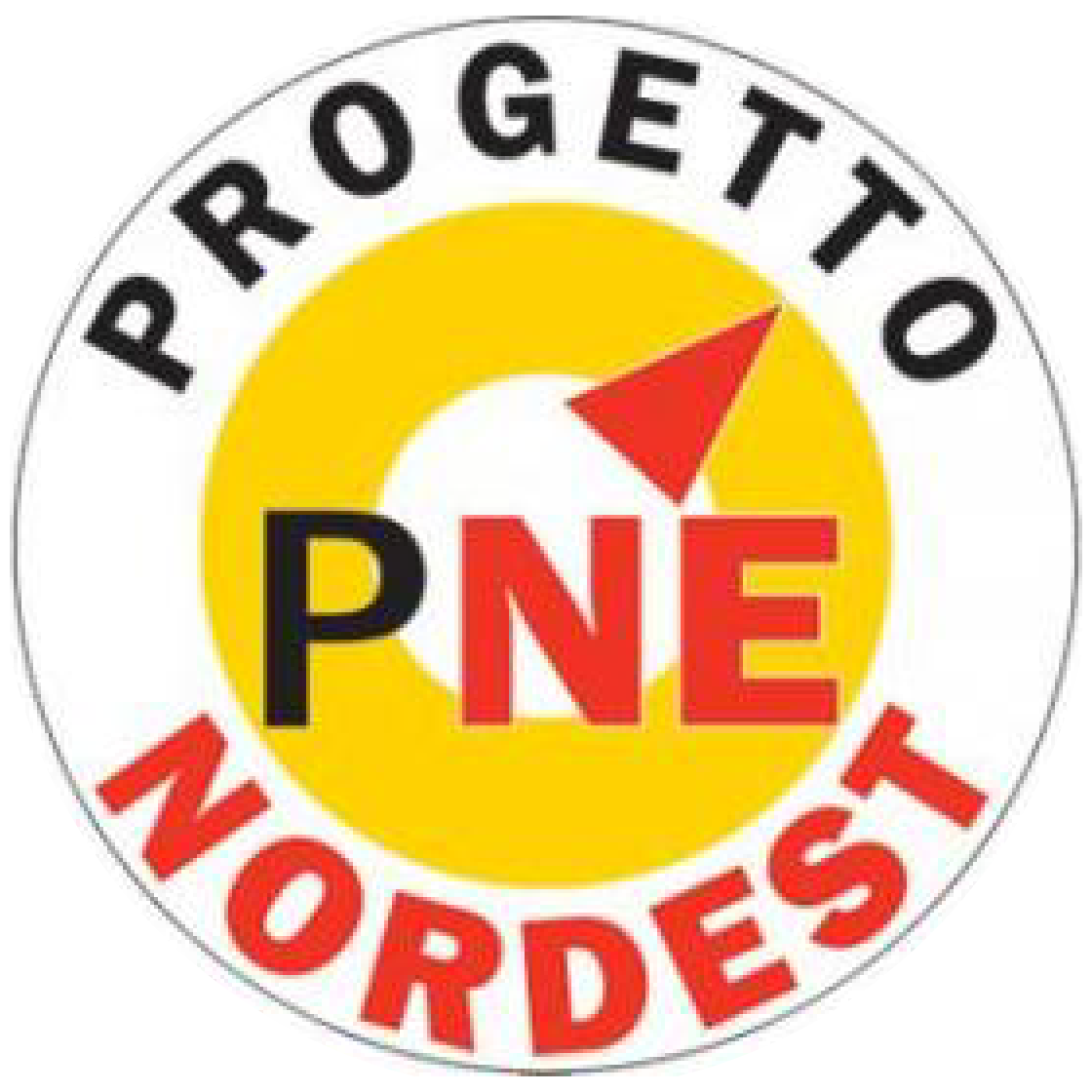
- President: Giorgio Panto (2004–2006)
- Secretary: Mariangelo Foggiato (2004–2015 ca.)
- Founded: June 2004
- Dissolved: 2015 ca.
- Split from: Liga Veneta
- Ideology: Venetian nationalism Regionalism; Autonomism; Federalism; Libertarianism
- Political position: Centre

Website
- http://www.progettonordest.org

North-East Project (Italian: Progetto NordEst, PNE) was a Venetist, fiscal federalist and libertarian Italian political party based in Veneto, demanding larger autonomy, if not complete independence for the region.

== History ==
The party was founded in June 2004 by Giorgio Panto, along with former members of the Liga Veneta–Lega Nord (LV–LN) and former members of Liga Fronte Veneto, notably Mariangelo Foggiato and Ettore Beggiato. Panto himself had been a long-time supporter of Lega Nord, but he distanced from it as he perceived it to be too moderate and Lombardy-centred.

The PNE won 5.4% of the vote in the 2005 regional election, electing Foggiato and Diego Cancian to the Regional Council of Veneto, while Panto, who was candidate for President and ran a campaign based on the slogan "Dignity. Autonomy for Veneto", took 6.0% (16.1% in the stronghold of Treviso). The key-issue for the party within the Regional Council has since been transforming Veneto into an autonomous region as Trentino-Alto Adige/Südtirol and Friuli-Venezia Giulia.

In the 2006 general election the party won 2.7% of the vote in Veneto and the 0.7% in Friuli-Venezia Giulia for the Chamber of Deputies, while the list for the Senate, headed by Panto, did not go further 3.5%, failing to elect him senator (he would have needed to surpass the 8.0% threshold for parties non affiliated to a national coalition). In the Treviso provincial election Panto and the PNE won respectively 10.3 and 10.8% of the vote, respectively.

In November 2006 Panto died in a helicopter accident, laying the future of the party, which was heavily dependent on his leadership, personality and cash, on the line. In 2008 the PNE was on the verge of forming an alliance with LV–LN and The People of Freedom (PdL). However, after that talks with the leaders of the centre-right failed, the PNE decided not to present a list for the 2008 general election, thus helping Lega Nord to win 27.1% of the vote in the region.

In October 2008 the PNE signed a coalition pact with Liga Veneta Repubblica (LVR; which soon left the alliance) and Venetian Agreement (IV) for the future municipal, provincial and regional elections "in order to provide an adequate representation to the Venetian people, in line with what happens in Europe, from Scotland to Catalonia, from Wales to Brittany, where federalist, autonomist and independentist parties, who resopond uniquely to their territory, see their popular support increasing."

In November 2008 Cancian left the party in disagreement with Foggiato and launched the Forum of Venetians. In the 2009 provincial elections the PNE had its best result in Belluno (1.6%), where it supported the candidate of LV–LN.

For the 2010 regional election the party finally chose to support Antonio De Poli (UDC) for President under the banner of North-East Union (UNE), along with UNE, LVR and IV. The list won 1.5% of vote, with peaks of 1.9% and 1.8% in the provinces of Treviso and Belluno, and Mariangelo Foggiato (PNE) was re-elected to the Council.

In the 2011 provincial election of Treviso the UNE won 2.4% of the vote and the PNE lost all its provincial councillors.

In July 2014 the party joined "We Independent Veneto" (NVI), a coalition of Venetist and separatist parties including LVR, Veneto State (VS), Independent Venetians (VI) and other minor groups. In April 2015 NVI formed a joint list for the 2015 regional election named Independence We Veneto (INV), a sort of re-edition of 2010's UNE, but with a separatist platform and in support of Luca Zaia, incumbent President of Veneto and candidate of LV–LN. In the election, the list won 2.7% of the vote (0.2% more than IV) and Antonio Guadagnini of VS was elected regional councillor.

== Ideology ==
North-East Project, which was active also in Friuli-Venezia Giulia, proposed the creation of a "macro-region" (macro-regione) through the merger of Veneto, Friuli-Venezia Giulia and Trentino-Alto Adige/Südtirol. This peculiarity among Venetist parties explains the party's name. The party was also more economically liberal and libertarian than its main competitors, Liga Veneta and The People of Freedom, and tended to put fiscal federalism first. On other issues, it tended to be very similar to the other Venetist parties.

== Leadership ==
- President: Giorgio Panto (2004–2006)
- Secretary: Mariangelo Foggiato (2004–2015 ca.)
