= Fabrizio Comencini =

Italian politician

Fabrizio Comencini (born 6 November 1953, in Garda) is an Italian politician.

Comencini started his political career in the Italian Social Movement (MSI), for which he was elected to the Regional Council of Veneto in 1985 and 1990. In the early 1990s, during his second term in the Council, he switched to Liga Veneta–Lega Nord. In 1994 he was elected secretary of the party and in 1995 he was re-elected to the Council. During his tenure as leader, Lega Nord had its best electoral result so far in Veneto and in any other region, scoring 29.7% of the vote at the 1996 general election.

In 1998 Comencini broke with Umberto Bossi in the name of Venetian nationalism as opposed to Padanian nationalism. Although he commanded a majority of Liga Veneta's regional councillors (7 out of 9: Ettore Beggiato, Alessio Morosin, Mariangelo Foggiato, Alberto Poirè, Michele Munaretto, Franco Roccon and himself), Comencini was not supported by the majority of Liga Veneta who supported Gian Paolo Gobbo instead. He thus resigned as national secretary and formed a new party called Liga Veneta Repubblica (later Veneti d'Europa, Liga Fronte Veneto and finally, again, Liga Veneta Repubblica).

Most recently, Comencini ran in the 2015 regional election for Independence We Veneto (in support of Luca Zaia's second term as President), but was not elected.
