= Ettore Beggiato =

Italian and politician (born 1954)

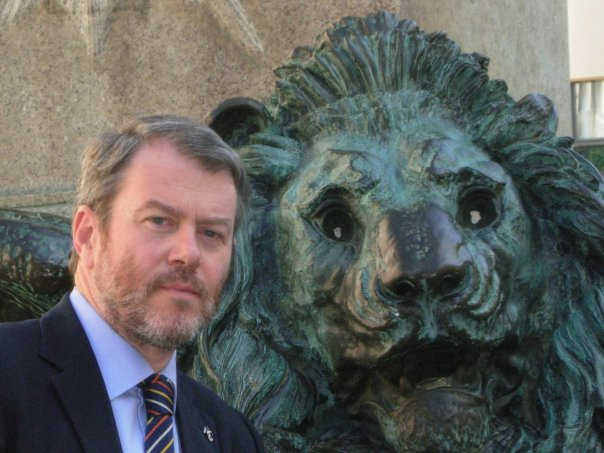
- Ettore Beggiato at Campo Manin, Venice. This square is dedicated to the memory of Daniele Manin, a Venetian patriot, who led Venetian resistance against Austrian Empire occupation in the mid-19th century
- Born: August 4, 1954 (age 72); Campiglia dei Berici
- Occupations: Historian, politician

Ettore Beggiato (born 4 August 1954) is an Italian historian and politician.

As member of several Venetist political parties (Liga Veneta 1980–1987, Union of the Venetian People 1987–1995, Liga Veneta–Lega Nord 1995–1998, Liga Veneta Repubblica/Veneti d'Europa/Liga Fronte Veneto 1998–2004), he was member of the Regional Council of Veneto from 1985 to 2000. He was secretary of Liga Fronte Veneto from 2002 to 2004, when he joined the North-East Project, party of which he is currently member.

Beggiato is the author of many books about the history and the culture of Veneto such as 1866: The great swindle, about the referendum with which Veneto was united with Italy. He allegedly demonstrated it was not regular and not fairly democratic at all. For these reasons, Beggiato claims that Veneto is an independent nation and that it is necessary to re-celebrate it.
