= Veneto First =

Veneto First was a Venetist and separatist political party active in Veneto

Veneto First (Prima il Veneto, PiV) was a Venetist and separatist political party active in Veneto.

The party was formed in August 2013 as a faction within Liga Veneta–Lega Nord (LV–LN) by some Venetists and old-guard Bossiani who opposed Flavio Tosi's leadership of the party and disagreed with his support for a united Italy. Those notably included two former deputies (Corrado Callegari and Paola Goisis), two regional councillors (Giovanni Furlanetto and Santino Bozza), a provincial minister of Venice and the former LV–LN provincial secretary of Venice (Paolo Pizzolato). All five but Callegari had been ejected from the party by Tosi in April, even though Furlanetto had been later reintegrated. The President of Veneto, Luca Zaia, usually close to Venetists, took distance from the initiative and criticized the use of "Veneto First", which had been his campaign slogan during the 2010 regional election.

In January 2014 it was announced that Veneto First had become a separate party, which would form alliances with other separatist parties. Furlanetto, who had been a member of Liga Veneta (LV) since 1987, left the party's group in the Regional Council and re-joined Bozza in the Mixed Group.

In February 2015 Vittorino Cenci left the group of the LV in the Council, citing disagreements with Tosi, the new federal leader Matteo Salvini and the latter's lurch to the right, and, while remaining loyal to the party and Zaia, decided to join Veneto First, which became a full-fledged group in the Council.

In April Bozza announced that he would stand for re-election in the 2015 regional election as a candidate of "Autonomous Veneto Project", a Venetist list in support of Alessandra Moretti of the Democratic Party. Otherwise, in May Furlanetto endorsed Alessio Morosin of Venetian Independence.

In January 2016 Del Zotto was elected secretary, replacing Callegari. In September the party, along with Morosin, opened its new headquarters in Mestre.

In the 2017 local elections PiV's Pizzolato ran for mayor of Mira and obtained 2.8% of the vote.

== Leadership ==
- Secretary: Corrado Callegari (2013–2016), Pierangelo Del Zotto (2016–present)
- Leader in the Regional Council: Giovanni Furlanetto (2014–2015), Vittorino Cenci (2015)
