= Vedelago =

- Comune
- Comune di Vedelago
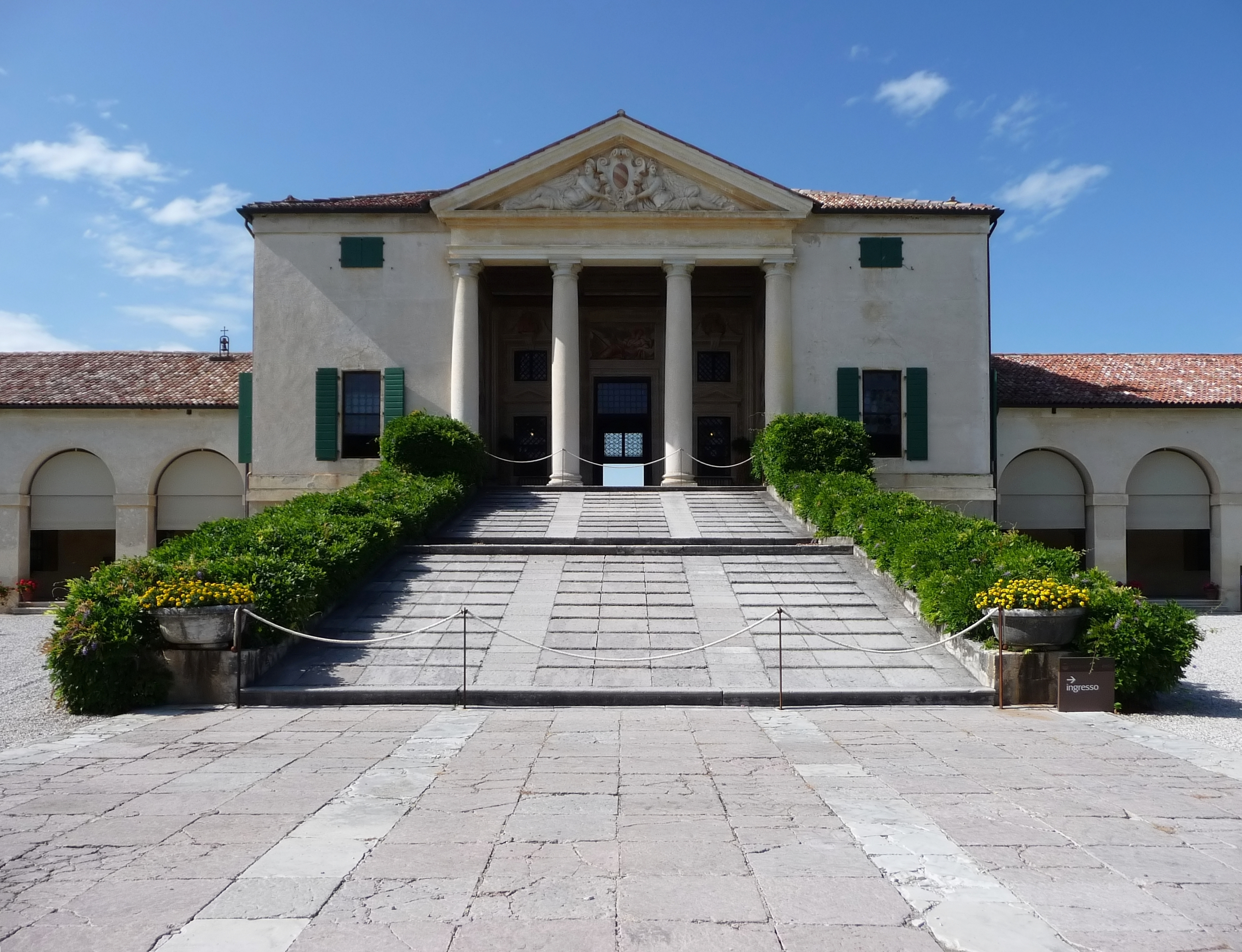

- Location within Italy Location within Veneto
- Coordinates: 45°41′N 12°1′E
- Country: Italy
- Region: Veneto
- Province: Treviso (TV)
- Frazioni: Albaredo, Barcon, Carpenedo, Casacorba, Cavasagra, Fanzolo, Fossalunga

Government
  - Mayor: Giuseppe Romano

Area
  - Total: 61.7 km^{2} (23.8 sq mi)
- Elevation: 43 m (141 ft)

Population (30 June 2023)
  - Total: 16,474
  - Density: 267/km^{2} (692/sq mi)
- Demonym: Vedelaghesi
- Time zone: UTC+1 (CET)
  - Summer (DST): UTC+2 (CEST)
- Postal code: 31050
- Dialing code: 0423
- Patron saint: St. Martin
- Saint day: November 11
- Website: Official website

Vedelago (Venetian: Vedeàgo) is a comune (municipality) of estimated population of 16,474 in the Province of Treviso in the Italian region Veneto, located about 35 kilometres (22 mi) northwest of Venice, about 45 kilometres (28 mi) east of Vicenza, about 44 kilometres (27 mi) north of Padua and about 20 kilometres (12 mi) west of Treviso.

The main attraction is the Villa Emo, by Andrea Palladio, in the frazione Fanzolo.

== History ==
=== Prehistory ===
The area, very rich in springs, has favored human presence since ancient times. In the Fossa Storta di Cavasagra area, near the sources of the Sile, a significant quantity of remains of tools, weapons and millstones dating back to the Neolithic were found. Right near the sources of the river, other finds testify to the presence of a large pile-dwelling settlement (seven-eight thousand inhabitants) dating back to the Eneolithic; These include, among other things, bones of domestic animals, food scraps, tools and urns belonging to a necropolis.

With the arrival of the Romans, Vedelago was assigned to the territory of Asolo and was involved in the centuriation works which radically reorganized the rural environment. The orientation of the cardos and decumani was based on the route of the Via Postumia, built in 148 BC. Traces of centuriation are still evident in the current layout of roads, fields and ditches, particularly in the hamlets of Fanzolo and Barcon.

As regards archaeological finds, remains of houses and burials have been brought to light along the Postumia River.

== Monuments and places of interest ==
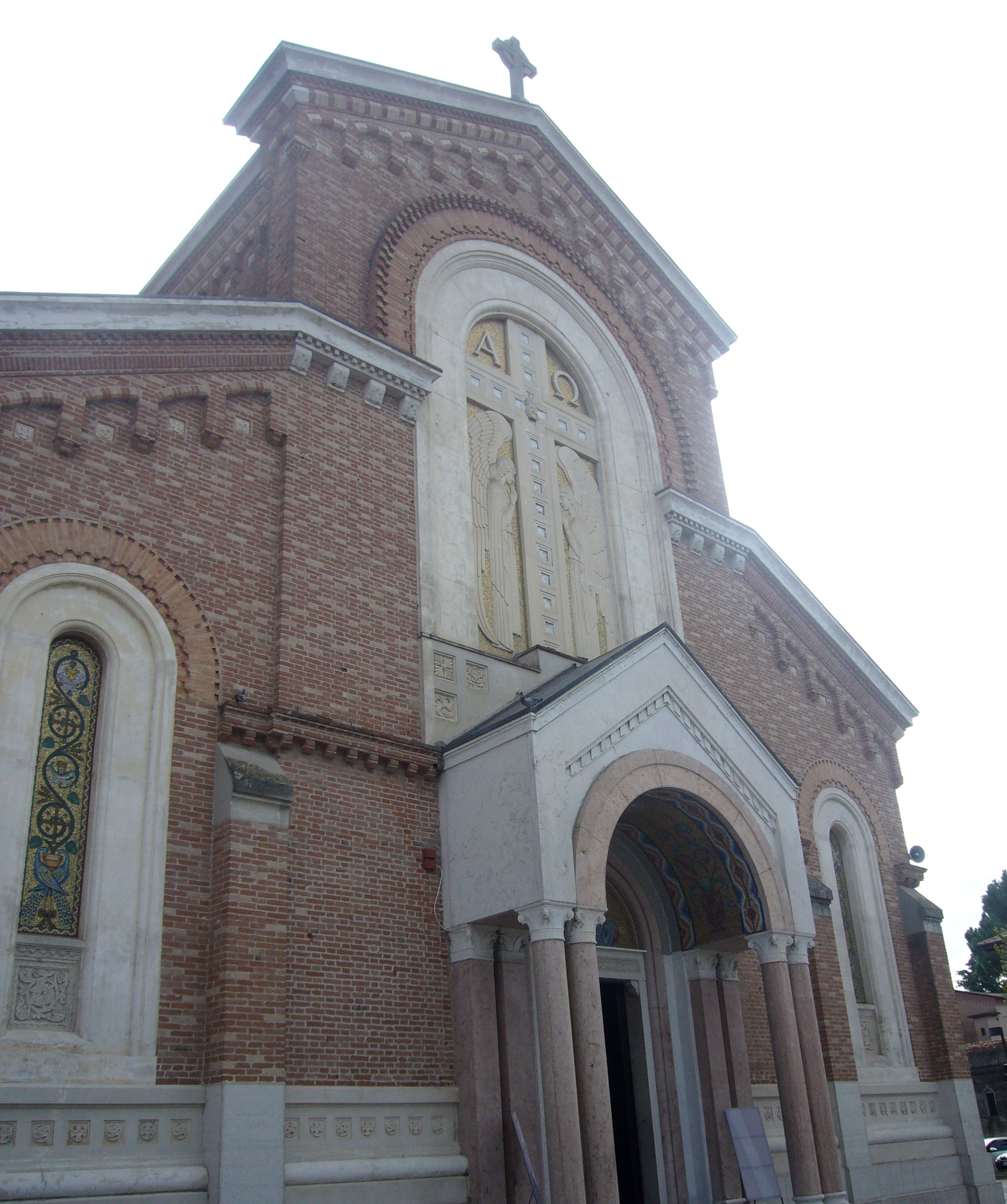
The parish church of San Martino Vescovo

=== The church ===
The new church of Vedelago was built between 1926 and 1927, after the demolition of a previous place of worship.

About 55 m long and with a height of about 20 m, on the outside it has walls made of light red stones, while on the inside the most distinctive aspect is represented by 12 columns, connected to each other by some arches.

Unlike many churches in the area, that of Vedelago has an original and fascinating Romanesque-Gothic style, appearing rather dark.

== Society ==
=== Demographic evolution ===
Historical population

Year	Pop.	±%
1861	?	—
1871	6,129	—
1881	6,834	+11.5%
1901	7,971	+16.6%
1911	9,656	+21.1%
1921	11,038	+14.3%

Year	Pop.	±%
1931	10,829	−1.9%
1936	10,969	+1.3%
1951	11,407	+4.0%
1961	10,189	−10.7%
1971	10,663	+4.7%
1981	12,084	+13.3%

Year	Pop.	±%
1991	13,011	+7.7%
2001	13,826	+6.3%
2011	16,434	+18.9%
2021	16,554	+0.7%

Source: Data from ISTAT

Based on the number of inhabitants, Vedelago ranks 11th among the 95 municipalities in the province of Treviso. However, its surface area (one of the largest) gives it a rather low population density, at least compared to the other more populous municipalities.

=== Foreign ethnic groups and minorities ===
As of 31 December 2022, foreigners resident in the municipality were 1,528, or 9.3% of the population. Below are the most significant groups:

1. Romania 518
2. China 167
3. Morocco 99
4. Kosovo 95
5. Albania 72
6. North Macedonia 69
7. Senegal 59
8. Bangladesh 52
9. India 52
10. Burkina Faso 45

== Economy ==
The local economy has not abandoned agriculture: cereals, wheat, vegetables, fodder, vines and orchards are grown. Breeding is also practiced, especially of cattle, pigs and poultry. The industrial fabric is made up of companies in the food sector (including those for the processing and preservation of fruit and vegetables and feed mills), mechanical companies (including those producing machinery for agriculture and forestry).
