= Antonio De Poli =

Italian politician

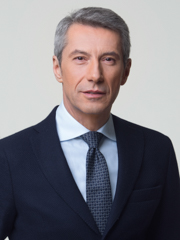

Antonio De Poli (born 4 October 1960 in Vicenza) is an Italian politician and former Member of the European Parliament for North-East with the Union of Christian and Centre Democrats, part of the European People's Party. In the EP he was vice-chair of the European Parliament's Committee on Fisheries and its Committee on Employment and Social Affairs.

He is also a member of the Delegation for relations with Canada and a substitute for the Delegation for relations with the United States.

== Biography ==
Antonio De Poli was born on 4 October 1960 in Vicenza and he took a high school certificate in technical subjects. He worked as employee at the State Railways, then he served as Mayor of Carmignano di Brenta from 1990 to 1995, as regional councillor of Veneto from 1995 to 2000 and as regional assessor for Social Policies from 2000 to 2004. He was elected MEP in the 2004 European Parliament election with the Union of Christian and Centre Democrats. After the 2005 Venetian regional election he resigned as MEP to become again regional assessor for Social Policies. In the 2006 Italian general election he was elected to the Senate for the Republic, while in the 2008 Italian general election he was elected to the Chamber of Deputies. In the 2013 Italian general election he was again elected Senator into the centrist list With Monti for Italy.

On 20 December 2016 Antonio De Poli has been appointed President of the Union of the Centre.
