= Stefano Valdegamberi =

Italian politician

Stefano Valdegamberi (born 6 May 1960 in Tregnago) is a Venetist politician from Veneto, Italy, and former mayor of Badia Calavena.

== Political career ==
A member of Christian Democracy (DC) since the late 1980s, Valdegamberi joined the Christian Democratic Centre (CCD) in 1994, after DC's disbanding. He was twice elected mayor of Badia Calavena. He was first elected to the Regional Council of Veneto in 2005 for the Union of Christian and Centre Democrats (UDC) and was regional minister of Local and Social Affairs in Giancarlo Galan's third government (2005–2010). Re-elected in 2010, he was appointed floor leader of the re-branded Union of the Centre (UdC).

In April 2013 Valdegamberi introduced a bill in order to call a referendum on Veneto's independence by the end of the year. A month later, he left the UdC over disagreements with the party's leadership and formed a Christian-democratic regional party, "Popular Future", along with other two regional councillors (Raffaele Grazia from the UdC and Gustavo Franchetto from Italy of Values). The new party was joined also by Giampaolo Fogliardi, who had been a deputy of the Democratic Party until February 2013. In June 2014 the Regional Council passed Valdegamberi's bill, but the referendum was later ruled out by the Constitutional Court as contrary to the Constitution.

In the 2015 regional election Valdegamberi stood as a candidate in Luca Zaia's personal list and was re-elected handily in the provincial constituency of Verona. In the 2020 regional election Valdegamberi, then a full-fledged member of Zaia's Liga Veneta party, was re-elected from Zaia's personal list from the province of Verona.

Valdegamberi is a traditional conservative and has been a founding member of the pro-life caucus within the Regional Council in July 2023. He routinely presents pro-Russian views and according to an investigative article he may have received funding from Russia's International Agency for Current Policy.

As of November 2023, Valdegamberi is no longer a member of Liga Veneta.

In April 2026, he joins National Future led by Roberto Vannacci.

== Publications ==
- Le origini del linguaggio di
- De decimis novalibus.La colonizzazione teutonica dell'Alta Longazeria e la questione delle decime sui novali nell'abbazia di Calavena
- Alle origini degli antichi comuni di Saline, Tavernole e Corno
