= Timeline of Padua =

The following is a timeline of the history of the city of Padua in the Veneto region of Italy.

== Prior to 15th century ==
- 89 BCE – Romans in power.
- 45 BCE – Patavium designated a municipium.
- 350 CE – Roman Catholic Diocese of Padua established (approximate date).
- 452 CE – Padua besieged by Hun forces of Attila.
- 540 – Padua becomes part of the Byzantine Empire.
- 601 – Padua besieged by forces of Lombard Agilulf.
- 11th century – Constitution created.
- 1147 - A fire destroys most of Padua, resulting in the virtual rebuilding of the entire city.
- 1219 – Palazzo della Ragione built.
- 1222 – University of Padua founded.
- 1230 – Basilica of Saint Anthony of Padua construction begins.
- 1237 – Ezzelino III da Romano in power.
- 1256 – Ezzelino III ousted.
- 1266 – Padua takes nearby Vicenza.
- 1284 – Tomb of Antenor rebuilt in the Piazza Antenore.
- 1304 – Salt War with Venice
- 1305 – Artist Giotto paints the Scrovegni Chapel (approximate date).
- 1311 – Cangrande I della Scala in power.
- 1318 – Jacopo I da Carrara becomes lord of Padua.
- 1320 – Padua is ruled by a series of German vicars for Frederick the Fair, Duke of Austria.
- 1328 – Padua becomes part of the Scaliger domains.
- 1337 – Paduan independence restored, under Venetian protection, during the Scaliger War.
- 1360 – Public clock installed (approximate date).
- 1386 – Battle of Brentelle fought near Padua.

== 15th–19th centuries ==
- 1404 – War of Padua begins.
- 1405 – Venetians in power.
- 1431 – Squarcione's school of art active.
- 1453 – Equestrian statue of Gattamelata erected in the Piazza del Santo.
- 1472 – Printing press in operation.
- 1509 – September: Siege of Padua during the War of the League of Cambrai; Venetian forces defeat those of the Holy Roman Empire.
- 1526 – Loggia del Consiglio (Padua) built on the Piazza dei Signori.
- 1540 – Accademia degli Infiammati (learned society) formed.
- 1545 – Orto botanico di Padova (garden) founded.
- 1548 – Italian Synagogue founded.^{(it)}
- 1594 – Anatomical Theatre of Padua built in the university's Bo Palace.
- 1617 – Spanish synagogue established.
- 1629 – Biblioteca universitaria di Padova (library) founded.
- 1631 – Plague.
- 1678 – Elena Cornaro Piscopia earns PhD degree from the university.
- 1767 – Prato della Valle (square) property transferred to city.
- 1779 – Accademia di scienze lettere e arti (learned society) active.
- 1780 – Museo civico di Padova (city museum) founded.
- 1797 – Republic of Venice ends.
- 1831 – Pedrocchi Café in business.
- 1842 – Padova railway station opens.
- 1846 – Achille De Zigno becomes mayor.
- 1857 – Biblioteca Civica di Padova (library) established.
- 1866 – Padua becomes part of the Kingdom of Italy.
- 1883 – Padua tram system (1883–1954) begins operating.
- 1897 – Population: 82,210.

== 20th century ==
- 1911 – Population: 96,230.
- 1937 – Trolleybus system begins operating.
- 1941 – Cinema Theatro Concordi built.
- 1944 – Aerial bombardment of Padua during World War II.
- 1947 – Cesare Crescente becomes mayor (until 1970).
- 1948 – Archivio di Stato di Padova (state archives) established.
- 1953 – Tempio nazionale dell'internato ignoto (war memorial) dedicated.
- 1961 – Marsilio Editori (publisher) in business.
- 1974 – Banca d'Italia building constructed.
- 1977 – Radio Sherwood begins broadcasting.
- 1978 – Il Mattino di Padova newspaper begins publication.
- 1980 – Palasport San Lazzaro (arena) opens.
- 1981 – Stadio Plebiscito (stadium) opens.
- 1982 – 28 January: Rescue of kidnapped U.S. military officer Dozier.
- 1993 – Flavio Zanonato becomes mayor.
- 1996 – Banca Antoniana Popolare Veneta established.

== 21st century ==
- 2002 – Regional Corriere del Veneto newspaper begins publication.
- 2006
  - Controversial Via Anelli Wall built.
  - Il Padova newspaper begins publication.^{(it)}
- 2007 – Rubber-tyred "tramway" (Translohr technology) begins operating.
- 2011 – Population: 214,125.
- 2014 – Municipal election held; Massimo Bitonci becomes mayor.^{(it)}
- 2015 – 31 May: Venetian regional election, 2015 held.

== See also ==
- History of Padua
- List of mayors of Padua
- History of Veneto region (it)
- Timeline of the Republic of Venice, of which Padua was part 1405–1797

Timelines of other cities in the macroregion of Northeast Italy:^{(it)}

- Emilia-Romagna region: Timeline of Bologna; Ferrara; Forlì; Modena; Parma; Piacenza; Ravenna; Reggio Emilia; Rimini
- Friuli-Venezia Giulia region: Timeline of Trieste
- Trentino-South Tyrol region: Timeline of Bolzano; Trento
- Veneto region: Timeline of Treviso; Venice; Verona; Vicenza

== Bibliography ==
=== in English ===
- Abraham Rees (1819), "Padua", The Cyclopaedia, London: Longman, Hurst, Rees, Orme & Brown
- William Smith, ed. (1872) [1854]. "Patavium". Dictionary of Greek and Roman Geography. London: John Murray. hdl:2027/hvd.ah5cur.
- "Padua", Hand-book for Travellers in Northern Italy (16th ed.), London: John Murray, 1897, OCLC 2231483
- T. Francis Bumpus (1900), "Padua", Cathedrals and Churches of Northern Italy, London: Laurie
- "Padua". Chambers's Encyclopaedia. London. 1901. hdl:2027/hvd.hn52jt.
- Ismar Elbogen (1905), "Padua", Jewish Encyclopedia, vol. 9, New York, hdl:2027/mdp.49015002282474
- Brown, Horatio Robert Forbes (1910). "Padua" . Encyclopædia Britannica. Vol. 20 (11th ed.). pp. 444–445.
- Benjamin Vincent (1910), "Padua", Haydn's Dictionary of Dates (25th ed.), London: Ward, Lock & Co., hdl:2027/uiug.30112097581703
- "Padua", Northern Italy (14th ed.), Leipzig: Karl Baedeker, 1913 + 1870 ed.
- Franke, Winfried (1968). "The Italian City-State System as an International System". In M. A. Kaplan (ed.). New Approaches to International Relations. St. Martin's Press. pp. 426–458.
- Luigi Lenzi (1928). "Padua, Italy. A Replanning Scheme: Illustrated". Town Planning Review. 13. University of Liverpool. ISSN 0041-0020.
- John Kenneth Hyde (1966). Padua in the Age of Dante. Manchester University Press.
- Benjamin G. Kohl (1972). "Government and Society in Renaissance Padua". Journal of Medieval and Renaissance Studies. ISSN 0047-2573.
- Kohl, Benjamin G. (1998). Padua under the Carrara, 1318–1405. Baltimore and London: Johns Hopkins University Press. ISBN 0-8018-5703-1.
- Trudy Ring; Robert M. Salkin, eds. (1995). "Padua". Southern Europe. International Dictionary of Historic Places. Vol. 3. Fitzroy Dearborn. ISBN 1884964052.
- Roy Domenico (2002). "Veneto: Padua". Regions of Italy: a Reference Guide to History and Culture. Greenwood. pp. 383+. ISBN 0313307334.
- Lawrin Armstrong (2004). "Padua". In Christopher Kleinhenz (ed.). Medieval Italy: an Encyclopedia. Routledge. pp. 815–823. ISBN 0415939291.
- Carrie E. Beneš (2011). "Padua: Rehousing the Relics of Antenor". Urban Legends: Civic Identity and the Classical Past in Northern Italy, 1250-1350. Pennsylvania State University Press. pp. 39–62. ISBN 978-0-271-03765-3.

=== in Italian ===
- Ludovico Antonio Muratori (1790) [1753], "Monaco padovano", Annali d'Italia (in Italian), vol. 8, Venice
- Simone Stratigo (1795). Dell'antico teatro di Padova (in Italian).
- Giannantonio Moschini (1817). Guida per la citta di Padova (in Italian). Venice: Fratelli Gamba.
- Augusto Meneghini (1859). Cesare Cantù (ed.). Padova e sua provincia (in Italian). Vol. 4. Milan: Corona e Caimi.
- Pietro Selvatico [in Italian] (1869). Guida di Padova e dei principali suoi contorni (in Italian). Padua: F. Sacchetto.
- "Padova". Nuova Enciclopedia Italiana (in Italian). Vol. 16 (6th ed.). Turin: Unione Tipografico-Editrice Torinese. 1884. hdl:2027/uc1.c2649814.
- Melchiorre Roberti (1902), Le corporazioni padovane d'arti e mestieri [Paduan guilds of arts and crafts], Memorie del Reale Istituto Veneto di Scienze, Lettere ed Arti (in Italian), vol. 26, Istituto Veneto di Scienze, Lettere ed Arti, pp. 30 v, hdl:2027/uc1.c2631112
