= Timeline of Modena =

The following is a timeline of the history of the city of Modena in the Emilia-Romagna region of Italy.

== Prior to 18th century ==
- 218 BCE – Siege of Mutina (218 BC).
- 193 BCE – Battle of Mutina (193 BC) fought near town.
- 187 BCE – Via Aemilia built, passing through Mutina.
- 183 BCE – Mutina becomes "seat of a Roman colony."
- 78 BCE – Mutina besieged by forces of Pompey during the Roman civil wars.
- 44 BCE – War of Mutina begins.
- 43 BCE – Battle of Mutina fought in vicinity of town.
- 312 CE – Roman Catholic diocese of Modena established (approximate date).
- 7th C. CE – Citta Geminiana established near Modena.
- 872 – Leodoino becomes bishop.
- 1054 – Eriberto becomes bishop.
- 1099 – Modena Cathedral construction begins.
- 1175 – University of Modena founded.
- 1179 – Torre della Ghirlandina (Cathedral bell tower) set up.
- 1184 – Modena Cathedral consecrated.
- 1288 – Obizzo II d'Este in power; Este rule continues until 1796.
- 1325 – Modenese forces fight the Bolognese in the Battle of Zappolino.
- 1336 – House of Este in power.
- 1338 – University of Modena closes.
- 1348 – Black Death plague outbreak.
- 1452 – Duchy of Modena and Reggio established.
- 1474 – Printing press in operation.
- 1476 – San Pietro church construction begins.
- 1598 – Biblioteca Estense (library) relocated to Modena from Ferrara.
- 1634 – Ducal Palace of Modena construction begins.
- 1663 – Sant'Agostino church refurbished.
- 1671 – June: Earthquake.
- 1677 – Demetrio Degni starts publishing its weekly gazette named Modona, it lasted until 1701
- 1680 – Accademia dei Dissonanti founded.
- 1683 – University of Modena reestablished.

== 18th–19th centuries ==
- 1703 – August: City occupied by French troops.
- 1707 – February: French troops depart.
- 1734 – July: City occupied by French troops.
- 1736 – May: French troops depart.
- 1742 – June: City occupied by Austrian troops.
- 1749 – February: Austrian troops depart.
- 1749 – 14 August: first issue of the newspaper Il Messaggiere, which lasted till 1859
- 1762 – Grande Ospedale Civile (hospital) built.
- 1771 – Grande Albergo dei Poveri (poorhouse) built.
- 1772 – University of Modena and Reggio Emilia re-established.
- 1797 – Modena becomes part of the French client Cisalpine Republic.
- 1815 – Military Academy of Modena active.
- 1816 – Fortifications dismantled.
- 1841 – Teatro Comunale Modena opens.
- 1859
  - Francis V, Duke of Modena deposed.
  - Modena railway station opens.
- 1860 – Modena becomes part of the Kingdom of Sardinia.
- 1872 – Verona-Modena railway begins operating.
- 1873 – Modena Synagogue built.
- 1877 – Il Cittadino newspaper begins publication.
- 1879 – Modena Cathedral interior restored .
- 1881 – Modena tram system begins operating, with horsecars
- 1888 – Teatro Storchi (theatre) built.
- 1893 – Modena-Maranello tramway begins operating.
- 1897 – Population: 67,658.

== 20th century ==
- 1906 – Population: 66,762.
- 1911 – Population: 70,923.
- 1912
  - Electric trams begin operating.
  - Modena F.C. (football club) formed.
- 1913 – Cinema Scala built.
- 1915 – Cinema Metropol built.
- 1916 – Ferrovia Ferrara-Modena (railway) begins operating.
- 1920 – Modena railway station rebuilt.
- 1931
  - Mercato Albinelli (market) opens.
  - Population: 92,757.
- 1936 – Stadio Alberto Braglia (stadium) opens.
- 1941 – AMCM (transit entity) formed.
- 1950
  - Trolleybus system begins operating.
  - Modena Autodrome racetrack opens.
- 1963 – Policlinico di Modena (health clinic) established.
- 1966 – November: Flood.
- 1967 – "Superachitettura" exhibit held.
- 1970 – Biblioteca civica Antonio Delfini (library) established.
- 1971 – Modena Airport opens.
- 1972 – September: Flood.
- 1981 – Gazzetta di Modena newspaper begins publication.
- 1996 – 15 October: Earthquake.^{(it)}

== 21st century ==
- 2001 – Azienda Trasporti Collettivi e Mobilità (transit entity) established.
- 2012 – May: Northern Italy earthquake sequence.
- 2013 – Population: 179,353.
- 2014
  - Flood.^{(it)}
  - Gian Carlo Muzzarelli becomes mayor.

== See also ==
- History of Modena
- List of mayors of Modena
- List of bishops of Modena
- List of dukes of Ferrara and of Modena, 1452–1859
- State Archives of Modena (state archives)
- History of Emilia (region of Italy)

Timelines of other cities in the macroregion of Northeast Italy:^{(it)}

- Emilia-Romagna region: Timeline of Bologna; Ferrara; Forlì; Parma; Piacenza; Ravenna; Reggio Emilia; Rimini
- Friuli-Venezia Giulia region: Timeline of Trieste
- Trentino-South Tyrol region: Timeline of Trento
- Veneto region: Timeline of Padua; Treviso; Venice; Verona; Vicenza

== Bibliography ==
=== in English ===
- William Smith, ed. (1872) [1854]. "Mutina". Dictionary of Greek and Roman Geography. London: John Murray. hdl:2027/hvd.ah5cur.
- "Modena", Hand-book for Travellers in Northern Italy (16th ed.), London: John Murray, 1897, OCLC 2231483
- Ismar Elbogen (1904), "Modena", Jewish Encyclopedia, vol. 8, New York, hdl:2027/mdp.49015002282243
- "Modena" . Encyclopædia Britannica. Vol. 18 (11th ed.). 1910. pp. 641–642.
- Benjamin Vincent (1910), "Modena", Haydn's Dictionary of Dates (25th ed.), London: Ward, Lock & Co., hdl:2027/uc2.ark:/13960/t41r6xh8t
- Edward Hutton (1912), "Modena", Cities of Lombardy, New York: Macmillan
- "Modena", Northern Italy (14th ed.), Leipzig: Karl Baedeker, 1913 (+ 1870 ed.)
- Riso, Federica Maria (4 May 2023). Roman funerary rituals in Mutina (Modena, Italy): a multidisciplinary approach. Oxford: Archaeopress. ISBN 9781803274799.
- Beth F. Wood (1995). "Modena". In Trudy Ring; Robert M. Salkin (eds.). Southern Europe. International Dictionary of Historic Places. Vol. 3. Fitzroy Dearborn. pp. 444–448. ISBN 1884964052.
- Christopher Kleinhenz, ed. (2004). "Modena". Medieval Italy: an Encyclopedia. Routledge. ISBN 0415939291.

=== in Italian ===
- L. Vedriani (1666). Historia di Modena (in Italian).
- Girolamo Tiraboschi, ed. (1825). "Mutina". Dizionario topografico storico degli stati estensi (in Italian).
- C. Campori (1864). Del governo a comune in Modena.
- Nicola Bernardini, ed. (1890). "Provincia di Modena". Guida della stampa periodica italiana (in Italian). Lecce: R. Tipografia editrice salentina dei fratelli Spacciante. p. 545+.
- Vicenzo Tardini. I teatri di Modena (in Italian). G.T. Vincenzi e nipoti. 1899–1902 (3 volumes)
- E. P. Vicini (1913). I podestà di Modena (1556–1796).
- "Modena", Enciclopedia Italiana (in Italian), 1934
