= List of presidents of the Province of Padua =

President of the Province of Padua
- Presidente della Provincia di Padova
- Incumbent; Daniele Canella since 16 September 2026
- Term length: 4 years
- Formation: 1889

The president of the Province of Padua is the head of the provincial government in Padua, Veneto, Italy. The president oversees the administration of the province, coordinates the activities of the municipalities, and represents the province in regional and national matters.

Since September 2026, the office has been held by Daniele Canella of Lega.

== List ==
=== Presidents of the Provincial Deputation (1889–1926) ===
No.	Portrait	Name	Term		Party
No.	Portrait	Name	Start	End	Party
1		Tullio Beggiato	1889	1895	?
2		Luigi Moroni	1895	1905	?
3		Federico Frizzerin	1905	1908	?
4		Vittorio Giusti	1908	1916 ?	?

=== Presidents of the Provincial Rectorate (1926–1945) ===
No.	Portrait	Name	Term of office		Party
No.	Portrait	Name	Start	End	Party
		Giuseppe Marangoni	1933	1939	National Fascist Party

=== Presidents of the Provincial Deputation (1945–1951) ===
No.	Portrait	Name	Term of office		Party
No.	Portrait	Name	Start	End	Party
1		Angelo Peggion	1945	1951	?

=== Presidents of the Province (1951–present) ===
No.	Portrait	Name	Term		Party
No.	Portrait	Name	Start	End	Party
1		Alberto Marcozzi	1951	1956	Christian Democracy
1		Alberto Marcozzi	1956	1960	Christian Democracy
2		Vittorio Marani	1960	1965	Christian Democracy
3		Marcello Olivi	1965	1970	Christian Democracy
4		Candido Tecchio	1970	1975	Christian Democracy
5		Giorgio Dal Pian	1975	1980	Christian Democracy
6		Giacomo Pontarollo	1980	1985	Christian Democracy
7		Franco Frigo	15 July 1985	26 July 1990	Christian Democracy
8		Lamberto Toscani	26 July 1990	1993	Christian Democracy
9		Giuseppe Barbieri	1993	8 May 1995	Christian Democracy
10		Renzo Sacco	8 May 1995	26 October 1998	Liga Veneta–Lega Nord
		Sergio Porena	26 October 1998	11 July 1999	Extraordinary commissioner
11		Vittorio Casarin	11 July 1999	29 June 2004	Forza Italia
11		Vittorio Casarin	29 June 2004	8 June 2009	Forza Italia
12		Barbara Degani	8 June 2009	14 April 2014	The People of Freedom
13		Enoch Soranzo	13 October 2014	31 October 2018	Brothers of Italy
14		Fabio Bui	31 October 2018	12 June 2022	Democratic Party
15		Sergio Giordani	10 September 2022	16 September 2026	Independent (centre-left)
16		Daniele Canella	16 September 2026	Incumbent	Liga Veneta–Lega

== Sources ==
- "Storia amministrativa dell'ente". Ministero dell'Interno.
- Agostini, Filiberto (2012). Il governo locale nel Veneto all'indomani della liberazione. Milan: FrancoAngeli.
- Menichini, Piera (2005). "I presidenti delle Province dall'Unità alla Grande guerra: repertorio analitico". Storia Amministrazione Costituzione (13): 269–270.
