= Asprea =

Asprea is a surname. Notable people with the surname include:

- Saverio Asprea (1932–2025), Italian politician
- Tomás Asprea (born 1995), Argentine footballer
