= Pier Luigi San Donnino =

Italian lawyer and politician (1846–1915)

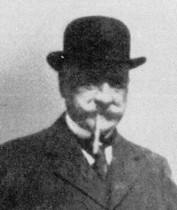

Member of the Italian Senate
- In office 19 December 1913 – 17 September 1915
- Monarch: Victor Emmanuel III

Mayor of Modena
- In office June 1908 – May 1910
- Preceded by: Luigi Albinelli
- Succeeded by: Cesare Pagani
- In office November 1912 – July 1914
- Preceded by: Cesare Pagani
- Succeeded by: Giuseppe Gambigliani Zoccoli

President of the Provincial Council of Modena
- In office 9 September 1907 – 1915
- Preceded by: Luigi Albinelli
- Succeeded by: Carlo Gallicci

President of the Province of Modena
- In office 1898–1904
- Preceded by: Domenico Pardini
- Succeeded by: Vincenzo Spinelli

Personal details
- Born: Pietro Luigi Battista Sandonnini; 21 June 1846 Modena, Duchy of Modena and Reggio
- Died: 17 September 1915 (aged 69) Modena, Kingdom of Italy
- Occupation: Lawyer

Pier Luigi San Donnino (born Pietro Luigi Battista Sandonnini; 21 June 1846 – 17 September 1915) was an Italian lawyer and politician. He served as a member of the Senate of the Kingdom of Italy from 19 December 1913 until his death in 1915. He was also mayor of Modena, president of the Province of Modena and chairman of the Provincial Council.
