= Renzo Sacco =

Italian politician (1944–2023)

President of the Province of Padua
- In office 8 May 1995 – 26 October 1998
- Preceded by: Giueseppe Barbieri
- Succeeded by: Vittorio Casarin

Personal details
- Born: 20 January 1944 Merlara, Italy
- Died: 6 January 2023 (aged 78) Padua, Italy
- Party: LN

Renzo Sacco (20 January 1944 – 6 January 2023) was an Italian politician. A member of Lega Nord, he served as president of the Province of Padua from 1995 to 1998.

Sacco died in Padua on 6 January 2023, at the age of 78.
