= List of presidents of the Province of Modena =

President of the Province of Modena
- Presidente della Provincia di Modena

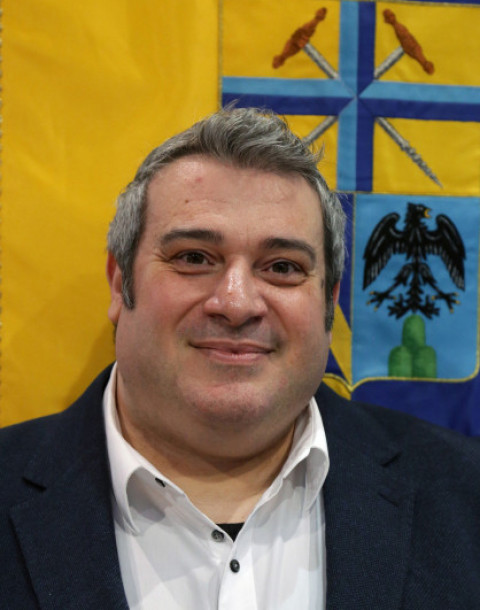
- Incumbent; Fabio Braglia since 29 January 2023
- Term length: 4 years
- Inaugural holder: Emilio Boccolari
- Formation: 1889

The president of the Province of Modena is the head of the provincial government in Modena, Emilia-Romagna, Italy. The president oversees the administration of the province, coordinates the activities of the municipalities, and represents the province in regional and national matters.

Since January 2023, the office has been held by Fabio Braglia of the Democratic Party.

== List ==
=== Presidents of the Provincial Deputation (1889–1926) ===
No.	Portrait	Name	Took office	Left office	Party
1		Emilio Boccolari	1889	1890	
2		Domenico Pardini	1890	1898	
3		Pier Luigi San Donnino	1898	1904	
4		Vincenzo Spinelli	1905	1905	
5		Lodovico Antonio Vaccari	1906	1915	
6		Giovanni Battista Taparelli	1915	1916	
7		Renzo Righi	1917	1920	
–		Giovanni Trincas (acting)	1921	4 January 1923	
8		Antonio Rizzi	4 January 1923	20 July 1925	National Fascist Party
9		Antonio Rebucci	20 July 1925	30 June 1927	National Fascist Party

=== Presidents of the Provincial Rectorate (1927–1945) ===
No.	Portrait	Name	Term start	Term end	Party
1		Marco Arturo Vicini	30 June 1927	6 April 1933	National Fascist Party
2		Clodo Feltri	6 April 1933	18 October 1936	National Fascist Party
—		Domenico Morelli	18 October 1936	22 February 1937	Prefectural commissioner
3		Paolo Casati Rollieri	22 February 1937	November 1941	National Fascist Party
4		Gian Paolo Solmi	November 1941	August 1943	National Fascist Party

=== Presidents of the Provincial Deputation (1945–1951) ===
No.	Portrait	Name	Term start	Term end	Party
1		Gregorio Agnini	1945	1945	Italian Socialist Party
2		Giuseppe Cerchiari	1945	1951	Italian Socialist Party

=== Presidents of the Province (1951–present) ===
No.	Portrait	Name	Term start	Term end	Party
1		Gaetano Bertelli	1951	1960	Italian Socialist Party
2		Vittorino Morselli	1960	1970	Italian Socialist Party
3		Sergio Rossi	1970	1975	Italian Communist Party
4		Saverio Asprea	1975	1980	Italian Socialist Party
5		Giuseppe Nuara	1980	1985	Italian Socialist Party
6		Giuliano Barbolini	12 May 1985	5 May 1990	Italian Communist Party
7		Giorgio Baldini	6 May 1990	22 April 1995	Italian Socialist Party
8		Graziano Pattuzzi	23 April 1995	21 July 1999	Italian People's Party; The Daisy
8		Graziano Pattuzzi	21 July 1999	13 June 2004	Italian People's Party; The Daisy
9		Emilio Sabattini	13 June 2004	8 June 2009	The Daisy; Democratic Party
9		Emilio Sabattini	8 June 2009	10 October 2014	The Daisy; Democratic Party
10		Gian Carlo Muzzarelli	10 October 2014	31 October 2018	Democratic Party
11		Gian Domenico Tomei	31 October 2018	28 January 2023	Democratic Party
12		Fabio Braglia	29 January 2023	Incumbent	Democratic Party

== Sources ==
- "Storia amministrativa dell'ente". Ministero dell'Interno.
- Guaraldi, Emanuele (2009). Breve storia della Provincia di Modena 1859–2009. Rome: Ediesse. p. 130.
- Magagnoli, Stefano; Bertucelli, Lorenzo (1995). Regime fascista e società modenese. Aspetti e problemi del fascismo locale (1922–1939). Modena: Mucchi. p. 95.
- Menichini, Piera (2005). "I presidenti delle Province dall'Unità alla Grande guerra: repertorio analitico". Storia Amministrazione Costituzione (13): 266–267.
