= Graziano Pattuzzi =

Italian politician (born 1955)

President of the Province of Modena
- In office 23 April 1995 – 13 June 2004
- Preceded by: Giorgio Baldini
- Succeeded by: Emilio Sabattini

Mayor of Sassuolo
- In office 15 June 2004 – 21 June 2009
- Preceded by: Laura Tosi
- Succeeded by: Luca Caselli

Personal details
- Born: 18 December 1955 (age 70) Pavullo nel Frignano, Province of Modena, Italy
- Party: Christian Democracy; Italian People's Party; The Daisy; Democratic Party

Graziano Pattuzzi (born 18 December 1955) is an Italian politician of the Democratic Party. He served as president of the Province of Modena from 1995 to 2004 and as mayor of Sassuolo from 2004 to 2009.

== Career ==
Pattuzzi began his political career in the Christian Democracy, serving as a municipal councillor in Pavullo nel Frignano from 1988 and subsequently as president of the Frignano mountain community. Following the dissolution of the Christian Democracy, he joined the Italian People's Party and later The Daisy.

In 1995, Pattuzzi was elected president of the Province of Modena and was re-elected in 1999. He served as president until 2004, when he was elected mayor of Sassuolo with 51.76% of the vote. Pattuzzi sought re-election as mayor in 2009, but was defeated in the runoff by Luca Caselli. He subsequently became president of Autostrada Regionale Cispadana S.p.A., the company responsible for the development of the Cispadana motorway.

In 2021, Pattuzzi was the centre-left candidate for mayor of Pavullo nel Frignano. He finished third in the first round with 25.01% of the vote and did not qualify for the runoff.
