= Emilio Sabattini =

Italian politician (born 1952)

- Sabattini in 2009

President of the Province of Modena
- In office 13 June 2004 – 10 October 2014
- Preceded by: Graziano Pattuzzi
- Succeeded by: Gian Carlo Muzzarelli

Vice president of Emilia-Romagna
- In office 6 July 1993 – 17 May 1995
- President: Pier Luigi Bersani
- Preceded by: Ivan Malavasi
- Succeeded by: Katia Zanotti

Member of the Legislative Assembly of Emilia-Romagna
- In office 28 May 1990 – 3 March 2000

Personal details
- Born: 14 May 1952 (age 74) Vignola, Province of Modena, Italy
- Party: Christian Democracy; Italian People's Party; The Daisy; Democratic Party

Emilio Sabattini (born 14 May 1952) is an Italian politician who served as president of the Province of Modena from 2004 to 2014. A member of the Christian Democracy before its dissolution, he subsequently joined the Italian People's Party, The Daisy, and later the Democratic Party. He also served as a member of the Legislative Assembly of Emilia-Romagna, regional assessor and vice president of Emilia-Romagna.

== Career ==
Sabattini began his political career in the Christian Democracy and was elected to the Regional Council of Emilia-Romagna in 1990. Following the dissolution of the Christian Democracy, he joined the Italian People's Party. He served as vice president of Emilia-Romagna in the regional government led by Pier Luigi Bersani, and was appointed regional assessor for Budget in 1995. Sabattini subsequently joined the Daisy and was among the politicians who joined the Democratic Party in 2007.

In the 2004 provincial election, Sabattini was elected president of the Province of Modena, receiving 259,496 votes (64.84%). He was supported by a centre-left coalition including the Democrats of the Left, the Daisy, Communist Refoundation Party, and the Federation of the Greens. Sabattini was re-elected in 2009, receiving 203,150 votes (52.42%).

In 2014, Sabattini was appointed chairman of Autostrada Campogalliano-Sassuolo S.p.A., the company established to oversee the construction of the Campogalliano–Sassuolo motorway link.
