= Giuseppe Nuara =

Italian politician (1936–2025)

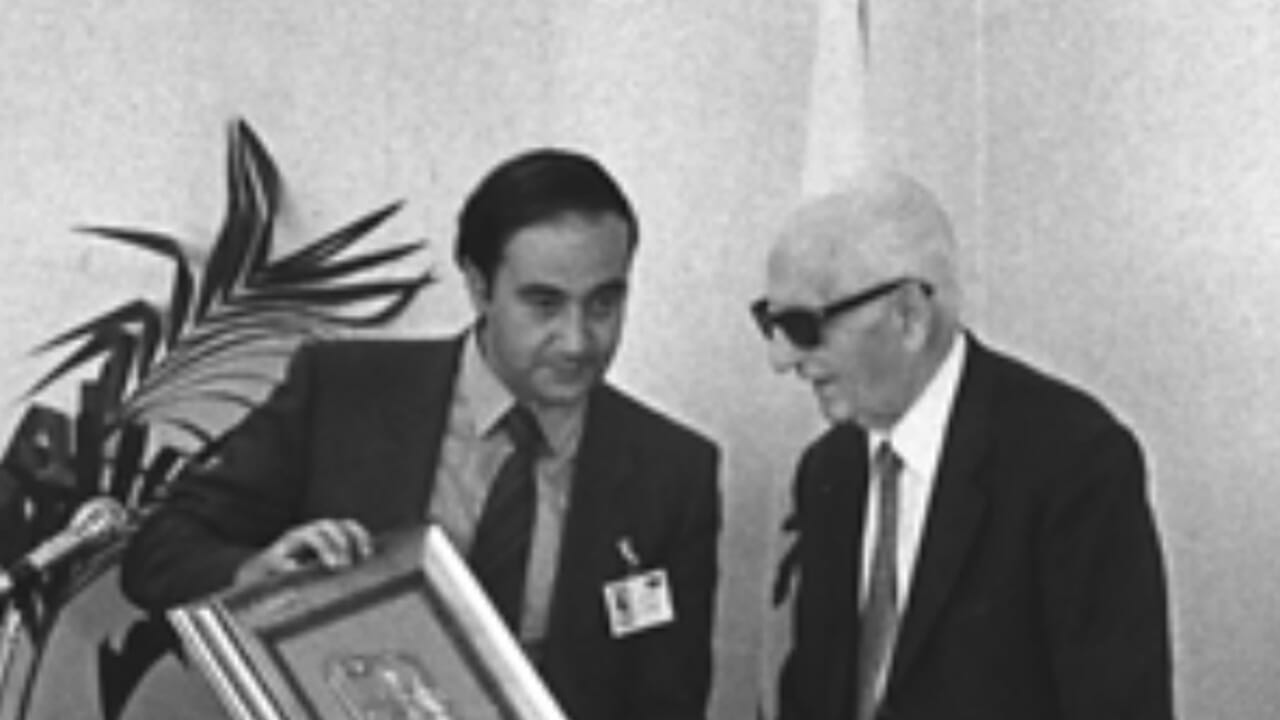
- Nuara delivering a plaque to Enzo Ferrari

President of the Province of Modena
- In office 1980 – 11 May 1985
- Preceded by: Saverio Asprea
- Succeeded by: Giuliano Barbolini

Personal details
- Born: 22 November 1936 Palermo, Italy
- Died: 14 June 2025 (aged 88) Modena, Italy
- Party: PSI

Giuseppe Nuara (22 November 1936 – 14 June 2025) was an Italian politician who was a member of the Italian Socialist Party, he served as president of the Province of Modena from 1980 to 1985.

Nuara died in Modena on 14 June 2025, at the age of 88.
