= Giorgio Dal Pian =

Italian politician (1935–2025)

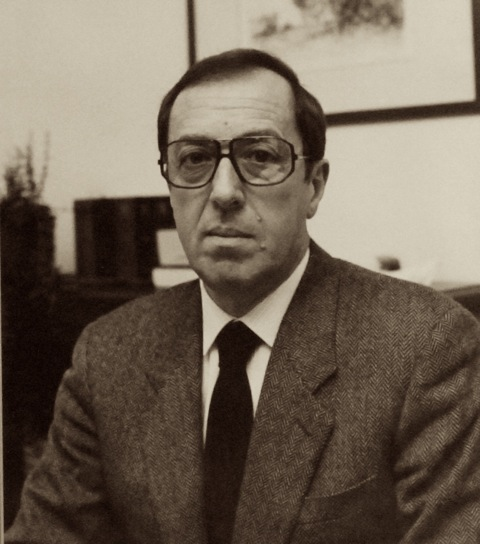

President of the Province of Padua
- In office 1975–1980
- Preceded by: Candido Tecchio
- Succeeded by: Giacomo Pontarollo

Mayor of Cittadella
- In office 1970–1975
- Preceded by: Antonio Pettenuzzo
- Succeeded by: Pietro Tosetto

Personal details
- Born: 22 April 1935 Cittadella, Province of Padua, Kingdom of Italy
- Died: 19 September 2025 (aged 90) Cittadella, Veneto, Italy
- Party: Christian Democracy
- Profession: Lawyer

Giorgio Dal Pian (22 April 1935 – 19 September 2025) was an Italian politician and lawyer who served as mayor of Cittadella (1970–1975) and president of the Province of Padua (1975–1980).

== Biography ==
He was a lawyer for many years with an office on Via Roma, in the historic center of Cittadella; he was the founder of Pro Cittadella, a co-founder of the Panathlon International Club Cittadella, and a member of the Rotary Club in the same city.

He also served as president of the Padua Fair Authority, the public transportation company SIAMIC, and Veneto Sviluppo.

In addition, in his spare time, he taught evening classes at the ITET Giacinto Girardi in Cittadella.
