= Sergio Giordani =

Italian politician and entrepreneur (born 1953)

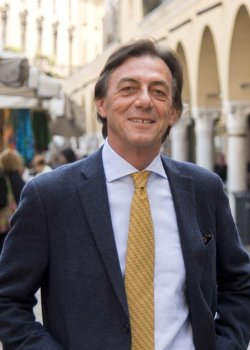

Mayor of Padua
- Incumbent
- Assumed office 28 June 2017
- Preceded by: Massimo Bitonci

President of the Province of Padua
- In office 10 September 2022 – 16 September 2026
- Preceded by: Fabio Bui
- Succeeded by: Daniele Canella

Personal details
- Born: 10 May 1953 (age 73) Padua, Italy
- Party: Centre-left independent
- Occupation: Politician, entrepreneur

Sergio Giordani (born 10 May 1953) is an Italian politician and entrepreneur who has served as mayor of Padua since 2017. He also served as president of the Province of Padua from 2022 to 2026.

== Life and career ==
=== Entrepreneurial career ===
He graduated as a technical expert. In the 1986–1987 season he joined the Board of Directors of Calcio Padova as a managing director. In 1990 he became vice president while in 1994 with the landing in Serie A he became president until 1996. He has held positions in the Padua Chamber of Commerce in PadovaFiere S.p.A. and at the Padua Civil Airport. He was the president of Calcio Padova from 1994 to 1996.

=== Personal life ===
Giordani is married to Lucia and has two children.

=== Mayor ===
Giordani is known for issuing birth certificates recognizing two-mom families as mayor of Padua, amid legal challenges.

Political offices
Preceded by Massimo Bitonci	Mayor of Padua; 2017–present	Succeeded by Incumbent
