= Gian Domenico Tomei =

Italian politician (born 1957)

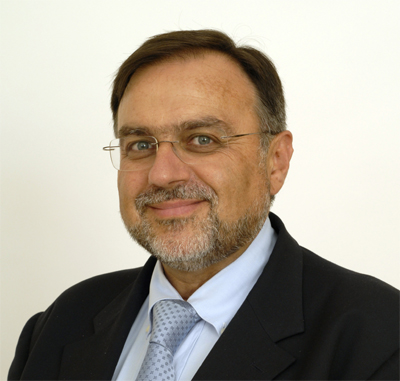

President of the Province of Modena
- In office 31 October 2018 – 29 January 2023
- Preceded by: Gian Carlo Muzzarelli
- Succeeded by: Fabio Braglia

Mayor of Polinago
- In office 27 May 2013 – 15 May 2023
- Preceded by: Armando Cabri
- Succeeded by: Simona Magnani
- In office 24 April 1995 – 14 June 2004
- Preceded by: Ermenegildo Casolari
- Succeeded by: Mara Marasti

Personal details
- Born: 2 August 1957 (age 69) Pavullo nel Frignano, Province of Modena, Italy
- Party: Christian Democracy; Italian People's Party; The Daisy; Democratic Party

Gian Domenico Tomei (born 2 August 1957) is an Italian politician who served as president of the Province of Modena from 2018 to 2023. He also served as mayor of Polinago.

Tomei was elected to the municipal council of Polinago in the 1980s as a member of the Christian Democracy, and was continuously re-elected until becoming mayor in 1995 with the Italian People's Party. In 2002, he joined The Daisy, with which he was elected to the Provincial Council of Modena in 2004. In 2009, he was appointed provincial assessor. He was re-elected mayor of Polinago in 2013 and again in 2018.

In October 2018, Tomei was elected president of the Province of Modena as the Democratic Party candidate, defeating Sandro Palazzi, the centre-right mayor of Finale Emilia. Tomei received 52,115 weighted votes (76.1%), compared with 16,394 (23.9%) for Palazzi.
