= Fabio Braglia =

Italian politician (born 1979)

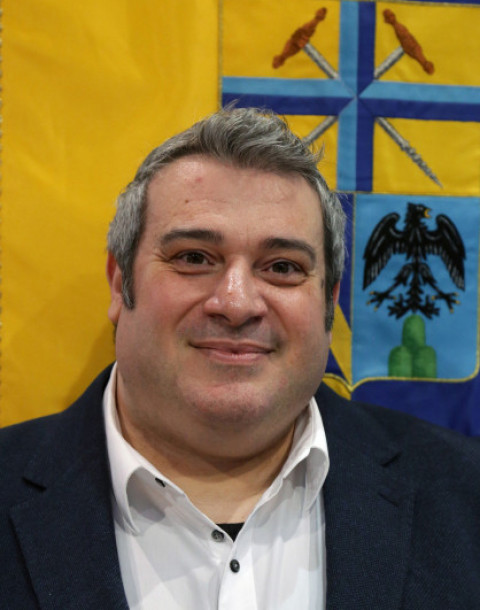

President of the Province of Modena
- Incumbent
- Assumed office 29 January 2023
- Preceded by: Gian Domenico Tomei

Mayor of Palagano
- Incumbent
- Assumed office 16 May 2011
- Preceded by: Paolo Galvani

Personal details
- Born: 27 August 1979 (age 47) Sassuolo, Emilia-Romagna, Italy
- Party: Democratic Party

Fabio Braglia (born 27 August 1979) is an Italian politician serving as president of the Province of Modena since 2023. He has served as mayor of Palagano since 2011.

In January 2023, Braglia was elected president of the Province of Modena as the Democratic Party candidate, defeating Enrico Diacci, the centre-right mayor of Novi di Modena. Braglia received 50,400 weighted votes (71.5%) against Diacci's 20,123 (28.5%).
