= Flavio Zanonato =

Italian politician (born 1950)

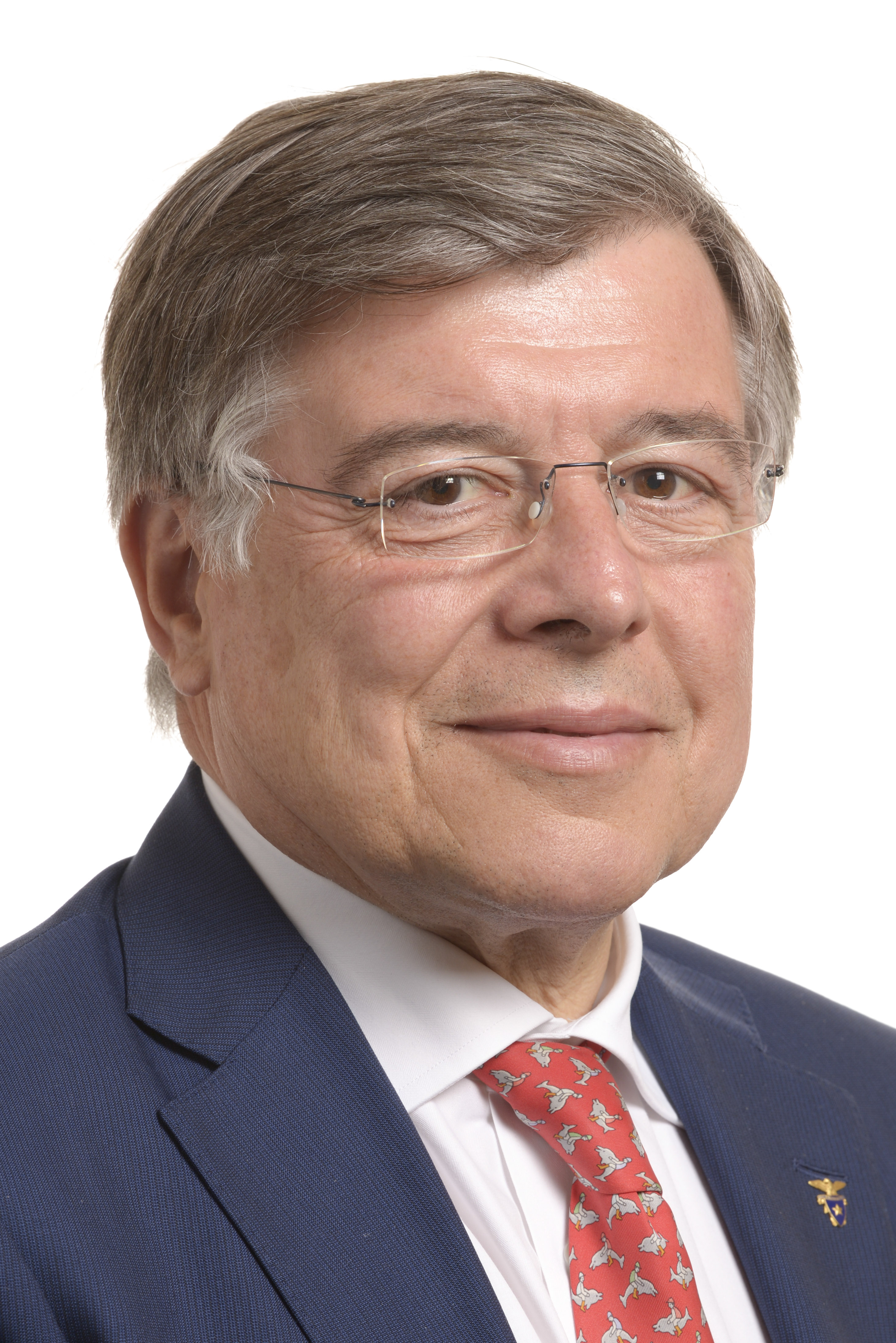

Member of the European Parliament for North-East Italy
- In office 1 July 2014 – 2 July 2019

Minister of Economic Development
- In office 28 April 2013 – 22 February 2014
- Prime Minister: Enrico Letta
- Preceded by: Corrado Passera
- Succeeded by: Federica Guidi

Mayor of Padua
- In office 14 June 2004 – 10 June 2013
- Preceded by: Giustina Destro
- Succeeded by: Massimo Bitonci
- In office 6 June 1993 – 27 June 1999
- Preceded by: Paolo Giaretta
- Succeeded by: Giustina Destro

Personal details
- Born: 24 July 1950 (age 76) Padua, Italy
- Party: Italian: Democratic Party; EU: Party of European Socialists
- Spouse: Lella Zanonato
- Children: Alessandro Zanonato
- Relatives: Anna Zanonato (grand-daughter)
- Education: University of Padua

Flavio Zanonato (born 24 July 1950 in Padua) is an Italian politician. He is the former mayor of Padua.

== Career ==
A long-time member of the Italian Communist Party and of its successor parties, he joined the Democratic Party.

After two terms as mayor of Padua (1993–1995, when he replaced Paolo Giaretta, and 1995–1999), he was defeated by Giustina Mistrello Destro in 1999. From 2000 to 2004 he was floor leader of the Democrats of the Left in the Regional Council of Veneto, where he was elected as the most voted regional deputy in the 2000 regional election.

In 2004 Zanonato defeated incumbent Giustina Mistrello Destro and was elected for the third time Mayor of Padua with an absolute majority of 51.9% at the first round.

In 2009 Zanonato defeated Marco Marin and was elected mayor of Padua for the fourth time in the second round run off winning 52% of the vote.

In March 2021, at the age of 70, Zanonato graduated in Philosophy at the University of Padua.

=== Minister of Economic Development, 2013–2014 ===
From April 2013 to February 2014 he was minister of economic development in the cabinet of Prime Minister Enrico Letta.

=== Member of the European Parliament, 2014–2019 ===
Zanonato became a Member of the European Parliament in the 2014 European elections. In Parliament, he was a member of the Committee on Industry, Research and Energy. In addition to his committee assignments, he served as a member of the European Parliament Intergroup on Western Sahara and the European Parliament Intergroup on Integrity (Transparency, Anti-Corruption and Organized Crime). He joined the Article 1 – Democratic and Progressive Movement in 2017.

== See also ==
- Municipal elections in Padua
