= Giorgio Pighi =

Italian politician

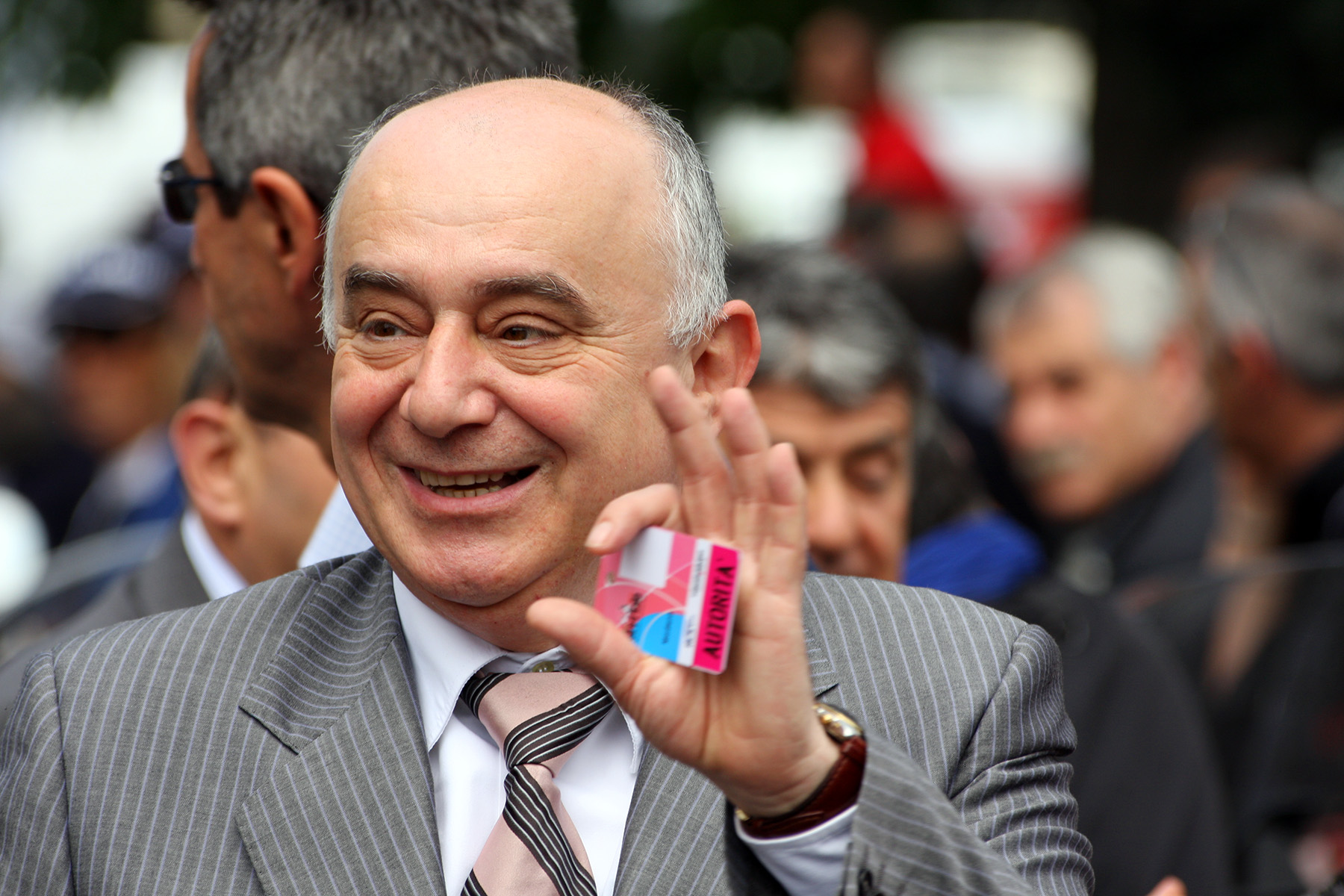

Mayor of Modena
- In office 14 June 2004 – 10 June 2014
- Preceded by: Giuliano Barbolini
- Succeeded by: Gian Carlo Muzzarelli

Personal details
- Born: 4 April 1949 (age 77) Modena, Italy
- Party: Democratic Party
- Occupation: lawyer, professor

Giorgio Pighi (born 4 April 1949) is an Italian politician, lawyer and professor.

He is a member of the Democratic Party.

== Biography ==
He was born in Modena, Italy. He graduated from the Muratori classical high school in Modena and then graduated with honors, in 1973, at the local university with a thesis on deviance and juvenile criminal law. In the following three years, he specialized in criminology with honors at the University of Genoa. In 1976 he obtained the qualification to solicitor. He is Professor of criminal law and urban security policies at the University of Modena and Reggio Emilia. In 1995 he was elected municipal councilor in the Municipality of Modena on the Democratic Party of the Left lists, a role he will hold until his election as mayor on 13 June 2004. He took office as Mayor of Modena on 14 June 2004. He was reconfirmed at the head of the city on 7 June 2009.

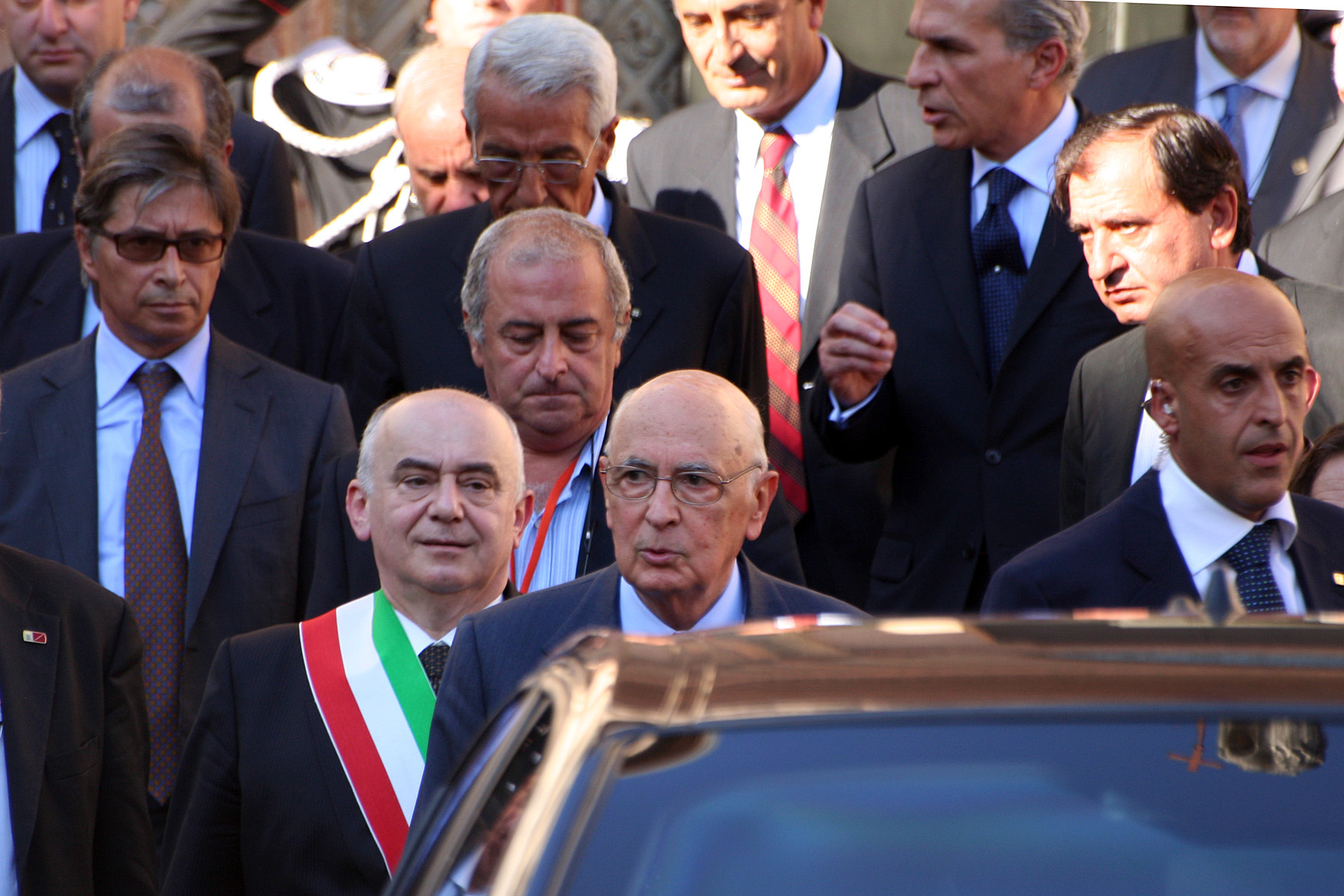
Modena - Pavarotti's death

Political offices
Preceded by Giuliano Barbolini	Mayor of Modena; 2004–2014	Succeeded by Gian Carlo Muzzarelli
