= Giuliano Barbolini =

Italian politician

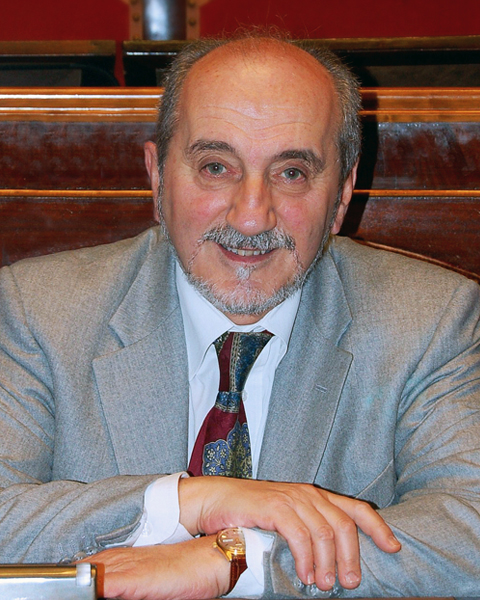

Mayor of Modena
- In office 24 April 1995 – 14 June 2004
- Preceded by: Mariangela Bastico
- Succeeded by: Giorgio Pighi

President of the Province of Modena
- In office 12 May 1985 – 5 May 1990
- Preceded by: Giuseppe Nuara
- Succeeded by: Giorgio Baldini

Member of the Italian Senate
- In office 28 April 2006 – 14 March 2013

Personal details
- Born: 20 August 1945 (age 80) Carpi, Emilia-Romagna, Italy
- Party: Democratic Party
- Occupation: Politician

Giuliano Barbolini (born 20 August 1945) is an Italian politician.

Barbolini is a member of the Democratic Party. He was elected mayor of Modena from 1995 to 2004.

== Biography ==
Barbolini was born in Carpi, Emilia-Romagna, and graduated from the University of Bologna. He was a researcher at the Institute of Archeology, he served as Librarian at the Estense and University National Library, and later as a director of the Municipality of Modena. Enrolled in the PCI in 1972, he has held numerous institutional positions since the 1980s. He was first assessor (1980–1985) and then President of the Province of Modena from 1985 to 1990. From 1990 to 1995, elected to the Regional Council, he was Councilor for Health and Social Services of the Emilia-Romagna Region. From 1995 to 2004 Giuliano was mayor of Modena, directly elected in the first round for two terms at the head of a center-left coalition.

He was elected member of the Italian Senate for two legislatures (2006–2013) of the Italian Republic. In 2013 he decided not to participate in the primaries called by the Democratic Party for the selection of future parliamentarians, and ended his experience in Parliament.

Political offices
Preceded by Mariangela Bastico	Mayor of Modena; 1995–2004	Succeeded by Giorgio Pighi
Preceded by Giuseppe Nuara	President of the Province of Modena; 1985–1990	Succeeded by Giorgio Baldini
