= Marcello Olivi =

Italian politician (1923–2012)

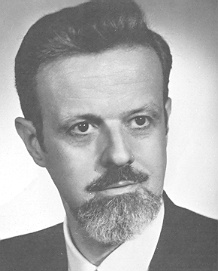

Member of the Chamber of Deputies
- In office 25 May 1972 – 4 July 1976

President of the Province of Padua
- In office 1965–1970
- Preceded by: Vittorio Marani
- Succeeded by: Candido Tecchio

Personal details
- Born: 19 June 1923 Genoa, Kingdom of Italy
- Died: 20 April 2012 (aged 88) Padua, Veneto, Italy
- Party: Christian Democracy
- Profession: Lawyer

Marcello Olivi (19 June 1923 – 20 April 2012) was an Italian politician and partisan commander who served as president of the Province of Padua (1965–1970) and a member of the Chamber of Deputies (1972–1976). A member of Christian Democracy, he was awarded the Silver Medal of Military Valor.
