= Daniele Canella =

Italian politician (born 1991)

President of the Province of Padua
- Incumbent
- Assumed office 16 September 2026
- Preceded by: Sergio Giordani

Mayor of San Giorgio delle Pertiche
- Incumbent
- Assumed office 27 May 2019
- Preceded by: Piergiorgio Prevedello

Personal details
- Born: 20 January 1991 (age 35) Camposampiero, Veneto, Italy
- Party: Lega

Daniele Canella (born 20 January 1991) is an Italian politician serving as president of the Province of Padua since 2026. He has also served as mayor of San Giorgio delle Pertiche since 2019.

== Life and career ==
Canella was born in 1991 in Camposampiero, in the province of Padua. He graduated from the Isaac Newton scientific high school in his hometown in 2009, and works as a self-employed insurance agent.

Canella was elected mayor of San Giorgio delle Pertiche in the 2019 municipal elections, receiving 61.9% of the vote. He was re-elected in 2024.

A member of the Lega, Canella served as vice president of the Province of Padua during the second half of Sergio Giordani's term. He was also a member of the national assembly of the Union of Italian Provinces (UPI) and of the executive board of UPI Veneto. In September 2026, Canella was elected president of the Province of Padua. At 35, he became the youngest president in the history of the Province of Padua and the youngest provincial president in Italy.
