= Massimo Mezzetti =

Italian politician

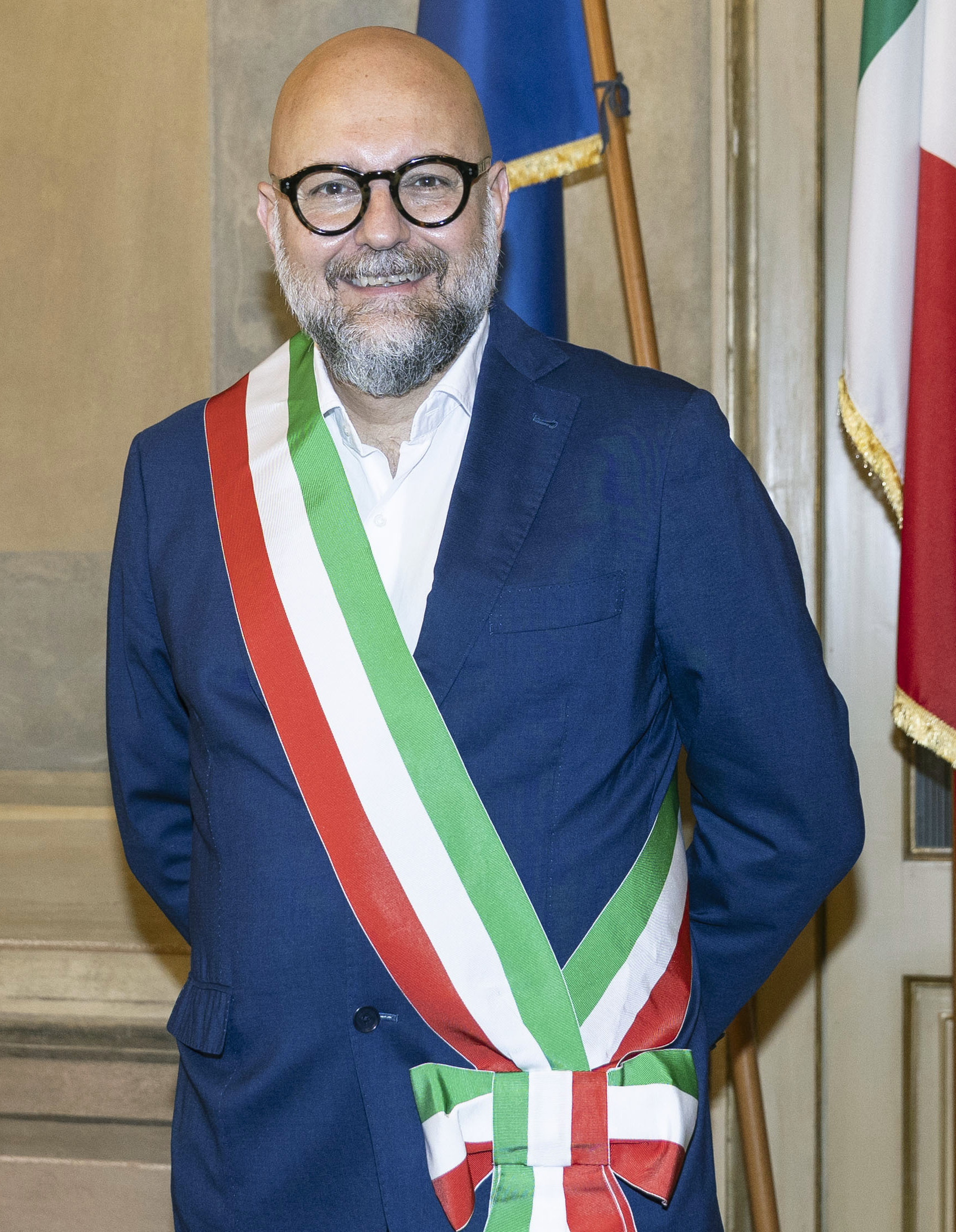

Mayor of Modena
- Incumbent
- Assumed office 12 June 2024
- Preceded by: Gian Carlo Muzzarelli

Personal details
- Born: 21 May 1962 (age 64) Rome, Italy
- Party: Independent
- Spouse: Arianna
- Children: 1
- Parents: Lamberto (father); Gilda (mother)
- Education: Sapienza University of Rome
- Occupation: Politician
- Website: massimomezzetti.it

Massimo Mezzetti (21 May 1962) is an Italian politician and incumbent Mayor of Modena since 2024.

He is a member of the Independent party. From September 2021 to June 2024 he was the General Director of the Biografilm Festival in Bologna. In April 2023,he was appointed by the Municipality as a member of the Board of Directors of the newly established ago foundation. He became its President until March 2024.On 10 May 2010 he was appointed councillor with responsibility for culture and sport in the regional council of Emilia-Romagna in the SEL quota, remaining in office until 2020, being confirmed as regional councillor in the Bonaccini council with responsibility for culture, legality and youth policies.

== Biography ==
Massimo Mezzetti was born in Rome, Italy in 1962. He origin from Abruzzo province of L'Aquila. His father Lamberto from Rocca Pia and his mother Gilda from Pacentro, he always grew up in Rome. He graduated from the Plinio Seniore state scientific high school. He moved to Modena in 1989. He is married to Arianna they have one son.

== See also ==
- List of mayors of Modena

Political offices
Preceded by Gian Carlo Muzzarelli	Mayor of Modena; 2024	Succeeded by
