= Siege of Mutina (218 BC) =

218 BC siege of the Second Punic War

- Part of the Second Punic War
Date	218 BC
Location	Northern Italy
Result	Roman victory

Belligerents
Rome	Boii

The siege of Mutina in 218 BC constitutes one of the first episodes of the Second Punic War. Hannibal's diplomacy in Cisalpine Gaul persuaded the Gallic Boii and Insubres tribes to revolt and drive the Roman colonists out of Piacenza (Placentia) and push them as far as Modena (Mutina), which was then besieged.

== Prelude ==
Roman imperialism first brought its armies north of the Po (river) in 224 BC. The long resistance of the Gallic tribes, especially the Boii, shows how harsh the wars conducted in these and subsequent years were. The commanders of that year were the two consuls Titus Manlius Torquatus and Quinto Fulvius Flaccus . This Roman offensive was in reaction to the Gallic invasion which led to the Battle of Telamon (225 BC). Immediately afterwards the Romans crossed the Apennines and poured into the territories of the Boii. The following years saw the consuls Gaius Flaminius Nepos and Publius Furius Philus (223 BC) defeat the Insubres and obtain a triumph De Galleis, although Flaminius was refused for religious and political reasons. In 222 BC there were the decisive Roman victories of Clastidium and the capture of the Insubri capital of Mediolanum (Milan).

To consolidate its dominion, Rome created the colonies of Placentia in the territory of the Boii, and Cremona in that of the Insubres. The Gauls of northern Italy would rebel again following the descent of Hannibal.

== Siege ==
Once besieging Mutina, the Gauls, who were inexperienced in siegecraft, staying "lazily and inertly camped under the walls" of the city, pretended to negotiate peace. Livy says that the Gaulish leaders invited the Roman ambassadors for talks, but after taking them prisoner, violating every kind of "law of the people", they refused to free them if the Romans did not return to them their own hostages.

Revolt of the Boii and Insubres, 218 BC

When this news reached the Roman praetor Lucius Manlius Vulsone he was enraged, and led his army in a disorderly manner towards the city, around which spread numerous forests. He was ambushed by the Gauls and, due to carelessness, having not explored the territory adequately beforehand, he barely managed to take refuge in an open field, suffering numerous losses.

Having then placed and fortified his camps, he regained courage even though he had suffered losses of [500-1,000 men]. After resuming its march, the Roman army encountered more forests. Once again the Gauls attacked, this time the Roman rearguard, and once again carried out a great massacre: 700 Roman casualties and six captured standards.

Having once again reached a plain, the Romans took refuge in the nearby village of TanetoTannetum, near the Po. Here they fortified themselves again and arranged for the transport of their supplies on the river, thanks to the 'help of the Cenomani Gauls and the inhabitants of Brixia.

== Result ==
As soon as the news of the sudden revolt of the Gauls arrived, the Senate sent the praetor Gaius Atilius Serrano with a legion and 5,000 allies, who had recently been enlisted by the consul Publius Cornelius Scipio. Atilius arrived at Tannetum without being attacked, since the Gauls had retreated from Mutina out of fear.

== Sources ==
- Brizzi Giovanni (1997). Storia di Roma. 1. Dalle origini ad Azio. Bologna: Patron.
- Stephen L. Dyson (1985). The creation of the roman frontier. Princenton University Press. ISBN 978-0-691-03577-2.
- Piganiol André (1989). Le conquiste dei romani. Milano: Il Saggiatore.
- Howard H.Scullard (1992). Storia del mondo romano. Dalla fondazione di Roma alla distruzione di Cartagine. Vol. I. Milano: BUR.
