= Paolo Giaretta =

Italian politician

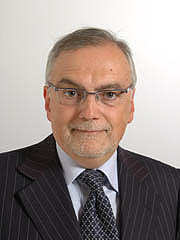
Paolo Giaretta

Paolo Giaretta (born 14 March 1947) is an Italian politician from Veneto.

He was born in Padua.

A long-time Christian Democrat, Giaretta was Mayor of Padua from 1987 to 1993. In 1994, after the dissolution of Christian Democracy, he joined the Italian People's Party and, later, to Democracy is Freedom – The Daisy and the Democratic Party. He was elected to the Italian Senate in 1996, 2001, 2006 and 2008. Between 2007 and 2009 he was the first regional secretary of the Democratic Party in Veneto.
