= Saverio Asprea =

Italian politician (1932–2025)

President of the Province of Modena
- In office 1975–1980
- Preceded by: Sergio Rossi
- Succeeded by: Giuseppe Nuara

Personal details
- Born: 23 August 1932 Locri, Italy
- Died: 8 June 2025 (aged 92) Carpi, Italy
- Party: PSI
- Education: University of Florence
- Occupation: Jurist

Saverio Asprea (23 August 1932 – 8 June 2025) was an Italian politician. A member of the Italian Socialist Party, he served as president of the Province of Modena from 1975 to 1980.

Asprea died in Carpi on 8 June 2025, at the age of 92.
