= List of mayors of Padua =

Mayor of Padua
- Sindaco di Padova

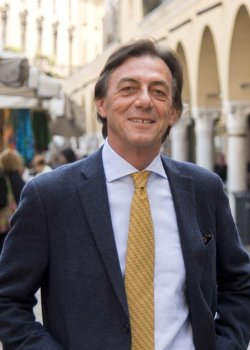
- Incumbent; Sergio Giordani since 28 June 2017
- Style: No title, courtesy or style
- Appointer: Electorate of Padua
- Term length: 5 years, renewable once
- Formation: 5 December 1866
- Website: Official website

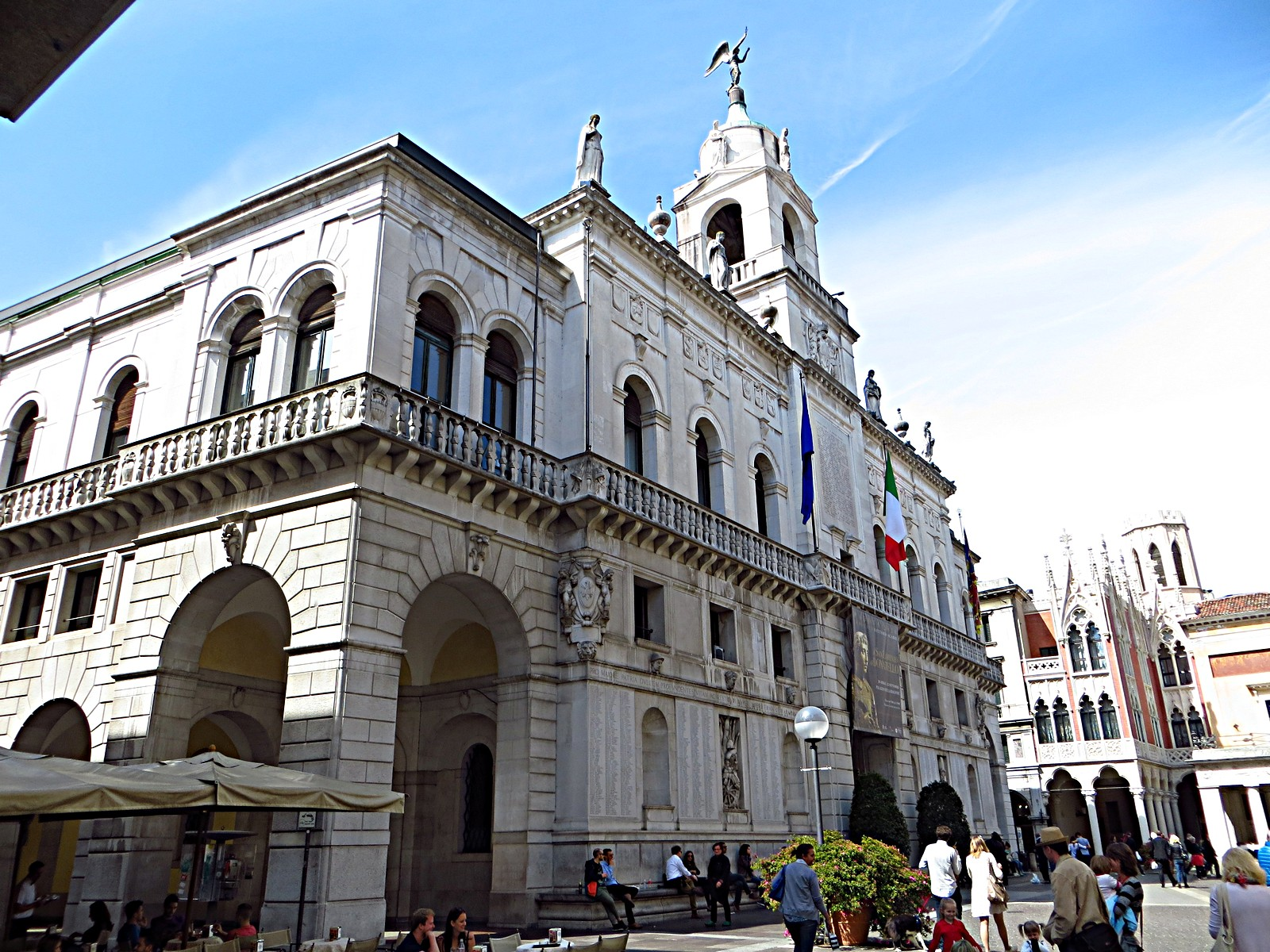
Padua's City Hall

The Mayor of Padua is an elected politician who, along with the Padua's city council, is accountable for the strategic government of Padua in Veneto, Italy.

The current mayor is Sergio Giordani a centre-left independent, who took office on 28 June 2017.

== Overview ==
According to the Italian Constitution, the mayor of Padua is member of the city council.

The mayor is elected by the population of Padua, who also elect the members of the city council, controlling the mayor's policy guidelines and is able to enforce his resignation by a motion of no confidence. The mayor is entitled to appoint and release the members of his government.

Since 1995 the mayor is elected directly by Padua's electorate: in all mayoral elections in Italy in cities with a population higher than 15,000 the voters express a direct choice for the mayor or an indirect choice voting for the party of the candidate's coalition. If no candidate receives at least 50% of votes, the top two candidates go to a second round after two weeks. The election of the City Council is based on a direct choice for the candidate with a preference vote: the candidate with the majority of the preferences is elected. The number of the seats for each party is determined proportionally.

== List ==
=== Republic of Italy (since 1946) ===
From 1945 to 1995, the Mayor of Padua was elected by the City Council.

	Mayor	Term start	Term end	Party
1	Giuseppe Schiavon	28 April 1945	19 April 1946	PCI
2	Gastone Costa	19 April 1946	26 April 1947	PSIUP
3	Cesarino Crescente	26 April 1947	12 December 1970	DC
4	Ettore Bentsik	12 December 1970	5 May 1977	DC
5	Luigi Merlin	5 May 1977	9 April 1980	DC
(4)	Ettore Bentsik	9 April 1980	28 April 1981	DC
6	Guido Montesi	28 April 1981	26 August 1982	DC
7	Settimo Gottardo	26 August 1982	7 June 1987	DC
8	Paolo Giaretta	7 June 1987	6 June 1993	DC
9	Flavio Zanonato	6 June 1993	8 May 1995	PDS

Since 1995, under provisions of new local administration law, the Mayor of Padua is chosen by direct election, originally every four, and since 1999 every five years.

	Mayor	Term start	Term end	Party	Coalition	Election
(9)	Flavio Zanonato (b. 1950)	8 May 1995	27 June 1999	PDS	PDS • PPI	1995
10	Giustina Mistrello Destro (b. 1945)	27 June 1999	14 June 2004	FI	FI • AN	1999
(9)	Flavio Zanonato (b. 1950)	14 June 2004	23 June 2009	DS; PD	The Olive Tree (DS-DL-SDI-FdV)	2004
(9)	Flavio Zanonato (b. 1950)	23 June 2009	10 June 2013 (Note: Resigned after swearing in as Minister of Economic Development in the Letta Cabinet.)	DS; PD	PD • IdV • SEL	2009
-	Ivo Rossi (b. 1955) (acting)	10 June 2013	10 June 2014	PD	PD • IdV • SEL	2009
11	Massimo Bitonci (b. 1965)	10 June 2014	12 November 2016 (Note: Ousted out of office after losing the majority in the City Council.)	LV	LV • FI	2014
Special Prefectural Commissioner tenure (12 November 2016 – 28 June 2017) (Note: Nominated by the Prefect after the majority of the city councillors resigned in order to oust the Mayor out of office.)
12	Sergio Giordani (b. 1953)	28 June 2017	14 June 2022	Ind	PD and leftist lists	2017
12	Sergio Giordani (b. 1953)	14 June 2022	In office	Ind	PD and leftist lists	2022

== Elections ==
=== Mayoral and City Council election, 1995 ===
The election took place on two rounds: the first on 23 April, the second on 7 May 1995.

Results

Summary of the 1995 Padua City Council election results
Parties and coalitions		Votes	%	Seats
Democratic Party of the Left (Partito Democratico della Sinistra)	PDS	35,562	27.12	16
Italian People's Party (Partito Popolare Italiano)	PPI	12,169	9.28	5
Pact of Democrats (Patto dei Democratici)	PD	5,184	3.95	2
Federation of the Greens (Federazione dei Verdi)	FdV	4,023	3.07	1
Others		3,181	2.43	0
Zanonato coalition (Centre-left)		60,119	45.85	24
Forza Italia	FI	31,612	24.11	8
National Alliance (Alleanza Nazionale)	AN	20,311	15.51	5
Others		4,023	3.06	0
Gentile coalition (Centre-right)		55,966	42.68	13
Liga Veneta-Lega Nord	LV-LN	8,875	6.70	2
Communist Refoundation Party (Rifondazione Comunista)	PRC	5,349	4.08	1
Others		900	0.69	0
Total		131,119	100.00	40
Votes cast / turnout		158,406	84.82	
Registered voters		186,745		
Source: Ministry of the Interior

Candidate	Party	Coalition	First round		Second round	
Candidate	Party	Coalition	Votes	%	Votes	%
Flavio Zanonato	PDS	PDS-PPI-PD-FdV	47,787	31.95	82,700	59.76
Francesco Gentile	FI	Pole for Freedoms	57,771	38.62	55,685	40.24
Luigi Mariani	LV-LN		33,311	22.27		
Others			10,701	7.15		
Eligible voters			186,745	100.00	186,745	100.00
Voted			158,406	84.82	142,253	76.32
Blank or invalid ballots			8,836		4,138	
Total valid votes			149,570		138,385	

=== Mayoral and City Council election, 1999 ===
The election took place on two rounds: the first on 13 June, the second on 27 June 1999.

Results

Summary of the 1999 Padua City Council election results
Parties and coalitions		Votes	%	Seats
Forza Italia	FI	21,487	19.27	12
Together for Padua (Insieme per Padova)	IpP	12,528	11.24	6
National Alliance (Alleanza Nazionale)	AN	11,470	10.29	6
Others		7,619	6.83	0
Mistrello Destro coalition (Centre-right)		53,104	47.63	24
Democrats of the Left (Democratici di Sinistra)	DS	35,562	27.12	16
Italian People's Party (Partito Popolare Italiano)	PPI	12,169	9.28	4
Pact of Democrats (I Democratici)	Dem	8,055	7.22	2
Federation of the Greens (Federazione dei Verdi)	FdV	2,804	2.51	1
Communist Refoundation Party (Rifondazione Comunista)	PRC	2,634	2.36	0
Zanonato coalition (Centre-left)		47,086	42.23	15
Liga Veneta-Lega Nord	LV-LN	5,416	4.86	1
Others		5,889	5.28	0
Total		111,495	100.00	40
Votes cast / turnout		136,380	75.09	
Registered voters		181,623		
Source: Ministry of the Interior

Candidate	Party	Coalition	First round		Second round	
Candidate	Party	Coalition	Votes	%	Votes	%
Giustina Mistrello Destro	FI	Pole for Freedoms	54,350	42.22	57,047	50.55
Flavio Zanonato	DS	The Olive Tree	53,552	41.60	55,807	49.45
Luciano Gasperini	LV-LN		6,260	4.86		
Others			14,568	11.33		
Eligible voters			181,623	100.00	181,623	100.00
Voted			136,380	75.09	115,952	63.84
Blank or invalid ballots			7,640		3,098	
Total valid votes			128,740		112,854	

=== Mayoral and City Council election, 2004 ===
The election took place on 12–13 June 2004.

Results

Summary of the 2004 Padua City Council election results
Parties and coalitions		Votes	%	Seats
Democrats of the Left (Democratici di Sinistra)	DS	18,845	16.01	8
Italian Democratic Socialists (Socialisti Democratici Italiani)	SDI	14,981	12.72	7
The Daisy (La Margherita)	DL	13,811	11.73	6
Federation of the Greens (Federazione dei Verdi)	FdV	4,027	3.42	1
Communist Refoundation Party (Rifondazione Comunista)	PRC	3,006	2.55	1
Others		5,456	4.64	1
Zanonato coalition (Centre-left)		60,126	51.07	24
Forza Italia	FI	27,577	23.42	10
National Alliance (Alleanza Nazionale)	AN	8,472	7.20	2
Union of the Centre (Unione di Centro)	UDC	4,068	3.46	1
Others		474	0.40	0
Mistrello Destro coalition (Centre-right)		40,591	34.48	13
Zanesco List (Lista Zanesco)	LZ	6,024	5.12	2
Liga Veneta-Lega Nord	LV-LN	5,337	4.53	1
Others		5,223	4.28	0
Total		117,740	100.00	40
Votes cast / turnout		135,606	78.09	
Registered voters		173,662		
Source: Ministry of the Interior

Candidate	Party	Coalition	First round	
Candidate	Party	Coalition	Votes	%
Flavio Zanonato	DS	The Olive Tree	67,682	51.88
Giustina Mistrello Destro	FI	House of Freedoms	43,846	33.61
Luigi Zanesco	Ind		6,996	5.36
Luciano Gasperini	LV-LN		5,619	4.31
Others			6,311	4.84
Eligible voters			173,662	100.00
Voted			135,606	78.09
Blank or invalid ballots			5,152	
Total valid votes			130,454	

=== Mayoral and City Council election, 2009 ===
The election took place on two rounds: the first on 6–7 June, the second on 21–22 June 2009.

Results

Summary of the 2009 Padua City Council election results
Parties and coalitions		Votes	%	Seats
Democratic Party (Partito Democratico)	PD	32,297	28.44	16
Italy of Values (Italia dei Valori)	IdV	6,302	5.55	3
Zanonato List (Lista Zanonato)		6,058	5.33	3
Left for Padua (Sinistra per Padova)	SpP	2,506	2.21	1
Federation of the Left (Federazione della Sinistra)	FdS	2,494	2.20	1
Others		1,955	1.72	0
Zanonato coalition (Centre-left)		51,612	45.45	24
The People of Freedom (Il Popolo della Libertà)	PdL	27,048	23.82	9
Liga Veneta-Lega Nord	LV-LN	12,523	11.03	3
Marin List (Lista Marin)		9,786	8.62	3
Others		1,763	1.56	0
Marin coalition (Centre-right)		51,120	45.03	15
Union of the Centre (Unione di Centro)	UDC	3,800	3.35	1
Others		7,029	6.21	0
Total		113,561	100.00	40
Votes cast / turnout		125,811	74.93	
Registered voters		167,905		
Source: Ministry of the Interior

Candidate	Party	Coalition	First round		Second round	
Candidate	Party	Coalition	Votes	%	Votes	%
Flavio Zanonato	PD	PD-IdV-SEL-FdS-PSI	55,808	45.68	56,001	52.02
Marco Marin	PdL	PdL-LV-PP	54,835	44.88	51,660	47.98
Oreste Terranova	UDC		3,806	3.11		
Carlo Covi	PNE		2,184	1.79		
Maurizio D'Este	M5S		2,149	1.76		
Aurora D'Agostino	FdV		945	0.77		
Andrea Minchio	FN		571	0.47		
Others			1,885	1.65		
Eligible voters			167,905	100.00	167,905	100.00
Voted			125,811	74.93	109,159	65.01
Blank or invalid ballots			3,628		1,498	
Total valid votes			122,183		107,661	

=== Mayoral and City Council election, 2014 ===
The election took place on two rounds: the first on 25 May, the second on 9 June 2014.

Results

Summary of the 2014 Padua City Council election results
Parties and coalitions		Votes	%	Seats
Democratic Party (Partito Democratico)	PD	26,700	24.93	7
Rossi List (Lista Rossi)		6,208	5.80	1
Others		(Note: The candidate was endorsed by 5 more lists on the second round.)16,517	15.48	2
Rossi coalition (Centre-left)		49,479	46.20	(Note: Even if the coalition received more votes, the candidate lost on the second round and was not able to win the majority bonus, which was given to the winner.)10
Bitonci List (Lista Bitonci)		17,489	16.67	10
Forza Italia	FI	7,967	7.44	4
Liga Veneta-Lega Nord	LV-LN	5,237	4.89	3
Brothers of Italy (Fratelli d'Italia)	FdI	1,431	1.34	0
Others		(Note: The candidate was endorsed by 9 more lists on the second round.)13,105	12.25	3
Bitonci coalition (Centre-right)		45,589	42.57	20
Five Star Movement (Movimento Cinque Stelle)	M5S	9,478	8.85	2
Others		2,549	2.39	0
Total		107,095	100.00	32
Votes cast / turnout		114,528	70.09	
Registered voters		163,393		
Source: Ministry of the Interior

Candidate	Party	Coalition	First round		Second round	
Candidate	Party	Coalition	Votes	%	Votes	%
Massimo Bitonci	LV	LV-FI-FdI	34,890	31.42	51,702	53.50
Ivo Rossi	PD	PD-SEL-IdV	37,488	33.76	44,943	46.50
Maurizio Saia	NCD		11,805	10.63		
Francesco Fiore	SC		11,004	9.91		
Simone Borile	M5S		9,590	8.64		
Others			6,259	5.63		
Eligible voters			163,393	100.00	163,393	100.00
Voted			114,528	70.09	98,075	60.02
Blank or invalid ballots			3,492		1,430	
Total valid votes			111,036		96,645	

=== Mayoral and City Council election, 2017 ===
The election took place on two rounds: the first on 11 June, the second on 26 June 2017.

Results

Summary of the 2017 Padua City Council election results
Parties and coalitions		Votes	%	Seats
Democratic Party (Partito Democratico)	PD	12,028	13.49	6
Civic Coalition (Coalizione Civica) (Note: Officially endorsed the candidate only on the second round.)	CC	10,212	11.45	5
Lorenzoni List (Lista Lorenzoni) (Note: Officially endorsed the candidate only on the second round.)		9,329	10.46	4
Giordani List (Lista Giordani)		8,318	9.33	4
Others		6,583	7.39	1
Giordani coalition (Centre-left)		46,470	52.11	20
Bitonci List (Lista Bitonci)		21,500	24.11	8
Liga Veneta-Lega Nord	LV-LN	5,919	6.64	2
Forza Italia	FI	3,490	3.91	1
Brothers of Italy (Fratelli d'Italia)	FdI	1,888	2.12	0
Others		2,688	3.01	0
Bitonci coalition (Centre-right)		35,485	39.79	11
Five Star Movement (Movimento Cinque Stelle)	M5S	4,896	5.49	1
Others		2,333	2.61	0
Total		89,184	100.00	32
Votes cast / turnout		99,603	60.77	
Registered voters		163,890		
Source: Ministry of the Interior

Candidate	Party	Coalition	First round		Second round	
Candidate	Party	Coalition	Votes	%	Votes	%
Sergio Giordani	Ind	PD-PSI	28,593	29.21	47,888	51.84
Massimo Bitonci	LV	LV-FI-FdI	39,413	40.26	44,488	48.16
Arturo Lorenzoni	Ind		22,357	22.84		
Simone Borile	M5S		5,140	5.25		
Luigi Salvatore Sposato	PdF		1,528	1.56		
Others			870	0.89		
Eligible voters			163,890	100.00	163,890	100.00
Voted			99,603	60.77	93,470	57.03
Blank or invalid ballots			1,702		1,094	
Total valid votes			97,901		92,376	

=== Mayoral and City Council election, 2022 ===
The election took place on 12 June 2022.

Results

Summary of the 2022 Padua City Council election results
Parties and coalitions		Votes	%	Seats
Democratic Party (Partito Democratico)	PD	16,815	21.66	10
Giordani List (Lista Giordani)		13,409	17.28	7
Civic Coalition (Coalizione Civica)	CC	4,612	5.94	2
Others		10,529	13.57	2
Giordani coalition (Centre-left)		45,365	58.45	21
Brothers of Italy (Fratelli d'Italia)	FdI	6,421	8.27	4
Peghin List (Lista Peghin)	LP	6,065	7.81	3
League (Lega)	L	5,704	7.35	2
Coraggio Italia	CI	3,392	4.37	1
Forza Italia	FI	2,486	3.20	1
Others		1,707	2.20	0
Peghin coalition (Centre-right)		25,775	33.21	11
3V Movement (Movimento 3V)	3V	1,613	2.08	0
Others		4,866	5.54	0
Total		77,619	100.00	32
Votes cast / turnout		83,771	50.74	
Registered voters		165,107		
Source: Ministry of the Interior

Candidate	Party	Coalition	First round	
Candidate	Party	Coalition	Votes	%
Sergio Giordani	Ind	PD-SI-EV-M5S-IV-A	47,777	58.44
Francesco Peghin	Ind	L-FI-FdI-UDC-PdF-CI	27,405	33.52
Paolo Girotto	3V		1,655	2.02
Luca Lendaro	Ind	PRC-PaP	1,315	1.61
Others			3,597	4.40
Eligible voters			165,107	100.00
Voted			83,771	50.74
Blank or invalid ballots			2,019	
Total valid votes			81,749	

== Deputy Mayor ==
The office of the deputy mayor of Padua was officially created in 1995 with the adoption of the new local administration law. The deputy mayor is nominated and eventually dismissed by the mayor. Here is a list of deputy mayors of Padua:

	Deputy	Term start	Term end	Party	Mayor
1	Luigi Mariani	16 May 1995	27 June 1999	PPI	Zanonato
2	Domenico Menorello	20 July 1999	17 July 2001 (Note: Dismissed by the Mayor.)	FI	Mistrello Destro
3	Ermanno Ancona	17 July 2001	14 June 2004	Ind	Mistrello Destro
4	Claudio Sinigalia	3 July 2004	23 June 2009	PD	Zanonato
5	Ivo Rossi	10 July 2009	10 June 2014	PD	Zanonato
6	Eleonora Mosco	16 June 2014	12 November 2016	FI	Bitonci
7	Arturo Lorenzoni	10 July 2017	14 July 2020 (Note: Resigned in order to participate in the regional election.)	Ind	Giordani
8	Andrea Micalizzi	14 July 2020	14 June 2022	PD	Giordani
8	Andrea Micalizzi	24 June 2022	13 December 2025 (Note: Resigned after being elected regional councillor.)	PD	Giordani
9	Antonio Bressa	13 December 2025	Incumbent	PD	Giordani
