= Gian Carlo Muzzarelli =

Italian politician

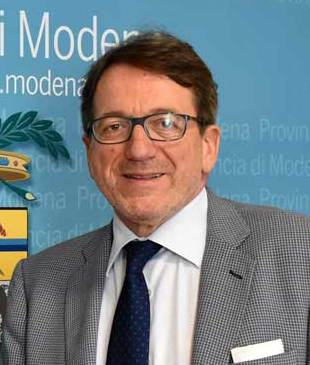

Mayor of Modena
- In office 10 June 2014 – 12 June 2024
- Preceded by: Giorgio Pighi
- Succeeded by: Massimo Mezzetti

President of the Province of Modena
- In office 6 October 2014 – 31 October 2018
- Preceded by: Emilio Sabattini
- Succeeded by: Gian Domenico Tomei

Personal details
- Born: 22 June 1955 (age 71) Modena, Emilia-Romagna, Italy
- Party: Democratic Party
- Profession: Employee

Gian Carlo Muzzarelli (born 22 June 1955) is an Italian politician.

He is a member of the Democratic Party and he served as president of the Province of Modena from 2014 to 2018. He was elected mayor of Modena on 8 June 2014 and took office on 10 June. He has been re-elected for a second term in 2019.

== See also ==
- 2014 Italian local elections
- 2019 Italian local elections
- List of mayors of Modena

Political offices
Preceded by Giorgio Pighi	Mayor of Modena; 2014-2024	Succeeded by Massimo Mezzetti
Preceded by Emilio Sabattini	President of the Province of Modena; 2014-2018	Succeeded by Gian Domenico Tomei
