= Massimo Bitonci =

Italian Venetist politician (born 1965)

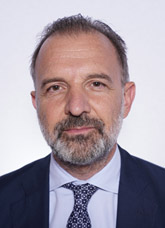

Member of the Chamber of Deputies
- In office 23 March 2018 – 28 December 2025
- Constituency: Veneto
- In office 29 April 2008 – 14 March 2013
- Constituency: Veneto

Mayor of Padua
- In office 10 June 2014 – 12 November 2016
- Preceded by: Flavio Zanonato
- Succeeded by: Sergio Giordani

Member of the Senate of the Republic
- In office 15 March 2013 – 2 July 2014
- Constituency: Veneto

Mayor of Cittadella
- In office 11 June 2002 – 7 May 2012
- Preceded by: Lucio Facco
- Succeeded by: Giuseppe Pan

Personal details
- Born: 24 June 1965 (age 61) Padua, Italy
- Party: Lega (since 2020)
- Other political affiliations: LN (1993–1998, 2005–2020); LVR (1998–2005)
- Education: Ca' Foscari University of Venice

Massimo Bitonci (born 24 June 1965) is an Italian Venetist politician. Born in Padua, he is a member of Liga Veneta–Lega Nord, of which he served as national president since 2016. In 1993, he joined Lega Nord and was deputy mayor of Cittadella from 1994 to 2002. During his second term, he followed mayor Lucio Facco into Liga Veneta Repubblica (LVR). With the support of LVR, he ran for mayor in 2002 and was elected with 50.9% of the vote in a run-off, defeating Liga Veneta in one of its traditional strongholds.

In 2007, Bitonci was re-elected mayor with the 56.5% of the vote in the first round. In that occasion, he was supported by a regionalist front composed of Liga Veneta, LVR, and some civic lists, which won altogether 51.7% of the vote. In the 2008 Italian general election in Veneto, Bitonci was elected to the Chamber of Deputies, where he sat in the parliamentary group of Lega Nord. He trailed the electoral result of the party in the Province of Padua, where Lega Nord passed from 7.7% to 24.1%in two years, and especially in Cittadella, where the party quadrupled its score from 11.6% to 42.2%.

In the 2013 Italian general election in Veneto, Bitonci was elected to the Senate of the Republic, where he was appointed floor leader of his party. In June 2014, Bitonci was elected mayor of Padua (31.4% in the first round, 53.5% in the run-off). In November 2016, having lost the support of the majority of the municipal council, he was dismissed as mayor and the council was subsequently dissolved. In June 2017, Bitonci came first in the first round of the municipal election with 40.3% but was defeated by Sergio Giordani, a left-leaning independent, 48.2% to 51.8% in the runoff.

After the 2025 Venetian regional election and the victory of the center-right coalition led by Alberto Stefani, Bitonci becomes Minister of Economic Development, Research & Innovation and Investment Attraction in the Stefani government.
