= List of mayors of Modena =

Mayor of Modena
- Sindaco di Modena

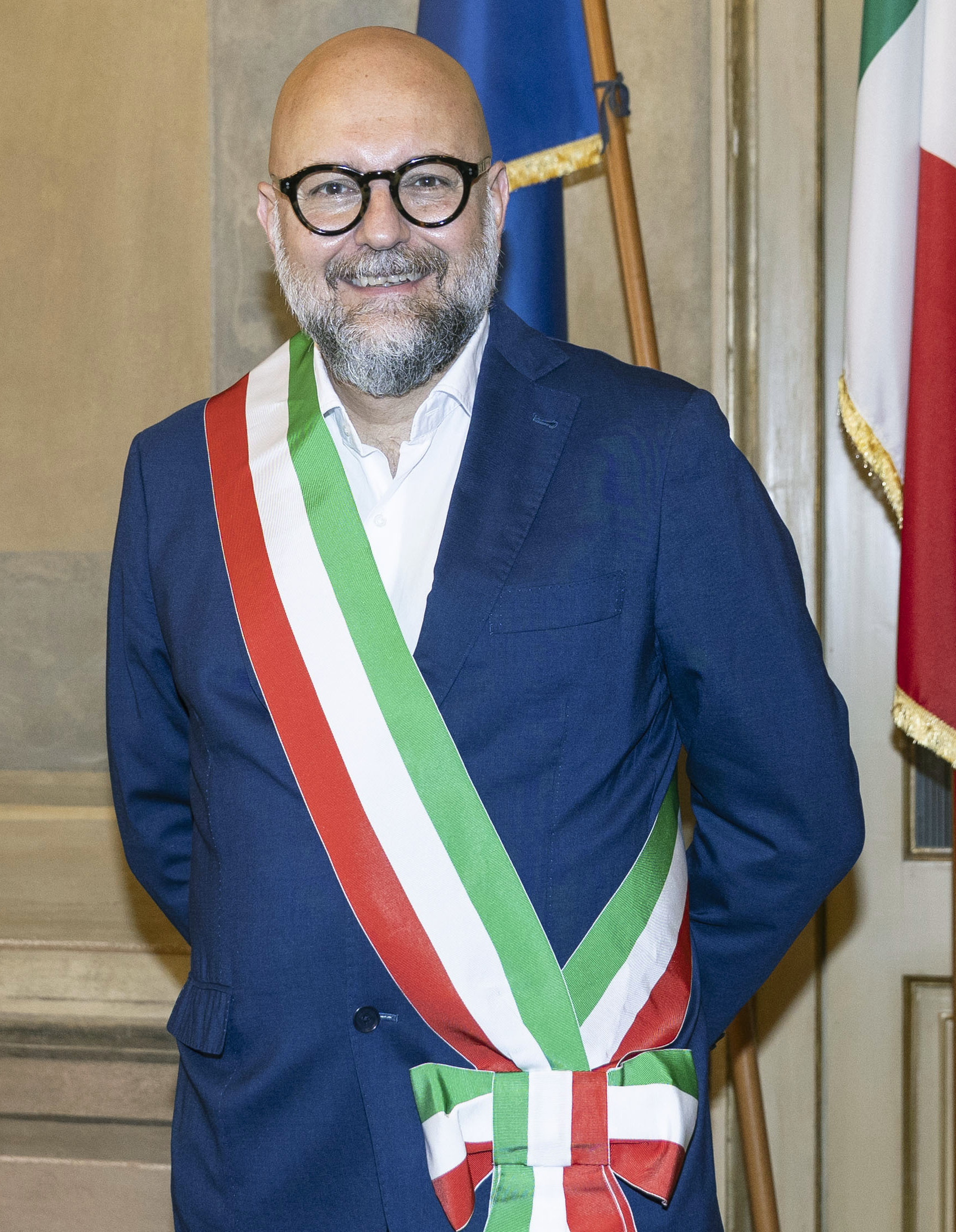
- Incumbent; Massimo Mezzetti since 12 June 2024
- Appointer: Popular election
- Term length: 5 years, renewable once
- Formation: 1859
- Website: Official website

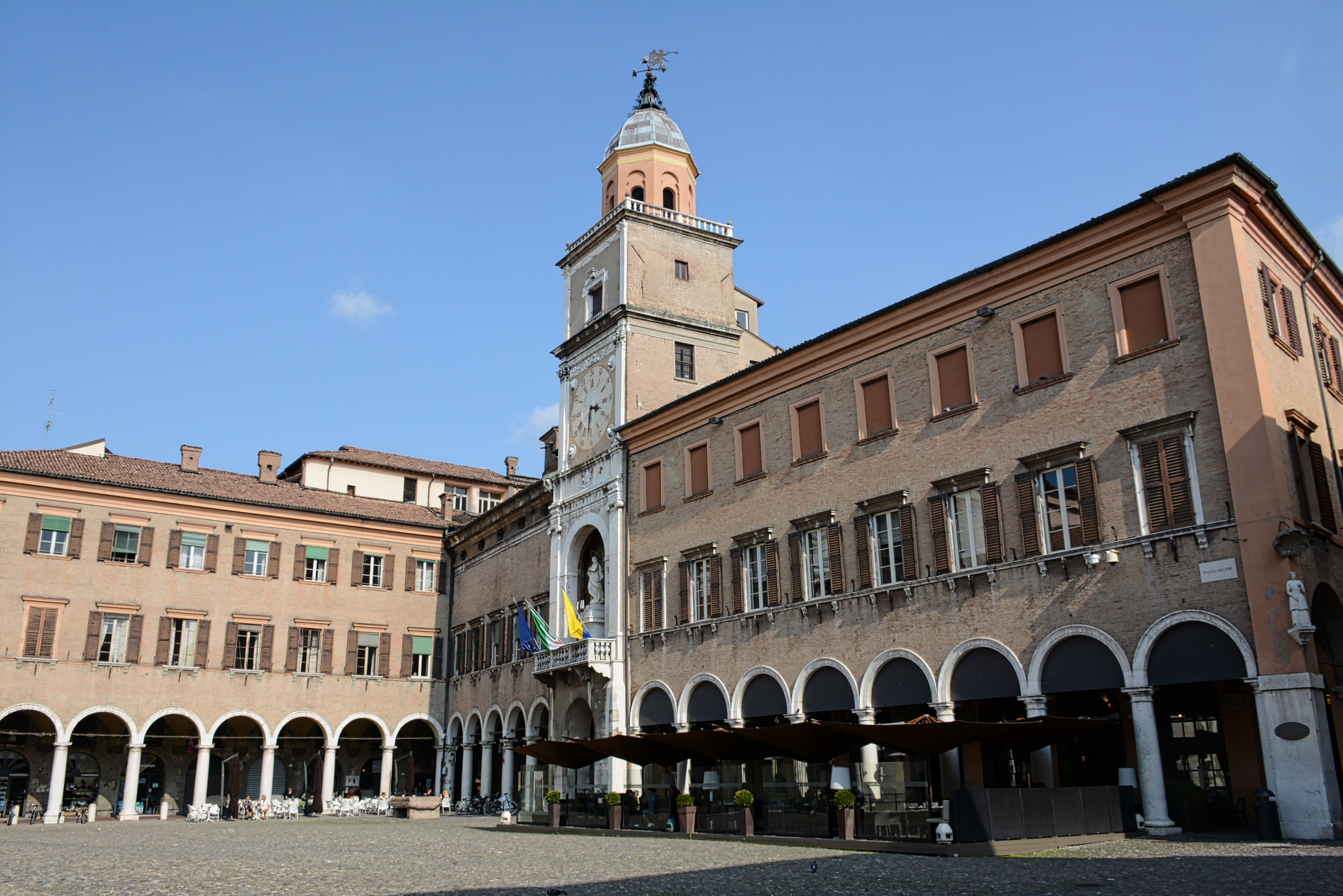
Modena's City Hall

The mayor of Modena is an elected politician who, along with the Modena's city council, is accountable for the strategic government of Modena in Emilia-Romagna, Italy.

The current mayor is Massimo Mezzetti, a center-left independent, who took office on 12 June 2024.

== Overview ==
According to the Italian Constitution, the mayor of Modena is member of the city council. The mayor is elected by the population of Modena, who also elect the members of the city council, controlling the mayor's policy guidelines and is able to enforce his resignation by a motion of no confidence. The mayor is entitled to appoint and release the members of his government.

Since 1995 the mayor is elected directly by Modena's electorate: in all mayoral elections in Italy in cities with a population higher than 15,000 the voters express a direct choice for the mayor or an indirect choice voting for the party of the candidate's coalition. If no candidate receives at least 50% of the votes, the top two candidates go to a second round after two weeks. The election of the City Council is based on a direct choice for the candidate with a preference vote: the candidate with the majority of the preferences is elected. The number of the seats for each party is determined proportionally.

== Republic of Italy (since 1946) ==
=== City Council election (1946–1995) ===
From 1946 to 1995, the Mayor of Modena was elected by the City Council.

	Mayor	Term start	Term end	Party
1	Alfeo Corassori (1903–1965)	22 April 1946	17 March 1962	PCI
2	Rubes Triva (1921–2001)	17 March 1962	16 April 1972	PCI
3	Germano Bulgarelli (1932–2014)	16 April 1972	9 June 1980	PCI
4	Mario Del Monte (1941–1994)	9 June 1980	13 April 1987	PCI
5	Alfonsina Rinaldi (b. 1947)	13 April 1987	2 January 1992	PCI
6	Pier Camillo Beccaria (1945–1994)	2 January 1992	1 September 1994	PDS
7	Mariangela Bastico (b. 1951)	1 September 1994	24 April 1995	PDS

=== Popular election (since 1995) ===
Since 1995, under provisions of new local administration law, the Mayor of Modena is chosen by popular election, originally every four and since 1999 every five years.

	Mayor	Term start	Term end	Party	Coalition	Election
8	Giuliano Barbolini (b. 1945)	24 April 1995	14 June 1999	PDS; DS	The Olive Tree (PDS-PPI-FdV-AD)	1995
8	Giuliano Barbolini (b. 1945)	14 June 1999	14 June 2004	PDS; DS	The Olive Tree (DS-PPI-Dem)	1999
9	Giorgio Pighi (b. 1949)	14 June 2004	12 June 2009	DS; PD	The Olive Tree (DS-DL-PRC)	2004
9	Giorgio Pighi (b. 1949)	12 June 2009	10 June 2014	DS; PD	PD • SEL	2009
10	Gian Carlo Muzzarelli (b. 1955)	10 June 2014	30 May 2019	PD	PD • SEL	2014
10	Gian Carlo Muzzarelli (b. 1955)	30 May 2019	12 June 2024	PD	PD • MDP • EV	2019
11	Massimo Mezzetti (b. 1962)	12 June 2024	Incumbent	Ind	PD • AVS • M5S	2024

== See also ==
- Timeline of Modena
