= Vittorio Casarin =

Italian politician

Vittorio Casarin (born 17 September 1950 in Santa Giustina in Colle) is an Italian politician from Veneto.

A member of Christian Democracy since the 1970s, he was Mayor of Santa Giustina from 1985 to 1995. In 1994 he joined the United Christian Democrats and was elected to the Regional Council of Veneto in 1995. In 1999 he was elected President of the Province of Padua for Forza Italia (party which he had joined in 1998) and was re-elected in 2004. Since 2009 he no longer holds a public office and is a simple member of The People of Freedom.
