= Padanian Parliament =

Political body set up by Lega Nord

Padanian Parliament Parlamento della Padania

Type
- Type: Unicameral

History
- Disbanded: 2018

Leadership
- President of the Assembly: Roberto Calderoli, Independent (Lega Nord) since 2011

Structure
- Seats: 210
- Political groups: Padanian Socialists – Labour and Society (52); Liberal Democrats – Forward Padania (50); Padanian Right – European Alliance (27); Padanian Catholics (20); Padanian Lions (14); Liberal and libertarian Padania (12); Padanian Communists (5); Nation Lombardy (5)

Elections
- Voting system: Party-list proportional representation

Meeting place
- Mantua (1997–2007); Vicenza (2007–2012); Villa Da Porto (since 2012)

Website
- Parlamento della Padania

The Padanian Parliament was a political advisory body established by Lega Nord to represent the proposed independent state, and area of Italy, known as Padania. Previously known as the Northern Parliament and the Parliament House of Mantua, it includes all administrators, regional councilors, mayors, and elected members of Parliament from various local and national administrations. The first official headquarters for the plenary meetings of the newly established Po Parliament was at Villa Riva Berni in Bagnolo San Vito. The second set of meetings, held from 2007 to 2011, took place in Vicenza at Villa Bonin Maistrello, Via dell'Oreficeria 21.

The Padanian Parliament is internally divided into competing political forces, including communists, socialists, liberals, Christian democrats, and national conservatives, all united by a belief in Padanian nationalism. The 1997 election also featured candidates from the Pannella List, led by Benedetto Della Vedova, who was elected to the assembly.

At the gazebo of Lega Nord, representatives of the parties and the Prime Minister of Padania are elected every five years. In chronological order, from 1996 onwards, the Prime Ministers were Giancarlo Pagliarini, Vito Gnutti, Manuela Dal Lago, Mario Borghezio, Francesco Speroni, and Roberto Maroni. On 10 February 2007, at the request of Umberto Bossi, the founder of Lega Nord and its then federal secretary, the Padanian Parliament reconvened in Vicenza at Villa Bonin Maistrello. Following Silvio Berlusconi's resignation and the end of the fourth Berlusconi government, Bossi decided to reopen the Padanian Parliament on 14 November 2011.

On 4 December 2011, Roberto Calderoli was appointed as the new president of the Padanian Parliament during the assembly's opening. This assembly marked the first participation of twenty Umbrian militants led by Gianluca Cirignoni, then Lega Nord deputy leader at the Legislative Assembly of Umbria. By 2012, the Parliament had an office at La Favorita in Monticello di Fara di Sarego, in the province of Vicenza.

== Organs ==
=== President of the Parliament ===
- 1997–2001, Francesco Speroni (Liberal Democrats – Forward Padania)
- 2001–2007, closed/vacant
- 2007–2011, Roberto Maroni (European Democrats – Padanian Labour)
- 2011–2018, Roberto Calderoli (independent)

=== Prime Minister of Padania ===
- 1996–1998, Giancarlo Pagliarini (Liberal Democrats – Forward Padania)
- 1998–1999, Vito Gnutti (Liberal Democrats – Forward Padania)
- 1999–2004, Manuela Dal Lago (Liberal independent)
- 2004–2009, Mario Borghezio (Padanian Right – European Alliance)
- 2009–2012, Francesco Speroni (Liberal Democrats – Forward Padania)
- 2012–?, Roberto Maroni (Padanian Socialists – Labour and Society)

== Internal political parties of Lega Nord ==
=== Left-wing ===
- Padanian Communists, formerly led by Matteo Salvini

=== Centre-left ===
- Padanian Socialists – Labour and Society, formerly led by Roberto Maroni

=== Centre ===
- Padanian Catholics, formerly led by Giuseppe Leoni

=== Centre-right ===
- Liberal and libertarian Padania, formerly led by Marco Pottino
- Liberal Democrats – Forward Padania, formerly led by Roberto Cota

=== Right-wing ===
Padanian Right – European Alliance, formerly led by Enzo Flego

=== Autonomist ===
- Padanian Lions (Liga Veneta), formerly led by Flavio Tosi
- Nation Lombardy (Lega Lombarda), formerly led by Matteo Salvini

== See also ==
- Padanian Declaration of Independence
