= First Berlusconi government =

51st government of the Italian Republic

- 51st Cabinet of Italy

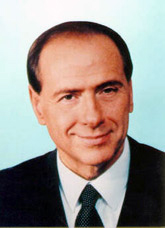
- Date formed: 10 May 1994
- Date dissolved: 17 January 1995 (253 days)

People and organisations
- Head of state: Oscar Luigi Scalfaro
- Head of government: Silvio Berlusconi
- Deputy head of government: Roberto Maroni; Giuseppe Tatarella
- No. of ministers: 26 (incl. Prime Minister)
- Member parties: FI, AN, LN, CCD, UdC, FLD
- Status in legislature: Centre-right coalition
- Opposition parties: PDS, PPI, PRC, PS, FdV, AD, PSI, LR

History
- Election: 1994 election
- Legislature term: XII Legislature (1994–1996)
- Predecessor: Ciampi government
- Successor: Dini government

The first Berlusconi government was the 51st government of the Italian Republic.

It was the first right-wing and non-Christian Democrats government since World War II.

Berlusconi resigned on 22 December 1994.

== History ==
In order to win the March 1994 general election Berlusconi formed two electoral alliances: Pole of Freedoms with the Northern League in northern Italian districts, and another, the Pole of Good Government, with the post-fascist National Alliance (Italy) in central and southern regions. He did not ally with the latter in the North because the League disliked them. As a result, Forza Italia was allied with two parties that were not allied with each other.

Berlusconi launched a massive campaign of electoral advertisements on his three TV networks. He subsequently won the elections, with Forza Italia garnering 21% of the popular vote, the highest percentage of any single party. One of the most significant promises that he made in order to secure victory was that his government would create "one million more jobs". He was appointed prime minister in 1994, but his term in office was short because of the inherent contradictions in his coalition: the Northern League, a regional party with a strong electoral base in northern Italy, was at that time fluctuating between federalist and separatist positions, and National Alliance was a nationalist party that had yet to renounce neo-fascism at the time. In December 1994, following the communication of a new investigation from Milan magistrates that was leaked to the press, Umberto Bossi, leader of the Northern League, left the coalition claiming that the electoral pact had not been respected, forcing Berlusconi to resign from office and shifting the majority's weight to the centre-left side. The Northern League also resented the fact that many of its MPs had switched to Forza Italia, allegedly lured by promises of more prestigious portfolios. In 1998 various articles attacking Berlusconi were published by Northern League's official newspaper (La Padania), with titles such as ""Fininvest (Berlusconi's principal company) was founded by Cosa Nostra".

Berlusconi remained prime minister for a little over a month until his replacement by a technocratic government headed by Lamberto Dini. Dini had been a key minister in the Berlusconi government, and Berlusconi said the only way he would support a technocratic government would be if Dini headed it. In the end, however, Dini was only supported by most opposition parties and by the Northern League but not by the centre-right coalition.

== Investiture vote ==
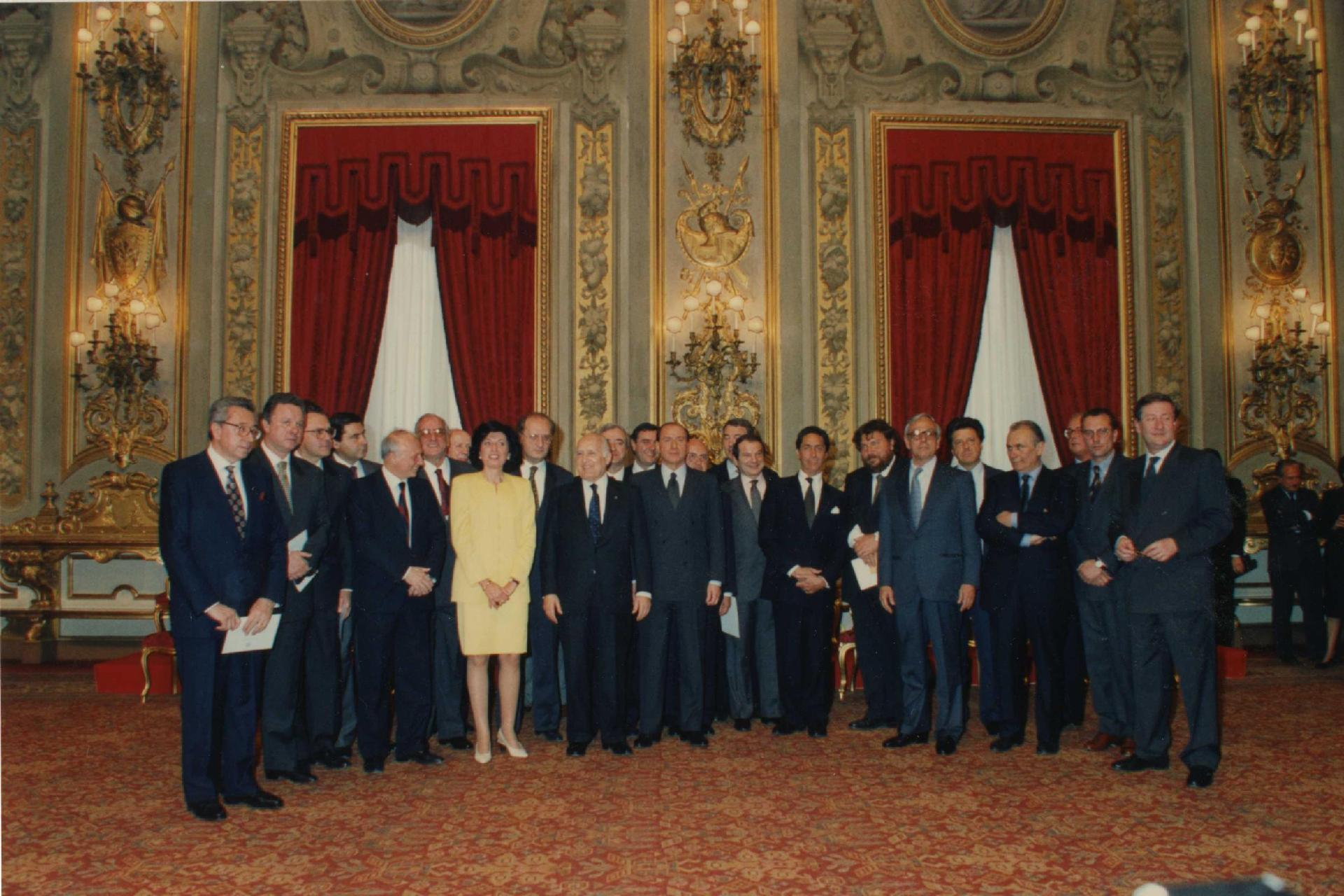
Official photo of the Berlusconi's government after the oath at the Quirinal Palace

18–20 May 1994 Investiture votes for the first Berlusconi government
| House of Parliament | Vote | Parties | Votes |
|---|---|---|---|
| Senate of the Republic | Yes | LN, AN, FI, CCD, Others | 159 / 314 |
| Senate of the Republic | No | PDS, PPI, PRC, FdV-LR, PSI, SVP | 153 / 314 |
| Senate of the Republic | Abstention | Others | 2 / 314 |
| Chamber of Deputies | Yes | LN, FI, AN, CCD | 366 / 611 |
| Chamber of Deputies | No | PDS, PRC, PPI (33), AD, PSI, PS, SVP-UV, Others | 245 / 611 |
| Chamber of Deputies | Abstention | None | 0 / 611 |

== Party breakdown ==
- Forza Italia (FI): Prime minister, 8 ministers and 12 undersecretaries
- National Alliance (AN): 5 ministers and 12 undersecretaries
- Northern League (LN): 5 ministers and 9 undersecretaries
- Christian Democratic Centre (CCD): 2 ministers and 1 undersecretary
- Union of the Centre (UdC): 2 ministers
- Liberal Democratic Foundation (FLD): 1 minister and 1 undersecretary
- Independents: 2 ministers and 1 undersecretary

== Composition ==
| Portrait | Office | Name | Term | Party | Undersecretaries |
|---|---|---|---|---|---|
| | Prime Minister | Silvio Berlusconi | 10 May 1994 – 17 January 1995 | Forza Italia | Gianni Letta (Ind.) (Note: Secretary of the Council of Ministers.) (Note: Delegated to entertainment, tourism and sport.); Ombretta Fumagalli Carulli (CCD) (Note: Delegated to the Civil Protection.); Luigi Grillo (FLD) (Note: Delegated to urban areas and Rome Capital.) |
| | Deputy Prime Minister | Giuseppe Tatarella | 10 May 1994 – 17 January 1995 | National Alliance | Gianni Letta (Ind.); Ombretta Fumagalli Carulli (CCD); Luigi Grillo (FLD) |
| | Deputy Prime Minister | Roberto Maroni | 10 May 1994 – 17 January 1995 | Northern League | Gianni Letta (Ind.); Ombretta Fumagalli Carulli (CCD); Luigi Grillo (FLD) |
| | Minister of Foreign Affairs | Antonio Martino | 10 May 1994 – 17 January 1995 | Forza Italia | Livio Caputo (FI); Franco Rocchetta (LN); Vincenzo Trantino (AN) |
| | Minister of the Interior | Roberto Maroni | 10 May 1994 – 17 January 1995 | Northern League | Maurizio Gasparri (AN); Marianna Li Calzi (FI); Domenico Lo Jucco (FI) |
| | Minister of Grace and Justice | Alfredo Biondi | 10 May 1994 – 17 January 1995 | Union of the Centre | Gian Franco Anedda (AN); Mario Borghezio (LN); Domenico Contestabile (FI) |
| | Minister of Budget and Economic Planning | Giancarlo Pagliarini | 10 May 1994 – 17 January 1995 | Northern League | Ilario Floresta (FI); Antonio Parlato (AN) |
| | Minister of Finance | Giulio Tremonti | 10 May 1994 – 17 January 1995 | Liberal Democratic Foundation | Roberto Asquini (LN); Filippo Berselli (AN); Sandro Trevisanato (FI) |
| | Minister of Treasury | Lamberto Dini | 10 May 1994 – 17 January 1995 | Independent | Marisa Bedoni (LN); Salvatore Cicu (FI); Giovanni Mongiello (CCD); Antonio Rastrelli (AN) |
| | Minister of Defense | Cesare Previti | 10 May 1994 – 17 January 1995 | Forza Italia | Guido Lo Porto (AN); Mauro Polli (LN) |
| | Minister of Public Education | Francesco D'Onofrio | 10 May 1994 – 17 January 1995 | Christian Democratic Centre | Fortunato Aloi (AN); Mariella Mazzetto (LN) |
| | Minister of Public Works | Roberto Maria Radice | 10 May 1994 – 17 January 1995 | Forza Italia | Stefano Aimone Prina (LN); Domenico Nania (AN) |
| | Minister of Agricultural, Food and Forestry Resources | Adriana Poli Bortone | 10 May 1994 – 17 January 1995 | National Alliance | Paolo Scarpa Bonazza Buora (FI) |
| | Minister of Transport and Navigation | Publio Fiori | 10 May 1994 – 17 January 1995 | National Alliance | Sergio Cappelli (LN); Gianfranco Micciché (FI) |
| | Minister of Post and Telecommunications | Giuseppe Tatarella | 10 May 1994 – 17 January 1995 | National Alliance | Antonio Marano (LN) |
| | Minister of Industry, Commerce and Craftsmanship | Vito Gnutti | 10 May 1994 – 17 January 1995 | Northern League | Giampiero Beccaria (FI); Francesco Pontone (AN) |
| | Minister of Health | Raffaele Costa | 10 May 1994 – 17 January 1995 | Union of the Centre | Giulio Conti (AN); Giuseppe Nisticò (FI) |
| | Minister of Foreign Trade | Giorgio Bernini | 10 May 1994 – 17 January 1995 | Forza Italia | |
| | Minister of Labour and Social Security | Clemente Mastella | 10 May 1994 – 17 January 1995 | Christian Democratic Centre | Carmelo Porcu (AN); Adriano Teso (FI) |
| | Minister of Cultural and Environmental Heritage | Domenico Fisichella | 10 May 1994 – 17 January 1995 | National Alliance | |
| | Minister of the Environment | Altero Matteoli | 10 May 1994 – 17 January 1995 | National Alliance | Roberto Lasagna (FI) |
| | Minister of University, Scientific and Technological Research | Stefano Podestà | 10 May 1994 – 17 January 1995 | Forza Italia | Giovanni Meo Zilio (LN) |
| | Minister of Community Policies (without portfolio) | Domenico Comino | 10 May 1994 – 17 January 1995 | Northern League | |
| | Minister of Family and Social Solidarity (without portfolio) | Antonio Guidi | 10 May 1994 – 17 January 1995 | Forza Italia | |
| | Minister of Public Function and Regional Affairs (without portfolio) | Giuliano Urbani | 10 May 1994 – 17 January 1995 | Forza Italia | |
| | Minister of Italians in the World (without portfolio) | Sergio Berlinguer | 10 May 1994 – 17 January 1995 | Independent | |
| | Minister for Parliamentary Relations (without portfolio) | Giuliano Ferrara | 10 May 1994 – 17 January 1995 | Forza Italia | |
| | Minister for Institutional Reforms (without portfolio) | Francesco Speroni | 10 May 1994 – 17 January 1995 | Northern League | |
