= Erminio Boso =

Italian politician (1945–2019)

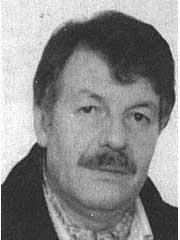
Erminio Boso

Erminio Enzo Boso (9 July 1945 in Pieve Tesino – 10 January 2019 in Pieve Tesino) was an Italian politician.

Also known under the pseudonym of Obelix, for his massive build and stature, he was one of the founders of the Northern League in the province of Trento. He served as a Senator between 1992 and 1996.

In 1997 he was elected to the Padanian Parliament. In 1998 he was elected to the Council of the Autonomous Province of Trento and was then re-elected in 2003.

He was a candidate in the 2004 European Parliament Elections, obtaining around 10,000 personal preferences in the North-Eastern Italy constituency. In June 2008 he was proclaimed an MEP, taking over from Gian Paolo Gobbo, and joined the Independence/Democracy parliamentary group. In May 2013 he attacked Minister Cécile Kyenge, also calling himself "racist", while on July 9 of the same year, intervening in a radio broadcast, he declared that he was happy if a boat of migrants sinks.

In the 2014 European Parliament election, Boso was again a candidate in the North-Eastern Italy constituency. He got around 3,300 preferences, not enough to be elected. During the election campaign, he proposed a new flag for the European Union, based on the Flag of the Confederate States of America.

Boso died on 10 January 2019 at the age of 73 in his hometown, due to a heart attack.
