= Liberal Democratic Foundation =

Liberal Democratic Foundation Fondazione Liberaldemocratica
- Leaders: Giulio Tremonti, Alberto Michelini
- Founded: 28 April 1994
- Dissolved: 1996
- Split from: Segni Pact
- Merged into: Forza Italia
- Headquarters: Rome
- Ideology: Liberalism; Economic liberalism Liberal conservatism
- Political position: Centre-right
- National affiliation: Pole of Freedoms/Pole of Good Government (1994–96)

The Liberal Democratic Foundation (Fondazione Liberaldemocratica, FLD) was a Christian-democratic and liberal Italian political party.

It was founded on 28 April 1994 by splinters from Patto Segni led by Giulio Tremonti (an ex-Socialist) and Alberto Michelini (an ex-Christian-Democrat). They acknowledged the defeat of their party (which won 4.7% of the votes and got elected only 13 deputies in the 1994 general election, in coalition with the Italian People's Party) and, after that they understood that Mario Segni would have led it into an alliance with the left-wing Democratic Party of the Left (that happened for the 1995 regional elections through the Pact of Democrats), they decided to join forces with the centre-right Pole of Freedoms and to support Berlusconi I Cabinet (Tremonti even became Finance Minister).

Some of the members of FLD took part to the foundation of the Federalists and Liberal Democrats group in the Chamber of Deputies along with disgruntled members of Lega Nord on 16 December and, by the 1996 general election, all of them had joined Silvio Berlusconi's Forza Italia.
