= Federico Bricolo =

Italian politician

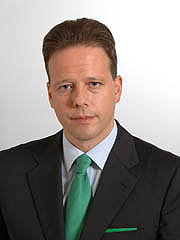

Member of the Senate
- In office 29 April 2008 – 14 March 2013

Member of the Chamber of Deputies
- In office 30 May 2001 – 28 April 2008

Personal details
- Born: 13 July 1966 (age 59) Sommacampagna, Italy
- Party: Lega Nord
- Profession: Politician

Federico Bricolo (born 13 July 1966) is an Italian politician. He is a Venetist and a member of Liga Veneta-Lega Nord.

== Career ==
He has been member of the Chamber of Deputies from 2001 to 2008 and of the Senate from 2008 to 2013.

From 2005 to 2006 he served as Under-Secretary of State for Infrastructure and Transport in the Berlusconi III government. In the XVI legislature (2008–13) he was chairman of Lega Nord parliamentary group.
