= Igor Iezzi =

Italian politician (born 1975)

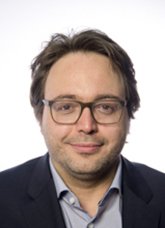
- Iezzi in 2018

Member of the Chamber of Deputies
- Incumbent
- Assumed office 23 March 2018
- Constituency: Lombardy 1 – 08 (2018–2022); Lombardy 1 – 01 (2022–present)

Personal details
- Born: 18 January 1975 (age 51)
- Party: Lega

Igor Giancarlo Iezzi (born 18 January 1975) is an Italian politician serving as a member of the Chamber of Deputies since 2018. He has served as federal commissioner of Lega Nord since 2020.
