= Vito Gnutti =

Italian politician (1939–2008)

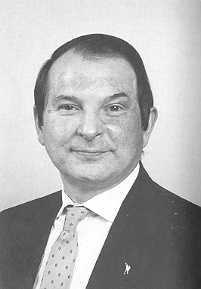

Minister of Industry, Commerce and Craftsmanship
- In office 10 May 1994 – 17 January 1995
- Preceded by: Paolo Savona
- Succeeded by: Alberto Clò

Member of the Senate
- In office 9 May 1996 – 29 May 2001
- Constituency: Lombardy

Member of the Chamber of Deputies
- In office 23 April 1992 – 8 May 1996
- Constituency: XII Lumezzane

Personal details
- Born: 14 September 1939 Lumezzane, Lombardy, Italy
- Died: 6 December 2008 (aged 69) Brescia, Lombardy, Italy
- Party: LN (1991–1999); ApE (2000–2001); DE (2001–2002)
- Profession: Politician, entrepreneur

Vito Gnutti (14 September 1939 – 6 December 2008) was an Italian politician.

== Biography ==
A member of the Executive Committee of Confindustria, in 1991 Gnutti joined the Northern League. He has been MP from 1992 to 2001 and in 1994 he served as Minister of industry, commerce and craftsmanship in the Berlusconi I Cabinet. He held the position of group leader of the Northern League in the Chamber from 1995 to 1996.

In 1999 Gnutti was expelled from the Northern League, so he founded in 2000, along with Domenico Comino, the ApE; he later joined the European Democracy, of which he was president of the parliamentary group.

He died in 2008, after a long illness.
