= Giancarlo Pagliarini =

Italian politician

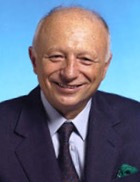

Minister of the Budget
- In office 10 May 1994 – 17 January 1995
- Prime Minister: Silvio Berlusconi
- Preceded by: Luigi Spaventa
- Succeeded by: Rainer Masera

Member of Italian Senate
- In office 23 April 1992 – 9 May 1996

Member of Italian Chamber of Deputies
- In office 9 May 1996 – 27 April 2006

Personal details
- Born: 23 April 1942 (age 84) Milan, Lombardy, Italy
- Party: Lega Nord (1991-2008); The Right (2008-2013); Act to Stop the Decline (2013-present)
- Spouse: Sonia Bekdemiran (1980s-present)
- Children: 2
- Education: Università Cattolica del Sacro Cuore

Giancarlo Pagliarini (born 23 April 1942) is an Italian politician.

Born in Milan, he was later elected to the Italian Senate for Lega Nord in 1992 and re-elected in 1994, then elected to the Chamber of Deputies in 1996 and in 2001. He was Minister of Budget and Economic Planning in the Berlusconi I Cabinet from 1994 to 1995, Lega Nord's Prime Minister of Padania from 1996 to 1998 and floor leader of Lega Nord in the Chamber of Deputies from 1999 to 2001.

He is married to a woman of Armenian origin whose family survived the Armenian genocide, they have a son and a daughter.

Before joining Lega Nord, Pagliarini worked as accountant and was close to the Radical Party, for its battle in favour of divorce. However, he never joined the party, and so he made his first political experience in the League.

Pagliarini is a moderate, sometimes dissenting with the party's social-conservative agenda, a libertarian, especially on economic issues, and a prominent supporter of fiscal federalism and economic liberalism.

He was known as maverick politician and, prior to leaving Lega Nord, often criticized the line imposed by Umberto Bossi. He dissented by continuing the alliance with the other House of Freedoms parties, favouring an autonomous path for Lega Nord, flirted with the independentist wing of the party, led by Gilberto Oneto, a libertarian himself, and maintained relations with the Liberal Reformers.

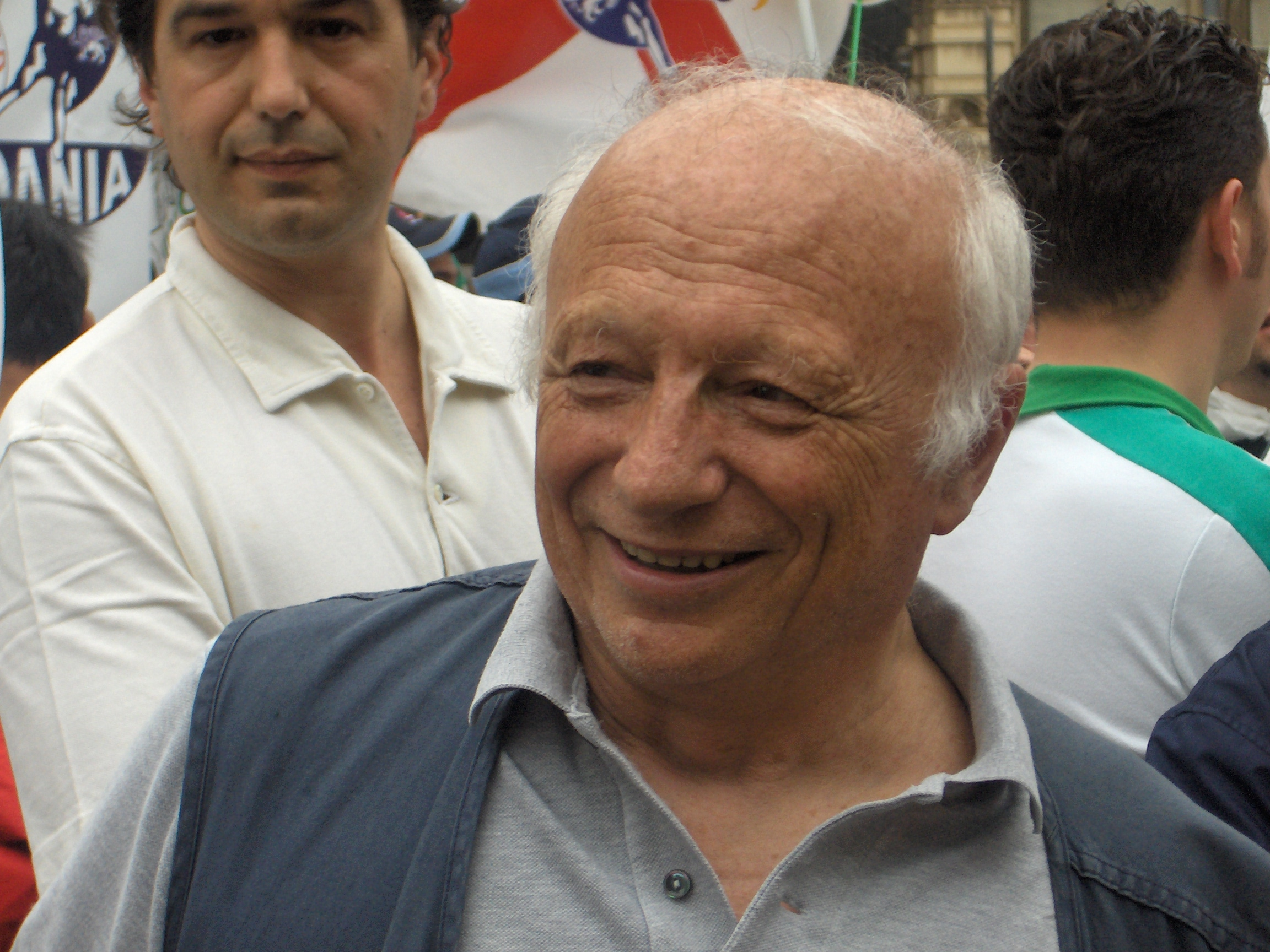
Giancarlo Pagliarini in 2006

On 19 January 2007 Pagliarini, who was not candidate for re-election in the 2006 general election, finally left Lega Nord. In June he took part to the libertarian network founded by Daniele Capezzone.

On 18 January 2008 he unexpectedly joined The Right of Francesco Storace and stood as a candidate in Lombardy in the 2008 general election, despite declaring to have remained "leghista nell'anima e nella mente" (leaguist in the soul and the mind). He was not elected.

He was a candidate for mayor of Milan in the 2011 local elections, but he was not able to enter the runoff election.

Subsequently he joined Act to Stop the Decline, a federalist and liberal party.

Italian Senate
Preceded by Title jointly held	Senator; Legislatures; XI, XII; 1992–1996	Succeeded by Title jointly held
Italian Chamber of Deputies
Preceded by Title jointly held	Deputy; Legislatures; XIII, XIV; 1996 – 2006	Succeeded by Title jointly held
