= Lega Nord =

Political party in Italy

Northern League Lega Nord
- Federal Secretary: Igor Iezzi (commissioner)
- Federal President: vacant
- Founded: 4 December 1989; 36 years ago (alliance); 8 January 1991; 35 years ago (party)
- Merger of: Liga Veneta; Lega Lombarda; Autonomist Piedmont; Ligurian Union; Emilian-Romagna League; Tuscan Alliance
- Headquarters: Via Bellerio, 41 20161 Milan
- Newspaper: la Padania (1997–2014)
- Youth wing: Young Padanians Movement
- Membership (2013): 122,000
- Ideology: Federalism; Regionalism; Conservatism; Populism; Euroscepticism; Historical: Padanian nationalism; Separatism; Autonomism; Liberalism; Libertarianism
- Political position: Right-wing to far-right
- National affiliation: Centre-right coalition (1994 and 2000–present); Lega (since 2020)
- European affiliation: EFA (1989–1994); ELDR (1994–1997); EAF (2013–2014); Patriots.eu (2014–present)
- European Parliament group: ENF (2015–2019); EFD (2009–2014); UEN (2007–2009); I/D (2004–2007); TGI (1999–2001); ELDR (1994–1997); Rainbow (1989–1994)
- Associate party: Lega per Salvini Premier
- Colours: Green
- Anthem: "Va, pensiero"

Website
- leganord.org

Lega Nord (LN; English: Northern League), whose complete name is Lega Nord per l'Indipendenza della Padania (English: Northern League for the Independence of Padania), is a right-wing, federalist, populist and conservative political party in Italy. In the run-up to the 2018 general election, the party was rebranded as Lega (English: League), without changing its official name. The party was nonetheless frequently referred to only as "Lega" even before the rebranding, and informally as the Carroccio (lit. 'big chariot'). The party's latest elected leader was Matteo Salvini.

In 1989, the LN was established as a federation of six regional parties from northern and north-central Italy (Liga Veneta, Lega Lombarda, Piemont Autonomista, Uniun Ligure, Lega Emiliano-Romagnola and Alleanza Toscana), which became the party's founding "national" sections in 1991. The party's founder and long-time federal secretary was Umberto Bossi, later federal president. The LN has advocated the transformation of Italy from a unitary to a federal state, fiscal federalism, regionalism and greater regional autonomy, especially for northern regions. At times, the party has advocated the secession of northern Italy, which the party has referred to as "Padania", and, thus, Padanian nationalism. The party has always opposed illegal immigration and often adopted Eurosceptic stances.

Since 31 January 2020, through a mandate given by the federal council, the party has been managed by commissioner Igor Iezzi. The LN was thus eclipsed by the Lega per Salvini Premier (LSP), until that moment active as the central and southern Italian branch of the party established by Salvini himself in the 2010s, and since 2020 throughout all of Italy. Following the emergence of LSP, the original LN is practically inactive and its former "national" sections (Lega Lombarda, Liga Veneta, etc.) have become "regional" sections of the LSP.

== History ==
=== Precursors and foundation ===
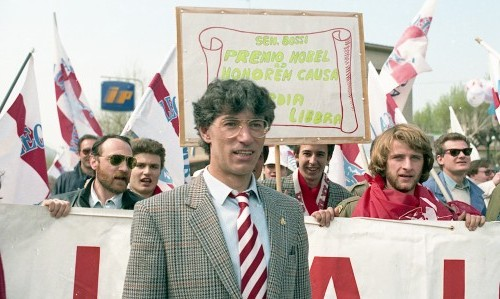
Umberto Bossi at the first rally in Pontida, 1990

At the 1983 general election, Liga Veneta ("Venetian League", based in Veneto) elected a deputy, Achille Tramarin; and a senator, Graziano Girardi. At the 1987 general election, another regional party, Lega Lombarda ("Lombard League", based in Lombardy) gained national prominence when its leader Umberto Bossi was elected to the Italian Senate. The two parties, along with other regionalist outfits, ran as Alleanza Nord ("Northern Alliance") during the 1989 European Parliament election, gaining 1.8% of the vote.

Lega Nord, which was first launched as a reform of Alleanza Nord in December 1989, was officially established as a party in February 1991 through the merger of various regional parties, notably including Lega Lombarda and Liga Veneta. These continue to exist as "national sections" of the main party, which presents itself in regional and local contests as "Lega Lombarda–Lega Nord", "Liga Veneta–Lega Nord", "Lega Nord–Piemont" and so on.

The foundational inspiration for the original regional parties and the unified party was the medieval political alliance of northern Italy known as the Lombard League (1167–1250), the consciousness that the northern ethnicities of the Italian peninsula are descendants of Gaulish and Lombardic populations—historically, northern Italians were called "Lombards" and the entire northern portion of the peninsula was called "Lombardy"—and that they are ethnically different from the Greco-Roman population of the central-southern half of the peninsula ("Italy" proper). The Lega Nord party conveyed resentment against Rome's centralism and the Italian government (epitomised by the popular slogan Roma Ladrona, meaning "Rome the Big Thief"), common in northern Italy as many northerners felt that the government wasted resources collected mostly from northerners' taxes, especially for sustaining the economies of Rome and southern Italy. Resentment against illegal immigrants was also exploited. The party's electoral successes began approximately at a time when public disillusionment with the established political parties was at its height: the Tangentopoli corruption scandals, which involved most of the established parties, broke out from 1992 onwards. Contrary to what many pundits predicted at the beginning of the 1990s, Lega Nord became a stable force in the Italian political scene.

Lega Nord's first electoral breakthrough was at the 1990 regional elections, but it was with the 1992 general election that the party emerged as a leading political actor. Having gained 8.7% of the vote, 56 deputies and 26 senators, it became the fourth largest party of the country and within the Italian Parliament. In 1993, Marco Formentini (a left-wing member of the party) was elected mayor of Milan, the party won 49.3% in the provincial election of Varese and by the end of the year—before Silvio Berlusconi launched his own political career and party—it was estimated around 16–18% in electoral surveys (half of that support was later siphoned by Berlusconi).

=== First alliance with Berlusconi ===
In early 1994, some days before the announcement of the Bossi–Berlusconi pact which led to the formation of the Pole of Freedoms, Roberto Maroni, Bossi's number two, signed an agreement with Mario Segni's centrist Pact for Italy, which was later cancelled.

The party thus fought the 1994 general election in alliance with Berlusconi's Forza Italia (FI) within the Pole of Freedoms coalition. Lega Nord gained just 8.4% of the vote, but thanks to a generous division of candidacies in Northern single-seats constituencies its parliamentary representation was almost doubled to 117 deputies and 56 senators. The position of President Chamber of Deputies was thus given to a LN member, Irene Pivetti, a young woman hailing from the Catholic faction of the party.

After the election, the League joined FI, National Alliance (AN) and the Christian Democratic Centre (CCD) to form a coalition government under Berlusconi and the party obtained five ministries in Berlusconi's first cabinet: Interior for Roberto Maroni (who was also Deputy Prime Minister), Budget for Giancarlo Pagliarini, Industry for Vito Gnutti, European affairs for Domenico Comino and Institutional Reforms for Francesco Speroni. However, the alliance with Berlusconi and the government itself were both short-lived: the latter collapsed before the end of the year, with the League being instrumental in its demise.

The last straw was a proposed pension reform, which would have hurt some of the key constituencies of the LN, but the government was never a cohesive one and relations among coalition partners, especially those between the LN and the centralist AN, were quite tense all the time. When Bossi finally decided to withdraw from the government in December, Maroni vocally disagreed and walked out.

In January 1995, the League gave a vote of confidence to the newly formed cabinet led by Lamberto Dini, along with the Italian People's Party and the Democratic Party of the Left. This caused several splinter groups to leave the party, including the Federalist Party (which was actually founded in June 1994) of Gianfranco Miglio, the Federalists and Liberal Democrats of Franco Rocchetta, Lucio Malan and Furio Gubetti and the Federalist Italian League of Luigi Negri and Sergio Cappelli. All these groups later merged into FI while a few other MPs, including Pierluigi Petrini, floor leader in the Chamber of Deputies, joined the centre-left. By 1996, a total of 40 deputies and 17 senators had left the party while Maroni had instead returned to the party's fold after months of coldness with Bossi.

Between 1995 and 1998, Lega Nord joined centre-left governing coalitions in many local contexts, notably including the Province of Padua to the city of Udine.

=== Padanian separatism ===
After a big success at the 1996 general election, its best result so far (10.1%, 59 deputies and 27 senators), Lega Nord announced that it wanted the secession of northern Italy under the name of Padania. On 13 September 1996, Bossi took an ampoule of water from the springs of the Po River (called Padus in Latin, whence "Padania"), which was poured into the sea of Venice two days later as a symbolic act of birth of the new nation. The Po River was deified by the party (Dio Po, "Po God") and the "Ampoule Rite" was conducted as a yearly Pagan rite by the party's leaders until the 2010s; in its early phase, the party supported a Celtic Druidic form of religion against Roman Catholicism and some party leaders married with Druidic rites. The party gave "Padania", previously referring to the Po Valley, a broader meaning covering entire Northern Italy that has steadily gained currency, at least among its followers. The party even organised a referendum on independence and elections for a Padanian Parliament.

The years between 1996 and 1998 were particularly good for the League, which was the largest party in many provinces of northern Italy and was able to prevail in single-seat constituencies and provincial elections by running alone against both the centre-right and the centre-left. The party also tried to expand its reach through a number of Padanian-styled associations and media endeavours (under the supervision of Davide Caparini), notably including La Padania daily, Il Sole delle Alpi weekly, the Lega Nord Flash periodical, the TelePadania TV channel, the Radio Padania Libera and the Bruno Salvadori publishing house.

However, after the 1996 election, which Lega Nord had fought outside the two big coalitions, the differences between those who supported a new alliance with Berlusconi (Vito Gnutti, Domenico Comino, Fabrizio Comencini and more) and those who preferred to enter Romano Prodi's Olive Tree (Marco Formentini, Irene Pivetti and others) re-emerged. A total of 15 deputies and 9 senators left the party to join either centre-right or centre-left parties. Pivetti left a few months after the election. Comencini left in 1998 to launch Liga Veneta Repubblica with the mid-term goal of joining forces with FI in Veneto. Gnutti and Comino were expelled in 1999 after they had formed local alliances with the centre-right. Formentini also left in 1999 in order to join Prodi's Democrats.

As a result, the party suffered a huge setback at the 1999 European Parliament election in which it garnered a mere 4.5% of the vote. Since then, the League de-emphasised demands for independence in order to rather focus on devolution and federal reform, paving the way for a return to coalition politics.

=== House of Freedoms ===
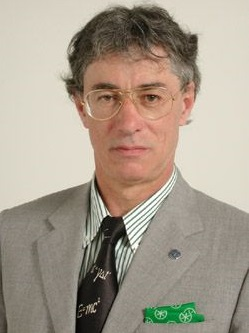
Umberto Bossi, 2001

After the defeat at the 1999 European Parliament election, senior members of the party thought it was not possible to achieve anything if the party continued to stay outside the two big coalitions. Some, including Maroni, who despite 1994–1995 row with Bossi had always been left-leaning in the heart, preferred an alliance with the centre-left. Bossi asked Maroni to negotiate an agreement with Massimo D'Alema, who had described Lega Nord as "a rib of the left". These talks were successful and Maroni was indicated as the joint candidate for President of Lombardy for the 2000 regional election. Despite this, Bossi decided instead to approach Berlusconi, who was the front-runner in the upcoming 2001 general election. The centre-right coalition won the 2000 regional elections and the League entered the regional governments of Lombardy, Veneto, Piedmont and Liguria.

One year later, Lega Nord was part of Berlusconi's House of Freedoms in the 2001 general election. According to its leader, the alliance was a "broad democratic arch, composed of the democratic right, namely AN, the great democratic centre, namely Forza Italia, CCD and CDU, and the democratic left represented by the League, the New PSI, the PRI and, at least I hope so, Cossiga".

The coalition won handily the election, but the LN was further reduced to 3.9% while being returned in Parliament thanks to the victories scored by the League members in single-seat constituencies. In 2001–2006, although severely reduced in its parliamentary representation, the party controlled three key ministries: Justice with Roberto Castelli, Labour and Social affairs with Roberto Maroni and Institutional Reforms and Devolution with Umberto Bossi (replaced by Roberto Calderoli in June 2004). In March 2004, Bossi suffered a stroke that led many to question over the party's survival, but that ultimately confirmed Lega Nord's strength due to a very organised structure and a cohesive set of leaders.

In government, the LN was widely considered the staunchest ally of Berlusconi and formed the so-called "axis of the North" along with FI (whose strongholds included Lombardy and Veneto as well as Sicily) through the special relationship between Bossi, Berlusconi and Giulio Tremonti while AN and the Union of Christian and Centre Democrats (UDC), the party emerged from the merger of the CCD and the CDU in late 2002, became the natural representatives of Southern interests.

During the five years in government with the centre-right, the Parliament passed an important constitutional reform, which included federalism and more powers for the Prime Minister. The alliance that Lega Nord forged with the Movement for Autonomy (MpA) and the Sardinian Action Party (PSd'Az) for the 2006 general election was not successful in convincing Southern voters to approve the reform, which was rejected in the 2006 constitutional referendum.

=== Fourth Berlusconi government ===
In the aftermath of the fall of Romano Prodi's government in January 2008, which led President Giorgio Napolitano to call an early election, the centre-right was re-organised by Berlusconi as The People of Freedom (PdL), now without the support of the UDC. Lega Nord ran the election in coalition with the PdL and the MpA, gaining a stunning 8.3% of the vote (+4.2pp) and obtaining 60 deputies (+37) and 26 senators (+13).

Following this result, since May 2008 the party was represented in Berlusconi's fourth cabinet by four ministers (Roberto Maroni, Interior; Luca Zaia, Agriculture; Umberto Bossi, Reforms and Federalism; and Roberto Calderoli, Legislative simplification) and five under-secretaries (Roberto Castelli, Infrastructures; Michelino Davico, Interior; Daniele Molgora, Economy and Finances; Francesca Martini, Health; and Maurizio Balocchi, Legislative simplification).

In April 2009, a bill introducing a path towards fiscal federalism was approved by the Senate after having passed by the Chamber. The bill gained bipartisan support by Italy of Values, which voted in favour of the measure; and the Democratic Party (PD), which chose not to oppose the measure. As of late March 2011, all the most important decrees of the reform were approved by the Parliament and Bossi publicly praised the Democrats' leader Pier Luigi Bersani for not having opposed the decisive decree on regional and provincial fiscality. Lega Nord influenced the government also on illegal immigration, especially when dealing with immigrants coming from the sea. While the UNCHR and Catholic bishops expressed some concerns over the handling of asylum seekers, Maroni's decision to send back to Libya the boats full of illegal immigrants was praised also by some leading Democrats, notably including Piero Fassino; and it was backed by some 76% of Italians according to a poll.

In agreement with the PdL, Luca Zaia was candidate for President in Veneto and Roberto Cota in Piedmont in the 2010 regional elections while in the other Northern regions, including Lombardy, the League supported candidates of the PdL. Both Zaia and Cota were elected. The party became the largest in Veneto with 35.2% and the second-largest in Lombardy with 26.2% while getting stronger all around the North and in some regions of central Italy.

In November 2011, Berlusconi resigned and was replaced by Mario Monti. The League was the only major party to oppose Monti's technocratic government.

=== From Bossi to Maroni ===
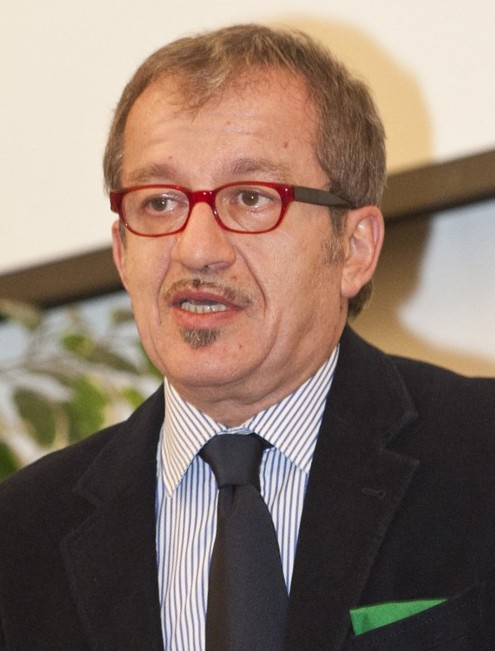
Roberto Maroni, 2010

Throughout 2011, the party was riven in internal disputes, which Bossi's weak-as-ever leadership was not able to stop. Roberto Maroni, a moderate figure who had been the party's number two since the start, was clearly Bossi's most likely successor. The rise of Maroni and his fellow maroniani was obstacled by a group of Bossi's loyalists, whom journalists called the "magic circle". The leaders of this group were Marco Reguzzoni (floor leader in the Chamber of Deputies) and Rosi Mauro.

After being temporarily forbidden from speaking at the party's public meetings, Maroni gained the upper hand in January 2012. During a factional rally in Varese, he launched direct attacks on Reguzzoni and Mauro in the presence of a puzzled Bossi. On that occasion, Maroni called for the celebration of party congresses and closed his speech paraphrasing Scipio Slataper and Che Guevara (the latter being one of his youth's heroes): "We are barbarians, dreaming barbarians. We are realistic, we dream the impossible". On 20 January, Bossi replaced Reguzzoni as leader in the Chamber with Gianpaolo Dozzo. Two days later, the federal council of the party scheduled provincial congresses by April and national (regional) congresses by June. Maroni, whose flock included people as diverse as Flavio Tosi, a conservative liberal; and Matteo Salvini, then a left-winger, strengthened his grip on the party.

On 3 April, a corruption scandal hit the magic circle and consequently the entire party. The party's treasurer Francesco Belsito was charged with money-laundering, embezzlement and fraud of the LN's expenses. Among other things, he was accused of having taken money away from the party's chest and paid it out to Bossi's family and other members of the magic circle, notably including Mauro. Maroni, who had already called for Belsito's resignation as early as in January, asked for his immediate replacement. Belsito resigned a few hours later and was replaced by Stefano Stefani.

More shockingly, on 5 April, Bossi resigned as the federal secretary. The party's federal council then appointed a triumvirate composed of Maroni, Calderoli and Manuela Dal Lago, who would lead the party until a new federal congress was held. Bossi, however, was then elected the federal president. On 12 April, the federal council expelled both Belsito and Mauro and decided that a federal congress would be held at the end of June. In the 6–7 May local elections, the League was crushed almost everywhere while retaining the city of Verona, where Tosi, the incumbent mayor, was re-elected by a landslide; and a few other strongholds.

The Bossi–Belsito scandal finally resulted, on 7 August 2019, in a sentence by Italy's highest court, according to which the LN was to pay back 49 million euros.

=== Leadership of Maroni ===
At the beginning of June, after having secured the leadership of several national sections of the party, Maroni and his followers scored two big victories at the congresses of the two largest "nations", Lombardy and Veneto: Matteo Salvini was elected secretary of Lega Lombarda with 74% of the votes while Flavio Tosi fended off a challenge by the Venetists' and Bossi's loyalists' standard-bearer Massimo Bitonci, defeating him 57%–43%.

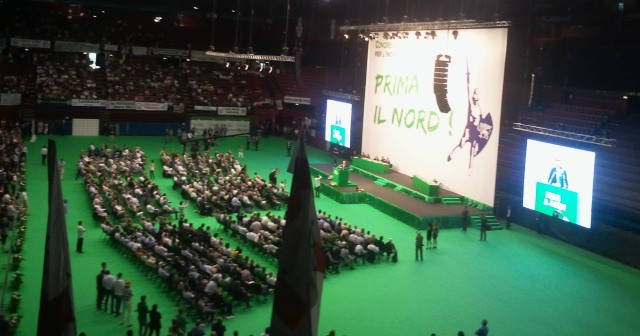
Roberto Maroni speaks at the federal congress in Milan, 1 July 2012.

On 1 July, Maroni was virtually unanimously elected federal secretary. The party's constitution was changed in order to make Bossi federal president for life, to restructure the federal organisation and to give more autonomy to the national sections, in fact transforming the federation into a confederation.

At the 2013 general election, which saw the rise of the Five Star Movement (M5S), the League won a mere 4.1% of the vote (−4.2pp). However, in the simultaneous 2013 regional election in Lombardy the party won the big prize: Maroni was elected President by defeating his Democratic opponent 42.8% to 38.2%. The League, which retrieved 12.9% in Lombardy in the general election, garnered 23.2% (combined result of party list, 13.0% and Maroni's personal list, 10.2%) in the regional election. All three big regions of the North were thus governed by the League.

In September 2013, Maroni announced he would soon leave the party's leadership. A congress was scheduled for mid December and in accordance to the new rules set for the leadership election five candidates filed their bid to become secretary: Umberto Bossi, Matteo Salvini, Giacomo Stucchi, Manes Bernardini and Roberto Stefanazzi. Of these, only Bossi and Salvini gathered the 1,000 necessary signatures by party members to take part to the internal "primary" and Salvini collected four times the signatures gathered by Bossi.

=== Leadership of Salvini ===
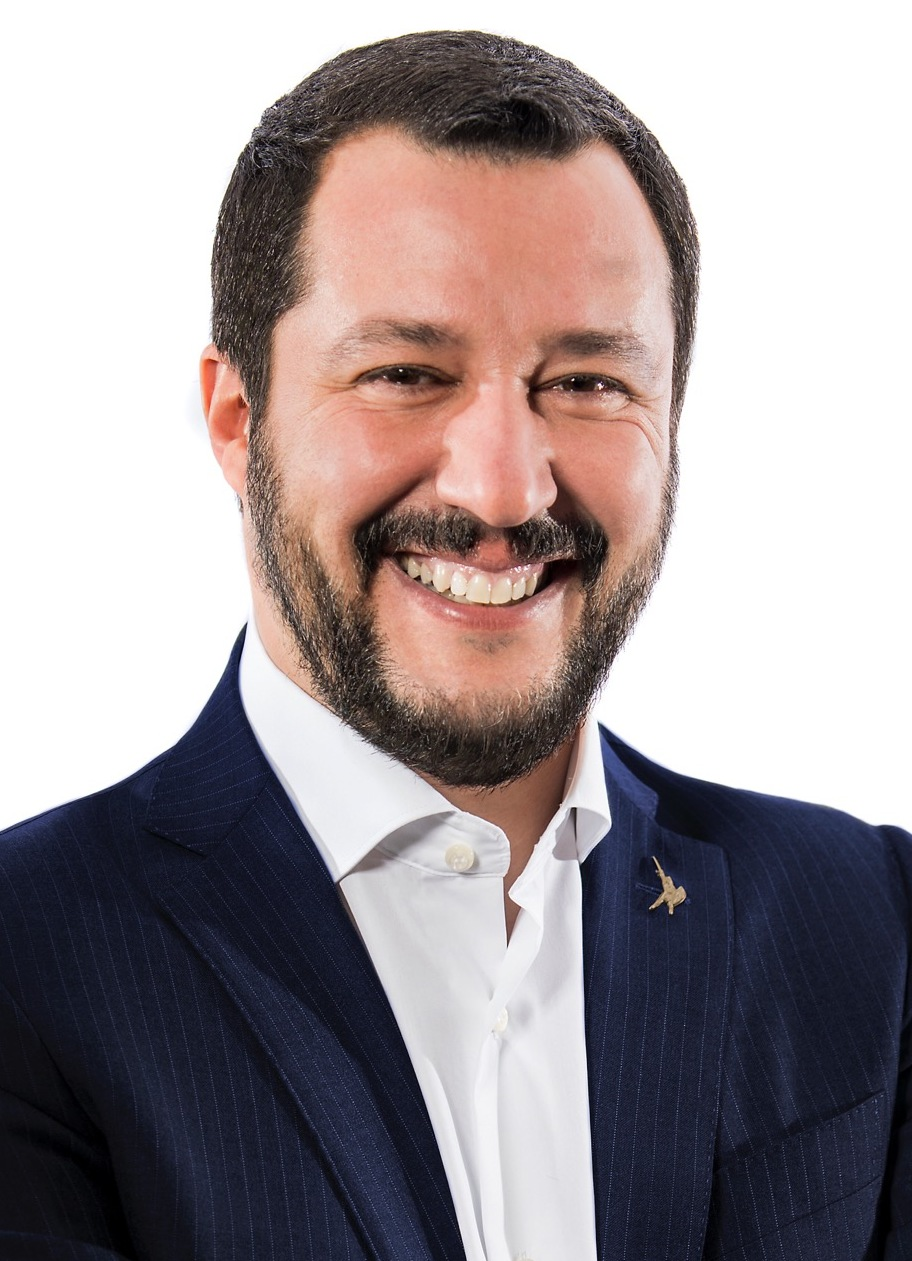
Matteo Salvini, 2018

On 7 December, Salvini, endorsed by Maroni and most leading members (including Tosi, who had renounced a bid of his own), trounced Bossi with 82% of the vote in the "primary". His election was ratified a week later by the party's federal congress in Turin. Under Salvini, the party embraced a very critical view of the European Union, especially of the euro, which he described a "crime against mankind". Ahead of the 2014 European Parliament election, Salvini started to cooperate with Marine Le Pen, leader of the French National Front; and Geert Wilders, leader of the Dutch Party for Freedom. All this was criticised by Bossi, who re-called his left-wing roots; and Tosi, who represented the party's centrist wing and defended the Euro.

In the European election, the party, which ran on a "Stop the Euro" ticket, emphasised Euroscepticism and welcomed candidates from other anti-Euro and/or autonomist movements, notably including South Tyrol's Freiheitlichen, obtained 6.2% of the vote and five MEPs. The result was far worse than that of the previous European election in 2009 (−4.0pp), but better than that of 2013 general election (+2.1pp). The LN came third with 15.2% in Veneto (where Tosi obtained many more votes than Salvini, showing his popular support once for all and proving how the party was far from united on the anti-Euro stance), ahead of the new Forza Italia (FI) and the other PdL's spin-offs; and fourth in Lombardy with 14.6%. Salvini was triumphant, despite the party had lost Piedmont to the Democrats after Cota had been forced to resign due to irregularities committed by one of its supporting lists in filing the slates for the 2010 election and had decided not to stand. Moreover, Bitonci was elected mayor of Padua, a centre-left stronghold.

The party's federal congress, summoned in Padua in July 2014, approved Salvini's political line, especially a plan for the introduction of a flat tax and the creation of a sister party in central-southern Italy and the Isles. In November, the Emilia-Romagna regional election represented a major step for Salvini's "national project": the LN, which won 19.4% of the vote, was the region's second-largest and resulted far ahead of FI, paving the way for a bid for the leadership of the centre-right. In December, Us with Salvini (NcS) was launched. The party's growing popularity among voters was reflected also by a constant rise in opinion polls.

In March 2015, after a long struggle between Tosi and Zaia, who was backed by Salvini, over the party's candidates in the upcoming regional election in Veneto, Tosi was removed from national secretary of Liga Veneta and ejected from the federal party altogether. However, the 2015 regional elections were another success for the LN, especially in Veneto, where Zaia was handily re-elected with 50.1% of the vote (Tosi got 11.9%) and the combined score of party's and Zaia's personal lists was 40.9%. The party also came second in Liguria (22.3%) and Tuscany (16.2%), third in Marche (13.0%) and Umbria (14.0%).

After the 2016 local elections in which the party ran below expectations in Lombardy (while doing well in Veneto—thanks to Zaia, Emilia-Romagna and Tuscany) and the NcS performed badly, Salvini's political line came under pressure from Bossi, Maroni and Paolo Grimoldi, the new leader of Lega Lombarda. In the 2017 leadership election, Salvini, who was focused on becoming the leader of the centre-right and possibly changing the LN's name by ditching the word "North", was re-elected leader of the party with 82.7% of the vote against his opponent Gianni Fava's 17.3%. Consequently, Salvini launched his campaign to become Prime Minister.

In the meantime, the LN campaigned heavily for Veneto's and Lombardy's autonomy referendums, which took place on 22 October. In Veneto, the turnout was 57.2% and those who voted "yes" reached 98.1% whereas in Lombardy the figures were 38.3% and 95.3%. When the referendums were over, with strong opposition by Bossi, Salvini persuaded the party's federal council to style the party simply as "Lega", including NcS, in the upcoming general election. Additionally, Salvini toned down his stances against the European Union and the Euro in order to make an alliance with FI possible.

Despite misgivings by Bossi and the Padanist old guard, the party still had a strong autonomist outlook in the northern regions, especially in Veneto where Venetian nationalism was stronger than ever before. Additionally, the League maintained its power base in the North, where it continued to get most of its support.

=== Yellow-green coalition ===
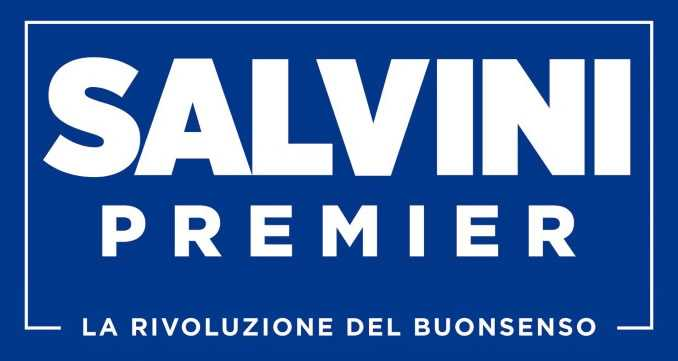
Placard for the 2018 electoral campaign, resembling Donald Trump's one in 2016

The League ran in the 2018 general election within the four-party centre-right coalition, also composed of FI, Brothers of Italy (FdI) and Us with Italy (NcI), which formed a joint list with the Union of the Centre (UdC). In a further effort to broaden its base, the League welcomed in its electoral slates several independents, notably including Giulia Bongiorno and Alberto Bagnai, as well as a wide range of minor parties, including the Sardinian Action Party (PSd'Az), the Italian Liberal Party (PLI) and the National Movement for Sovereignty (MNS). The League obtained a resounding success, becoming the third largest party in Italy with 17.4% of the vote (+13.3pp). The ticket won most of its votes in the North (including 32.2% in Veneto, 28.0% in Lombardy, 26.7% in Trentino, 25.8% in Friuli-Venezia Giulia and 22.6% in Piedmont) while making inroads elsewhere, especially in central Italy (notably 20.2% in Umbria), the upper part of the South (13.8% in Abruzzo) and Sardinia (10.8%).

In the simultaneous regional election in Lombardy, LN's Attilio Fontana ran for President after Maroni, increasingly critical of Salvini, chose not to run for a second term and step aside from politics. Fontana was elected with 49.8% of the vote and the party scored 29.4%. In late April in the regional election in Friuli-Venezia Giulia, LN's Massimiliano Fedriga was elected with 57.1% of the vote and the party scored 34.9%.

As neither of the three main groupings (the centre-right, the PD-led centre-left and the M5S) obtained a majority of seats in Parliament, the League entered in coalition talks with the M5S which was the most voted party with 32.7% of the vote. The talks resulted in the proposal of the so-called "government of change" under the leadership of Giuseppe Conte, a law professor close to the M5S. After some bickering with President Sergio Mattarella, Conte's government, which was dubbed by the media as Western European "first all-populist government", was sworn in on 1 June. The cabinet featured Salvini as Deputy Prime Minister and Minister of the Interior, Giancarlo Giorgetti as Secretary of the Council and four other League members (plus an independent close to the party) as ministers.

During 2019, along with the LN's membership recruitment in the Centre-North, the party launched a parallel drive in the Centre-South for the LSP, practically supplanting NcS. It was a sign that the LSP, whose party constitution had been published in the Gazzetta Ufficiale in December 2017 and had been described as a "parallel party", might eventually replace both the LN and NcS. In the meantime, the parties' joint parliamentary groups were named "League–Salvini Premier" in the Chamber and "League–Salvini Premier–Sardinian Action Party" in the Senate. According to some news sources, Salvini wanted to launch a brand-new party and absorb most of the centre-right parties into it.

Since the government's formation, the party was regularly the country's largest party in opinion polls, at around or over 30%. The party's strength was confirmed in October by the Trentino-Alto Adige/Südtirol provincial elections: in Trentino LN's Maurizio Fugatti was elected President with 46.7% of the vote and the party scored 27.1% (despite competition from several autonomist parties), while in South Tyrol it came third with 11.1% (being the most voted in Bolzano and, more generally, among Italian-speakers), leading it to replace the PD as junior partner of the South Tyrolean People's Party in the provincial government coalition.

In the 2019 European Parliament election in Italy, the League won 34.3% of the vote, winning for the first time a plurality of the electorate, while the M5S stopped at 17.1%. The election thus weakened the M5S and strengthened Salvini's position within the government. At the European level, Salvini worked to create a pan-European alliance of nationalist political parties, the European Alliance of Peoples and Nations, and he continued these efforts after the election through the Identity and Democracy Party. In the election the party performed strongly in its northern strongholds, especially Veneto (49.9%) and Lombardy (43.4%), obtaining as usual most of its votes in small towns, as well as increasing its share of vote all around the country. The party also obtained notable results in some of the places associated with the European migrant crisis, from north to south, such as Bardonecchia, Ventimiglia, Riace and Lampedusa.

In July 2019, a case of attempted Russia-linked corruption by the League was made public by voice recordings acquired by BuzzFeed. The recordings showed Gianluca Savoini, a LN member, meeting with unspecified Russian agents in Moscow, at the same time when Salvini was also in Moscow on an official trip. The meeting centered around providing the party with $65 million of illegal funding by Russia. The matter was made part of a larger investigation by Italian authorities into the League's finances. In February 2019 the Italian magazine L'Espresso had already published an investigation revealing another 3 million euro funding scheme, paid for by Kremlin-linked entities and disguised as a diesel sale. That scheme involved the Russian state-owned oil company Rosneft selling 3 million dollars' worth of diesel to an Italian company. Allegedly, the money was to be transferred from Rosneft to the League through a Russian subsidy of the Italian bank Intesa Sanpaolo, in which LN's federal council member Andrea Mascetti was a board member. The money was supposed to fund the coming European election campaign. Italian authorities are currently investigating the matter. The League was also an official cooperation partner of the Russian governing party United Russia.

On 8 August 2019, Salvini announced his intention to leave the coalition with the Five Stars and called for a snap general election. However, after successful talks between the M5S, and the PD, a new government led by Conte was formed. The League thus returned to opposition, together with its electoral allies of the centre-right coalition.

The first election after the formation of Conte's second government was the 2019 Umbrian regional election. In a traditional stronghold of the centre-left, the League won 37.0% of the vote and its candidate Donatella Tesei was elected President with 57.6% of the vote and a 20% lead over Vincenzo Bianconi, who was the candidate of a joint list of centre-left and M5S.

=== 2019 federal congress ===
During a federal congress on 21 December 2019, the party's constitution underwent some major changes, including reduced powers for the federal president, the extension of the federal secretary's and federal council's terms from three to five years, the introduction of "dual membership" and the faculty given to the federal council to grant the use of the party's symbol to other political movements. With the end of its membership drive in August 2020, the LSP, until then present only in central-southern Italy, became active throughout Italy. The LN, unable to be dissolved because of its burden of €49 million debt to the Italian state, was instead formally kept alive, while its membership cards were donated to former activists.

== Ideology ==
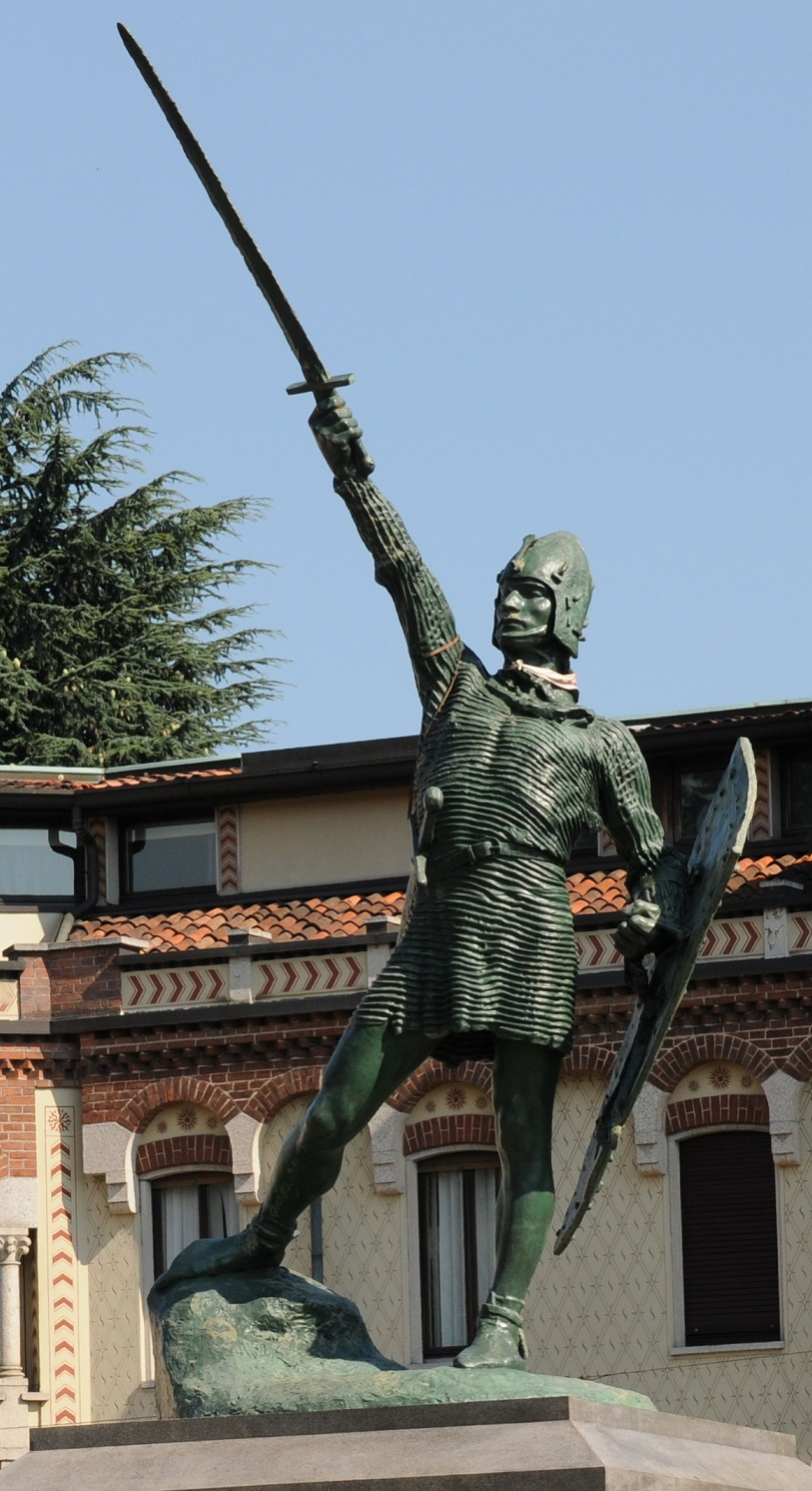
Statue of Alberto da Giussano (Monument to the Warrior of Legnano), the Medieval knight who inspired Umberto Bossi

The party's ideology is a combination of political federalism, fiscal federalism, regionalism and defense of northern Italian traditions. The historical goal of the party is to transform Italy into a federated state, letting Padania keep more tax revenues collected there under a regime of fiscal federalism. Through Lega Nord, federalism has become a major issue in the country. This is also the main difference between the Lega Nord and most European regionalist parties (South Tyrolean People's Party, Basque Nationalist Party, Republican Left of Catalonia, Scottish National Party, Vlaams Belang and the like), which focus on special rights for their own regions.

The original programme of the party identified "federalist libertarianism" as ideology. In fact, the party has often varied its tone and policies, replacing its original libertarianism and social liberalism with a more socially conservative approach, alternating anti-clericalism with a pro-Catholic Church stance and Europeanism with a marked Euroscepticism and ultimately abandoning much of its original pacifism and uncompromising environmentalism. Lega Nord is now often regarded as a right-wing populist party, and has been described as "ethnoregionalist populist" or "radical right populist". Party leaders generally reject the "right-wing" label, though not the "populist" label. In 2008, Umberto Bossi explained in an interview that Lega Nord is "libertarian, but also socialist" and that the right-wing ideology he prefers is an anti-statist one with a "libertarian idea of a state which does not weigh on citizens". When asked to tell his most preferred politician of the 20th century, he said Giacomo Matteotti, a Socialist MP who was killed by Fascist squads in 1925 and remembered his anti-fascist and left-wing roots.

Lega Nord's political culture was a mix of northern Italian pride or even Padanian nationalism, often with claims of a proud Celtic heritage; resentment of perceived southern Italian habits and Roman authorities; distrust of the Republic of Italy and especially its flag; and some support for the free market, anti-statism, anti-globalism and separatism or secessionism. The party boasts historical references to the anti-imperialist Lombard League and Alberto da Giussano (stylised in the party's symbol), the hero of the wars against Frederick I Barbarossa. These historical references are the base for the party's anti-monopolism and anti-centralism.

Lega Nord has long maintained an anti-southern Italian stance. Party members have been known to oppose large-scale southern Italian migration to northern Italian cities, stereotyping southern Italians as welfare abusers, criminals and detrimental to Northern society. Party members have often attributed Italy's economic stagnation and the disparity of the North-South divide in the Italian economy to supposed negative characteristics of the southern Italians, such as lack of education, laziness, or criminality. Some LN members have been known to publicly deploy the offensive slur terrone ("earthling", "mulatto"), a common pejorative term for southern Italians.

At times, it has seemed possible that the League might unite with similar leagues in central and southern Italy, but it has not succeeded in doing so. The party continues dialogue with regionalist parties throughout Italy, notably the South Tyrolean People's Party, the Valdostan Union, the Trentino Tyrolean Autonomist Party, the Movement for the Autonomies and the Sardinian Action Party; and it has some figures from the South in its parliamentary ranks. Notably, Angela Maraventano, former deputy mayor of Lampedusa, was a senator of Lega Nord. Although it is no longer a member of the European Free Alliance, the party has ties with many regionalist parties around Europe, including left-wing parties such as the Republican Left of Catalonia. Lega Nord has some ties also with the Ticino League from Switzerland.

=== Catch-all nature ===
Lega Nord aims at uniting all those northern Italians who support autonomy and federalism for their land. For this reason, it has tended to be a multi-ideological catch-all party, especially at its beginnings, following what Bossi stated in 1982 to his early followers: "It does not matter how old are you, what your job is and what your political tendency: what matters is that you and we are all Lombard. [...] It is as Lombards, indeed, that we have a fundamental common goal in face of which our division in parties should fall behind". Roberto Biorcio, a political scientist, wrote: "The political commitment of Umberto Bossi was influenced by his encounter with Bruno Salvadori, leader of the Valdostan Union [...]. The convictions of Salvadori on federalism, the self-determination of the peoples (the so-called nations without state) and the belonging to a people on the basis of cultural criteria and not on blood, were adopted by the future leader of the League".

Since the beginning the electorate of the party has been very diverse on a left-right scale. At the 1992 general election, for instance, 25.4% of the party supporters were former Christian Democratic voters, 18.5% Communists, 12.5% Socialists and 6.6% former voters of the post-fascist Italian Social Movement. According to a 1996 Abacus poll, 28.7% of LN voters identified as centrist, 26.3% as right-wingers and 22.1% as left-wingers.

It is quite difficult to define it in the left-right spectrum because it is variously conservative, centrist and left-wing with regard to different issues. For example, the party supports both liberal ideas such as deregulation and social-democratic positions such as the defense of workers' wages and pensions. This is because Lega Nord, as a "people's party" representing the North as a whole, includes both liberal-conservative and social-democratic factions. As Lega Nord, the party could be seen as a cross-class entity uniting northern Italians, whether working class or petit bourgeois, around a sense of opposition to both the powerful forces of capital and a centralising state based in Rome which redistributes resources towards southern Italy.

Generally speaking, the party supports the social market economy and other typical issues of Christian-democratic parties and has been described as a "neo-labour party" by some commentators and also by some of its members. Lega Nord is populist in the sense that it is an anti-monopolist and anti-elitist popular and participative party (it is one of the few Italian political parties not to permit freemasons to join), fighting against the "vested interests", once identified by Bossi in "Agnelli, the Pope and the Mafia". The party is also libertarian populist in its promotion of small ownership, small and medium-sized enterprise, small government as opposed to governmental bureaucracy, waste of public funds, pork barrel spending and corruption. These are the main reasons why the party is strong in the North despite being obscured (especially at the beginning of its history) and badly presented by national media, television and newspapers. According to a number of scholars, Lega Nord is an example of a right-wing populist, radical right, or far-right party while some see significant differences to typical European radical right-wing populist parties, or reject the label of radical right as inadequate to describe the party's ideology.

According to many observers, under Matteo Salvini the party lurched to the right, but both Salvini, a former communist; and Luca Zaia insist the party is "neither right nor left" while Roberto Maroni, another former leftist, stated that "we are a big political movement which has in its platform issues and people of right and left".

=== Platform and policies ===
The party usually takes a socially conservative stance on social issues, such as abortion, euthanasia, medical embryonic stem cell research, artificial insemination, same-sex marriage (although there is an association called Los Padania, where "Los" stands for "free sexual orientation", linked to the party and Lega Nord was once in favour of same-sex marriage) and drug use (although it did once support the legalization of marijuana along with Marco Pannella's Radicals). Despite this, the party has been home to some social liberals, namely Giancarlo Pagliarini, Rossana Boldi, Giovanna Bianchi Clerici and to some extent Roberto Castelli.

The party has often espoused criticism of Islam and has styled itself as a defender of "Judeo-Christian values". In 2018 the party made a proposal to make it mandatory for crucifixes to be displayed in all public spaces, including ports, schools, embassies and prisons, with fines of up to €1,000 for failing to comply.

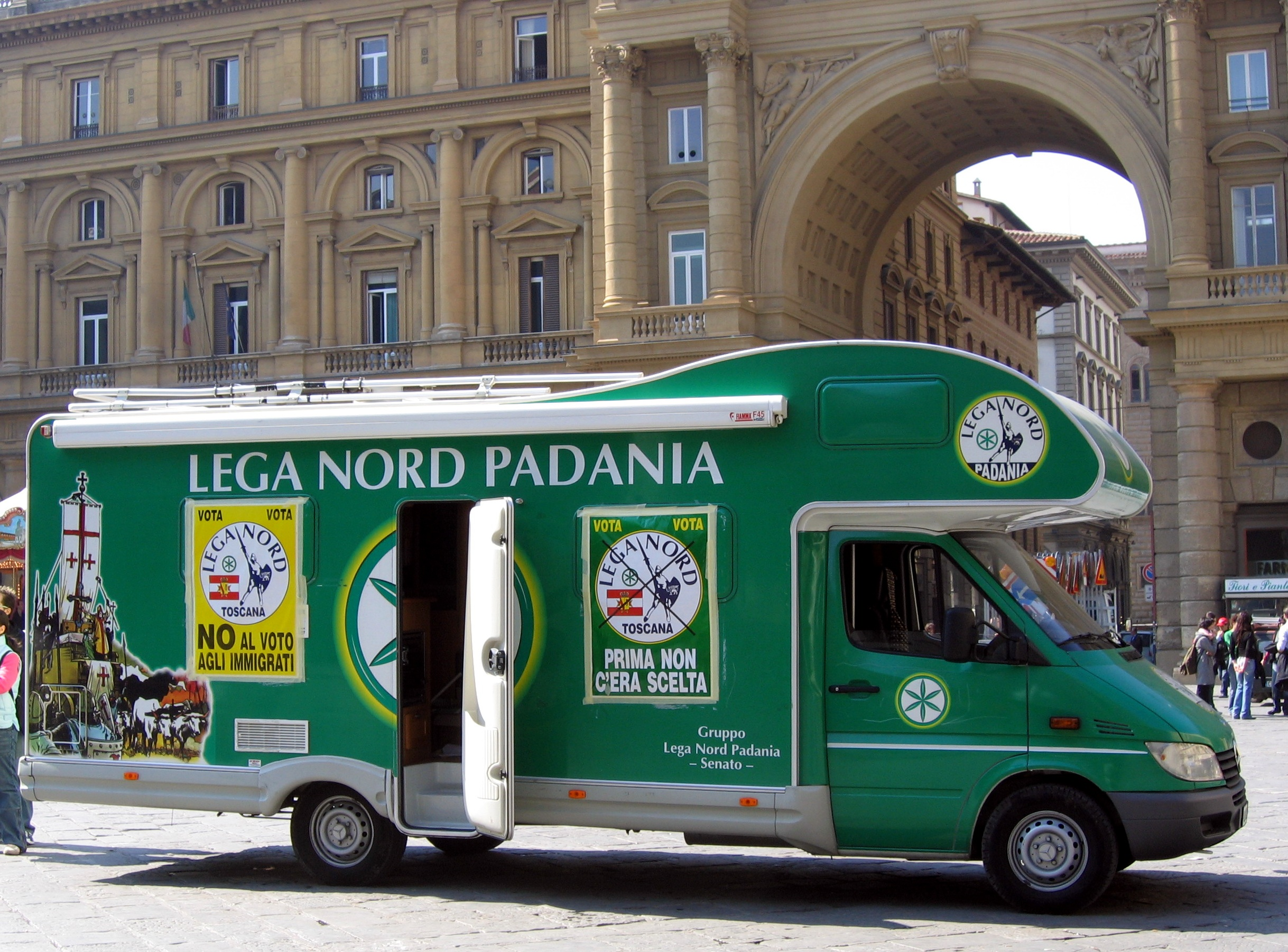
Campervan of Lega Nord for the 2005 Tuscan regional election in Florence

Lega Nord has long opposed statism and supports lower taxes, especially for families and small entrepreneurs, most recently in the form of a 15% flat tax for all. In earlier times, the party campaigned for a stop of the flow of public money in help to big businesses facing crisis as for FIAT and Alitalia. Other key policies include the legalisation, regulation and taxation of prostitution in brothels, the direct election of prosecutors and a regionalised judiciary and Constitutional Court.

In its political programme, the party is committed to the environment, supporting public green areas, the establishment of natural parks, recycling and the end (or regulation) of the construction of sheds in country areas, especially in Veneto. Lega Nord, which has a strong agricultural wing, also supports the protection of traditional food, opposes GMOs and has campaigned for a revision of the quota system of the Common Agricultural Policy.

In foreign policy, the League has never had a particularly pro-United States stance, although it admires the American federal political system. The party's MPs opposed both the Gulf War in 1991 and the NATO intervention in Kosovo in 1999 in the name of pacifism and Bossi personally met Slobodan Milošević during that war. However, after the September 11 attacks and the emergence of Islamic terrorism, the League became a supporter of the American efforts in the war on terror, while expressing several reservations about the Iraq War and the American policy in its aftermath. The League is also a staunch supporter of Israel. In 2011, the party was severely opposed to the Italian participation in the war in Libya while in 2014 it opposed the sanctions on Russia, a key economic partner of Lombard and Venetian entrepreneurs and a likely ally in the fight against Islamic terrorism and the Islamic State of Iraq and the Levant. At times, the party has adopted anti-globalist views.

Through the Associazione Umanitaria Padana, Lega Nord participates in humanitarian projects which are intended to respect local cultures, traditions and identities. The campaigns are carried out in poor countries or in those that have suffered from war or natural catastrophes. Locations of missions include Darfur, Iraq, Afghanistan and Ivory Coast. The association is led by Sara Fumagalli, wife of Roberto Castelli and born-again Catholic after a pilgrimage in Medjugorje.

==== Federalism vs. separatism ====
The Sun of the Alps, the proposed flag for Padania by Lega Nord

The exact program of Lega Nord was not clear in the early years as some opponents claimed it wanted secession of Padania while at other times it appeared to be requesting only autonomy for Northern regions. The League eventually settled on federalism, which rapidly became a buzzword and a popular issue in most Italian political parties.

By 1996, the party switched to open separatism, calling for the independence of Padania. The party's constitution was reformed accordingly and still proclaims at article 1 that the LN's fundamental goal is "the achievement of the independence of Padania, through democratic means, and its international recognition as independent and sovereign federal republic". A voluntary group of militants, the "Green Volunteers", often referred as "green shirts" (green being the colour of Padania), was also established, but it has since been active mainly in civil defense and emergency management. In September 1996 in Venice, the party unilaterally proclaimed the independence of Padania at which time while reading the Padanian Declaration of Independence Bossi announced:

We the peoples of Padania solemnly declare that Padania is an independent and sovereign federal republic. We mutually pledge to each other our lives, our fortunes and our sacred honour.

The renewed alliance with Berlusconi in 2001 forced the party to tone down its separatism and Padania became the name of a proposed "macro-region", based on the ideas of Miglio: the establishment an Italian federal republic, divided into three "macro-regions" ("Padania", "Etruria" and the "South") and some autonomous regions. A new buzzword, devolution (often used in English), was also introduced, but with less success than "federalism". This evolution caused some criticism within party ranks and led to the formation of some minor breakaway groups. Moreover, the peculiarity of the LN among European regionalist parties is that its main goal has long been the transformation of Italy into a federal state instead of simply demanding special rights and autonomy for Northern regions. Despite this, the party's constitution continues to declare that the independence of Padania is one of the party's final goal.

==== Euroscepticism vs. Europeanism ====
Lega Nord often criticises the European Union (it was the only party in the Italian Parliament, along with the Communist Refoundation Party, to vote against the Treaty establishing a Constitution for Europe, but it voted in favour of the Treaty of Lisbon) and opposes what it calls the "European superstate", favoring instead a "Europe of the Regions". Especially under the leadership of Matteo Salvini and the influence of professor Claudio Borghi, the party has proposed the abandonment of the Euro by Italy, although this has been opposed by some party heavyweights, notably including Flavio Tosi. In an October 2012 interview, Salvini said that "I in Milan want [the euro], because here we are in Europe. The South, however, is like Greece and needs another currency, the euro can't afford it."

However, according to Roberto Maroni the party is not Eurosceptic and stands for a "new Europeanism". In a public speech in 2012, he said to party activists: "We should start looking at Padania in a Northern, European perspective. [...] The project of Padania is not anti-European, this is a new Europeanism which looks at the future: a Europe of the regions, a Europe of the peoples, a truly federal Europe". Moreover, under Maroni the party has supported the direct election of the President of the European Commission, more powers for the European Parliament, acceleration of the four unions (political, economic, banking and fiscal), Eurobonds and project bonds, the European Central Bank as lender of last resort and the "centrality of Italy in European politics".

==== Illegal immigration ====
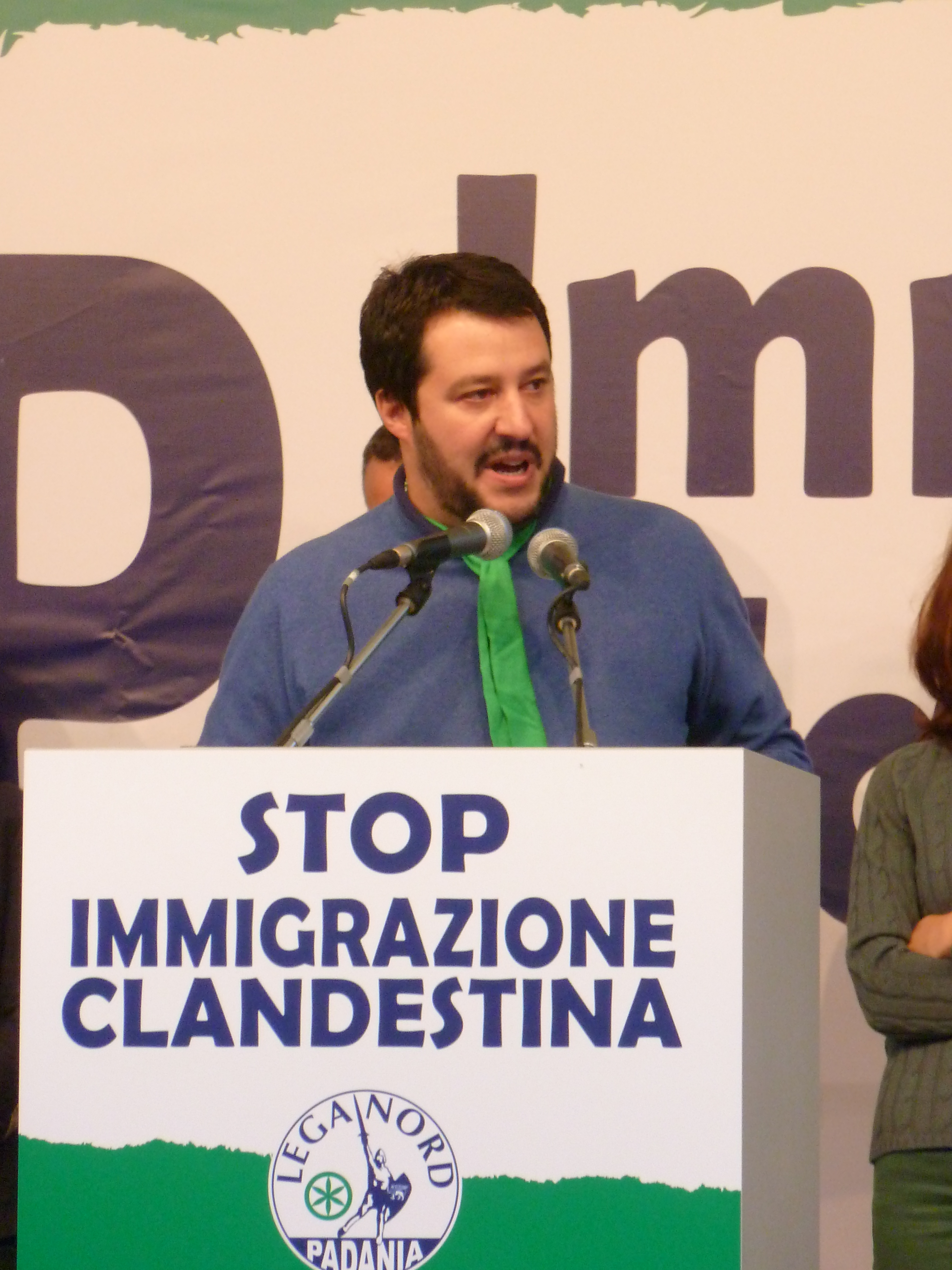
Matteo Salvini speaks in a Lega Nord rally in Turin, 2013.

The party takes a tough stance on crime, illegal immigration, especially from Muslim countries, and terrorism. It supports the promotion of immigration from non-Muslim countries in order to protect the "Christian identity" of Italy and Europe, which according to party officials should be based on "Judeo-Christian heritage". The party has been labeled as "nationalist", "xenophobic" and "anti-immigration". In 1992, the League was compared by Le Nouvel Observateur to some national populist parties of the European far-right, including France's National Front, the Freedom Party of Austria and the Vlaams Blok, claiming that "the League rejects any association with neo-fascists but plays on themes of xenophobia regionalism and trivial racism".

In 2002, the European Commission against Racism and Intolerance (ECRI) denounced the party, saying that "exponents of the Lega Nord [...] have been particularly active in resorting to racist and xenophobic propaganda, although members of other parties have also made use of xenophobic or otherwise intolerant political discourse". In 2006 the ECRI noticed that "some members of the Northern League have intensified the use of racist and xenophobic discourse". While noting that those expressing themselves this way were mostly local representatives, according to the ECRI "representatives exercising important political functions at national level have also resorted to racist and xenophobic discourse. Such discourse has continued to target essentially non-EU immigrants, but also other members of minority groups, such as Roma and Sinti". The ECRI also recalled that "in December 2004, the first instance court of Verona found six local representatives of Lega Nord guilty of incitement to racial hatred in connection with a campaign organised in order to send a group of Sinti away from a local temporary settlement". However, the Court of Cassation cancelled the sentence in 2007.

Although several LN members speak strongly against illegal immigrants (Bossi suggested in 2003 opening fire on the boats of illegal immigrants from Africa, whom he described as bingo-bongos; and Giancarlo Gentilini labeled foreigners as "immigrant slackers", saying that "we should dress them up like hares and bang-bang-bang"), the party's official line is more moderate. In a 2010 interview after some riots in Milan between South American and North African immigrants, Maroni, then Minister of the Interior, stated that "the police state is not the solution" to integration problems and calling for a "new model of integration" maintained that "we should think that, other than a permit of stay, a job and a house, there are further conditions that today are missing for integration to succeed". Bossi endorsed the position.

Lega Nord rejects all charges of xenophobia, instead claiming that the North is the victim of discrimination and racism. After more than fifteen years of government by Lega Nord, the Province of Treviso was widely considered the place in Italy where immigrants are best integrated. Similar things can be said about the city of Verona, governed by Flavio Tosi, who evolved from being a hardliner to be one of the most popular mayors of Italy. Moreover, the first and so far only black mayor in Italy belongs to the League: Sandy Cane (whose mother is Italian and father is an African American) was elected mayor in Viggiù in 2009. In an interview with The Independent, Cane said that the League does not include racist or xenophobic members. She eventually left the League in 2014. More recently, Hajer Fezzani, a Tunisian-born lapsed Muslim, was appointed local coordinator in Malnate; Souad Sbai, president of the association "Moroccan women in Italy" and former deputy of The People of Freedom, joined the party; and most notably Toni Iwobi, a Nigerian-born long-time party member, was appointed at the head of the party's department on immigration ("Tony will do more for legal immigrants in a month than what Kyenge has done in an entire life", Salvini said during the press conference) and became the first person of colour to be elected a senator of Italy after 2018 general election.

=== International affiliation ===
Lega Nord was originally a member of the European Free Alliance (EFA) and its first two MEPs, Francesco Speroni and Luigi Moretti, joined the Rainbow Group in the European Parliament during the fourth parliamentary term (1989–1994). Between 1994 and 1997, it was a member of the group of the European Liberal Democrat and Reform Party (ELDR) and one MEP of Lega Nord, Raimondo Fassa, continued to sit in the ELDR group until 1999. During the sixth parliamentary term (1999–2004), it was briefly a component of the Technical Group of Independents (TGI) along with Italian Radicals and then returned to the Non-Inscrits.

Following the 2004 European Parliament election, Lega Nord joined the Independence/Democracy (I/D) group and later the Union for Europe of the Nations (UEN), a seemingly awkward affiliation for a party proposing a "Europe of the Regions"—but in the Lega Nord's view a state's "regions" are populated by "nations" such as the Catalans or the Lombards. The party was affiliated to the Alliance of Liberals and Democrats for Europe (ALDE) in the Parliamentary Assembly of the Council of Europe until 2006, when its members joined the European Democrat Group (EDG), a diverse group stretching from the British Conservative Party to United Russia.

Following the 2009 European Parliament election, Lega Nord joined the newly formed the Europe of Freedom and Democracy (EFD) group. One year after the 2014 European Parliament election, the party was a founding member of the Europe of Nations and Freedom (ENL) group. After the 2019 European Parliament election, Lega Nord co-founded the Identity and Democracy (ID) group, alongside the French National Rally, the Danish People's Party, the Freedom Party of Austria, the Conservative People's Party of Estonia, the Finns Party, the Belgian Vlaams Belang, the Czech Freedom and Direct Democracy party, and Alternative for Germany. Outside of its European parliamentary group, Lega also has contacts with the Spanish Vox, the Dutch Forum for Democracy, the Sweden Democrats, the Hungarian Fidesz, and the Polish Law and Justice party. In March 2017 the LN signed a cooperation protocol with United Russia.

The party has also been active in counter-jihad networks, and in 2016 signed the "Prague Declaration" as part of the Fortress Europe group alongside the Pegida movement and other groups against the "Islamic conquest of Europe".

== Factions ==
Although there are almost no official factions within the party, it is possible to distinguish several tendencies or wings.

=== Regional and ideological divides ===
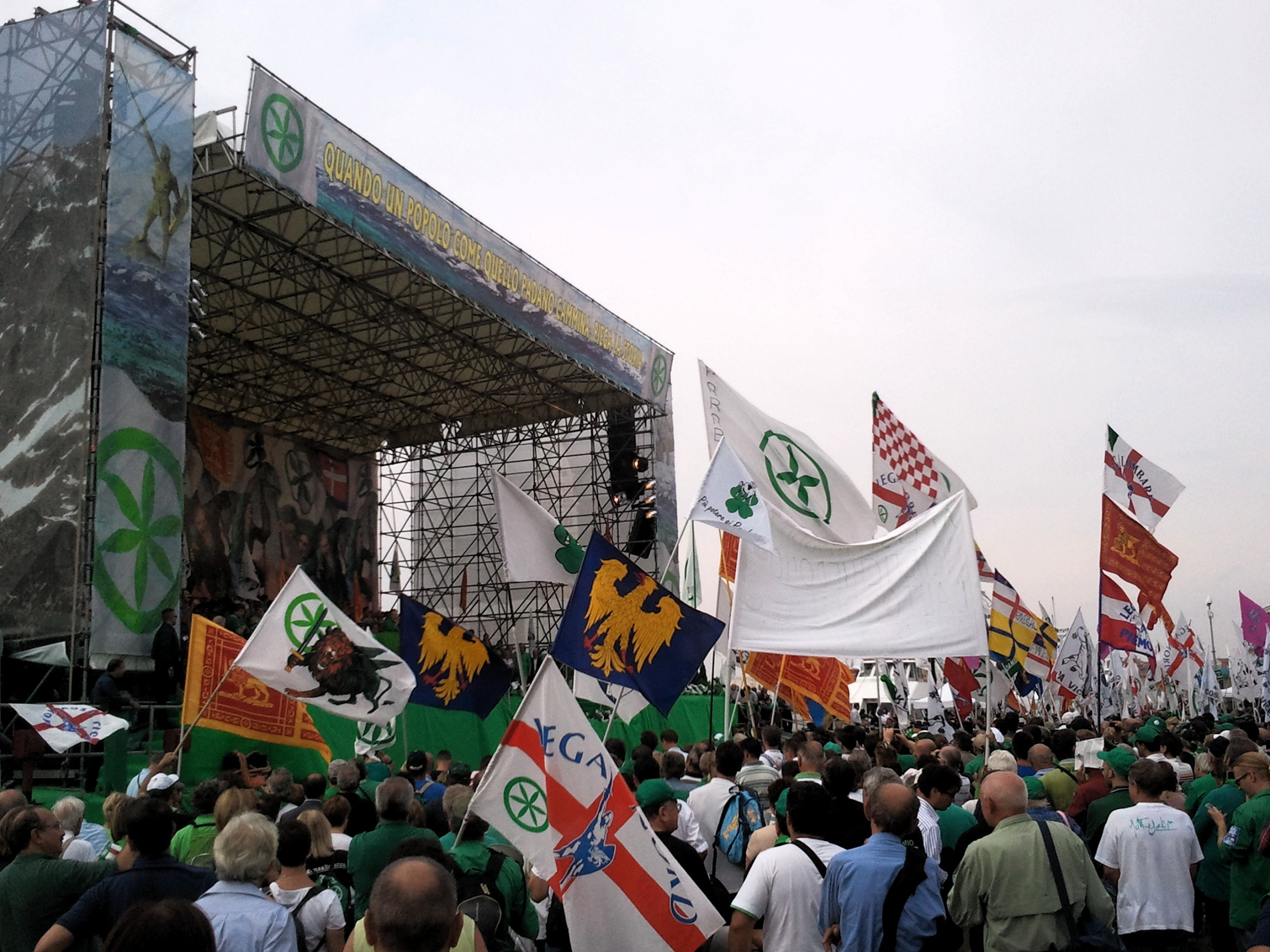
"Festival of the Padanian Peoples" in Venice, 2011

The wing from the province of Varese and more broadly the bulk of the original Lega Lombarda (including Umberto Bossi, Roberto Maroni and Marco Formentini) has tended to be the left wing of the party while that from the province of Bergamo (notably Roberto Calderoli) has tended to be more conservative. In fact, both Bossi and Maroni hailed from the far-left of the political spectrum, having been active in the Italian Communist Party, il manifesto movement, the Party of Proletarian Unity, Proletarian Democracy and the Greens before starting Lega Lombarda; and conceived Lega Nord as a centre-left (and to some extent social-democratic) political force. From the left came also Marco Formentini, a long-time member of the left wing of the Italian Socialist Party; and Rosi Mauro, a trade unionist of the metal workers' section of the Italian Labour Union and later leader of the Padanian Trade Union (SinPa).

Since its foundation, Liga Veneta was instead characterised as a liberal, centrist and economically libertarian outfit due to the political upbringing of its early leaders and a more conservative electoral base. In the early 1990s, the League took votes especially from the Communists and the Socialists in western and central Lombardy, while the party electorally replaced Christian Democracy in eastern Lombardy and Veneto.

Lega Lombarda also included liberal-conservative figures such as Gianfranco Miglio and Vito Gnutti, both former Christian Democrats, while Giovanni Meo Zilio, a Socialist partisan during the Italian Resistance, was one of the founding fathers of Liga Veneta.

In Emilia-Romagna, a left-wing heartland, the party has many former Communists in its ranks and many others have Communist upbringings. However, with the passing of time the party underwent a process of homogenisation.

Between Maroni and Calderoli, there has been a liberal centrist wing including Roberto Castelli, a conspicuous group of former Liberals (Manuela Dal Lago, Daniele Molgora, Francesco Speroni and more) and a new generation of leghisti (Roberto Cota, Giancarlo Giorgetti, Marco Reguzzoni, Luca Zaia and others).

=== Issue-oriented groups ===
The League is home also to some issue-oriented groups. First, there is a group of Christian democrats, most of whom are affiliated to the Padanian Catholics, founded by late Roberto Ronchi and currently led by Giuseppe Leoni. Another leading Catholic is Massimo Polledri. Many leghisti are committed to Catholic social teaching and the social market economy and several party members are former members or voters of Christian Democracy.

There is a right-wing which is represented mainly by Mario Borghezio, a former Monarchist and Ordine Nuovo member who is the leader of Christian Padania, which is a key advocate of social conservatism within party ranks and has some links with the traditionalist Society of St. Pius X.

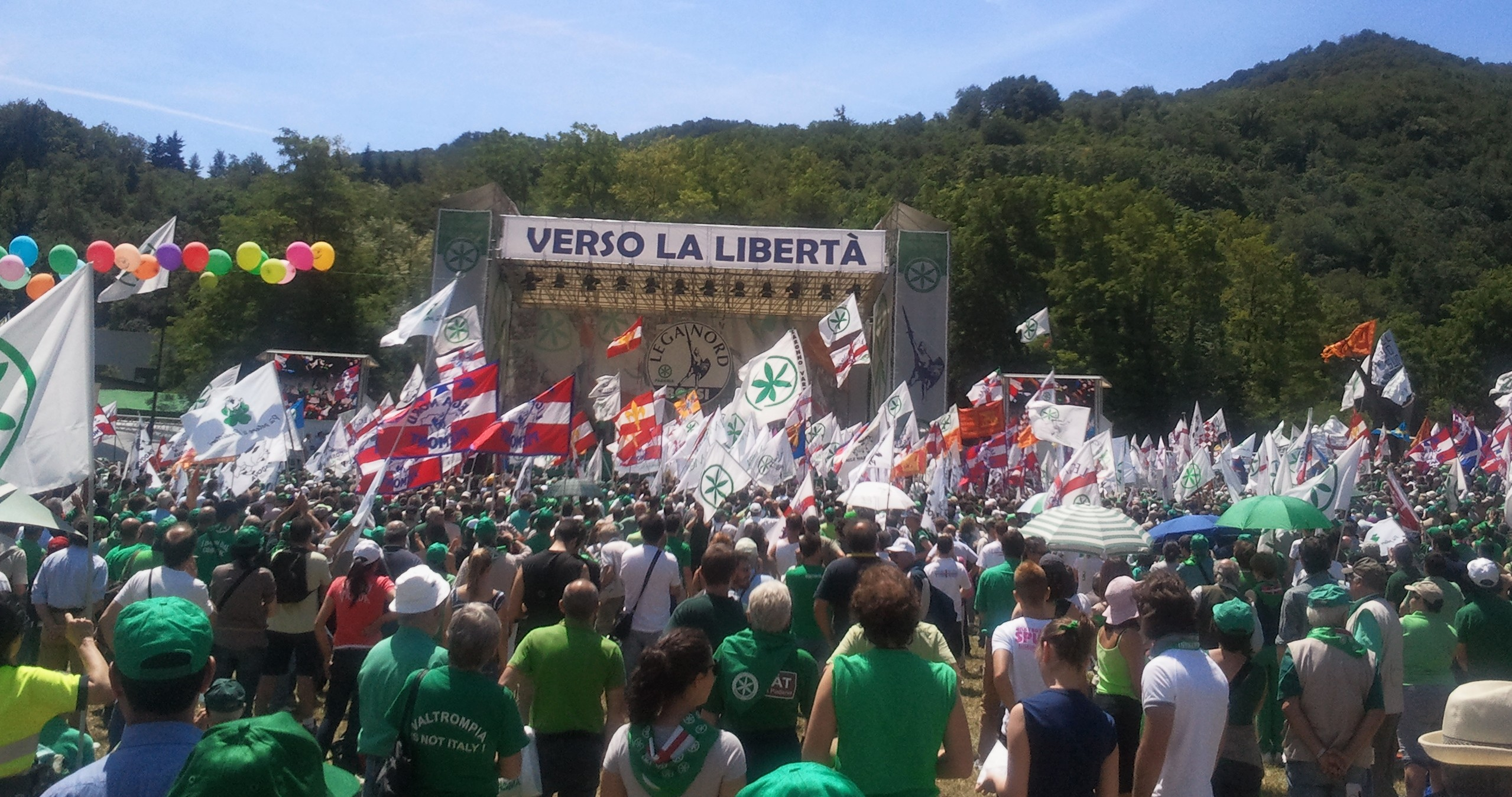
Traditional rally of Lega Nord in Pontida, 2011

Third and fourth, the party has always included also a group of libertarians, whose leading members Leonardo Facco, Gilberto Oneto and Giancarlo Pagliarini have since left the party; and an Independentist Unit. The independentist wing crosses all the other factions and tendencies and in fact includes Borghezio and Francesco Speroni, among others. Oneto, father of Padanian nationalism; and Pagliarini were also close to this group.

Finally, the party is home to an agricultural wing, which is particularly strong in southern Lombardy, Emilia-Romagna and Veneto and is represented by the Cobas del latte, a farmers' trade union; the Land Movement, whose leader was Giovanni Robusti; and politicians such as Luca Zaia, a former Minister of Agriculture, Fabio Rainieri, one of the leader of Lega Nord Emilia; and Erminio Boso, a historic and now marginal figure from Trentino.

=== 1997 Padanian Parliament election ===
In October 1997, Lega Nord organised what it called "the first elections to the Padanian Parliament". Roughly 4 million northern Italians (6 million according to the party) went to the polls and chose between a number of Padanian parties. This is a short resume of the affiliations of leading party members:

- Marco Formentini, Giovanni Meo Zilio, Roberto Bernardelli, Franco Colleoni and Mariella Mazzetto, with the support of Roberto Maroni, launched the Europeanist and social-democratic European Democrats – Padanian Labour (52 seats out of 210);
- Vito Gnutti, Giancarlo Pagliarini, Domenico Comino, Roberto Cota and Massimo Zanello led the liberal-conservative Liberal Democrats – Forza Padania (50);
- Oreste Rossi, Enzo Flego and Walter Gherardini formed the national-conservative Padanian Right (27);
- Roberto Ronchi and Giuseppe Leoni founded the Christian democratic Padanian Catholics (20);
- A group of Venetian leghisti formed the Venetist Padanian Lions (14);
- Leonardo Facco, Leopoldo Siegel and Marco Pottino launched Libertarian and Liberal Padania (12);
- Matteo Salvini and Mauro Manfredini were candidates of the Padanian Communists (5);
- Erminio Boso led the agrarian conservative Padanian Union – Agriculture, Environment, Hunting, Fishing (5);
- Benedetto Della Vedova, a Radical politician, was elected at the head of an anti-prohibitionist and free market libertarian list in Milan while Nando Dalla Chiesa, a Green MP, was an unsuccessful candidate in Milan too.

=== Differing viewpoints on coalitions ===
During the years in government in Rome (2001–2006), in the party there were different viewpoints on coalitions: some, led by Calderoli and Castelli (with the backing of Bossi), vigorously supported the alliance with the centre-right while others, represented by Maroni and Giorgetti, were less warm about it. Some of them spoke about joining the centre-left some time after the 2006 general election, which they were certain to lose. This idea was ascribed to the fact that without any support from the left it seemed even more difficult to win the constitutional referendum which would have turned Italy into a federal state.

Similar differences emerged during (and within) Berlusconi's fourth government (2008–2011). While Calderoli was again a keen supporter of the arrangement, Maroni was far less warm on Berlusconi and at times evoked an alliance with the centre-left Democratic Party. Calderoli's line had the backing of Federico Bricolo, Cota, Reguzzoni and chiefly Bossi while Maroni was backed by Giorgetti, Speroni, Zaia and Tosi. However, the alliance with the centre-right continued at the regional/local level (Veneto, Piedmont, Lombardy and others municipalities) after 2011 and has become a virtually permanent feature of Lega Nord's electoral politics.

=== 2008–2011 developments ===
Since 2008, besides the traditional regional divides, the party was increasingly divided among three groups. The first was the so-called "magic circle", that was to say Bossi's inner circle, notably including Marco Reguzzoni, Rosi Mauro and Federico Bricolo. The second was formed around Roberto Calderoli, who was the powerful coordinator of Lega Nord's national secretariats and had among his closest supporters Giacomo Stucchi and Davide Boni. The third one was led by Roberto Maroni, who tended to be more independent from Bossi and was somewhat critical of the centre-right affiliation of the party; and it included Giancarlo Giorgetti, Attilio Fontana, Matteo Salvini and Flavio Tosi. Gian Paolo Gobbo and Luca Zaia, leaders of the party in Veneto, although very loyal to Bossi, tended to be independent from "federal" factions and were engaged in a long power struggle with Flavio Tosi (see Liga Veneta#Factions). Indeed, Corriere della Sera identified four main groups: the magic circle, maroniani, calderoliani and "Venetians" (or, better, Venetists), leaving aside the core independentists (see Lega Nord#Issue-oriented groups). Roberto Cota, leader of Lega Nord Piemont, the third largest national section of Lega Nord, was very close to Bossi and was part of the magic circle, but since his election as President of Piedmont became more independent. Equidistant from the main factions were also Roberto Castelli and Francesco Speroni.

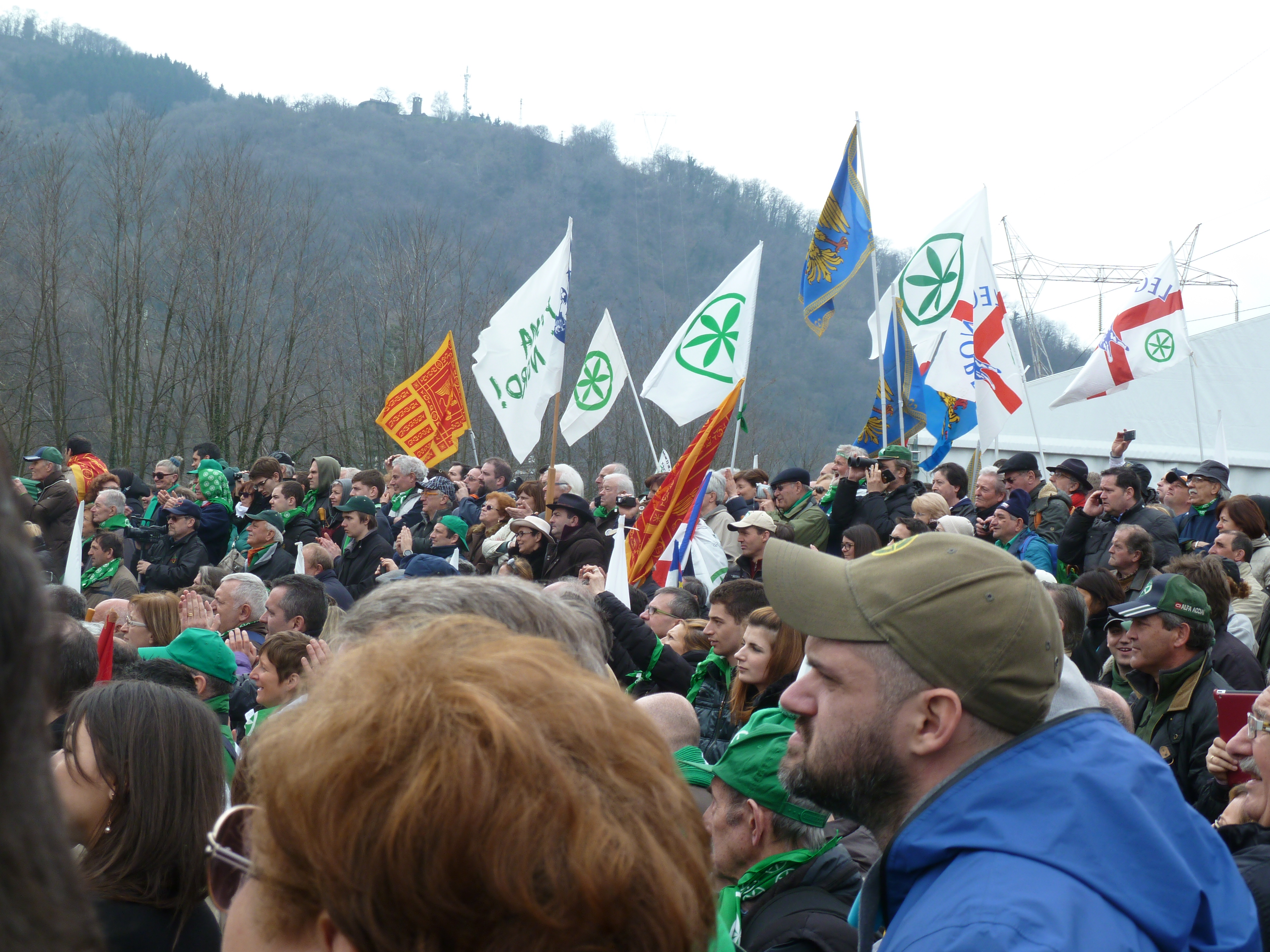
Traditional rally of Lega Nord in Pontida, 2013

By 2011, maroniani clearly became the strongest faction within the party and Maroni, who was acclaimed at the traditional rally in Pontida in June, became Bossi's obvious successor. Maroniani commanded wide support among rank-and-file members and were well represented in all regions, notably including Veneto, where Tosi was loyal to Maroni despite being a conservative-liberal. Maroni and Calderoli, who had been on opposite sides for years, joined forces against the magic circle and its influence on Bossi. After Pontida 2011, Mauro and Reguzzoni tried to convince Bossi to remove Giorgetti from the leadership of Lega Lombarda, but this move was strongly opposed by Maroni and Calderoli, who were supported in this also by Cota and most Venetians. The attempted "coup d'etat" produced an unparalleled backclash against the magic circle: 49 deputies out of 59 wanted to replace Reguzzoni as floor leader in the Chamber of Deputies with Stucchi, but Bossi imposed the status quo.

After earning resounding victories in the provincial congresses of Verona, Belluno and eastern Veneto during the first half of 2011, maroniani (with the support of calderoliani) prevailed also in Brescia and Val Camonica, defeating the candidates of the magic circle by landslides. In October, fearing a remake in Varese, his homeprovince, Bossi imposed his candidate, who was declared elected without a vote. In the event, Bossi was openly contested by many delegates at the congress and there had been an open vote, maroniani would have won. This party infighting ended with Bossi's downfall in February 2012 (see Lega Nord#From Bossi to Maroni).

=== 2013–2018 developments ===
Since Salvini's rise to leadership in 2013, the party sported the usual regional and ideological divides and especially that between Salvini and Tosi as the former displayed a more populist attitude, strongly opposed the Euro and nominally supported separatism while the latter presented himself as a more centrist figure, supported European integration, was soft on independence and unveiled a liberal program for his intended run in a putative "centre-right prime-ministerial primary election". As leader of Liga Veneta, Tosi, who was ejected from Lega Nord in March 2015, was confronted by the Venetist and separatist wings of the regional party, having in Zaia and Massimo Bitonci their leading members (see Liga Veneta#Factions). Those Venetists did not oppose Salvini's "Italian nationalist" turn.

Since 2014, Salvini started to build a network of supporters in central-southern Italy and the Isles with the creation of Us with Salvini, a sister party to Lega Nord. This was broadly accepted by Venetians, but it was increasingly opposed by key Lombard figures, including Bossi, Maroni and Paolo Grimoldi (leader of Lega Lombarda), who criticised the LN's right-wing turn and its focus on the South while reclaiming the federalist and autonomist identity of the LN.

In the 2017 leadership election, Salvini easily fended off the challenge posed by Gianni Fava, Lombard minister of Agriculture in the old social-democratic tradition, representing the federalist/autonomist/separatist wing of the party. Fava, who was anti-prohibition of drugs, pro-civil unions for same-sex couples, pro-Atlanticism, and anti-National Front ("[it] is one of the most centralist and conservative blocs in Europe, what has it to do with us?"), recalled an old activist saying "let's hurry up in making Padania, that I want to return voting for the left" and added "this was the League and it has to be like this anew". After Marine Le Pen's defeat by Emmanuel Macron in the second round of the French presidential election, Maroni declared that the "tactical and not strategic" alliance with Le Pen, "who wants to go back to national states", was over and that "we should return to our origins of post-ideological movement, neither right nor left". Maroni added that "the League is not right-wing, we have done things in Lombardy that the red regions would dream of, from the baby bonus to the welfare. Typically left-wing policies. For us there are the Lombards, not those of right or left". Finally, reminding Salvini's left-wing roots, he remarked that "those are the origins" and that also Salvini would eventually share his views. More worryingly for party's unity, Bossi threatened to leave the party and form an alternative movement with Roberto Bernardelli's Padanian Union.

The tensions between Salvini and Maroni culminated in latter's decision not to run for a second term as President of Lombardy in 2018. On that occasion, Maroni was very critical of Salvini in an interview with Il Foglio. As a result, very few maroniani were selected as candidates for the 2018 general election and Fava was also excluded. Bossi, who had not left the party, was selected by Salvini to lead the LN's list for the Senate in Varese, but he was challenged also by Gianluigi Paragone, a former LN member who had switched to the Five Star Movement; and Great North, a party launched by Bernardelli and Marco Reguzzoni.

== Popular support ==
Support for Lega Nord is diverse even within Padania and has varied over time, reaching an early maximum of 10.1% of the vote at the 1996 general election (around 25% north of the Po River). That year, the League scored 29.3% of the vote in Veneto, 25.5% in Lombardy, 23.2% in Friuli-Venezia Giulia, 18.2% in Piedmont, 13.2% in Trentino-Alto Adige/Südtirol, 10.2% in Liguria, 7.2% in Emilia-Romagna, 1.8% in Tuscany, 1.5% in the Marche and 1.0% in Umbria. The party got 59 deputies and 27 senators (39 and 19, respectively, in single-seat constituencies), helping the centre-left to win due to its victories in some Northern constituencies characterised by three-way races. The League won barely all the seats in the provinces of the so-called Pedemontana, the area at the feet of the Prealps, from Udine to Cuneo, encompassing Friuli, Veneto, Trentino, Lombardy and Piedmont. Lega Nord is stronger in the areas of the late Republic of Venice and among Catholics.

At the 2008 general election, Lega Nord scored 8.3% at the national level, slightly below the result of 1996: 27.1% in Veneto, 21.6% in Lombardy, 13.0% in Friuli-Venezia Giulia, 12.6% in Piedmont, 9.4% in Trentino-Alto Adige, 7.8% in Emilia-Romagna, 6.8% in Liguria, 2.2% in the Marche, 2.0% in Tuscany and 1.7% in Umbria.

At the 2009 European Parliament election, Lega Nord won 10.2% of the vote: 28.4% in Veneto, 22.7% in Lombardy, 17.5% in Friuli-Venezia Giulia, 15.7% in Piedmont, 9.9% in Trentino-Alto Adige, 11.1% in Emilia-Romagna, 9.9% in Liguria, 5.5% in the Marche, 4.3% in Tuscany and 3.6% in Umbria. At the 2014 European Parliament election, the party scored 15.2% in Veneto and 14.6% in Lombardy.

At the 2010 regional elections, the party gained 35.2% of the vote in Veneto, 26.2% in Lombardy, 16.7% in Piedmont, 13.7% in Emilia-Romagna, 10.2% in Liguria, 6.3% in the Marche, 6.5% in Tuscany and 4.3% in Umbria. At the 2014–2015 regional elections, it obtained 40.9% in Veneto, 20.3% in Liguria, 19.4% in Emilia-Romagna, 16.2% in Tuscany, 14.0% in Umbria and 13.0% in Marche, marking its best results so far in those six regions.

The 2013 general election was not a good moment for the party, which gained meagre results, e.g. 12.9% in Lombardy and 10.5% in Veneto.

Five years later, the party obtained its best results so far in the 2018 general election: 17.4% in Italy, 32.2% in Veneto, 28.0% in Lombardy, 26.7% in Trentino, 25.8% in Friuli-Venezia Giulia, 22.6% in Piedmont, 20.2% in Umbria, 19.9% in Liguria, 19.2% in Emilia-Romagna, as well as significant results in the South (5–10%).

In the 2019 European Parliament election the party again increased its share of the vote: 34.3% in Italy, 49.9% in Veneto, 43.4% in Lombardy, 42.6% in Friuli-Venezia Giulia, 37.7% in Trentino, 38.2% in Umbria, 38% in Marche, 37.1% in Piedmont, 33.9% in Liguria, 33.8% in Emilia-Romagna, 31.5% in Tuscany, as well as 15-25% in the South.

The electoral results of the LN in general (Chamber of Deputies) and European Parliament elections since 1989 are shown in the chart below.

View source data.

== Electoral results ==
=== Italian Parliament ===
Chamber of Deputies
Election year	Votes	%	Seats	+/−	Leader
1992	3,395,384 (4th)	8.6	55 / 630	–	Umberto Bossi
1994	3,235,248 (5th)	8.4	117 / 630	▲62	Umberto Bossi
1996	3,776,354 (4th)	10.8	59 / 630	▼58	Umberto Bossi
2001	1,464,301 (6th)	3.9	30 / 630	▼28	Umberto Bossi
2006	1,749,632 (6th)	4.6	28 / 630	▼2	Umberto Bossi
2008	3,024,758 (3rd)	8.3	60 / 630	▲32	Umberto Bossi
2013	1,390,156 (5th)	4.1	20 / 630	▼42	Roberto Maroni
2018	5,698,687 (3rd)	17.4	124 / 630	▲104	Matteo Salvini

Senate of the Republic
Election year	Votes	%	Seats	+/−	Leader
1992	2,732,461 (4th)	8.2	25 / 315	–	Umberto Bossi
1994	with PdL	–	60 / 315	▲35	Umberto Bossi
1996	3,394,733 (4th)	10.4	27 / 315	▼33	Umberto Bossi
2001	with CdL	–	17 / 315	▼10	Umberto Bossi
2006	1,530,667 (6th)	4.5	13 / 315	▼4	Umberto Bossi
2008	2,644,248 (3rd)	7.9	26 / 315	▲13	Umberto Bossi
2013	1,328,555 (5th)	4.3	18 / 315	▼8	Roberto Maroni
2018	5,321,537 (3rd)	17.6	58 / 315	▲40	Matteo Salvini

=== European Parliament ===
European Parliament
Election year	Votes	%	Seats	+/−	Leader
1989	636,242 (9th)	1.8	2 / 81	–	Umberto Bossi
1994	2,162,586 (5th)	6.5	6 / 87	▲4	Umberto Bossi
1999	1,395,547 (6th)	4.5	4 / 87	▼2	Umberto Bossi
2004	1,613,506 (7th)	5.0	4 / 78	–	Umberto Bossi
2009	3,126,915 (3rd)	10.2	9 / 72	▲5	Umberto Bossi
2014	1,688,197 (4th)	6.2	5 / 73	▼4	Matteo Salvini
2019	9,175,208 (1st)	34.3	29 / 76	▲24	Matteo Salvini

=== Electoral results by region ===
The electoral results of Lega Nord (and its predecessors) in northern and north-central regions are shown in the table below.

==== Chamber of Deputies ====
Year	Aosta V.	Piedmont	Lombardy	Trentino-ST	Veneto	Friuli-VG	Emilia-R.	Liguria	Tuscany	Marche	Umbria	ITALY
1992	–	16.3	23.0	8.9	17.8	15.3	9.6	14.3	3.1	1.3	1.1	8.7
1994	17.2 (Note: Forza Italia did not run in the region's sole constituency, but supported Lega Nord's candidate.)	11.4	15.7	7.6	22.1	21.6	16.9	6.4	2.2	–	–	8.4
1996	8.1	18.2	25.5	13.2	29.3	23.2	7.2	10.2	1.8	1.5	1.1	10.1
2001	w. FI	3.9	12.1	3.7	10.2	8.2	3.3	5.9	0.6	0.3	–	3.9
2006	2.0	6.3	11.7	4.5	11.1	7.2	3.9	3.7	1.1	1.0	0.8	4.1
2008	3.1	12.6	21.6	9.4	27.1	13.0	7.8	6.8	2.0	2.2	1.7	8.3
2013	3.3	4.8	12.9	4.2	10.5	6.7	2.6	2.3	0.7	0.7	0.6	4.1
2018	17.5	22.6	28.0	19.2	32.2	25.8	19.2	19.9	17.4	17.3	20.2	17.4

==== European Parliament ====
Year	Aosta V.	Piedmont	Lombardy	Trentino-ST	Veneto	Friuli-VG	Emilia-R.	Liguria	Tuscany	Marche	Umbria	ITALY
1989	0.5	2.1	8.1	0.3	1.7	0.5	0.5	1.4	0.2	0.1	0.1	1.8
1994	5.7	11.5	17.7	4.8	15.7	11.2	6.4	8.0	1.6	0.8	0.6	6.6
1999	2.0	7.8	13.1	2.4	10.7	10.1	3.0	3.7	0.6	0.4	0.3	4.5
2004	3.0	8.2	13.8	3.5	14.1	8.5	3.4	4.1	0.8	0.9	0.6	5.0
2009	4.4	15.7	22.7	9.9	28.4	17.5	11.1	9.9	4.3	5.5	3.6	10.2
2014	6.8	7.6	14.6	7.6	15.6	9.3	5.0	5.6	2.6	2.7	2.5	6.2
2019	37.2	37.1	43.4	27.8	49.9	42.6	33.8	33.9	31.5	38.0	38.2	34.3

==== Regional Councils ====
Year	Aosta V.	Piedmont	Lombardy	S. Tyrol	Trentino	Veneto	Friuli-VG	Emilia-R.	Liguria	Tuscany	Marche	Umbria
1985	–	1.1	0.5	–	–	3.7	–	0.4	0.9	0.5	0.6	0.4
1990	–	5.1	18.9	–	–	7.2	–	2.9	6.1	0.8	0.2	0.2
1993	7.6	–	–	3.0	16.2	–	26.7	–	–	–	–	–
1995	–	9.9	17.7	–	–	16.7	–	3.4	6.6	0.7	0.5	–
1998	3.4	–	–	0.9	8.8	–	17.3	–	–	–	–	–
2000	–	7.6	15.5	–	–	12.0	–	2.6	4.3	0.6	–	0.3
2003	–	–	–	9.3	0.5	–	6.2	–	–	–	–	–
2005	–	8.5	15.8	–	–	14.7	–	4.8	4.7	1.3	0.9	–
2008	–	–	–	2.1	19.0	–	12.9	–	–	–	–	–
2010	–	16.7	26.2	–	–	35.2	–	13.6	10.2	6.4	6.3	4.3
2013	w. SA	–	23.2 (Note: Combined result of party list (13.0%) and Roberto Maroni's personal list (10.2%).)	2.5	6.2	–	8.3	–	–	–	–	–
2014	–	7.3	–	–	–	–	–	19.4	–	–	–	–
2015	–	–	–	–	–	40.9 (Note: Combined result of party list (17.8%) and Luca Zaia's personal list (23.1%).)	–	–	20.3	16.2	13.0	14.0
2018	17.1	37.1	29.4 (Note: Combined result of party list (29.4%) and Attilio Fontana's personal list (1.5%).)	11.1	27.1	–	34.9	–	–	–	–	–
2019	37.1	–	–	–	–	–	–	–	–	–	–	40.9 (Note: Combined result of party list (37.0%) and Donatella Tesei's personal list (3.9%).)
2020	23.9	–	–	–	–	61.5 (Note: Combined result of party list (16.9%) and Luca Zaia's personal list (44.6%).)	–	34.0 (Note: Combined result of party list (32.0%), Lucia Borgonzoni's personal list (1.7%) and "Youth for the Environment" formed by young Leghisti (0.3%).)	17.1	21.8	22.4	-

== Name and symbols ==
Thanks to its use of the figure of Alberto da Giussano—legendary warrior of the Lombard League during the Battle of Legnano—in his iconography and campaigns, the LN has been nicknamed "il Carroccio" by the Italian media, a reference to a four-wheeled war altar used during the battle. Later on, the "sun of the Alps" was chosen as a symbol of Padanian nationalism. The party also made Va, pensiero by Giuseppe Verdi Padania's "national" anthem.

== Leadership ==
=== Federal party ===
- Federal Secretary: Umberto Bossi (1989–2012), Roberto Maroni (2012–2013), Matteo Salvini (2013–2020), Igor Iezzi (2020–present, commissioner)
  - Deputy Federal Secretary: Francesco Formenti (1992–1995), Francesco Speroni (1998–1999), Gianpaolo Dozzo (1998–1999), Mario Borghezio (1998–1999), Federico Caner (vicar, 2012–2013), Giacomo Stucchi (2012–2013), Elena Maccanti (2012–2013), Matteo Salvini (2013), Flavio Tosi (2013), Riccardo Molinari (2014–2016), Edoardo Rixi (2014–2016), Giancarlo Giorgetti (2016–2020), Lorenzo Fontana (2016–2020), Andrea Crippa (2019–2020)
  - Coordinator of National Sections/Organisational Secretary: Roberto Calderoli (2002–2020)
  - Coordinator of Federal Secretariat/Legislative Office: Roberto Ronchi (1991–1994), Roberto Maroni (1994–2001), Francesco Speroni (2001–2005), Roberto Maroni (2005–2012), Giacomo Stucchi (2012–2013), Federico Bricolo (2013–2016)
- Federal President: Marilena Marin (1989–1991), Franco Rocchetta (1991–1994), Stefano Stefani (1995–2002), Luciano Gasperini (2002–2005), Angelo Alessandri (2005–2012), Umberto Bossi (2012–2026)
  - Honorary President: Luigi Rossi (1991–1996)
- Federal Administrative Secretary/Administrator: Alessandro Patelli (1991–1993), Maurizio Balocchi (1993–2010), Francesco Belsito (2010–2012), Stefano Stefani (2012–2014), Giulio Centemero (2014–present)
- Party Leader in the Chamber of Deputies: Marco Formentini (1992–1993), Roberto Maroni (1993–1994), Pierluigi Petrini (1994–1995), Vito Gnutti (1995–1996), Domenico Comino (1996–1999), Giancarlo Pagliarini (1999–2001), Alessandro Cè (2001–2005), Andrea Gibelli (2005–2006), Roberto Maroni (2006–2008), Roberto Cota (2008–2010), Marco Reguzzoni (2010–2012), Gianpaolo Dozzo (2012–2013), Giancarlo Giorgetti (2013–2014), Massimiliano Fedriga (2014–2018), Giancarlo Giorgetti (2018), Riccardo Molinari (2018–present)
- Party Leader in the Senate: Francesco Speroni (1992–1994), Francesco Tabladini (1994–1996), Francesco Speroni (1996–1999), Luciano Gasperini (1998–1999), Roberto Castelli (1999–2001), Francesco Moro (2001–2004), Ettore Pirovano (2004–2006), Roberto Castelli (2006–2008), Federico Bricolo (2008–2013), Massimo Bitonci (2013–2014), Gian Marco Centinaio (2014–2018), Massimiliano Romeo (2018–present)
- Party Leader in the European Parliament: Francesco Speroni (1989–1992), Luigi Moretti (1992–1999), Francesco Speroni (1999–2004), Mario Borghezio (2004–2009), Francesco Speroni (2009–2012), Lorenzo Fontana (2012–2014), Matteo Salvini (2014–2018), Mara Bizzotto (2018–2019), Marco Campomenosi (2019–present)

=== Major national sections ===
Liga Veneta

- Secretary: Achille Tramarin (1980−1983), Marilena Marin (1983−1984), Franco Rocchetta (1984−1985), Marilena Marin (1985−1994), Fabrizio Comencini (1994−1998), Gian Paolo Gobbo (1998−2012), Flavio Tosi (2012−2015), Gianpaolo Dozzo (commissioner 2015–2016), Gianantonio Da Re (2016–2019), Lorenzo Fontana (commissioner 2019–2020), Alberto Stefani (2020–2026, commissioner 2020–2023), Andrea Tomaello (commissioner 2026–present)
- President: Franco Rocchetta (1991−1994), Gian Paolo Gobbo (1994−1998), Giuseppe Ceccato (1998–1999), Manuela Dal Lago (2001−2008), Flavio Tosi (2008−2012), Luca Baggio (2012–2015), Massimo Bitonci (2016–2020)

Lega Lombarda

- Secretary: Umberto Bossi (1984–1993), Luigi Negri (1993–1995), Roberto Calderoli (1995–2002), Giancarlo Giorgetti (2002–2012), Matteo Salvini (2012–2014), Stefano Borghesi (commissioner 2014–2015), Paolo Grimoldi (2015–2021), Fabrizio Cecchetti (commissioner 2021–2024), Massimiliano Romeo (2024–present)
- President: Augusto Arizzi (1986–1987), Silvana Bazzan (1987–1989), Franco Castellazzi (1989–1991), Francesco Speroni (1991–1993), Roberto Calderoli (1993–1995), Giuseppe Leoni (1995–1999), Stefano Galli (1999–2002), Roberto Castelli (2002–2012), Giancarlo Giorgetti (2012–2017), Giacomo Stucchi (2017–2020)

Piemont Autonomista/Lega Nord Piemont

- Secretary: Gipo Farassino (1987–1997), Domenico Comino (1997–1999), Bernardino Bosio (1999–2001), Roberto Cota (2001–2016), Riccardo Molinari (2016–present, commissioner 2020–2023)
- President: Angelo Colli (1991–1992), Domenico Comino (1994–1997), Bernardino Bosio (1997–1999), Silvano Straneo (2000–2001), Oreste Rossi (2001–2004), Mario Borghezio (2004–2011), Gianna Gancia (2012–2016), Stefano Allasia (2016–2020)

== See also ==
- List of regional and minority parties in Europe
- List of active separatist movements in Europe
