= Domenico Comino =

Italian politician (born 1955)

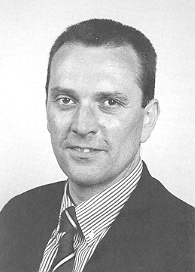
- Comino in 1994

Minister for the Coordination of European Union Policies
- In office 10 May 1994 – 17 January 1995
- Prime Minister: Silvio Berlusconi
- Preceded by: Livio Paladin
- Succeeded by: Enrico Letta

Member of the Chamber of Deputies
- In office 23 April 1992 – 29 May 2001

Personal details
- Born: 27 September 1955 (age 70) Morozzo, Italy
- Party: Northern League (1989-1999)
- Education: University of Turin
- Occupation: Politician, agronomist

Domenico Comino (born 27 September 1955) is an Italian politician, who served as the minister of European affairs and state minister in the mid-1990s.

== Biography ==
Comino was born in Morozzo on 27 September 1955. He is one of the former leaders of Lega Nord. He served as state minister for the EU relations in the first cabinet of Silvio Berlusconi in 1994. Comino was one of the five Lega members in the cabinet who resigned from office in December 1994 in order to vote against Berlusconi in the censure motion.

Comino served in the Italian parliament for three successive periods between 1992 and 1997. Until 1999 he was the Lega Nord's president of the Piedmont region. In 1999, he was expelled from Lega Nord and joined an electoral alliance with Forza Italia.
