= Francesco Speroni =

Italian politician

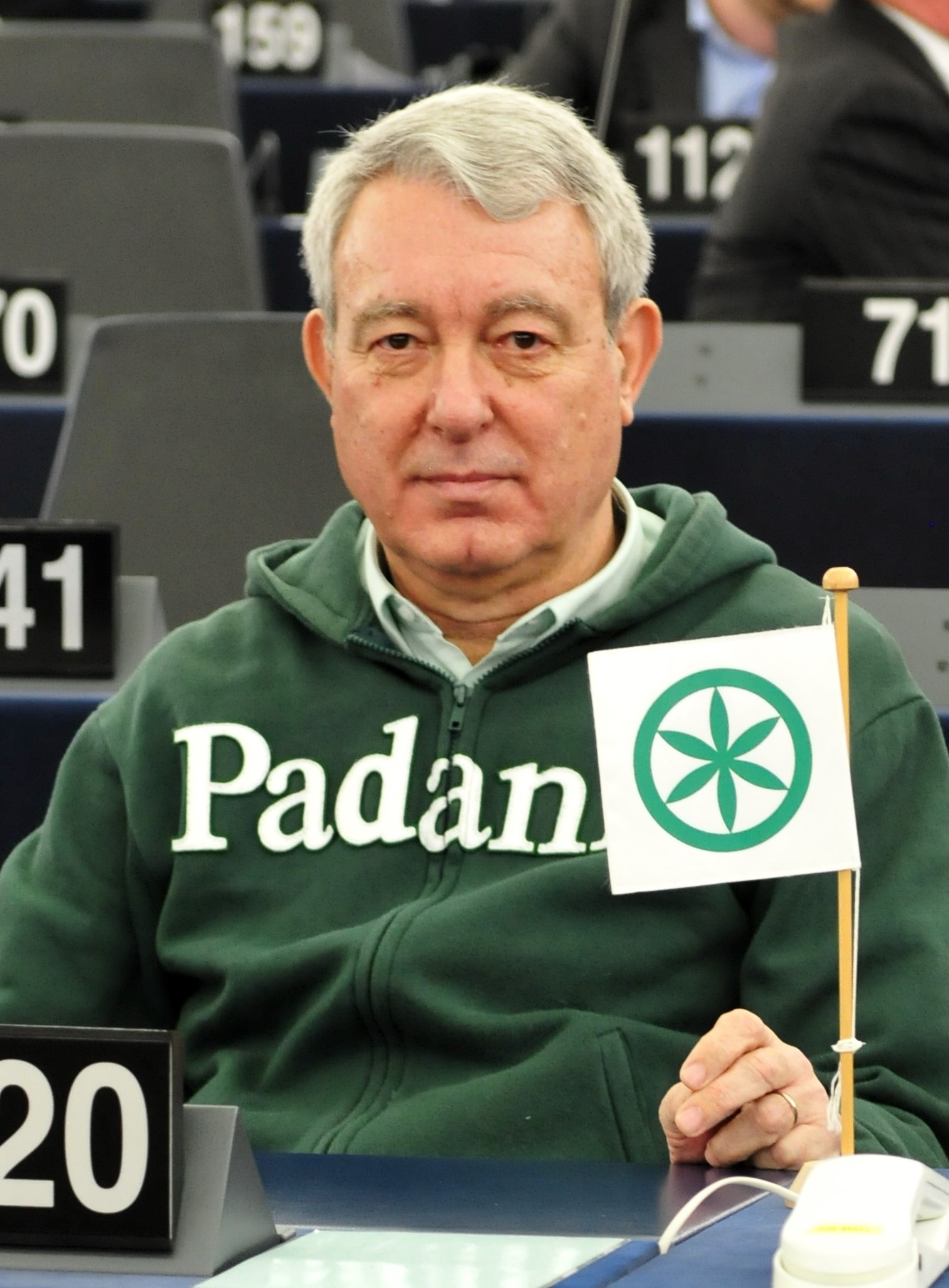
Francesco Speroni, 2014

Francesco Enrico Speroni (born 4 October 1946, in Busto Arsizio) is an Italian politician.

== Career ==
Speroni has been flight engineer from 1970 to 1997, remaining on leave since 1989. A member of the Northern League, Speroni has been a Member of the European Parliament from 1989 to 1994, a Senator from 1992 to 1999 and again an MEP from 1999 to 2014.

He served as Minister for Institutional Reforms in first Berlusconi government, from 1994 to 1995.

As MEP, he co-chaired the Europe of Freedom and Democracy group from 2009 to 2014. He sat also on the European Parliament Committee on Legal Affairs and has been a substitute for the Committee on Foreign Affairs and a member of the Delegation to the EU-Mexico Joint Parliamentary Committee.

In 2011, Speroni stated that "Breivik's ideas are in defence of western civilisation" following the 2011 Norway attacks.

== Education ==
- 1975: Political science degree
- 1999: Law degree
