= Manuela Dal Lago =

Italian politician (born 1946)

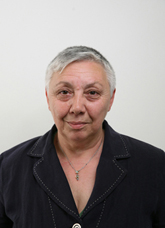
Manuela Dal Lago

Manuela Dal Lago (Vicenza, 10 August 1946) is an Italian politician. She is member of Liga Veneta-Lega Nord.

In the late 1970s she started her political career in the Italian Liberal Party, reaching the position of youth leader of the party in Veneto. At that time her followers included Giancarlo Galan, Fabio Gava and Niccolò Ghedini, all leading members of Forza Italia in the Region.

In the early 1990s she joined Liga Veneta, of which she has been the national president since 2001.

In 1997 Dal Lago was elected President of the Province of Vicenza only with the support of her party, while she was re-elected in 2002 with the support of all the centre-right House of Freedoms coalition.

In the 2008 general election she was elected to the Italian Chamber of Deputies, where she is currently Vice President of the parliamentary group of Lega Nord.
