= Mario Borghezio =

Italian politician (born 1947)

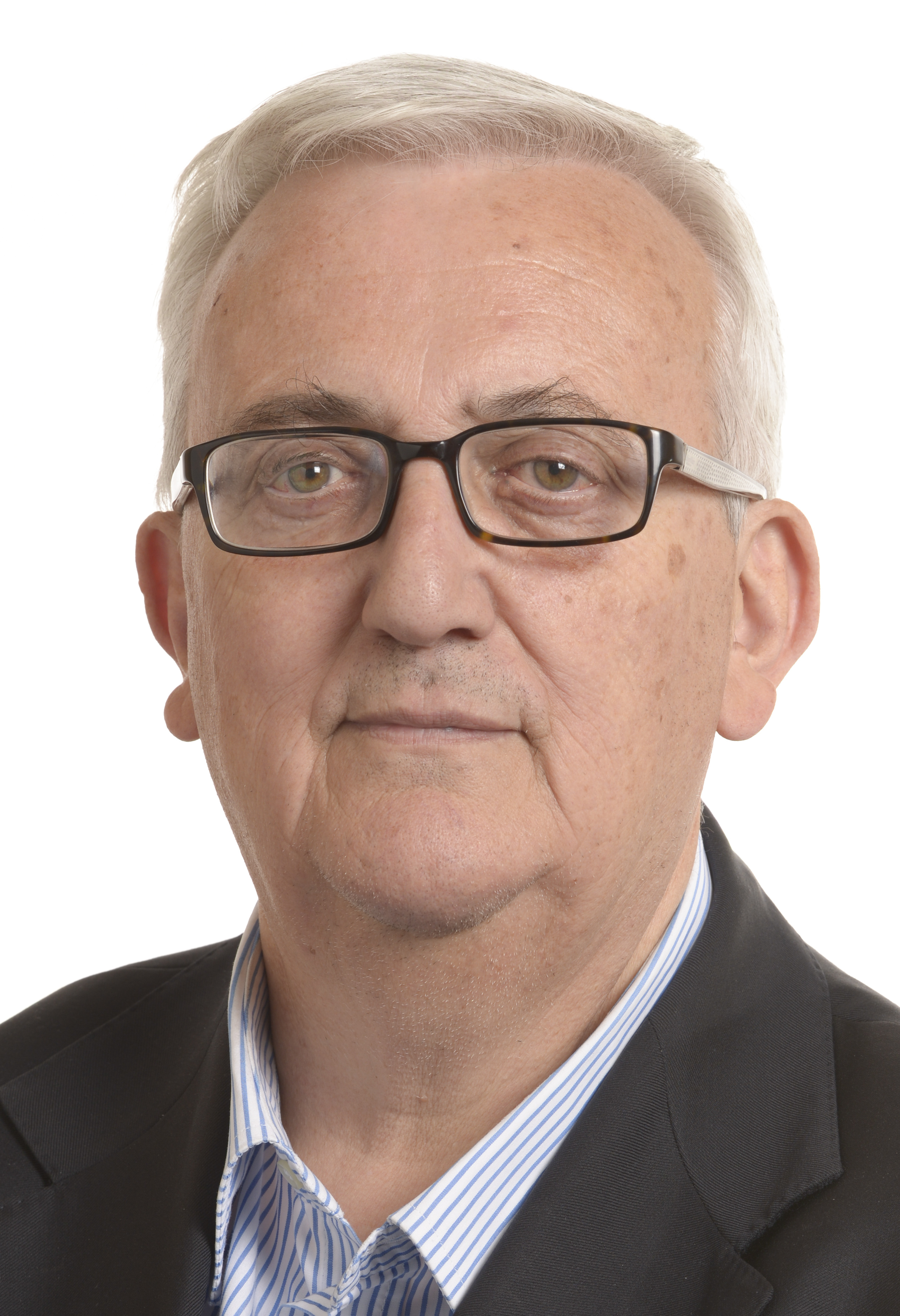

Member of the European Parliament
- In office 14 June 2001 – 1 July 2019
- Constituency: North-West Italy (2001–14); Central Italy (2014–19)

Member of the Chamber of Deputies
- In office 23 April 1992 – 29 May 2001
- Constituency: Piedmont

Personal details
- Born: 3 December 1947 (age 78) Turin, Piedmont, Italy
- Citizenship: Italy
- Party: Lega Nord (1991–2026); National Future (2026–present)
- Other political affiliations: Jeune Europe (1962–69); Ordine Nuovo (1969–79); Autonomist Piedmont (1987–91)
- Education: University of Turin
- Profession: Lawyer

Mario Borghezio (Italian: [ˈmaːrjo borˈɡɛttsjo]; born 3 December 1947) is an Italian politician who represented Lega Nord in the Chamber of Deputies from 1992 to 2001, and as a Member of the European Parliament from 2001 to 2019.

== Early political activities ==
Borghezio was born in Turin. A former member of the Jeune Europe movement founded by Jean Thiriart, he was also a member of Ordine Nuovo in the 1970s. In the mid 1980s, Borghezio was a member of the group around the Orion magazine, a meeting point of Piemontese neofascists, and he served as director of the economic supplement, Orion-Finanza. A proponent of antisemitic conspiracy theories at the time, Borghezio later went on to join the "autonomist" movement at the suggestion of Maurizio Murelli, the founder of the journal and close acquaintance of Borghezio. He has also regularly taken part in rallies and congresses of the neo-fascist New Force.

== Convictions and issues ==
Borghezio was sentenced to pay a fine of the equivalent of 450 € for violence on a minor in 1993. He forcefully held and turned over to the police a 12-year-old Moroccan unregistered street seller.

He was found guilty of arson in July 2005, for setting fire to the pallets of some migrants sleeping under a bridge in Turin during a vigilante raid. For this he was sentenced to two months and twenty days in prison, converted into a fine of €3,040.

On 17 December 2005, Borghezio was injured by No Tav activists, who recognised him on a train from Turin to Venice. Because of the encounter, he had to undergo an operation for a fractured nasal septum. That morning, he had participated in a counter-protest against the No Tav movement in the Susa Valley.

Borghezio was arrested by Belgian police on 11 September 2007 for participating in a protest against the Islamisation of Europe. On 9 June 2011, he was arrested by Swiss policemen after attempting to join the 2011 annual Bilderberg conference at St. Moritz (Switzerland). He was banished from the Canton of Graubünden for the duration of the meeting. The Italian embassy in Berne lodged a diplomatic protest.

He was suspended for three months on 30 July 2011 by his party for praising several of the ideas in the manifesto of Anders Behring Breivik, the terrorist who perpetrated the 2011 Norway attacks.

In June 2013, he was expelled from the Europe of Freedom and Democracy, a eurosceptic group in the European Parliament, for making racist remarks regarding Italy's first black cabinet minister, Cécile Kyenge. He was fined 1000 euros in May 2017 by the Milan Tribunal for racist and defamatory remarks made against Kyenge during a call-in radio show. He was also ordered to pay her an indemnity of 50'000 euros.

== Views and activities ==
Borghezio participated in an Anti-Islamisation Congress arranged by the Pro Cologne Citizens' Movement in Cologne, Germany in opposition against a mosque in 2008.

In August 2010, he called for the European Union to have its own, centralised, X-Files where anyone would be able to access information on UFOs, even records held by the military. Borghezio argued that governments should go public with the information they hold and stop what he believes is a “systematic cover-up”. Not satisfied with a central archive, Borghezio also wants a scientific centre to research UFOs, because he feels that such study would have “major scientific and technological spin-offs”. “I think that, under the principle of transparency, the EU member states have a duty to make public and available to all scientific data on UFOs which today are partially or wholly withheld”.

He participated in and held a speech at an international counter-jihad conference in Paris in December 2010.

In May 2011, he made inflammatory remarks after the arrest of Ratko Mladić, the Serbian military leader indicted for war crimes at the Hague, including the genocide of 8000 Muslim men and boys at Srebrenica. Borghezio was quoted as saying that "Mladić is a Patriot" and "The Serbs could have halted the advance of Islam into Europe, but they weren't allowed to do so."

In August 2019, Borghezio was reported to have asked the Italian government to sell Sicily, Sardinia and Naples to foreign countries.

== Quotes ==
In an interview published on 7 February 2006 on Corriere Della Sera, Borghezio said: "When I'm on stage at a political rally, I become a different person. I say whatever comes out of my gut. It's exciting. No, it's more than exciting: it's like having an orgasm".

"Gaddafi was a great leader, a true revolutionary who should not be confused with the new Libyan leadership swept into power by NATO's bayonets and by oil multinationals", Reaction to the death of Muammar Gaddafi.

In October 2012 Borghezio cosponsored with fellow MEP Lorenzo Fontana a motion for a declaration by the EU Parliament calling upon Pope Benedict XVI to carry out the Consecration of Russia to the Immaculate Heart of Mary.

== Electoral history ==
Election	House	Constituency	Party	Votes	Result
1992	Chamber of Deputies	Turin–Novara–Vercelli	LN	6,685	Elected
1994	Chamber of Deputies	Piedmont 1	LN	– (Note: Candidate in a closed list proportional representation system.)	Elected
1996	Chamber of Deputies	Piedmont 1	LN	–	Elected
1999	European Parliament	North-West Italy	LN	23,738	Not elected
2001	Chamber of Deputies	Piedmont 1	LN	–	Not elected
2004	European Parliament	North-West Italy	LN	36,139	Elected
2009	European Parliament	North-West Italy	LN	48,207	Elected
2014	European Parliament	Central Italy	LN	5,844	Elected
