= Gianni Fava =

Italian politician

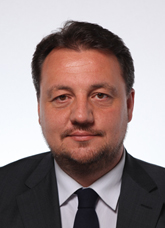
Giovanni Fava (2013)

Giovanni Fava (born in Viadana on 8 May 1968) is an Italian politician of Lega Nord, MP in the Italian Chamber of Deputies from 28 April 2006 to 4 June 2013 and Mayor of Pomponesco for two consecutive full terms from 22 November 1993 to 13 May 2001.

He is mostly known as Gianni Fava.

== Biography ==
Giovanni Fava was born on 8 May 1968 in Viadana, but he lives with his family in Pomponesco. He is also a businessman and president of Zebre Parma rugby franchise.

=== Career as politician ===
Elected as a member of Montecitorio (the Italian Chamber of Deputies) in the 2006 general election who took place on 9–10 April 2006, Giovanni Fava was proclaimed MP on 28 April 2006 (this term officially ended on 28 April 2008). Re-elected in the 2008 general election who took part on 13–14 April 2008, Fava was proclaimed MP on 29 April 2008 (this term officially ended on 14 March 2013). Re-elected also in the 2013 general election who took place on 24–25 February 2013, Fava was proclaimed MP on 5 March 2013 and officially started the new legislature on 15 March, but on 19 March Fava was nominated by Roberto Maroni (elected President of Lombardy in the 2013 Regional election who took place on 24–25 February 2013, Maroni sworn in office on 18 March) as new Regional (Lombardy) minister of Agriculture: according to the Italian electoral law, within 3 months since the proclamation a politician must choose between the Regional politics (as Regional Councilor or as Regional Minister) and the National politics (as MP). Consequently, on 4 June 2013 (one day before the quarterly expiry date) Fava resigned from Montecitorio because he preferred the Regional politics and Fava's seat in Montecitorio passed to the former MP Andrea Angelo Gibelli (that resigned on 5 June 2013 because he preferred the Regional politics and that seat in Montecitorio immediately passed to the Comunal Councilor of San Rocco al Porto Guido Guidesi, for the first time elected MP. Guidesi was officially proclaimed MP on 5 June 2013). Fava in 1993–2001 was the Mayor of Pomponesco. With the end of Maroni's Presidency, Fava in March 2018 left his office as Regional (Lombardy) minister of Agriculture.

=== Candidate as Federal Secretary of Lega Nord (2017) ===
Fava obtained national notoriety in Italy because he participated at the 2017 primary election of Lega Nord against Matteo Salvini, the incumbent Federal Secretary of Lega Nord: in the run-up of the 2017 leadership election Salvini was focused on becoming the Leader of the centre-right and, possibly, changing the LN's name by ditching "North".

While Paolo Grimoldi (the regional secretary of Lega Nord for Lombardy) chose not to run and Roberto Maroni (the President of Lombardy Region) maintained his neutrality, Fava (Lombard minister of Agriculture in the old social-democratic tradition) announced his bid aiming at representing the federalist/autonomist/separatist wings of the party. Gianluca Pini, President of Lega Nord Romagna, supported Fava: note that Fava's best results in this LN primary (over 40% but under 45%) are only in Romagna.

Fava, who is anti-prohibition of drugs, pro-civil unions for same-sex couples, pro-Atlanticism, and anti-National Front ("[it] is one of the most centralist and conservative blocs in Europe, what has it to do with us?"), recalled an old LN activist saying "let's hurry up in making Padania, that I want to return voting the left" and added "this was the League and it has to be like this anew". Salvini accused Fava to be "too friend of Berlusconi" and specially of "wanting to submit the LN to Forza Italia".

This is a closed primary where all ordinary and militant members with at least 12 months of membership are reserved for 31 December 2016 and they also have the right to sign in support of "secretarial nominations", which they need a minimum of 1000 signatures to be able to apply. Each candidate must be registered for at least 10 years as ordinary and militant members of LN: the only candidates for the post of Federal Secretary are those of Matteo Salvini and Giovanni Fava, both of which exceed the minimum of 1000 signatures (precisely 6925 for Salvini and 1025 for Fava). Umberto Bossi, the founder of LN, support Giovanni Fava and his plan of approach to Forza Italia and Silvio Berlusconi from which the Lega Nord has gradually gone away (in favor of Giorgia Meloni's Brothers of Italy) during Salvini's leadership since the previous primary election of December 2013. Salvini was re-elected Federal Secretary by a landslide (82.7%) on 14 May. His re-election was ratified by the party's federal congress on 21 May in Parma.
