= 2017 Lega Nord leadership election =

- 14 May 2017
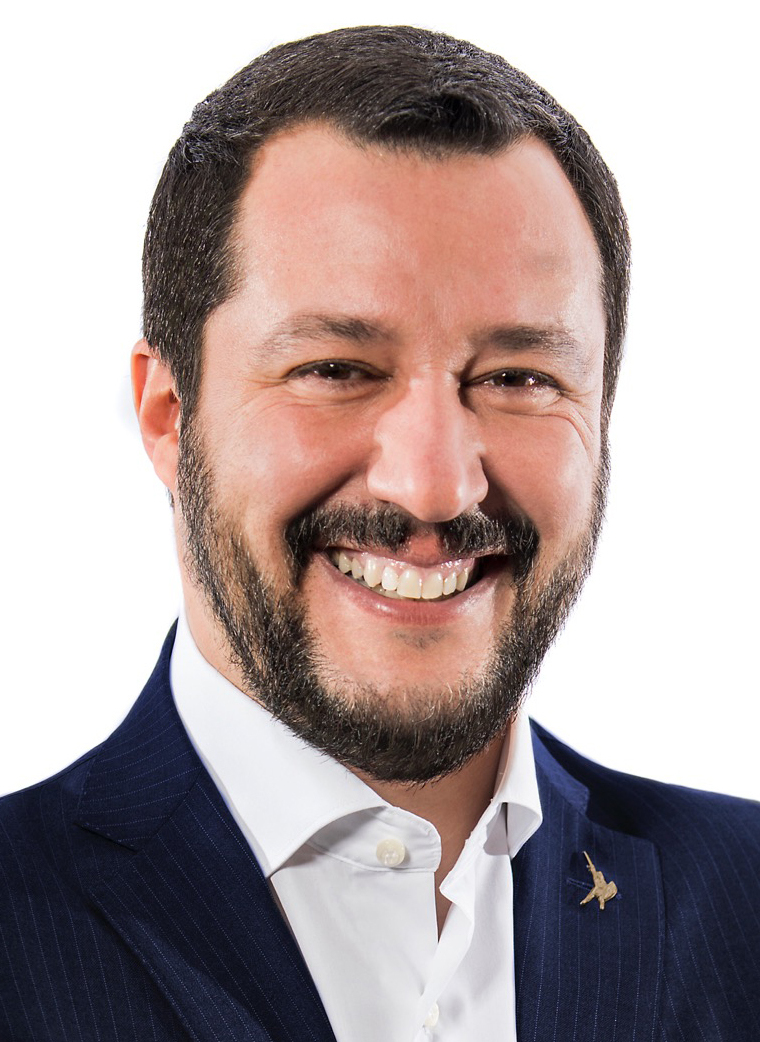

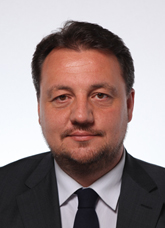
| Nominee | Matteo Salvini | Gianni Fava |
| Popular vote | 6,636 | 1,388 |
| Percentage | 82.7% | 17.3% |
Federal Secretary before election
Matteo Salvini
Elected Federal Secretary
Matteo Salvini

The 2017 Lega Nord leadership election took place on 14 May 2017.

== Background and race ==
Under the leadership of Matteo Salvini, who was elected in the 2013 leadership election, the party embraced a very critical view of the European Union, especially of the Euro, which he described a "crime against mankind". Ahead of 2014 European Parliament election, Salvini started to cooperate with Marine Le Pen, leader of the French National Front, and Geert Wilders, leader of the Dutch Party for Freedom. All this was criticised by LN founder Umberto Bossi, who re-called his left-wing roots, and Mayor of Verona Flavio Tosi, who represented the party's centrist wing and defended the Euro. In March 2015, after a long struggle with Luca Zaia and Salvini, Tosi was ejected from the party. In May 2015 Zaia was re-elected President of Veneto for a second term in the regional election with a landslide.

In the run-up of the 2017 leadership election Salvini was focused on becoming the leader of the centre-right and, possibly, changing the LN's name by ditching "North". Paolo Grimoldi, the regional secretary of Lega Nord for Lombardy, chose not to run (and Roberto Maroni, the President of Lombardy Region, maintained his neutrality), but Gianni Fava, Lombard minister of Agriculture in the old social-democratic tradition, announced his bid aiming at representing the federalist/autonomist/separatist wings of the party. Gianluca Pini, President of Lega Nord Romagna, supported Fava: note that Fava's best results in this LN primary (over 40% but under 45%) are only in Romagna.

Gianni Fava, who is anti-prohibition of drugs, pro-civil unions for same-sex couples, pro-Atlanticism, and anti-National Front ("[it] is one of the most centralist and conservative blocs in Europe, what has it to do with us?"), recalled an old LN activist saying "let's hurry up in making Padania, that I want to return voting the left" and added "this was the League and it has to be like this anew". Salvini accused Fava to be "too friend of Berlusconi" and specially of "wanting to submit the LN to Forza Italia".

This is a closed primary where all ordinary and militant members with at least 12 months of membership are reserved for 31 December 2016 and they also have the right to sign in support of secretarial nominations, which they need a minimum of 1000 signatures to be able to apply. Each candidate must be registered for at least 10 years as ordinary and militant members of LN: the only candidates for the post of Federal Secretary are those of Matteo Salvini and Gianni Fava, both of which exceed the minimum of 1000 signatures (precisely 6925 for Salvini and 1025 for Fava). Umberto Bossi, the founder of LN, support Gianni Fava and his plan of approach to Forza Italia and Silvio Berlusconi from which the LN has gradually gone away (in favor of Giorgia Meloni's Brothers of Italy) during Salvini's leadership since the previous primary election of December 2013. On 14 May Salvini was re-elected secretary by a landslide. His re-election was ratified by the party's federal congress on 21 May in Parma.

== Candidates ==
| Portrait | Name | Most recent position | Refs |
|---|---|---|---|
| | Matteo Salvini (1973– ) | Federal Secretary of Lega Nord (2013–incumbent) Other positions: Federal Secretary of Lega Lombarda (2012–2013); Member of the European Parliament (2009–incumbent; 2004–2006); Member of the Chamber of Deputies (2008–2009) | |
| | Gianni Fava (1968– ) | Member of the Chamber of Deputies (2006–2018) Other positions: Lombardy Assessor of Agriculture, Mayor of Pomponesco | |

== Primary election ==
| Candidate | Votes | % |
|---|---|---|
| Matteo Salvini | 6,636 | 82.70% |
| Gianni Fava | 1,388 | 17.30% |
| Total | 8,024 | 100.0 |

Popular vote
| Salvini | 82.70% |
| Fava | 17.30% |

=== Results by regions ===
| Region | Salvini | Fava |
|---|---|---|
| Aosta Valley | 100.0 | 0.0 |
| Emilia-Romagna | 68.0 | 33.0 |
| Friuli-Venezia Giulia | 87.0 | 13.0 |
| Liguria | 95.0 | 5.0 |
| Lombardy | 78.0 | 22.0 |
| Marche | 83.0 | 17.0 |
| Piedmont | 87.0 | 13.0 |
| Tuscany | 83.0 | 17.0 |
| Trentino-Alto Adige/Südtirol | 75.0 | 25.0 |
| Umbria | 95.0 | 5.0 |
| Veneto | 91.0 | 9.0 |
