= Minister for Institutional Reforms =

- Ministro per le Riforme Istituzionali

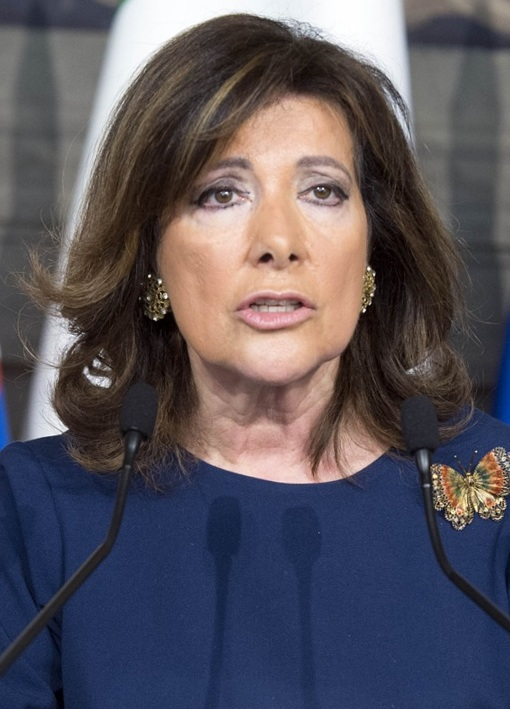
- Incumbent; Elisabetta Casellati since October 22, 2022
- Department for Institutional Reforms
- Member of: Council of Ministers
- Seat: Rome
- Appointer: The president of Italy
- Term length: No fixed term
- Formation: April 13, 1988; 38 years ago
- First holder: Antonio Maccanico
- Website: www.riformeistituzionali.gov.it

The minister for institutional reforms (Italian: ministro per le riforme istituzionali) is one of the positions in the Italian government.

The current minister is Elisabetta Casellati, a member of the Forza Italia, who has held the office since 22 October 2022 in the cabinet of Giorgia Meloni.

== List of ministers ==
Parties

- 1988–1994:
  - Italian Republican Party
  - Christian Democracy
  - Independent
- 1994–present
  - Italian People's Party
  - Lega Nord
  - The Democrats
  - The People of Freedom / Forza Italia
  - Democratic Party
  - New Centre-Right
  - Independent

Coalitions

- 1988–1994:
  - Pentapartito / Quadripartito
  - Mixed coalition
- 1994–present:
  - Centre-right coalition
  - Centre-left coalition
  - Mixed coalition

Portrait	Name (Born–Died)	Term of office			Party	Government	Ref.
Portrait	Name (Born–Died)	Took office	Left office	Time in office	Party	Government	Ref.
Minister for Regional Affairs and Institutional Problems
	Antonio Maccanico (1924–2013)	13 April 1988	12 April 1991	2 years, 364 days	Italian Republican Party	De Mita; Andreotti VI	
Minister of Institutional Reforms and Regional Affairs
	Mino Martinazzoli (1931–2011)	12 April 1991	28 June 1992	1 year, 77 days	Christian Democracy	Andreotti VII	
Office not in use		1992–1993				Amato I	
Minister for Electoral and Institutional Reforms
	Leopoldo Elia (1925–2008)	28 April 1993	10 May 1994	1 year, 12 days	Christian Democracy / Italian People's Party	Ciampi	
Minister for Institutional Reforms
	Francesco Speroni (1946– )	10 May 1994	17 January 1995	252 days	Lega Nord	Berlusconi I	
	Giovanni Motzo (1930–2002)	17 January 1995	17 May 1996	1 year, 121 days	Independent	Dini	
Office not in use		1996–1998				Prodi I	
	Giuliano Amato (1938– )	21 October 1998	13 May 1999	204 days	Independent	D'Alema I	
	Antonio Maccanico (1924–2013)	21 June 1999	11 June 2001	1 year, 355 days	The Democrats	D'Alema I·II; Amato II	
Minister for Institutional Reforms and Devolution
	Umberto Bossi (1941–2026)	11 June 2001	19 July 2004	3 years, 38 days	Lega Nord	Berlusconi II	
	Roberto Calderoli (1956– )	20 July 2004	18 February 2006	1 year, 213 days	Lega Nord	Berlusconi II·III	
Minister for Institutional Reforms and Parliamentary Relations
	Vannino Chiti (1947– )	17 May 2006	8 May 2008	1 year, 357 days	Democrats of the Left / Democratic Party	Prodi II	
Minister for Federal Reforms
	Umberto Bossi (1941–2026)	8 May 2008	16 November 2011	3 years, 192 days	Lega Nord	Berlusconi IV	
Office not in use		2011–2013				Monti	
Minister for Constitutional Reforms
	Gaetano Quagliariello (1960– )	28 April 2013	22 February 2014	300 days	The People of Freedom / New Centre-Right	Letta	
Minister for Constitutional Reforms and Parliamentary Relations
	Maria Elena Boschi (1981– )	22 February 2014	12 December 2016	2 years, 294 days	Democratic Party	Renzi	
Office not in use		2016–2022				Gentiloni	
Office not in use		2016–2022				Conte I·II; Draghi	
Minister for Institutional Reforms and Regulatory Simplification
	Elisabetta Casellati (1946– )	22 October 2022	Incumbent	3 years, 320 days	Forza Italia	Meloni	
