= Elisa Isoardi =

Italian television host

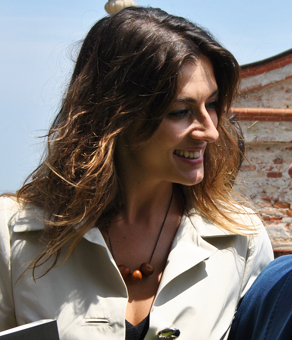
- Isoardi in 2013
- Born: 27 December 1982 (age 43); Cuneo, Piedmont, Italy
- Occupation: Television host
- Years active: 2000–present
- Partner: Matteo Salvini (2015–2018)

Elisa Isoardi (born 27 December 1982) is an Italian television host. Isoardi currently hosts the daytime game show La prova del cuoco on Rai 1. She was born in Cuneo and grew up in Caraglio, in the Province of Cuneo.

== Career ==
Isoardi first came into the spotlight in Italy when she was awarded the title of "Miss Cinema" in the 2000 Miss Italia pageant. She entered the competition as the regional winner of the Miss Valle d'Aosta title.

Isoardi later achieved success on Italian television hosting the early afternoon show Effetto sabato from 2007 to 2008 on Rai 1. She replaced Antonella Clerici on the television game show La prova del cuoco (the Italian version of Ready Steady Cook) from December 2008 to June 2010, a position that she returned to from 2018 to 2020.

== Personal life ==
In 2015 she started dating politician and Lega Nord's leader Matteo Salvini, who became Deputy Prime Minister three years later. Isoardi announced their split in November 2018 via an Instagram post.
