= Wojciech Bakun =

Polish politician and deputy

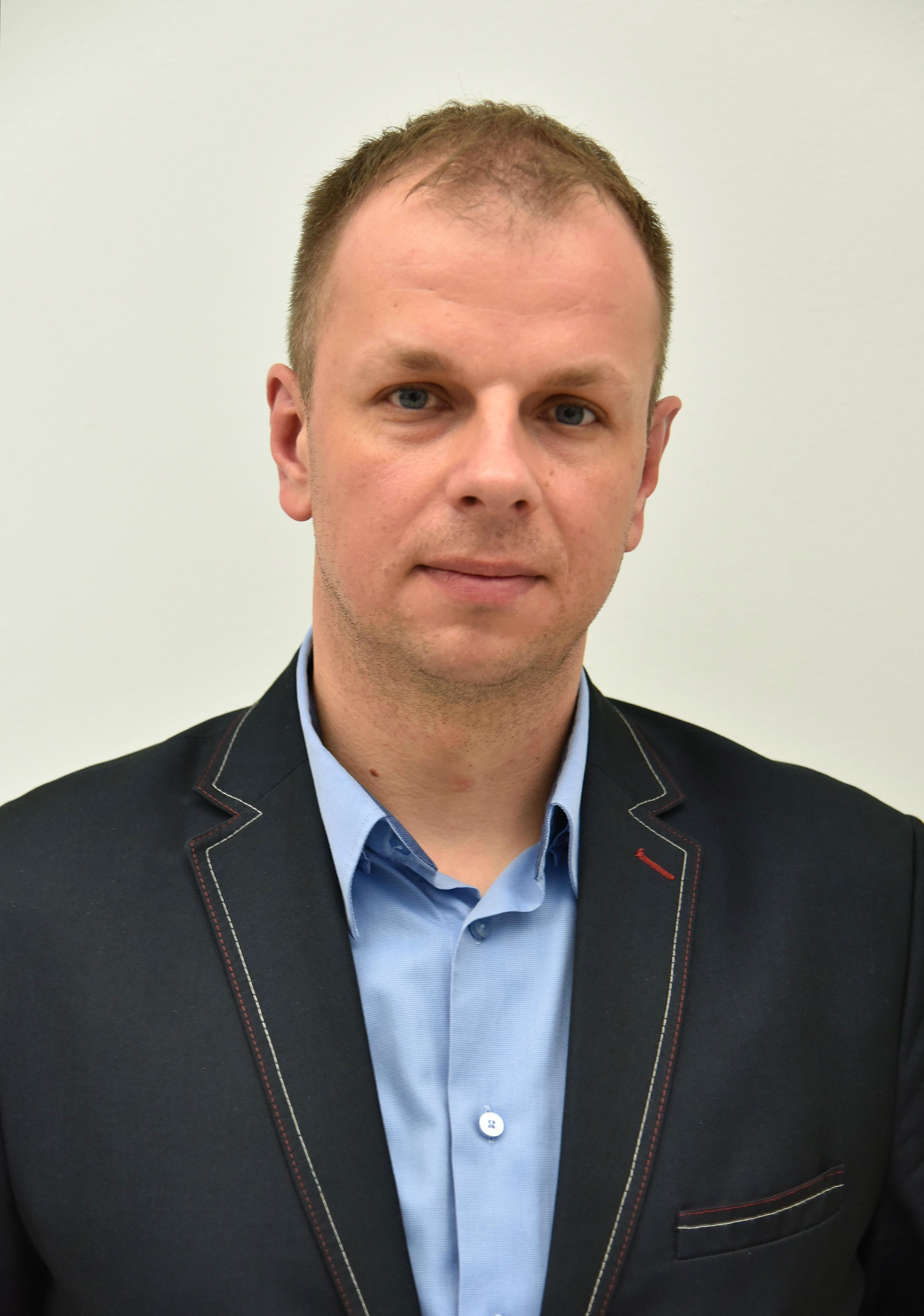
- Wojciech Bakun 2016.
- Born: January 29, 1981 (age 45)
- Occupations: Politician, entrepreneur

Wojciech Antoni Bakun (born 29 January 1981) is a Polish politician, entrepreneur and local government official, Member of the Sejm for the 8th term, President of Przemyśl since 2018.

== Early career ==
Bakun was born in Przemyśl. An IT technician by education, he graduated from a post-secondary vocational college in 2002, and later studied law at the WSPiA Rzeszów School of Higher Education. After working as a sales representative and database administrator in a family business, he started running his own business with his wife.

He became a member of the disciplinary court of the Association for the New Constitution Kukiz'15 and secretary of the Merchant Association. In the parliamentary elections in 2015, Bakun ran for the Sejm in the Krosno constituency from the first place on the list of the Kukiz'15 election committee appointed by Paweł Kukiz. He won the seat of an MP in the 8th term, receiving 9406 votes.

From 2016, he was a member of the Parliamentary Team for the Safety of the Immunization Program for Children and Adults.

In the 2018 local government elections, he ran for the president of Przemyśl, obtaining 41.49% of the vote (the best result) and going to the second round. He received 74.84% of the votes, thus winning the election.

He took office after being sworn in on 22 November 2018.

After the 2022 Russian invasion of Ukraine in February 2022, Bakun declared support for Poland hosting Ukrainian refugees. During a visit by former Italian interior minister Matteo Salvini to Przemyśl and the Polish-Ukrainian border, Bakun criticized Salvini over his former statements in support of Russian president Vladimir Putin, stating: "Look at what the person you call a friend did to the people who come across the border in numbers of 50,000 a day." Bakun also held up a t-shirt with an image of Putin, similar to one that Salvini had worn on previous occasions, and suggested they go visit a nearby refugee center with Salvini wearing the t-shirt.
