= Antonio Maccanico =

Italian politician and civil servant (1924–2013)

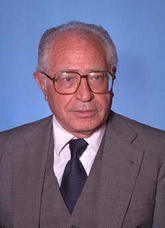

Minister for Institutional Reforms
- In office 21 June 1999 – 11 June 2001
- Prime Minister: Massimo D'Alema; Giuliano Amato
- Preceded by: Giuliano Amato
- Succeeded by: Umberto Bossi

Minister of Post and Communications
- In office 17 May 1996 – 21 October 1998
- Prime Minister: Romano Prodi
- Preceded by: Giovanni Motzo
- Succeeded by: Salvatore Cardinale

Minister of Regional Affairs
- In office 13 April 1988 – 13 April 1991
- Prime Minister: Ciriaco De Mita; Giulio Andreotti
- Preceded by: Aristide Gunnella
- Succeeded by: Francesco D'Onofrio

Member of the Senate of the Republic
- In office 28 April 2006 – 28 April 2008
- Constituency: Campania
- In office 23 April 1992 – 14 April 1994
- Constituency: Lombardy

Member of the Chamber of Deputies
- In office 9 May 1996 – 27 April 2006
- Constituency: Avellino

Personal details
- Born: 4 August 1924 Avellino, Italy
- Died: 23 April 2013 (aged 88) Rome, Italy
- Party: List: PdA 1942–1947 PCI (1947–1956) PRI (1956–1994) None (1994–1996) UD (1996–1999) Dem (1999–2002) DL (2002–2007) PD (2007–2008)
- Education: Pisa University

Antonio Maccanico (4 August 1924 – 23 April 2013) was an Italian constitutional specialist and politician who served in various capacities in the Italian Parliament and federal administrations of Italy. He was the general secretary of the Quirinal Palace from 1978 to 1987, and was several times minister and undersecretary to the Prime Minister under Carlo Azeglio Ciampi. He was also president of Mediobanca.

== Early life and education ==
Maccanico was born on 4 August 1924 in Avellino. He graduated in law at the University of Pisa in 1946.

== Career ==
Maccanico began his career at the Chamber of Deputies as a referendary in June 1947 during the Constituent Assembly of Italy period. He worked in different commissions in the lower house of the Italian Parliament, and was a member of the Action Party. He later joined the Italian Communist Party, which he left in 1956 after the Soviet invasion of Hungary. In 1962, Maccanico was appointed Head of the Legislative Office of the Ministry of the Budget by the Italian Republican Party leader Ugo La Malfa, who had taken office as minister. He returned to the Chamber of Deputies and in 1964 became Director of the Commission Service. He was appointed Deputy General Secretary of the Chamber of Deputies in 1972 and General Secretary on 22 April 1976. As the author of several publications in the field of public finance and institutional and political problems, Maccanico was the representative of Italy in the Brussels ad hoc committee for the preparation of the European convention for direct elections to the European Parliament, a committee of which he had been president from September–December 1975.

In the 1970s and 1980s, Maccanico served for nine years as the general secretary in the office of the then Italian presidents Sandro Pertini and Francesco Cossiga. He was the president of Italian investment bank Mediobanca from 1987 to 1988; it was privatized during his term. He succeeded Enrico Cuccia in the aforementioned post. Maccanico was appointed Minister for Regional Affairs and Institutional Problems on 13 April 1988, and was in office until 13 April 1991; ultimately, no significant institutional reforms were developed during his tenure. He was elected a member of the Senate of the Republic on 6 April 1992 for the Italian Republican Party and served in the post until 1994. He was the undersecretary of state of the presidency of the cabinet in the Ciampi government from 29 April 1993 to 9 May 1994.

Following the resignation of Prime Minister Lamberto Dini in January 1996, Maccanico was tasked with forming a government on 1 February 1996. Maccanico strongly argued that all parties should agree on the required reforms before the formation of the government. To overcome the television problem, Telecom Italia presented an ambitious project for cabling Italian cities that would have allowed cable transmission, thus overcoming the reservations expressed by the Constitutional Court of Italy on over-the-air television broadcasts; the government attempt failed due to the almost complete opposition of the opposing parliamentary groups. As he was unable to form a majority, Maccanico renounced the mandate on 14 February, and thus Italian president Oscar Luigi Scalfaro dissolved the Italian Parliament on 16 February. Maccanico was elected deputy on 21 April 1996, being part of Romano Prodi's list, from the constituency of Campania 2.

On 18 May 1996, Maccanico was appointed minister of post and communications to the cabinet led by Romano Prodi. In the cabinet, he was part of the Democratic Union, to which he had established earlier in 1996. He was the father of law no. 249 dated 31 July 1997 that was the basis of Italy's communications authority. It is also called the Maccanico Law. His tenure lasted until 1998. In 1999, alongside Prodi, he was one of the founders of The Democrats. In June 1999, he was named Minister for Institutional Reforms to the first D'Alema government, replacing Giuliano Amato in the post, and Maccanico kept the charge even in the successive governments until 2001.

In 2001, Maccanico was elected to the Chamber of Deputies. He also oversaw the merger of The Democrats to form The Daisy. In 2006, Maccanico was elected for the fourth time to the Italian Parliament with The Daisy in Campania. During the legislature, he was the drafter of the Lodo Maccanico, the rule that provided for the non-prosecution and suspension of ongoing trials for the five highest offices of the state (the president of the Italian Republic and the presidents of the Chamber, the Senate, the Constitutional Court, and the Council of Ministers). Following a maxi-amendment from the centre-right coalition majority, first signed by Renato Schifani, Maccanico disavowed the text of the law, which then became known as the Lodo Schifani.

In 2007, Maccanico described Italy's transformation from a proportional republic to a majoritarian one. While he said that this was not perfect, he praised the stability and alternative governments (Christian Democracy had been the ruling party during the First Italian Republic, while the Second Italian Republic saw a rotation between centre-left coalition and centre-right coalition governments) it brought. He called the Italian electoral law of 2005, which returned to a more proportional system, a "monstrous electoral law". In 2008, he did not run for re-election as a deputy.

== Death and legacy ==
Maccanico died in a clinic in Rome on 23 April 2013; he was 88. In 2014, the diaries of Maccanico edited by the historian Paolo Soddu were published under the title Con Pertini al Quirinale. Diari 1978–1985.

== Electoral history ==
Election	House	Constituency	Party	Votes	Result
1992	Senate of the Republic	Lombardy – Milan I	PRI	9,618	Elected
1996	Chamber of Deputies	Avellino	Ulivo	43,045	Elected
2001	Chamber of Deputies	Avellino	Ulivo	36,935	Elected
2006	Senate of the Republic	Campania	DL	– (Note: Elected in a closed list proportional representation system.)	Elected
