= List of Federal Secretaries of Lega Nord =

The Federal Secretary of Lega Nord is the chairman of the Lega Nord, a political party in Italy.

== List ==
N°	Portrait	Name (Born–Died)	Term of office		Election
1		Umberto Bossi (1941–2026)	4 December 1989	5 April 2012	None
2		Roberto Maroni (1955–2022)	1 July 2012	15 December 2013	None
3		Matteo Salvini (born 1973)	15 December 2013	Incumbent	2013 2017

== Tenure ==
Rank	Secretary	Time in office
1	Umberto Bossi	22 years, 123 days
2	Matteo Salvini	12 years, 95 days
3	Roberto Maroni	1 year, 167 days
