= 2013 Lega Nord leadership election =

- 7 December 2013
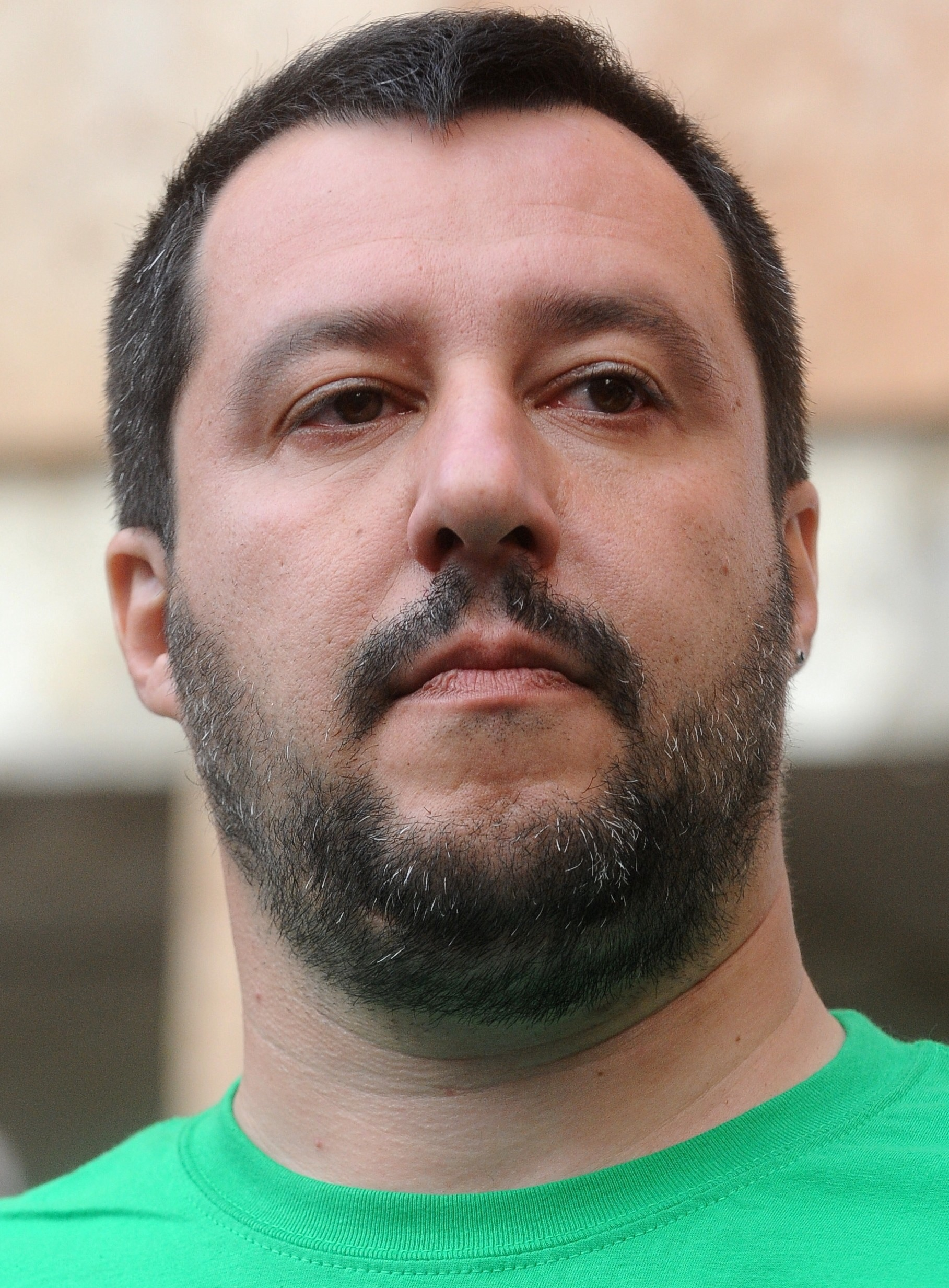

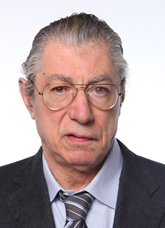
Nominee	Matteo Salvini	Umberto Bossi
Party	Lega Nord	Lega Nord
Popular vote	8,162	1,833
Percentage	81.7%	18.3%
Federal Secretary before election
Roberto Maroni
Elected Federal Secretary
Matteo Salvini

The 2013 Lega Nord leadership election took place in November–December 2013.

== Background and race ==
In September 2013 Roberto Maroni, who had been secretary of the party for just about a year, announced he would soon step down from the party's leadership.

A federal congress was scheduled for mid December and five candidates filed their bid to become secretary: Umberto Bossi (the party's founder and former leader), Matteo Salvini, Giacomo Stucchi, Manes Bernardini and Roberto Stefanazzi. Of these, only Bossi and Salvini gathered the 1,000 necessary signatures by party members to take part to a closed "primary" (open only to a selected public of party members), and Salvini collected four times the signatures gathered by Bossi.

On 7 December Salvini trounced Bossi with 82% of the vote in the "primary". His election was ratified by the party's federal congress on 15 December.

== Main candidates ==
Portrait	Name	Most recent position
	Matteo Salvini (1973– )	Federal Secretary of Lega Lombarda (2012–incumbent) Other positions: Member of the European Parliament (2009–incumbent; 2004–2006); Member of the Chamber of Deputies (2008–2009)
	Umberto Bossi (1941– )	Federal Secretary of Lega Nord (1989–2012) Other positions: Minister of Federal Reforms (2008–2011); Minister for Institutional Reforms and Devolution (2001–2004); Member of the Chamber of Deputies (2008–incumbent; 1992–2004); Member of the Senate of the Republic (1987–1992)

== First round ==
Candidate	Status on 30 November
Matteo Salvini	Admitted to primary election
Umberto Bossi	Admitted to primary election
Giacomo Stucchi	Retired
Manes Bernardini	Retired
Roberto Stefanazzi	Retired

Source: La Stampa

== Primary election ==
Candidate	Votes	%
Matteo Salvini	8,162	81.7
Umberto Bossi	1,833	18.3
Total valid votes	9,995	100.0
Invalid votes	121	1.2
Blank votes	105	1.0
Total	10,221	100.0

Turnout: 60.0% Source: Adnkronos

Popular vote
Salvini	81.7%
Bossi	18.3%

=== Results by Regions ===
Region	Salvini	Bossi
Aosta Valley	80.0	20.0
Emilia-Romagna	66.0	34.0
Friuli-Venezia Giulia	90.0	10.0
Liguria	91.0	9.0
Lombardy	79.0	21.0
Marche	86.0	14.0
Piedmont	83.0	17.0
Tuscany	89.0	11.0
Trentino-Alto Adige/Südtirol	72.0	28.0
Umbria	67.0	33.0
Veneto	84.0	16.0
