= Matteo Salvini =

Italian politician (born 1973)

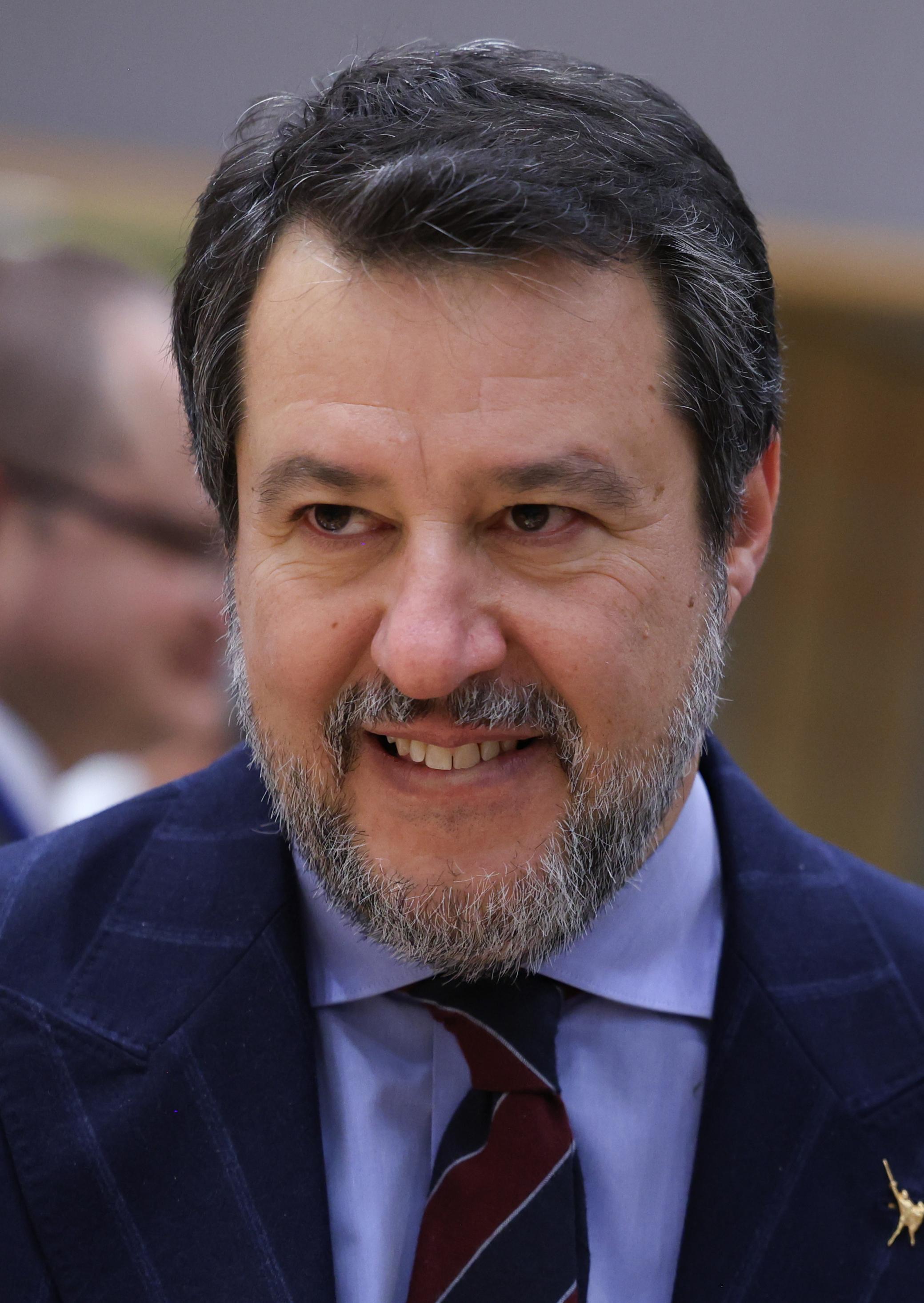
- Salvini in 2025

Deputy Prime Minister of Italy
- Incumbent
- Assumed office 22 October 2022 Serving with Antonio Tajani
- Prime Minister: Giorgia Meloni
- Preceded by: Himself and Luigi Di Maio (2019)
- In office 1 June 2018 – 5 September 2019 Serving with Luigi Di Maio
- Prime Minister: Giuseppe Conte
- Preceded by: Angelino Alfano (2014)
- Succeeded by: Antonio Tajani and himself (2022)

Minister of Infrastructure and Transport
- Incumbent
- Assumed office 22 October 2022
- Prime Minister: Giorgia Meloni
- Preceded by: Enrico Giovannini

Minister of the Interior
- In office 1 June 2018 – 5 September 2019
- Prime Minister: Giuseppe Conte
- Preceded by: Marco Minniti
- Succeeded by: Luciana Lamorgese

Federal Secretary of the League
- Incumbent
- Assumed office 15 December 2013
- Preceded by: Roberto Maroni

Member of the Senate of the Republic
- Incumbent
- Assumed office 23 March 2018
- Constituency: Lazio (2018–2019); Calabria (2019–present)

Member of the European Parliament
- In office 14 July 2009 – 22 March 2018
- Constituency: North-West Italy
- In office 20 July 2004 – 7 November 2006
- Constituency: North-West Italy

Member of the Chamber of Deputies
- In office 6 March 2013 – 15 March 2013
- Constituency: Lombardy 1
- In office 29 April 2008 – 13 July 2009
- Constituency: Lombardy 1

Personal details
- Born: 9 March 1973 (age 53) Milan, Italy
- Party: Lega
- Other political affiliations: Lega Nord; Us with Salvini (2014–2017)
- Spouse: Fabrizia Ieluzzi (m. 2001; div. 2010)
- Domestic partner(s): Giulia Martinelli (2011–2014); Elisa Isoardi (2015–2018); Francesca Verdini (2019–present)
- Children: 2
- Education: University of Milan (attended)
- Website: salvinipremier.it

Matteo Salvini (Italian pronunciation: [matˈtɛːo salˈviːni]; born 9 March 1973) is an Italian politician serving as Deputy Prime Minister of Italy and Minister of Infrastructure and Transport since 2022. He has been Federal Secretary of Italy's Lega party since December 2013 and an Italian senator since March 2018. Salvini represented Northwestern Italy in the European Parliament from 2004 to 2018.

Salvini has been a hardline Eurosceptic politician, holding a starkly critical view of the European Union, especially of the euro. He opposes illegal immigration into Italy and the EU as well as the EU's management of asylum seekers. He is also considered one of the main leaders of the populist wave in Europe during the 2010s and a member of the neo-nationalist movement, which is a right-wing ideology that emphasizes de-globalization, nativist and protectionist stances.

During his first stint as deputy prime minister, many international political commentators and newspapers, such as The Guardian, The New York Times, the Financial Times, The Economist, and The Huffington Post, characterized him as a strongman and the most influential politician in Italy after the 2018 elections. Salvini condemned the 2022 Russian invasion of Ukraine. He had previously praised Russia's president Vladimir Putin, describing Putin in 2019 as "the best politician and statesman in the world".

== Early life ==
Matteo Salvini was born in Milan in 1973, the son of a business executive father and a homemaker mother. In 1985, at the age of 12, he took part in the game show Doppio slalom (the Italian version of Blockbusters), hosted by Corrado Tedeschi on Canale 5. And in 1993, at the age of 20, he participated on Il pranzo è servito, hosted by Davide Mengacci, which was broadcast by Rete 4.

Salvini studied at the Classical Lyceum "Alessandro Manzoni" in Milan. He later attended the University of Milan, where he first studied political science before switching to history. However, he interrupted his studies to start his political career and never graduated.

Salvini has said that, as a teenager, he used to visit the left-wing self-managed social centre Leoncavallo.

== Early political career ==
In 1990, Salvini became a member of the Lega Nord, the regionalist and separatist movement founded by Umberto Bossi in 1989. He was an active member of the Young Padanians Movement, LN's youth faction, of which he became city coordinator for Milan in 1992 and city secretary in 1997. In the same year, he started working as journalist for La Padania, the official newspaper of Lega Nord. In 1999 he also worked on Lega's radio broadcaster Radio Padania Libera and since July 2003 he has been registered as a journalist on the list of Italian professional journalists.

In 1993 he was elected in the City Council of Milan, a post that he would hold until 2012. While in 1997 he participated in the Padanian elections and was elected within the list Comunisti Padani (Padanian Communists), which gained 5 seats out of 210. In the following year, he was elected provincial secretary of the League for Milan.

In 1999, during an official visit of Italian President Carlo Azeglio Ciampi in Milan, Salvini refused to shake his hand, stating that Ciampi did not represent him.

=== European Parliament and local leader ===
Salvini was elected with 14,000 votes a Member of the European Parliament (MEP) for the North-West region in 2004 and participated in the European Parliament as a part of the Non-Inscrits. During the legislature he selected Franco Bossi, brother of the party's secretary Umberto, as his parliamentary assistant.

In 2006, he lost his office as a member of the European Parliament and was replaced by Gian Paolo Gobbo. Salvini was then re-elected city councillor in Milan, in the municipal election of that year, with over 3,000 votes. In the same year, he became deputy secretary of the Lombard League, along with Marco Reguzzoni, and the party leader in the city council.

He sat on the European Parliament's Committee on Culture and Education, and was a substitute for the Committee on the Environment, Public Health and Food Safety and a member of the delegation to the EU–Chile Joint Parliamentary Committee. He stood down from the European Parliament in November 2006.

Salvini ran in the 2008 general election and was elected in the Chamber of Deputies for the constituency Lombardy 1. However he resigned on 13 July 2009, after being elected once again in the European Parliament in the June election. In the Parliament, he sat in the Europe of Freedom and Democracy Group.

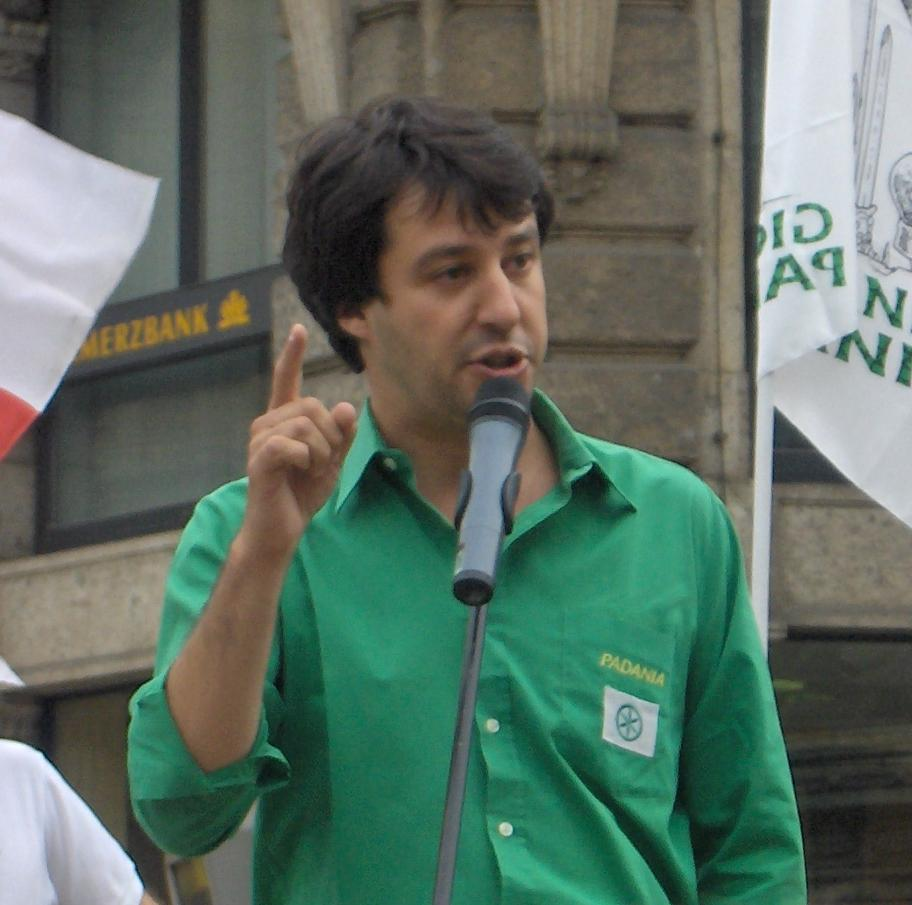
Salvini during a Young Padanians rally in 2006

After he was re-elected in 2009 as an MEP, he sat on the Committee on the Internal Market and Consumer Protection and was a member of the delegation for relations with India, and the delegation for relations with the Korean peninsula. He was a substitute on the Committee on International Trade and the Delegation for relations with South Africa.

On 2 June 2012, Salvini became the federal secretary of the Lombard League, defeating Cesarino Monti with 403 votes against 129. Following the election, on 12 October he decided to leave the office of group leader and city councilor after 19 years. Salvini was later elected deputy in the 2013 general election, but he renounced his mandate on the first day of the legislature, and was replaced by Marco Rondini; Salvini maintained the position of MEP.

After the 2014 European election, in which he was re-elected, he returned to the Non-Inscrits. In June 2015, he was part of the creation of a new group, the Europe of Nations and Freedom, which also included parties such as the French National Front and the Dutch Party for Freedom; he was also the vice-president of the Italian delegation.

== Federal Secretary of Lega Nord ==
In September 2013, Roberto Maroni, secretary of LN and Salvini's mentor, announced he would soon leave the party's leadership. After a few weeks, Salvini announced his candidacy for the first Lega's leadership election. A congress was scheduled for mid-December and in accordance with the new rules set for the election five candidates filed their bid to become secretary: Umberto Bossi, Giacomo Stucchi, Manes Bernardini, Roberto Stefanazzi and Salvini. Of these, only Bossi and Salvini gathered the 1,000 necessary signatures by party members to take part in the internal "primary", and Salvini collected four times the signatures gathered by Bossi.

On 7 December 2013, Salvini, who counted on the support of Roberto Maroni and most of the party's senior figures (including Flavio Tosi, who had renounced a bid of his own), defeated Umberto Bossi with 82% of the vote in the "primary". A week later, his election was ratified by the party's federal congress in Turin. Under Salvini, the party embraced a strongly critical view of the European Union, especially of the euro, which he described a "crime against humanity". Ahead of the 2014 European Parliament election, Salvini started to cooperate with Marine Le Pen, leader of the French National Front, and Geert Wilders, leader of the Dutch Party for Freedom. These moves were criticised by Bossi, who called attention to Salvini's left-wing roots, and Tosi, who represented the party's pro-European wing and defended the euro.

Salvini in 2010

In April 2014, Salvini presented the party's logo for the European Parliament election, with Basta Euro ('No more Euro') replacing Padania, to emphasize the party's Euroscepticism and desire to exit from the Eurozone. The party included in its slates candidates from other anti-euro and/or autonomist movements (hence Autonomie, 'Autonomies'), notably comprising The Freedomites, a right-wing populist and separatist party active in South Tyrol (whose symbol was also included).

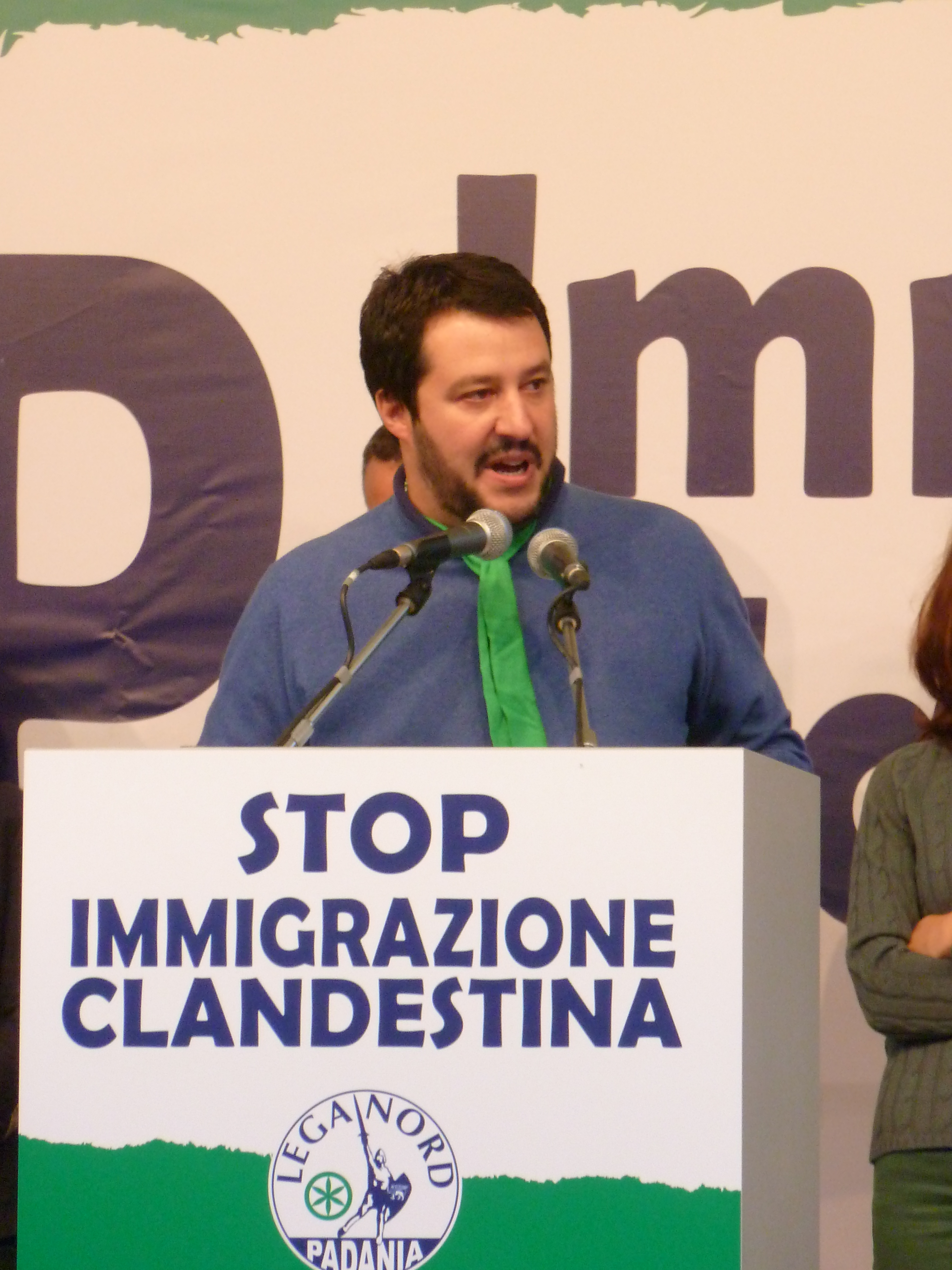
Matteo Salvini speaks during a Lega Nord rally in 2013.

In the European Parliament election, the party obtained 6.2% of the vote and 5 MEPs. The result was far worse than the previous EP election in 2009 (a fall of 4.0%), but better than that of the 2013 general election (a gain of 2.1%). The LN were third with 15.2% in Veneto (although Tosi obtained many more votes than Salvini, a fact that demonstrated Tosi's popular support and that the party was far from united on the anti-euro stance), ahead of Forza Italia (FI) and the other parties having emerged from the defunct People of Freedom, and fourth in Lombardy with 14.6%. Despite the party having lost Piedmont to the Democrats, after Roberto Cota had been forced to resign, Salvini was triumphant, with the success of Massimo Bitonci in being elected mayor of Padua, a Democratic stronghold, adding to the successes.

The party's federal congress, summoned in Padua in July, approved Salvini's political stance, especially a plan for the introduction of a flat tax and the creation of a sister party in central-southern Italy and the Isles. In November the Emilia-Romagna regional election represented a major step for Salvini's "national project": the Lega Nord, which won 19.4% of the vote, was the region's second-largest party, and far ahead of Forza Italia, helping paving the way for the Lega Nord to become the dominant centre-right party. In December the sister party for southern Italy, Us with Salvini (NcS), was launched.

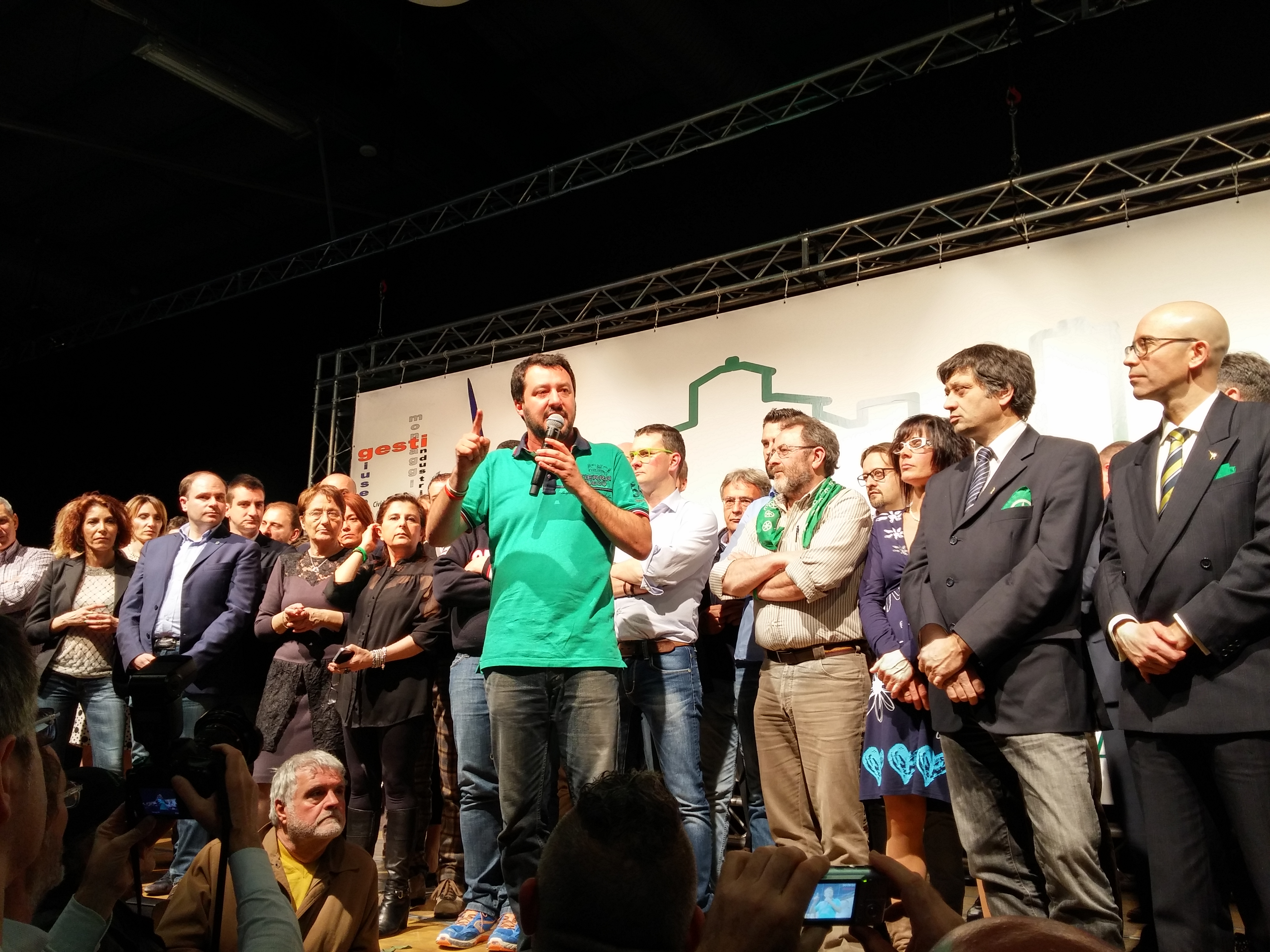
Matteo Salvini in Bergamo, 2015

The party's growing popularity among voters was reflected also in a constant rise in opinion polls. A December 2014 Ipsos poll showed that Salvini's approval rating had increased by from 28% to 33%, "cementing his position as a rising political force in Italy".

On 28 February 2015, Salvini led a rally in Rome protesting against illegal immigration.

In March 2015, after a long struggle between the two main Venetian party leaders Flavio Tosi and Luca Zaia, backed by Salvini, over the formation of the slates for the upcoming regional election in Veneto, Tosi was removed as national secretary of Liga Veneta and ejected from the federal party altogether. Despite this in-fighting, the 2015 regional elections were another success for the LN, especially in Veneto, where Luca Zaia was re-elected with 50.1% of the vote and the combined score of the party's and Zaia's personal lists was 40.9%. The party also came second in Liguria with 22.3%, second in Tuscany with 16.2%, third in the Marche with 13.0% and third in Umbria with 14.0%. The LN had never polled so high in those five regions before.

After the 2016 local elections, in which the party ran below expectations in Lombardy (while doing well in Veneto as well as Emilia-Romagna and Tuscany) and the NcS performed badly, Salvini's political stance came under pressure from Bossi, Maroni, and especially the recently elected leader of Lega Lombarda, Paolo Grimoldi, who criticized the party's right-wing turn and its focus on the south, while reclaiming the federalist and autonomist identity of the LN.

In the run-up of the 2017 leadership election, Salvini focused on becoming the leader of the centre-right and, possibly, changing the Northern League's name by ditching "Northern". Paolo Grimoldi, leader of Lega Lombarda, chose not to run against Salvini (and Maroni maintained his neutrality), but Gianni Fava, Lombard regional minister of Agriculture in the old social-democratic tradition, announced his bid aiming at representing the federalist / autonomist / separatist wings of the party. Fava, who was anti-prohibition of drugs, pro-civil unions for same-sex couples, pro-Atlanticism, and, like Bossi, anti-National Front ("[it] is one of the most centralist and conservative blocs in Europe, what does it have to do with us?"), recalled an old activist saying, "let's hurry up in making Padania, then I want to return voting the left", and added, "this was the League and it has to be like this anew."

=== 2018 general election ===
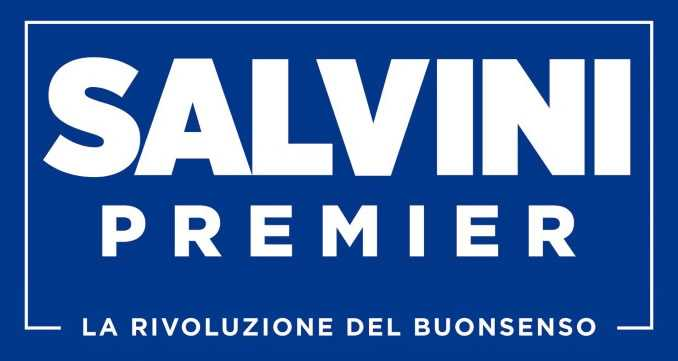
The logo chosen by Salvini for the 2018 electoral campaign, inspired by the campaign logo of Donald Trump's 2016 campaign for President

On 21 December 2017, Salvini presented the new electoral logo of the Northern League for the 2018 general election; for the first time since its foundation the party ran in all the constituencies of the country, using a logo without the word "Northern".

The League obtained a resounding success, becoming the third largest party in Italy with 17.4% of the vote. The ticket won most of its votes in the north (including 32.2% in Veneto, 28.0% in Lombardy, 26.7% in Trentino, 25.8% in Friuli-Venezia Giulia and 22.6% in Piedmont), but also made inroads in the rest of the country, especially in central Italy (notably 20.2% in Umbria), the upper part of the south (13.8% in Abruzzo) and Sardinia (10.8%). The League became the party with the most votes in the centre-right coalition and thus Salvini was de facto chosen as coalition's leader; the centre-right won a plurality of seats in the Chamber of Deputies and in the Senate; however, no political group or party won an outright majority, resulting in a hung parliament.

After the election results were known, both Salvini and the head of the Five Star Movement, Luigi Di Maio, stated that they deserved to receive from President Sergio Mattarella the mandate to form a new cabinet, because they led, respectively, the largest party and the largest coalition. On 6 March, Salvini repeated his campaign message that his party would refuse any coalition with the Five Star Movement.

On 24 March, the centre-right coalition and the Five Star Movement agreed on the election of presidents of the Houses of Parliament, Roberto Fico of M5S for the Chamber and Maria Elisabetta Alberti Casellati of Forza Italia for the Senate.

On 7 May, President Mattarella held a third round of government formation talks, after which he formally confirmed the lack of any possible majority. The Five Star Movement was rejecting an alliance with the entire centre-right coalition, the Democratic Party was rejecting an alliance with both the Five Star Movement and the centre-right coalition, and the League was refusing to enter a government with the Five Star Movement without Silvio Berlusconi's Forza Italia party (yet whose presence in the government was explicitly vetoed by Luigi Di Maio).

Consequently, Mattarella announced his intention to soon appoint a "neutral government" (irrespective of M5S and the League's refusal to support such an option). This would take over from the Gentiloni Cabinet, which was considered unable to lead Italy into a second consecutive election as it was representing a majority from a past legislature, and offering an early election in July (on what would be the first ever summer general election in Italy) as a realistic option to take into consideration due to the deadlock situation. The Lega and M5S agreed to hold new elections on 8 July, an option that was however rejected by all other parties.

On 9 May, after a day of rumours, both Salvini and Di Maio officially requested that President Mattarella give them 24 more hours to strike a government agreement between the two parties. That evening, Silvio Berlusconi publicly announced Forza Italia would not support a Five Star Movement–League government on a vote of confidence, but he would still maintain the centre-right alliance nonetheless, thus opening the door to a possible majority government between the two parties.

On 13 May, the Five Star Movement and the League reached an agreement in principle on a government programme, likely clearing the way for the formation of a governing coalition between the two parties, but could not find an agreement regarding the members of a government cabinet, most importantly the prime minister. Five Star Movement and League leaders met with Mattarella on 14 May to guide the formation of a new government.

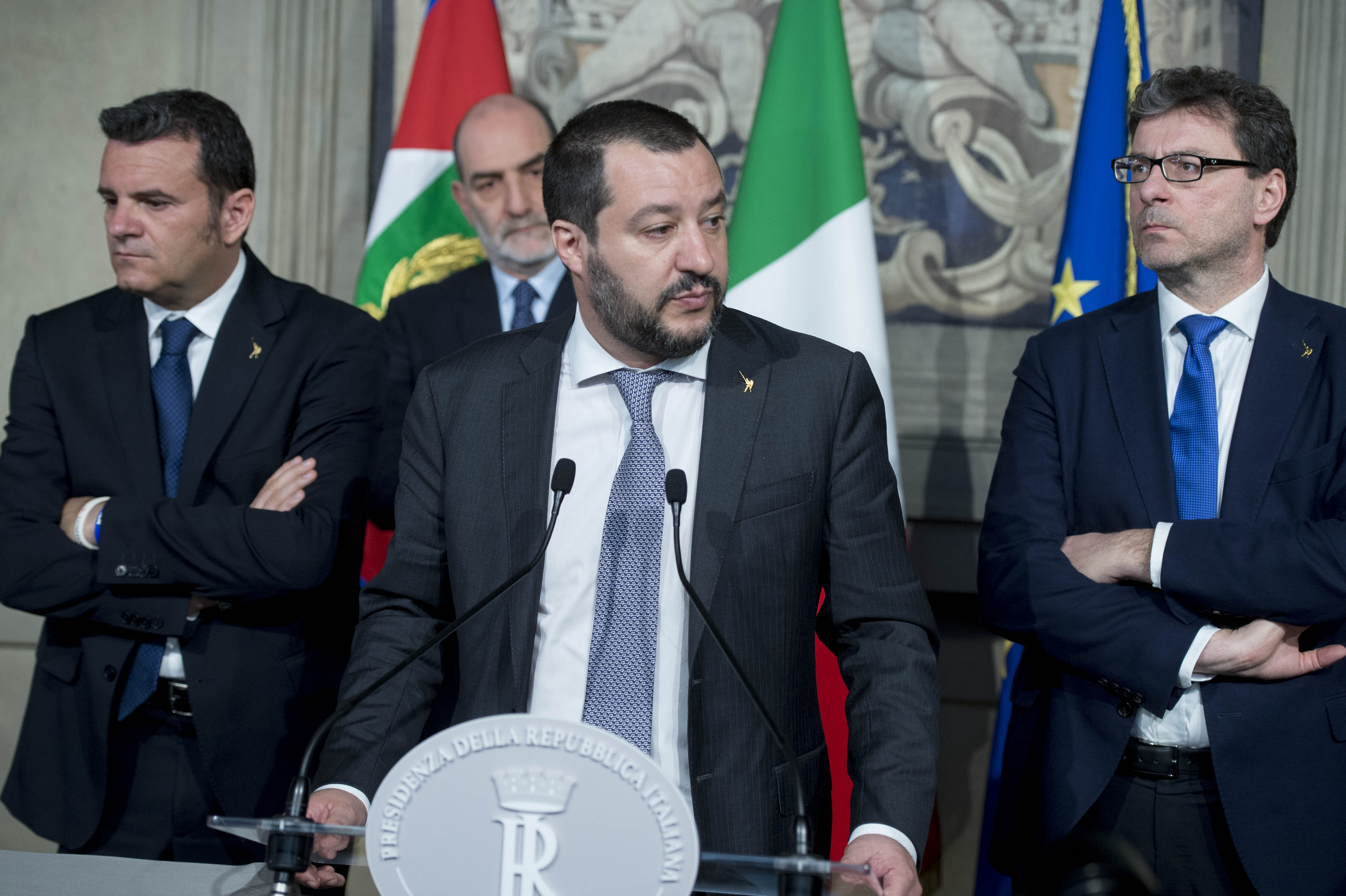
Salvini with League's delegation at the Quirinal Palace in April 2018

On 21 May 2018, Di Maio and Salvini proposed the professor of private law Giuseppe Conte for the role of Prime Minister in the 2018 Italian government, despite reports in the Italian press suggesting that President Mattarella still had significant reservations about the direction of the new government. On 23 May 2018, Conte was invited to the Quirinal Palace to receive the presidential mandate to form a new cabinet. In the traditional statement after the appointment, Conte said that he would be the "defense lawyer of the Italian people".

However, on 27 May, Conte renounced his office due to conflicts between Salvini and President Mattarella. In fact, Salvini proposed the university professor Paolo Savona as Minister of Economy and Finance, but Mattarella strongly opposed him. In his speech after Conte's resignation, Mattarella declared that the two parties wanted to bring Italy out of the Eurozone, and as the guarantor of the Italian Constitution and the country's interest and stability, he could not allow this. Moreover, in the same speech he affirmed that a possible abandonment of the euro had never been declared during the electoral campaign.

On the following day, Mattarella gave Carlo Cottarelli, a former director of the International Monetary Fund, the task of forming a new government. On 28 May 2018, the Democratic Party (PD) announced that it would abstain from voting for Cottarelli, while the Five Star Movement and the centre-right parties Forza Italia (FI), Brothers of Italy (FdI) and the League announced their vote against.

Cottarelli was expected to submit his list of ministers for approval to President Mattarella on 29 May. However, on 29 and 30 May he held only informal consultations with the President, waiting for the formation of a "political government". Meanwhile, Matteo Salvini and Luigi Di Maio announced their willingness to restart the negotiations to form a political government; Giorgia Meloni, leader of FdI, gave her support to the initiative. On 31 May, the Five Star Movement and the Lega Nord reached an agreement on the new government, without Paolo Savona as finance minister (who would become Minister of European Affairs instead), and with Giuseppe Conte at its head.

=== Party's developments ===
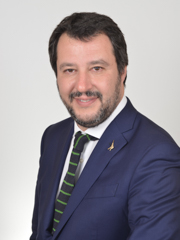
Official portrait of Salvini for the Senate

Along with the membership recruitment of the League in the centre-north, in 2018 the party launched a parallel membership recruitment in the centre-south under the name of "League for Salvini Premier" (LSP), practically supplanting the Us with Salvini movement. The LSP, whose platform had been published in the Gazzetta Ufficiale in December 2017 and had been described as a "parallel party", might eventually replace both the LN and NcS, which would be merged into one. In the meantime, the parties' joint parliamentary groups were named "League–Salvini Premier" in the Chamber and "League–Salvini Premier–Sardinian Action Party" in the Senate. According to news sources, all this is closely related to the seizure by the judiciary of the bank accounts of the LN, after the conviction of Bossi and Belsito for fraud (see Lega Nord#From Bossi to Maroni). If the seizure is confirmed, extended to the bank accounts of the party's national sections or even involves any political entity featuring "Lega" in its name, Salvini might launch a brand-new party and absorb most of the centre-right parties into it.

On 22 February 2019, the Italian magazine L'espresso published an investigation revealing a 3 million euro funding scheme, paid for by Kremlin-linked entities and disguised as a diesel sale. The scheme involved the Russian state-owned oil company Rosneft selling 3 million dollars' worth of diesel to an Italian company. Allegedly, the money was to be transferred from Rosneft to the League through a Russian subsidy of the Italian bank Banca Intesa, in which the League's federal council member Andrea Mascetti is a board member. The money was supposed to fund the coming European election campaign. Italian authorities are currently investigating the matter.

The case obtained renewed attention in July 2019 when BuzzFeed made public the voice recordings and full transcripts of the meeting at the base of the investigation previously published by L'Espresso. The recordings show Salvini's public relations officer Gianluca Savoini meeting with Russian agents close to Vladimir Putin in Moscow, at the same time when Salvini was also in Moscow on an official trip. The meeting centred around providing the Lega with $65 million of illegal funding by the Russian state. The matter was made part of a larger investigation by Italian authorities into the League's finances. The League has an official cooperation deal with Russia's governing party United Russia.

In August 2019, in yet another funding scandal unrelated to the previously mentioned Russia investigations, Italy's highest court sentenced Salvini's party to pay back 49 million euros ($54.83 million) of illegally acquired taxpayer funding to the Italian state. Additionally, Belsito was given prison sentences.

In the summer of 2019, Salvini visited several public beaches to campaign, something unusual for an Italian politician.

In September 2022, numerous League committees expressed their desire to call for a Federal Congress and replace Salvini as Secretary. In October, the party founder Umberto Bossi announced the creation of the "Northern Committee" to regain trust from voters. Many politicians within the party joined this faction, which is openly challenging Salvini.

=== European politics ===
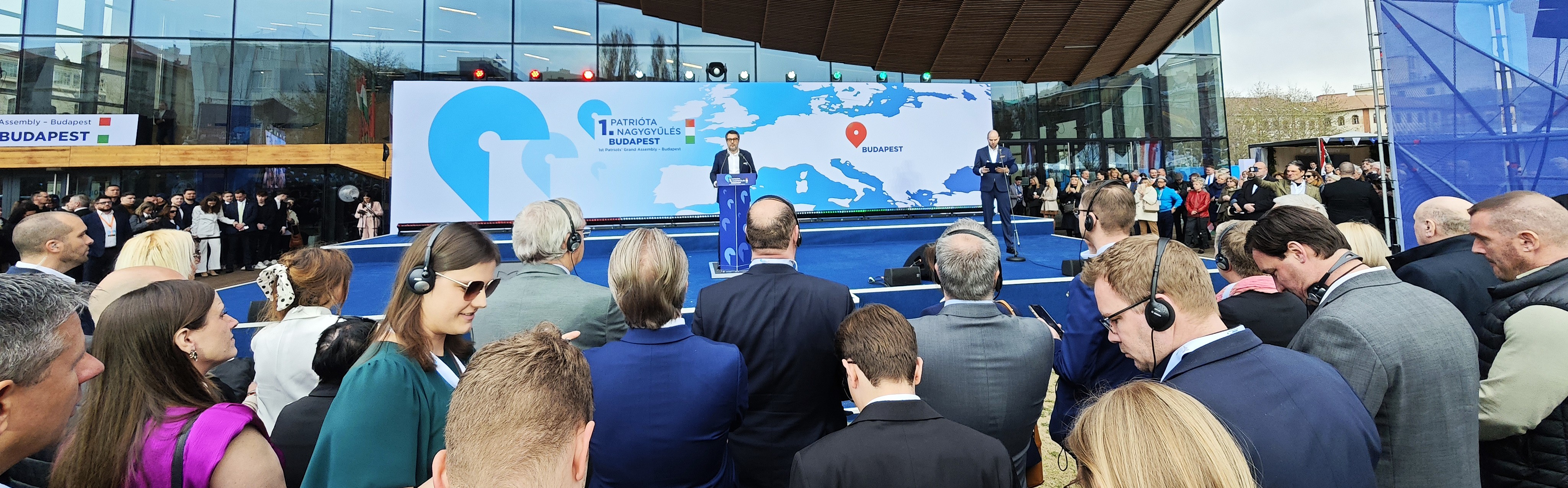
Speaking at 1st Patriots' Grand Assembly - Budapest

Leading up to the 2019 European Parliament election, Salvini worked to create a pan-European alliance of nationalist political parties, and he continued these efforts after the election. He founded the European Alliance of Peoples and Nations on 8 April 2019. In the European elections in Italy, the League won a plurality of votes for the first time in a nationwide election, gaining more than 34% of votes, something which strengthened Salvini's position in Italy. Overall, the European coalition Identity and Democracy, which the Lega is part of, became the fifth-largest group in the newly elected European Parliament.

== Deputy Prime Minister and Interior Minister (2018–2019) ==
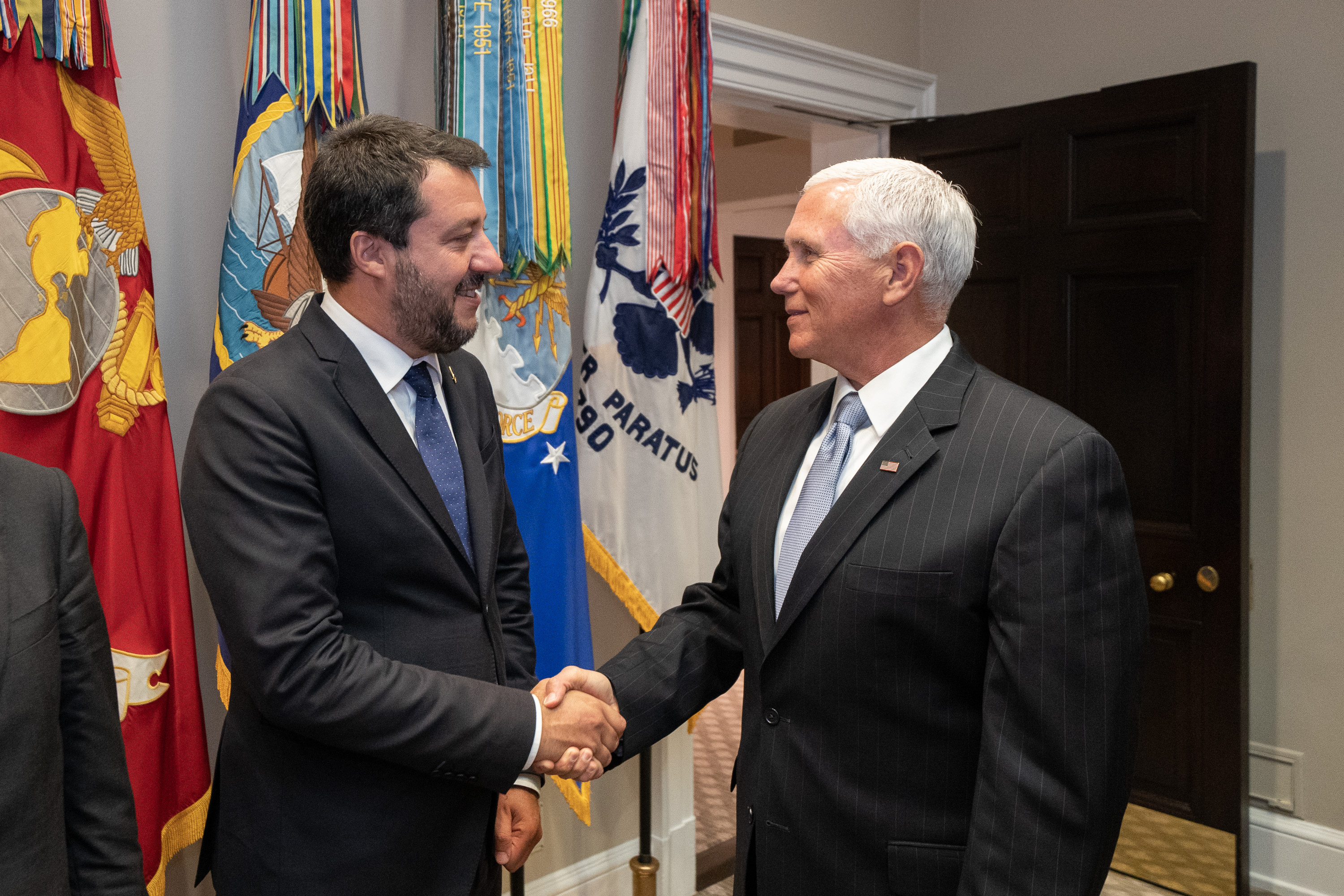
Salvini with U.S. Vice President Mike Pence, in 2019

On 1 June 2018, Matteo Salvini was sworn in as Deputy Prime Minister and Minister of the Interior. He immediately stated that his main aim was to drastically reduce the number of illegal immigrants to Italy. Early in his tenure, numerous media outlets noted that despite Salvini's junior status in the governing coalition, he placed himself in a role even more dominant than Conte and appeared to set Italy's agenda. The media also noted Salvini's "savvy social media presence".

Days after taking his oath, the new Interior Minister created a diplomatic incident with Tunisia, stating that the country sent Italy only convicts who came to Europe with the sole aim of committing crimes. The Tunisian government expressed "profound amazement at the remarks of the Italian interior minister regarding immigration".

On 10 June 2018, Salvini announced the closure of Italian ports, stating that "Everyone in Europe is doing their own business; now Italy is also raising its head. Let's stop the business of illegal immigration." The vessel Aquarius, which is operated jointly by Médecins Sans Frontières and SOS Méditerranée and carried more than 600 migrants, was refused a port of disembarkation by the Italian authorities despite having been told to rescue the migrants by the same co-ordination centre. The Italian authorities told the vessel to ask Malta to provide a disembarkation port, but Malta has also refused. On the following day, the new Spanish Prime Minister Pedro Sánchez accepted the disputed migrant ship.

Dimitris Avramopoulos and Salvini during the G7 in 2019

On 16 June 2018, Matteo Salvini said, "These people should know that Italy no longer wants to be any part of this business of clandestine immigration and they will have to look for other ports to go to", adding "As minister and as a father, I take this action for the benefit of all."

On 18 June 2018, Salvini announced the government would conduct a census of Romani people in Italy for the purpose of deporting all who are not in the country legally. However, this measure was criticized as unconstitutional and was opposed by all the opposition parties and also by some members of the M5S.

On 19 June 2018, Salvini announced his intention to conduct a compulsory racial census of Italians to register Roma people, while stating that Roma who are Italians could "unfortunately" not be deported. This caused an outcry in Italy since racial registration is forbidden by the Italian constitution. Italian Prime Minister Giuseppe Conte forced Salvini to drop the proposal. The opposition leader Matteo Orfini reacted by suggesting Salvini should rather do a "census of racists and fascists".

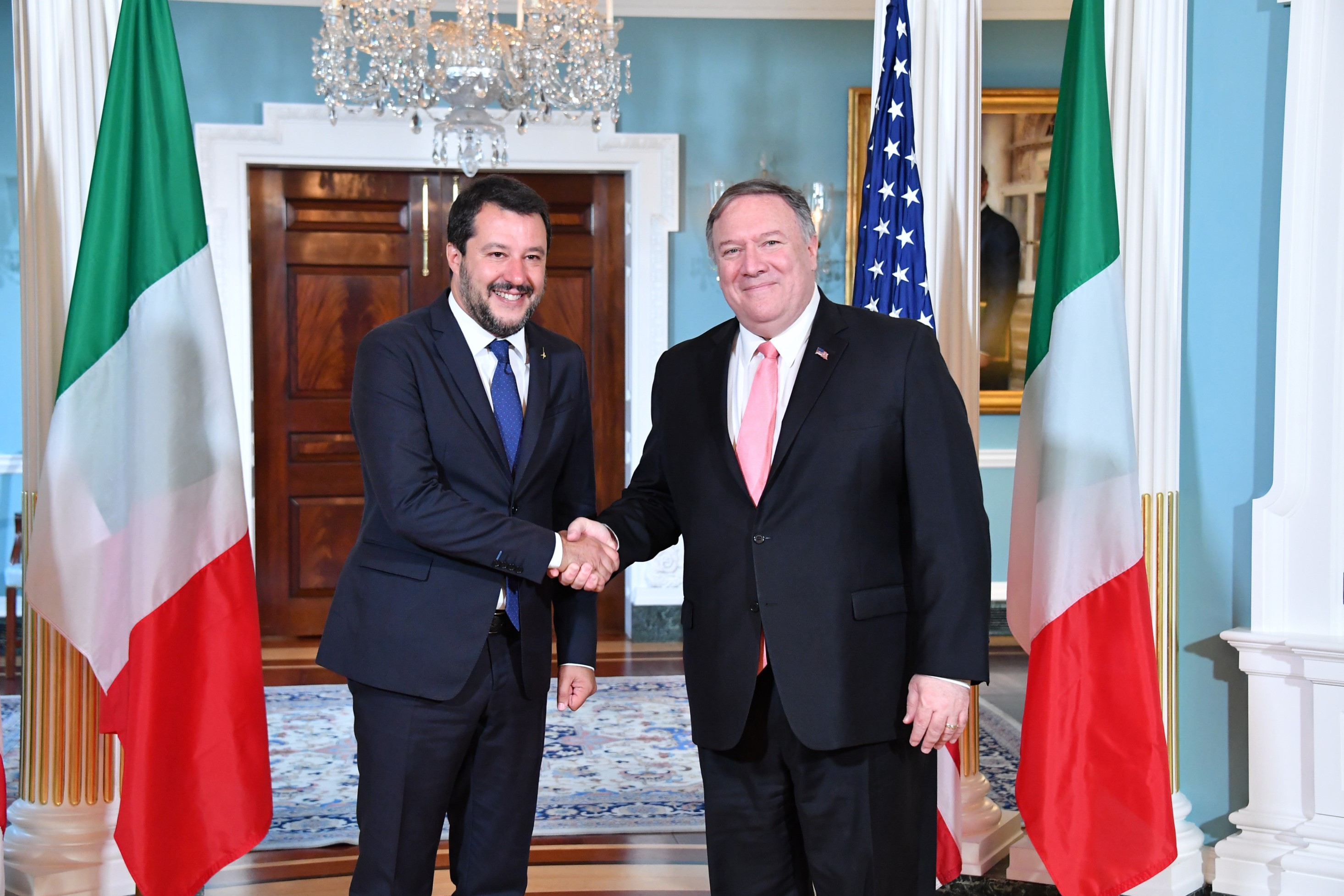
Salvini with U.S. Secretary of State Mike Pompeo, in 2019

On 24 September 2018, the Council of Ministers approved the so-called "Salvini Decree", which contained a series of hardline measures that abolished key forms of protection for migrants and made it easier for them to be deported. The decree also suspended the refugee application process of those who were considered "socially dangerous" or who had been convicted of a crime.

On 12 June 2019, the Sea Watch 3 ship picked up 53 migrants in the Mediterranean off the Libyan coast. Sea Watch 3 rejected an offer to dock at Tripoli, which is considered unsafe by humanitarian organizations, and headed toward Lampedusa. According to a report by the Süddeutsche Zeitung and NGOs, this was the nearest safe harbour per maritime law. On 14 June, Italy closed its ports to migrant rescue ships. Salvini refused to allow the ship to dock until other European nations had agreed to take the migrants. Ten of the migrants, including children, pregnant women, and those who were ill, were allowed to disembark. On 29 June, without authorization, the ship's captain Carola Rackete decided to dock. The motivation for this was that, according to her, the passengers were exhausted. Rackete was arrested by the Italian authorities after docking. Matteo Salvini accused Rackete of trying to sink an Italian patrol boat that was attempting to intercept her, calling the incident an act of war and demanding the Netherlands government intervene. However, on 2 July, Rackete was released from house arrest after a court ruling that she had broken no laws and acted to protect passengers' safety.

In August 2019, Salvini announced a motion of no confidence against Prime Minister Conte, after growing tensions within the majority. Many political analysts saw the no-confidence motion as a move by Salvini to force a call for snap elections where he could become the next Prime Minister of Italy. On 20 August, following the parliamentary debate in which Conte harshly accused Salvini of being a political opportunist who "had triggered the political crisis only to serve his personal interest", the Prime Minister resigned his post to President Mattarella. Salvini's alleged gambit failed, as Conte successfully negotiated the formation of a new cabinet with centre-left Democratic Party.

== Leader of the opposition (2019–2021) ==
After the fall of the first Conte government in August 2019, Salvini led the League into opposition when the Five Star Movement formed a new coalition with the Democratic Party, creating the Conte II Cabinet. From September 2019 onward, Salvini became one of the most vocal critics of the new majority, focusing particularly on immigration and economic policy.

Salvini repeatedly attacked the government’s reversal of his previous “closed ports” approach, arguing that Conte II had returned to a permissive stance on irregular migration. His criticism intensified during high‑profile cases such as the Open Arms standoff, in which Salvini—while no longer interior minister—defended his earlier refusal to allow the disembarkation of 147 migrants in August 2019.

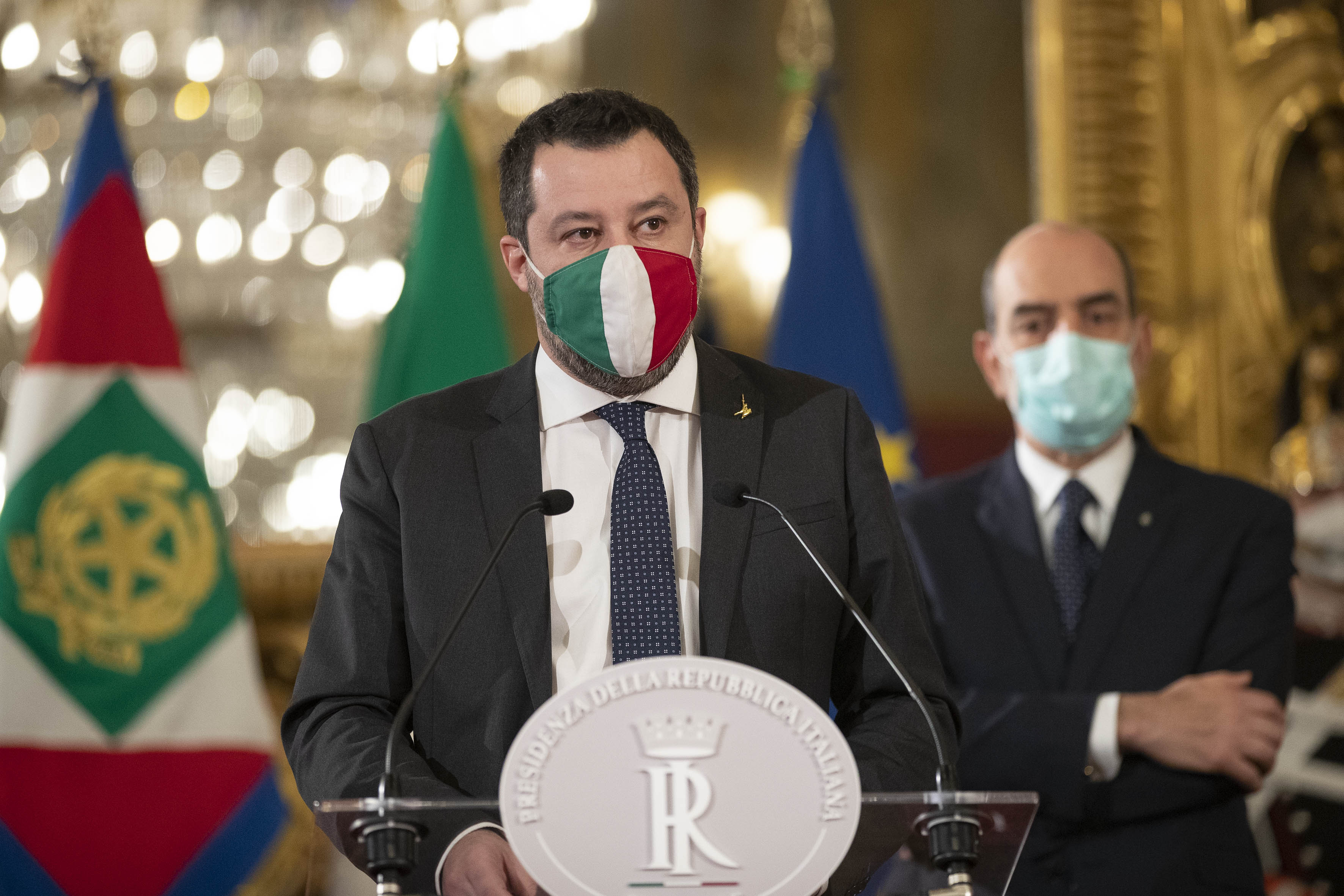
Salvini in 2021, speaking at Quirinale during COVID-19 pandemic

During the COVID‑19 pandemic, Salvini opposed several economic measures proposed by the Conte II Cabinet. He strongly criticized the idea of using the European Stability Mechanism (ESM) as a financial tool to support Italy’s recovery, claiming it would impose excessive conditionality and undermine national sovereignty.

Throughout 2020, Salvini continued to lead rallies and public campaigns against the government, accusing Conte of mismanaging both the health emergency and the economic crisis. He also targeted the Five Star Movement, stating that its leaders had proven unreliable and ineffective.

In January 2021, the Conte II government collapsed following the withdrawal of Italia Viva’s support. Salvini initially called for snap elections but eventually backed the formation of Mario Draghi’s national unity government in February 2021, marking the end of his role as leader of the opposition.

== Draghi government (2021–2022) ==
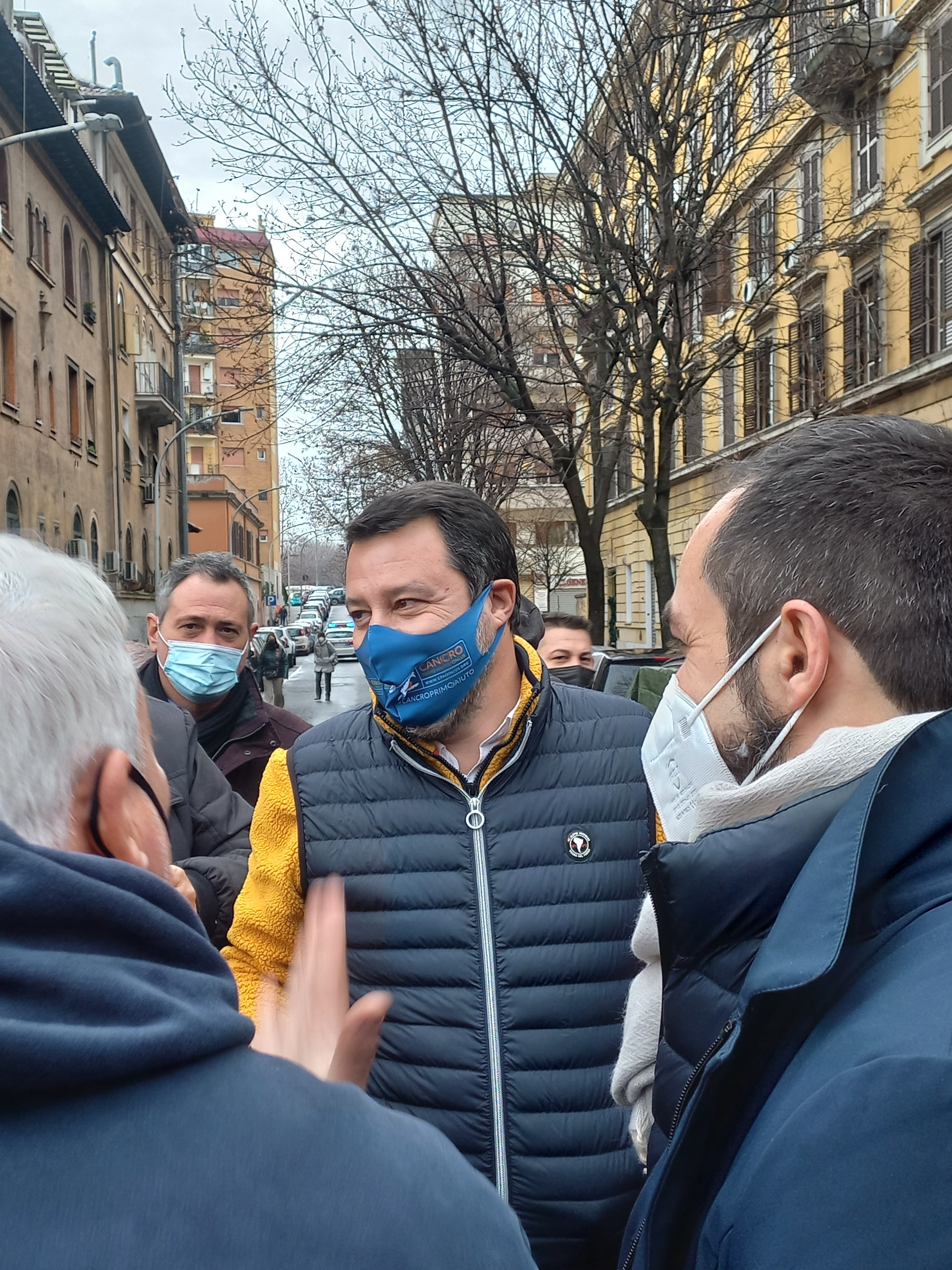
Salvini in 2022

In February 2021, Salvini supported the League joining the national unity government of former European Central Bank president Mario Draghi, together with the Democratic Party, the Five Star Movement, Forza Italia and other minor centre and centre-left parties. This came despite Draghi's vocally pro-Europe stance. The right-wing party Brothers of Italy led by Giorgia Meloni, a partner of Salvini's League in the centre-right coalition, did not give its support to the Draghi government, making it the major opposition party.

On 22 October 2021, Salvini was recorded during a closed-door meeting saying that Giorgia Meloni's Brothers of Italy party "should remain the opposition without breaking our balls". He also admitted defeat in the 2021 Italian local elections, saying that "when you lose disgracefully, lagging by 30 points in some big cities, there is little to celebrate. The centre-right's split in two or three pieces certainly doesn't help." Salvini later claimed to have laughed about the recording in a WhatsApp exchange with Meloni.

== Deputy Prime Minister and Infrastructure Minister (2022–present) ==
Salvini takes on the role of deputy prime minister as appointed by Mattarella (2022).

On 22 October 2022, Giorgia Meloni, the leader of the Brothers of Italy party, was sworn in as Italy's first female prime minister. Lega leader Matteo Salvini became deputy prime minister in her government. The new government, Italy's most right-wing since World War II, also included the centre-right party of ex-prime minister Silvio Berlusconi.

In April 2024, a vote of no confidence was initiated against Salvini and did not pass.

In January 2026, Salvini met British far-right activist Tommy Robinson, claiming the possibility of meeting whoever he wants for "common battles" and to have had an "interesting exchange of ideas", despite criticism from the opposition and the other Deputy Minister Antonio Tajani.

In July 2026, following the Morocco–Spain border incident, Salvini supported calls by Prime Minister Giorgia Meloni to suspend Spain from the EU's visa-free Schengen Area.

== Legal issues ==
Salvini has been targeted in a number of prosecutions surrounding his anti-migration stance as minister, which have all been dismissed.

=== First trial for rejecting migrant ship (dismissed) ===
In February 2020, the Senate formally authorized a trial against Salvini over the Gregoretti Italian coastguard ship case, in which—as Interior Minister at the time—he was accused of kidnapping the rescued migrants by forbidding the ship from docking at the port of Augusta, Sicily. A judge in Catania dismissed the case in May 2021, ruling that no crime had been committed, the incident was not a kidnapping, and that Salvini's six-day block to allow for other EU countries to resettle the migrants was permissible under international law.

=== Second trial for rejecting migrant ship (acquitted) ===
On 30 July 2020, the Senate authorized (by 149 votes against 141) a second trial against Salvini over the Open Arms case, where he was accused of kidnapping migrants after blocking the NGO's rescue ship off the coast of Sicily in August 2019. Salvini defended his actions, stating: "Defending Italy is not a crime. I am proud of it, I would do it again, and I will do it again."

In October 2021, Salvini's second trial on migrant kidnapping charges began in Palermo, Sicily. The American actor Richard Gere was called as a witness by Open Arms, having visited their rescue boat in solidarity with the crew and passengers.

In September 2024, prosecutors requested a six-year prison sentence for Salvini as part of the trial that began in July 2020. His defense was scheduled for 18 October, ahead of the first sentencing. On 20 December 2024, a court in Palermo acquitted Matteo Salvini of charges relating to the illegal detention of 100 migrants, which stemmed from his refusal to allow disembarkation from the humanitarian rescue vessel Open Arms in Lampedusa in 2019.

=== Other cases ===
==== Instigation against Carola Rackete (dismissed) ====
In May 2021, a preliminary investigations judge dismissed a charge of instigation against Salvini for criticizing a German activist who smuggled migrants into Italy. It was alleged that by calling Carola Rackete a criminal, he had instigated violence against her. The investigation found that he was not responsible for the death threats she received from others.

==== Defamation by Carlo De Benedetti (dismissed) ====
Also in May 2021, Salvini accused media magnate Carlo De Benedetti, who had called him an antisemite, of defamation. De Benedetti, who is Jewish, faced trial for his remarks. At the trial, Salvini denied accusations of anti-semitism and described them as defamatory but defended De Benedetti's right to criticize him. The case was dismissed, and the dismissal was upheld by the court of appeals.

== Political views ==
=== Domestic policy ===
Salvini has been described as hard Eurosceptic, holding a starkly critical view of the European Union (EU), especially of the euro, which he once described as a "crime against humanity". Though in October 2012, he said he supported euro for Northern Italy, whilst Southern Italy should not use it: "I in Milan want it, because here we are in Europe. The South, on the other hand, is like Greece and needs another currency. The euro cannot afford it." Salvini is also opposed to illegal immigration into Italy and the EU and the EU's management of asylum seekers. In September 2018, he said: "I'm paid by citizens to help our young people start having children again the way they did a few years ago, and not to uproot the best of the African youth to replace Europeans who are not having children anymore." Salvini also supports remigration, arguing that residence permits and citizenship are acts of trust and that a "points-based residence permit" is necessary, and that it should be revoked in case of crimes, supporting this also for acquired citizenship. His political views have been described as on the far-right, espousing policies such as, among others, collecting census data on and expelling members of the Roma community living illegally in Italy.

On economic issues, he supports a flat tax, tax cuts, fiscal federalism, and protectionism.

On social issues, Salvini opposes same-sex marriage, civil unions and adoption as well as anti-discrimination laws, while he supports the legalisation of brothels. He supports looser gun laws and has pushed that issue as interior minister. Salvini has criticized mandatory vaccination laws.

In 2016, a retweet posted from Salvini's Twitter account called for the shooting of "communist judges". Salvini disowned the retweet, claiming it was posted by a staffer by mistake.

Salvini has been involved in some controversies related to fascism, such as having published a book with a publishing house close to CasaPound, and calling 25 April "a communist-fascist derby" in which he wasn't interested.

=== Foreign policy ===
In foreign policy he opposed Turkey's accession to the European Union, criticized Saudi Arabia for its treatment of women, opposed the international sanctions against Russia taken in 2014, and supported an economic opening to North Korea.

Salvini accused France of "stealing wealth" from former African colonies and generating mass migration to Europe. He also said that "In Libya France has no interest in stabilising the situation because it has oil interests opposite to those of Italy." In the wake of the MV Enrica Lexie case, Salvini called for the expulsion of the Indian Ambassador to Italy and a military operation to extract the two detained Italian marines accused by India of the shooting. He later advocated for Italy purchasing Indian COVID-19 vaccines in March 2021.

Salvini supported the Saudi-led blockade of Qatar before taking office on the grounds that Qatar funded terrorism. Upon becoming Deputy Prime Minister, he also praised Saudi Arabia as "an element of stability and reliability both in bilateral relations and as an actor in the more general Middle Eastern chessboard", and pledged to expand security, economic, commercial and cultural ties with the Kingdom. However, he later reversed his stance, praising Qatar for its "balance" as opposed to Saudi Arabian "extremism" and encouraged Qatari investment in Italy, while opposing Saudi investment proposals in Italy and condemning the decision to host the Supercoppa Italiana final in Saudi Arabia as "disgusting". Salvini has called for stronger Italian ties with Morocco, describing it as "the most stable country in the entire Mediterranean", and criticising an EU resolution that accused Morocco of using migration as political pressure towards Spain.

Salvini has been critical of Iranian policy towards Israel, and expressed scepticism towards the Iran nuclear deal. However, he prefers dialogue over new sanctions. He considers Hezbollah a terrorist organisation, contradicting the official stance of the Italian government. He supported recognition of Jerusalem as the capital of Israel, and in January 2020, he stated his support for moving Italy's embassy in Israel to the city. On 12 December 2018, the Prime Minister of Israel, Benjamin Netanyahu, hailed him as a "great friend of Israel". Following the October 7 attacks in 2023, Salvini accused the Italian branch of Amnesty International of "racism" for refusing to attend a comic and games festival, due to Israel's Embassy in Italy having sponsored the event. Salvini also condemned Erdoğan's labeling of Hamas as "liberators", saying such claims "do not help de-escalation".

Salvini also endorsed the Republican candidate in the 2016 U.S. presidential election, Donald Trump, whom he met in April 2016 in Philadelphia. Multiple news agencies have compared him and his views to those of Trump. In September 2018, Salvini pledged his support for The Movement, a European populist group founded by Trump's former chief strategist, Steve Bannon.

Salvini condemned the 2022 Russian invasion of Ukraine and said he wanted to help Ukrainian refugees and support the countries that accepted them. In the past, however, he praised Russian president Vladimir Putin, and took a picture of himself wearing a T-shirt with Putin's face in Moscow. In response to the criticism, he said he preferred Putin to the Italian President Sergio Mattarella. He was confronted for his past support of Putin by Wojciech Bakun, the mayor of a Polish town Przemyśl, while visiting its refugee center during the 2022 Russian invasion of Ukraine. Salvini accepted Putin's victory in 2024 Russian presidential elections, even if both the United States and the European Union said that the elections were neither free nor fair.

In September 2018, Salvini endorsed conservative nationalist candidate Jair Bolsonaro in the Brazilian presidential election that year. In May 2021, he spoke at the congress of the Portuguese nationalist party Chega, saying that he wanted to unite Europe's populists, conservatives and identitarians against socialists and communists.

== Personal life ==
In 2001, Matteo Salvini married Fabrizia Ieluzzi, a journalist who worked for a private radio station, with whom he had one child in 2003. After his divorce he had a daughter by his domestic partner Giulia Martinelli in 2012. He later became engaged to Elisa Isoardi, a popular TV host. After a relationship of nearly three years, Isoardi announced their split in November 2018 via an Instagram post. As of March 2019, Salvini is engaged to Francesca Verdini, daughter of the politician Denis Verdini. Salvini is nicknamed "The Captain" (Il Capitano) by his supporters.

Matteo Salvini is a Roman Catholic.

A long time resident of Milan, Salvini is an avid supporter of local football club AC Milan.

== Electoral history ==
Election	House	Constituency	Party	Votes	Result
2004	European Parliament	North-West Italy	LN	14,707	Elected
2008	Chamber of Deputies	Lombardy 1	LN	– (Note: Elected in a closed list proportional representation system)	Elected
2009	European Parliament	North-West Italy	LN	69,989	Elected
2013	Senate of the Republic	Lombardy 1	LN	–	Elected
2014	European Parliament	North-West Italy	LN	223,410	Elected
2018	Senate of the Republic	Lazio	Lega	–	Elected
2022	Senate of the Republic	Apulia	Lega	–	Elected

== See also ==
- Sardines movement

== Notes ==
Party political offices
Preceded by Roberto Maroni	Federal Secretary of the League; 2013–present	Incumbent
Political offices
Vacant Title last held by Angelino Alfano	Deputy Prime Minister of Italy; 2018–2019; Served alongside: Luigi Di Maio	Vacant Title next held by Antonio Tajani & Himself
Preceded by Marco Minniti	Minister of the Interior; 2018–2019	Succeeded by Luciana Lamorgese
Vacant Title last held by Himself & Luigi Di Maio	Deputy Prime Minister of Italy; 2022–present Served alongside: Antonio Tajani	Incumbent
Preceded by Enrico Giovannini	Minister of Infrastructure and Transport; 2022–present	Incumbent
