= Umberto Bossi =

Italian politician (1941–2026)

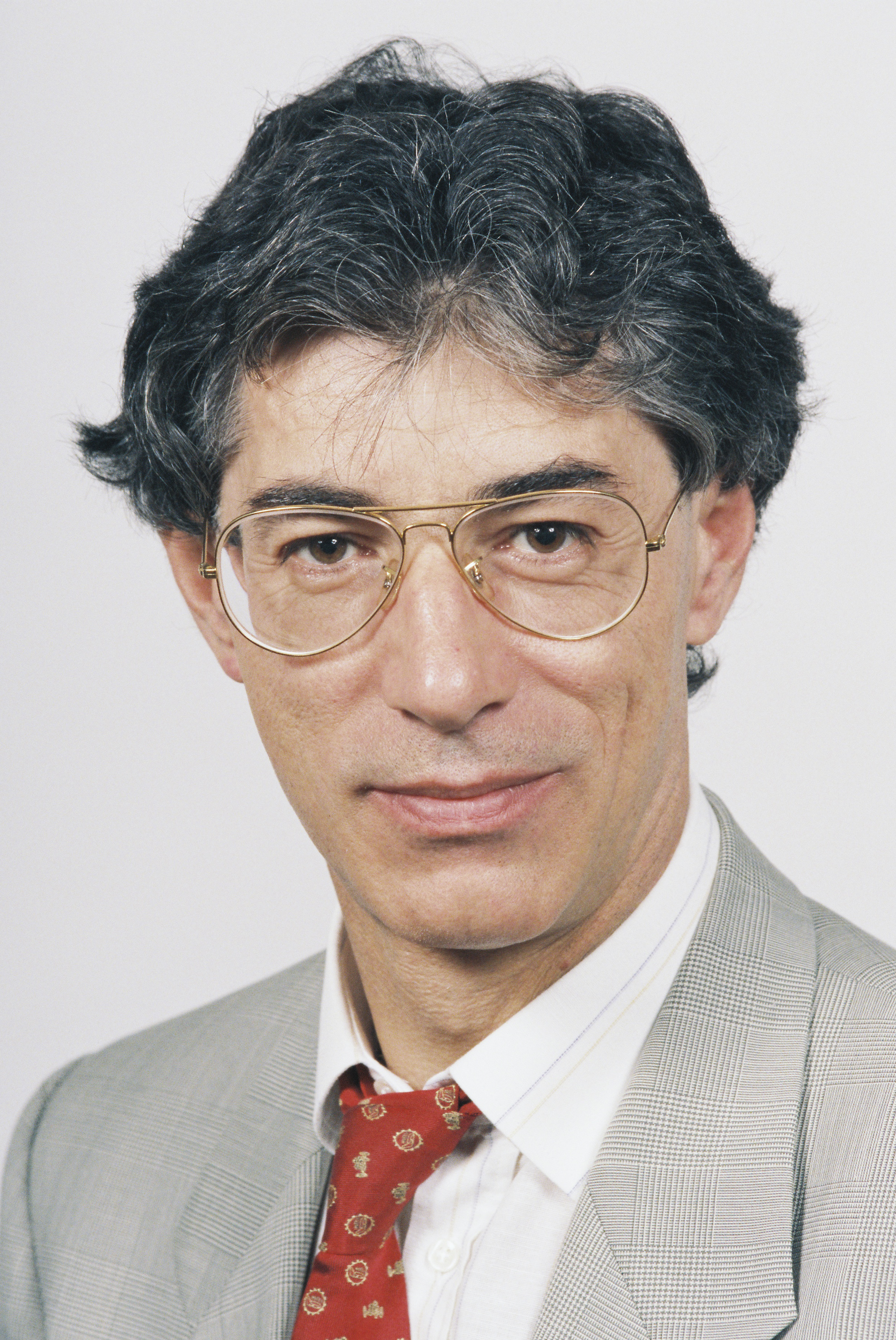
- Official portrait, 1994

President of Northern League
- In office 5 April 2012 – 19 March 2026
- Preceded by: Angelo Alessandri

Federal Secretary of Northern League
- In office 4 December 1989 – 5 April 2012
- Preceded by: Position created
- Succeeded by: Roberto Maroni

Minister for Federal Reforms
- In office 8 May 2008 – 16 November 2011
- Prime Minister: Silvio Berlusconi
- Preceded by: Vannino Chiti

Minister for Institutional Reforms and Devolution
- In office 11 June 2001 – 19 July 2004
- Prime Minister: Silvio Berlusconi
- Preceded by: Antonio Maccanico
- Succeeded by: Roberto Calderoli

Member of the Chamber of Deputies
- In office 13 October 2022 – 19 March 2026
- Constituency: Lombardy
- In office 29 April 2008 – 22 March 2018
- Constituency: Lombardy
- In office 23 April 1992 – 19 July 2004
- Constituency: Milan

Member of the Senate of the Republic
- In office 23 March 2018 – 13 October 2022
- Constituency: Varese
- In office 2 July 1987 – 22 April 1992
- Constituency: Lombardy

Member of the European Parliament
- In office 20 July 2004 – 28 April 2008
- Constituency: North-West Italy
- In office 19 July 1994 – 10 June 2001
- Constituency: North-West Italy

Personal details
- Born: 19 September 1941 Cassano Magnago, Italy
- Died: 19 March 2026 (aged 84) Varese, Italy
- Party: Lega Lombarda; Lega Nord
- Other political affiliations: PCI (1975–1976)
- Spouse: Manuela Marrone
- Children: 4, including Renzo Bossi

Umberto Bossi (19 September 1941 – 19 March 2026) was an Italian politician and leader of Lega Nord (Northern League), a party seeking autonomy for Northern Italy or Padania.

== Early life and education ==
Bossi was born on 19 September 1941 in Cassano Magnago, in the province of Varese, in the Italian region of Lombardy. He graduated from scientific high school (liceo scientifico) and later began studying medicine at the University of Pavia, although he did not get a degree. In 1975, he was a member of the Italian Communist Party (PCI) for a brief period. In February 1979, he met Bruno Salvadori, leader of the Valdostan Union.

== Politics ==
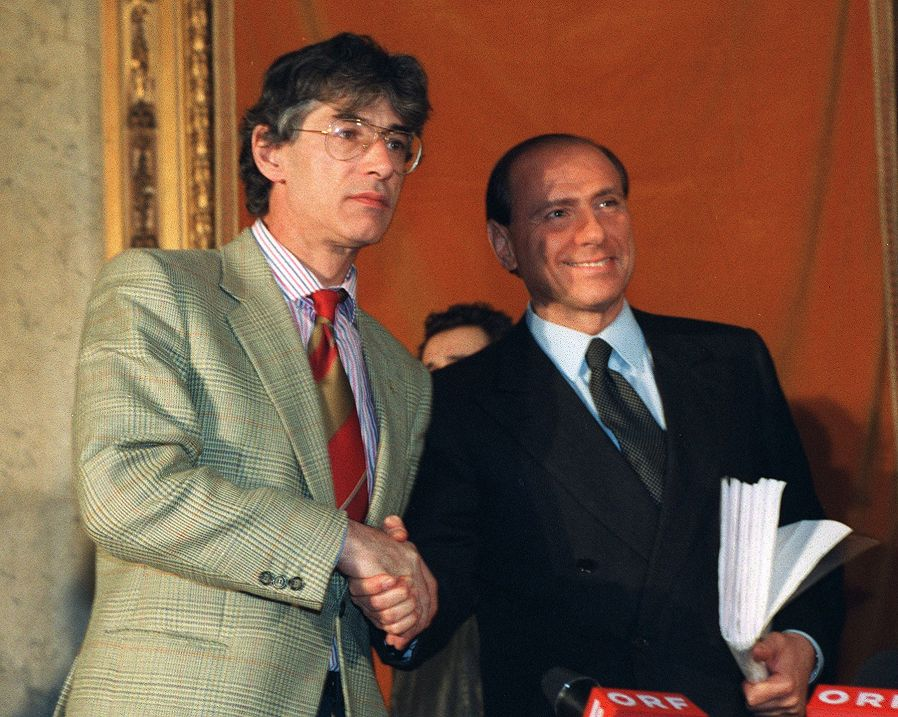
Silvio Berlusconi and Bossi in 1997

After the death of Salvadori in a car accident during the summer of 1980, Bossi began focusing more on Lombardy. After two years, the autonomist Lega Lombarda (Lombard League) was born. In that period, Bossi met his second wife, Manuela Marrone. The Lombard League later sought alliances with similar movements in Veneto and Piedmont, forming Lega Nord (Northern League), of which he was the federal secretary until 5 April 2012. He became the undisputed and unchallenged leader of the party, a position that he maintained even after a serious stroke. Until his death in 2026, he was the League's federal president, an honorary title devoid of real power, and had been trying to regain the leadership of the movement he founded.

When the scandals of Tangentopoli were unveiled from 1992 on, Bossi rode the wave, presenting himself as the new man in politics, and set out to sweep away corruption and incompetence. Bossi himself received an eight-month suspended prison sentence, along with Northern League's treasurer at the time of the events, Alessandro Patelli, for receiving a 200-million-lire bribe in a trial that also convicted many of the politicians he routinely attacked, such as Bettino Craxi, Arnaldo Forlani, and others. Bossi's sentence was upheld on appeal.

In 1998, Bossi received a one-year suspended prison sentence for incitement of violence after he uttered the following sentence at a Northern League meeting: "We must hunt down these rascals [neo-fascists], and if they take votes from us, then let's comb the area house by house, because we kicked the fascists out of here once before after the war." While being Minister for Institutional Reforms and Devolution in 2003, Bossi ordered the Italian Navy to fire live rounds on boats holding illegal immigrants, stating: "After the second or third warning, bang ... we fire the cannon." Bossi was critical of the European Union, and once described it as a "nest of communist bankers".

== Institutional experience ==
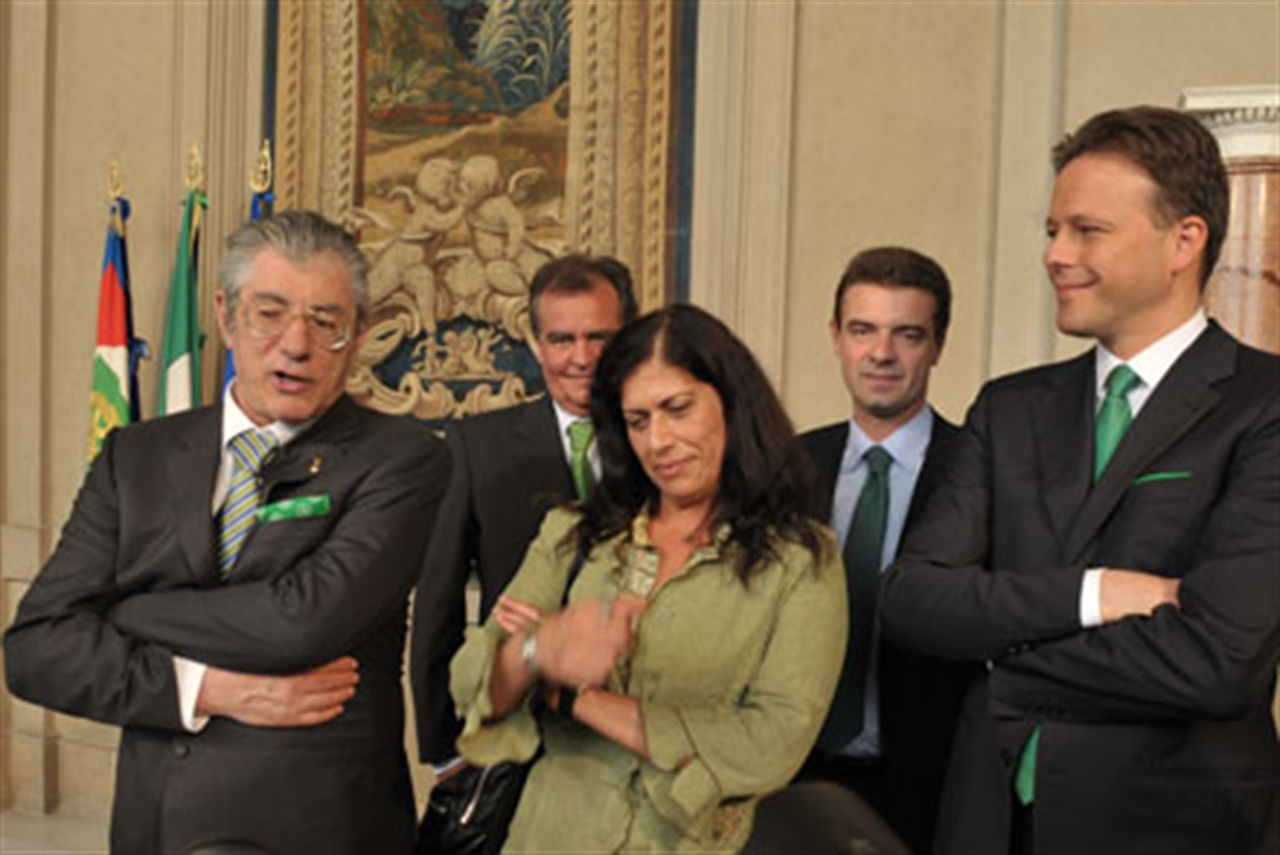
Bossi (on the left) with Roberto Calderoli, Rosy Mauro, Roberto Cota, and Federico Bricolo

Bossi began his institutional career in 1987 as the only senator of the Northern League, of which he was the leader. He was then given the nickname Senatur (Italian pronunciation: [sena'tu:r], 'senator' in Lombard), which stuck even when he was later elected as a deputy. He was instrumental in the unexpected victory of Silvio Berlusconi's coalition in the 1994 Italian general election but broke the alliance after just a few months, with the first Berlusconi government collapsing before Christmas 1994.

Bossi agreed to return to an alliance with Berlusconi, which ultimately led to the expected victory in the 2001 Italian general election. He then served in the second Berlusconi government as Minister for Institutional Reforms and Devolution. After suffering a stroke on 11 March 2004, which seriously impaired his speech, he quit on 19 July 2004 to take up a seat as a member of the European Parliament (MEP), where he registered an attendance of 9 per cent of the plenary sessions in his last mandate. Bossi later slowly returned to active politics.

== Return to political activity ==
On 11 January 2005, Bossi appeared on the political scene at the last house of the Lombard federalist politician Carlo Cattaneo at Lugano after 306 days from the accident. During that day, he met the then Minister of Economy Giulio Tremonti of Forza Italia, with whom he constituted the political agreement called Asse del Nord (Alliance of the North). He also met a representative of the Lega dei Ticinesi (Ticino League), a Swiss localist movement led by the Luganese entrepreneur Giuliano Bignasca. During his speech, Bossi spoke against the "Europe of Masons".

During the 2006 Italian general election, Bossi signed a political agreement with the Movement for Autonomy (MpA), led by the Sicilian politician Raffaele Lombardo. On 17 September 2006, he returned to Venice for the tenth anniversary of the Declaration of Independence of Padania. He declared that the Parliament of the North must be opened again. On 2 February 2007, he officially opened in Vicenza, the first monthly meeting of the Parliament of the North. Bossi and the Northern League abandoned the idea of independence for Padania, first proposed in 1996. In September 2007, Bossi accepted an invitation by Father Florian Abrahamowicz to his celebration of a Tridentine Mass and said there were affinities between the Northern League and the followers of Archbishop Marcel Lefebvre. Father Abrahamowicz is seen as the unofficial chaplain of the party.

On 8 May 2008, Bossi became Minister for Institutional Reforms in the fourth Berlusconi government. He held the position until 16 November 2011.

== Resignation as Northern League leader ==
On 5 April 2012, when news broke of an alleged appropriation of party funds for the private affairs of his family, Bossi resigned as federal secretary of Northern League. Italian prosecutors alleged that Bossi used the money earmarked for his party on his house renovations and on favours for his family. Following the resignation, the Northern League instantly gave him the honorary position of party president. Leadership of the Northern League was initially entrusted to a "triumvirate" composed by Roberto Maroni, Roberto Calderoli, and Manuela Dal Lago. On 7 December 2013, after the leadership election, Matteo Salvini took over as official leader of the party.

With a decision of August 2019, Italy's Supreme Court of Cassation decreed, as reported by Reuters, that "the case against former League leader Umberto Bossi and his former party treasurer had expired due to the statute of limitations, but the confiscation of the funds remained in place." The ruling was published on 5 November 2019 after a Court of Appeals ruling of 26 November 2018 and initial ruling of 24 July 2017, related to the party's financial statements of 2009 and 2010.

== Death ==
Bossi died in Varese on 19 March 2026, at the age of 84.

== Electoral history ==
Election	House	Constituency	Party	Votes	Result
1983	Chamber of Deputies	Como–Sondrio–Varese	LpT	157	Not elected
1985	Regional Council of Lombardy	Varese	LL	943	Not elected
1987	Senate of the Republic	Lombardy – Varese	LL	15,802	Elected
1989	European Parliament	North-West Italy	LL	68,519	Elected
1992	Chamber of Deputies	Milan–Pavia	LL	239,798	Elected
1994	Chamber of Deputies	Milan 1	LN	46,570	Elected
1994	European Parliament	North-West Italy	LN	387,546	Elected
1996	Chamber of Deputies	Milan 1	LN	10,179	Not elected
1996	Chamber of Deputies	Milan 1	LN	– (Note: Elected in a closed list proportional representation system.)	Elected
1999	European Parliament	North-West Italy	LN	134,318	Elected
2001	Chamber of Deputies	Milan 3	LN	40,372	Elected
2004	European Parliament	North-West Italy	LN	182,823	Elected
2008	Chamber of Deputies	Lombardy	LN	–	Elected
2009	European Parliament	North-West Italy	LN	171,052	Elected
2013	Chamber of Deputies	Lombardy	LN	–	Elected
2018	Senate of the Republic	Varese	LN	–	Elected
2022	Chamber of Deputies	Varese	LN	–	Elected

=== First-past-the-post elections ===
1994 general election (C): Lombardy — Milan 1
Candidate	Coalition	Votes	%
Umberto Bossi	Pole of Freedoms	46,570	48.7
Franco Bassanini	Alliance of Progressives	24,305	25.4
Gianni Rivera	Pact for Italy	11,321	11.8
Ignazio La Russa	National Alliance	8,561	9.0
Others		4,829	5.0
Total		95,586	100.0

1996 general election (C): Lombardy — Milan 1
Candidate	Coalition	Votes	%
Silvio Berlusconi	Pole for Freedoms	46,098	51.5
Michele Salvati	The Olive Tree	32,464	36.3
Umberto Bossi	Lega Nord	10,179	11.4
Others		766	0.9
Total		89,507	100.0

2001 general election (C): Lombardy — Milan 3
Candidate	Coalition	Votes	%
Umberto Bossi	House of Freedoms	40,372	53.1
Alberto Martinelli	The Olive Tree	31,454	41.3
Others		4,266	5.6
Total		76,092	100.0

== See also ==
- Padanian Declaration of Independence
- Padanian nationalism

Political offices
Preceded by Antonio Maccanico	Minister for Institutional Reforms and Devolution; 2001–2004	Succeeded by Roberto Calderoli
Preceded by Vannino Chiti	Minister for Federal Reforms; 2008–2011	Succeeded by Title abolished
New political party	Federal Secretary of Northern League; 1989–2012	Succeeded by Roberto Maroni
