= Pomponesco =

Pomponesco Pumpunésch (Emilian)
- Comune
- Comune di Pomponesco
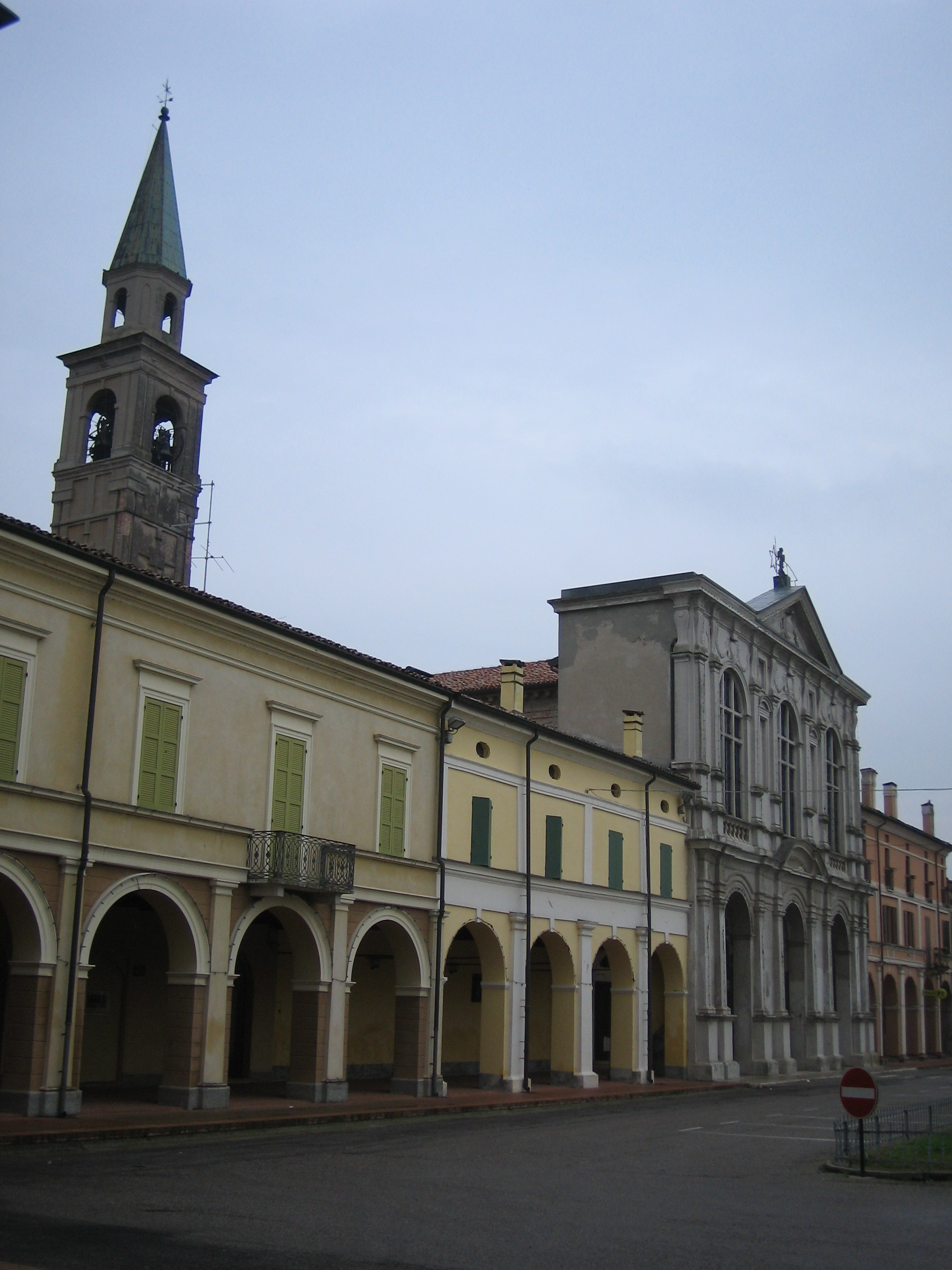
- The church of Santa Felicita e Sette Fratelli

- Location within Italy Location within Lombardy
- Coordinates: 44°56′N 10°36′E
- Country: Italy
- Region: Lombardy
- Province: Mantua (MN)
- Frazioni: Banzuolo, Inghella, Salina

Area
  - Total: 12 km^{2} (4.6 sq mi)
- Elevation: 23 m (75 ft)

Population (1 May 2009)
  - Total: 1,761
  - Density: 150/km^{2} (380/sq mi)
- Demonym: Pomponescani
- Time zone: UTC+1 (CET)
  - Summer (DST): UTC+2 (CEST)
- Postal code: 46030
- Dialing code: 0375
- ISTAT code: 020043
- Patron saint: Santa Felicita e Sette Fratelli martiri
- Saint day: Second Sunday in July
- Website: Official website

Pomponesco (Casalasco-Viadanese: Pumpunésch) is a comune in the Italian Province of Mantua. As of 2007, the estimated population of Pomponesco was 1,770.

It is one of I Borghi più belli d'Italia ("The most beautiful villages of Italy"). The experimental musical artist Maurizio Bianchi was born there in 1955.
