= Roberto Maroni =

Italian politician (1955–2022)

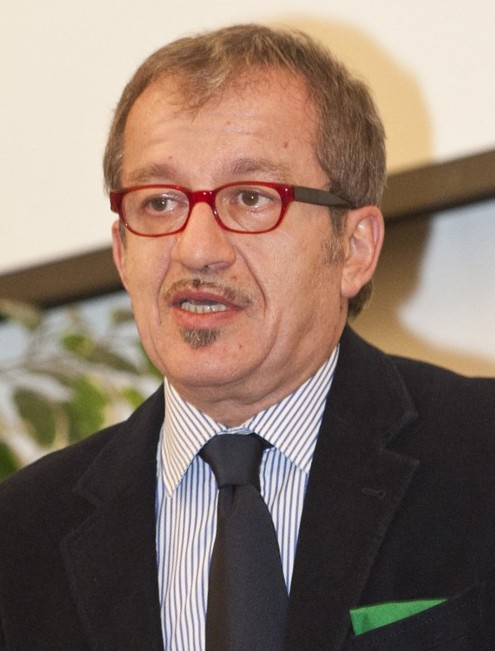
- Maroni in 2010

President of Lombardy
- In office 18 March 2013 – 26 March 2018
- Preceded by: Roberto Formigoni
- Succeeded by: Attilio Fontana

Federal Secretary of Northern League
- In office 1 July 2012 – 15 December 2013
- Preceded by: Umberto Bossi
- Succeeded by: Matteo Salvini

Minister of the Interior
- In office 8 May 2008 – 16 November 2011
- Prime Minister: Silvio Berlusconi
- Preceded by: Giuliano Amato
- Succeeded by: Anna Maria Cancellieri
- In office 10 May 1994 – 17 January 1995
- Prime Minister: Silvio Berlusconi
- Preceded by: Nicola Mancino
- Succeeded by: Antonio Brancaccio

Minister of Labour
- In office 11 June 2001 – 17 May 2006
- Prime Minister: Silvio Berlusconi
- Preceded by: Cesare Salvi
- Succeeded by: Cesare Damiano

Deputy Prime Minister of Italy
- In office 11 May 1994 – 17 January 1995 Serving with Giuseppe Tatarella
- Prime Minister: Silvio Berlusconi

Member of the Chamber of Deputies
- In office 23 April 1992 – 14 March 2013
- Constituency: Lombardy

Personal details
- Born: Roberto Ernesto Maroni; 15 March 1955 Varese, Italy
- Died: 22 November 2022 (aged 67) Lozza, Italy
- Party: Northern League
- Height: 1.70 m (5 ft 7 in)
- Spouse: Emilia Macchi
- Children: 3
- Education: University of Milan
- Profession: Lawyer
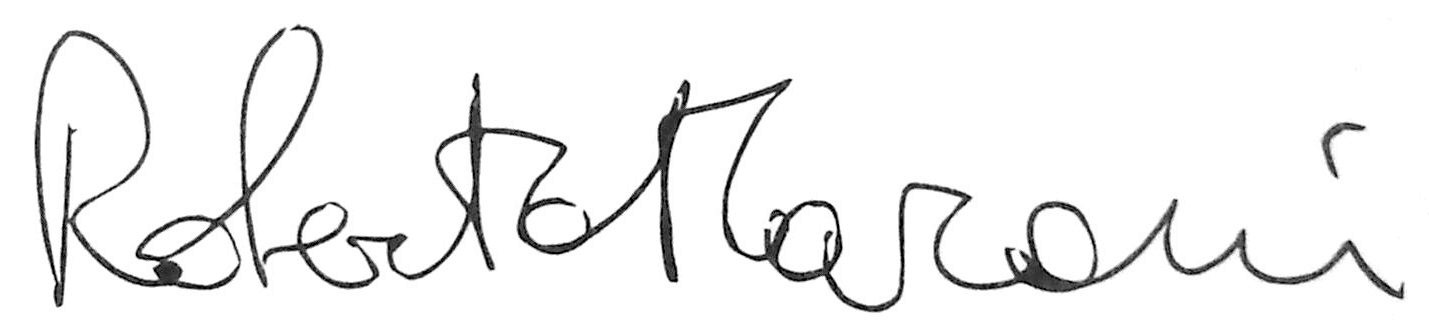
- Signature

Roberto Ernesto Maroni (Italian pronunciation: [roˈbɛrto maˈroːni]; 15 March 1955 – 22 November 2022) was an Italian politician from Varese and a past President of Lombardy. He was the leader of the Northern League, a party seeking autonomy or independence for Northern Italy or Padania. From 1992 to 2013 he was a Member of the Chamber of Deputies of the Italian Republic, always elected in Lombard constituencies. He served as Deputy Prime Minister of the Italian Republic in the Berlusconi I executive, from 1994 to 1995. He was Interior Minister of the Italian Republic from 1994 to 1995, and from 2008 to 2011. He was Labour Minister of the Italian Republic from 2001 to 2006.

== Career ==
=== Early political career ===
In 1979, Maroni received a law degree with a dissertation in Civil Law, from the University of Milan. He became a lawyer after spending two years working as a Legal Affairs Manager for various companies.

=== Secretary of Varese and Minister of Interior ===
In 1990, he was elected Province Secretary of the Northern League in Varese. He also became a town councilor in Varese that year. Two years later, he was elected Chairman of the Northern League Parliamentary Group. He also entered the party's Federal Council and campaigned heavily for the Northern League prior to Prime Minister Silvio Berlusconi's first Cabinet.

He also served as Minister of the Interior during the first Berlusconi cabinet, from 1994 to 1995. He also served as Minister of Labour and Welfare from 2001 to May 2006 in Berlusconi's second and third cabinets.

In April 2006, after Berlusconi narrowly lost his re-election bid to Romano Prodi, Maroni alleged problems with the election comparable to those in Florida during the 2000 Presidential election. "The level pegging is very similar to what happened in Florida. With one vote more or one vote less, you lose or you win," he said.

After the 2008 electoral victory of the centre-right coalition in Italy, Maroni assumed the office of Minister of the Interior in the Berlusconi IV Cabinet.

=== Secretary of Lega Nord and President of Lombardy (2013–2018) ===
Following the forced retirement of Umberto Bossi due to his alleged involvement in a scandal, Maroni was elected Political Secretary of the Northern League at its Congress in Assago (on 30 June and 1 July 2012). After the election on 24 February 2013, he became the ninth President of Lombardy.

== Passion for music ==
In September 2006, Maroni told Vanity Fair that he downloads music illegally and thinks music should be "free and accessible to all". He added that authors should still be able to stop their work from being widely distributed on the Internet. Maroni said his confession was intended to spark a discussion in Parliament about changing Italy's copyright laws, which are among the strictest in Europe.

== Basic income ==
On 12 May 2015, Maroni announced that his intention to introduce a basic income, as a pilot project, "to ensure all families in the region have enough money to be able to pay for basic necessities". He also said that the plan was to use €220 million from the European Social Fund (ESF) for the initiative.

== Terrorism ==
Shortly after the 2016 Normandy church attack, Maroni called on the Pope to "immediately proclaim" Jacques Hamel "St Jacques."

== Electoral history ==
Election	House	Constituency	Party	Votes	Result
1992	Chamber of Deputies	Como–Sondrio–Varese	LL	29,618	Elected
1994	Chamber of Deputies	Varese	LN	53,640	Elected
1996	Chamber of Deputies	Lombardy 1	LN	– (Note: Elected in a closed list proportional representation system.)	Elected
2001	Chamber of Deputies	Varese	LN	45,905	Elected
2006	Chamber of Deputies	Lombardy 2	LN	–	Elected
2008	Chamber of Deputies	Lombardy 2	LN	–	Elected

=== First-past-the-post elections ===
1994 general election (C): Varese
Candidate	Coalition	Votes	%
Roberto Maroni	Pole of Freedoms	53,640	61.4
Angelo Guerraggio	Alliance of Progressives	16,221	18.5
Pier Maria Morresi	Pact for Italy	11,507	13.2
Luigi Federiconi	National Alliance	6,060	6.9
Total		87,428	100.0

2001 general election (C): Varese
Candidate	Coalition	Votes	%
Roberto Maroni	House of Freedoms	45,905	57.8
Lorenzo Carabelli	The Olive Tree	28,853	36.3
Remigio Benelli	Italy of Values	4,721	5.9
Total		79,479	100.0
