= List of members of the Regional Council of Tuscany, 2015–2020 =

The X Legislature of the Regional Council of Tuscany, the legislative assembly of Tuscany, was inaugurated on 25 June 2015, following the 2015 regional election.

Eugenio Giani (Democratic Party) served as the president of the council, while Enrico Rossi (Democratic Party) served as president of Tuscany at the head of his second regional government.

== Members by party of election ==
=== Democratic Party ===
- Gianni Anselmi
- Stefano Baccelli
- Paolo Bambagioni
- Simone Bezzini
- Ilaria Bugetti
- Giacomo Bugliani
- Fiammetta Capirossi
- Vincenzo Ceccarelli (until 7 July 2015, appointed regional assessor)
  - Valentina Vadi (from 7 July 2015 to 25 June 2019, elected mayor of San Giovanni Valdarno)
  - Simone Tartaro (since 25 June 2019)
- Nicola Ciolini
- Lucia De Robertis
- Federica Fratoni (until 7 July 2015, appointed regional assessor)
  - Massimo Baldi (since 7 July 2015)
- Francesco Gazzetti
- Eugenio Giani (president of the regional council)
- Ilaria Giovannetti
- Leonardo Marras
- Antonio Mazzeo
- Monia Monni
- Alessandra Nardini
- Marco Niccolai
- Andrea Pieroni
- Enrico Rossi (president of Tuscany)
- Stefania Saccardi (until 7 July 2015, appointed regional assessor)
  - Elisabetta Meucci (since 7 July 2015)
- Stefano Scaramelli
- Enrico Sostegni
- Serena Spinelli

=== Brothers of Italy ===
- Giovanni Donzelli (until 11 April 2018, elected at the Chamber of Deputies)
  - Paolo Marcheschi (since 11 April 2018)

=== Five Star Movement ===
- Gabriele Bianchi
- Enrico Cantone (until 22 May 2017, resigned)
  - Monica Pecori (since 22 May 2017)
- Irene Galletti
- Giacomo Giannarelli
- Andrea Quartini

=== Forza Italia ===
- Stefano Mugnai (until 11 April 2018, elected at the Chamber of Deputies)
  - Maurizio Marchetti (since 11 April 2018)
- Marco Stella

=== Lega Nord Toscana ===
- Jacopo Alberti
- Claudio Borghi (until 11 April 2018, elected at the Chamber of Deputies)
  - Roberto Biasci (since 11 April 2018)
- Marco Casucci
- Elisa Montemagni
- Roberto Salvini
- Manuel Vescovi (until 11 April 2018, elected at the Senate of the Republic)
  - Luciana Bartolini (since 11 April 2018)

=== Tuscany to the Left ===
- Tommaso Fattori
- Paolo Sarti

== Election ==
31 May 2015 Tuscan regional election results
Candidates	Votes	%	Seats	Parties	Votes	%	Seats
Enrico Rossi	656,920	48.02	1				
Enrico Rossi	656,920	48.02	1	Democratic Party	614,869	45.93	24
Enrico Rossi	656,920	48.02	1	Tuscan People–Reformists 2020	22,760	1.70	–
Enrico Rossi	656,920	48.02	1	Total	637,629	47.63	24
Claudio Borghi	273,795	20.02	2				
Claudio Borghi	273,795	20.02	2	Northern League Tuscany	214,430	16.02	4
Claudio Borghi	273,795	20.02	2	Brothers of Italy	51,152	3.82	1
Claudio Borghi	273,795	20.02	2	Total	265,582	19.84	5
Giacomo Giannarelli	205,818	15.05	1	Five Star Movement	200,771	15.00	4
Stefano Mugnai	124,432	9.10	1				
Stefano Mugnai	124,432	9.10	1	Forza Italia	112,658	8.41	1
Stefano Mugnai	124,432	9.10	1	Lega Toscana–More Tuscany	7,996	0.60	–
Stefano Mugnai	124,432	9.10	1	Total	120.654	9.01	1
Tommaso Fattori	85,870	6.28	1	Tuscany to the Left	83,187	6.21	1
Giovanni Lamioni	17,146	1.27	–	Passion for Tuscany	15,837	1.18	–
Gabriele Chiurli	3,621	0.26	–	Direct Democracy	3,319	0.25	–
Total candidates	1,367,872	100.00	6	Total parties	1,326,979	100.00	35
Source: Ministry of the Interior – Historical Archive of Elections

== Executive branch ==
The Regional Government (Giunta Regionale) was sworn in on 7 July 2015.

Party		Members
Democratic Party	PD	President and 8 assessors

Member	Party	Delegate for
Enrico Rossi (president)	PD	–
Monica Barni (vice president)	PD	Culture, university and research
Vittorio Bugli	PD	Institutional reforms, budget and finance
Vincenzo Ceccarelli	PD	Transports and urban planning
Stefano Ciuoffo	PD	Economy and tourism
Federica Fratoni	PD	Environment
Cristina Grieco	PD	Education
Marco Remaschi	PD	Agriculture
Stefania Saccardi	PD	Healthcare and sports
