= Lega Lombarda =

- Secretary: Massimiliano Romeo
- Founded: 12 April 1984
- Headquarters: Via Bellerio 41, Milan
- Ideology: Regionalism; Lombard nationalism Populism
- National affiliation: Lega Nord (1991–2020); Lega per Salvini Premier (2020–present)
- Colours: Red White
- Regional Council: 14 / 80
- Chamber of Deputies (Lombardy seats): 35 / 102
- Senate (Lombardy seats): 17 / 49

Website
- www.legalombardasalvini.com www.legalombarda.leganord.org

Lega Lombarda (English: Lombard League, LL), whose complete name is Lega Lombarda per Salvini Premier (English: Lombard League for Salvini Premier), is a regionalist political party active in Lombardy. Established in 1984, it was one of the founding "national" sections of Lega Nord (LN) in 1991 and has been the regional section of Lega per Salvini Premier (LSP) in Lombardy since 2020. Along with Liga Veneta, the LL has formed the bulk of the federal party (LN/LSP), which has been led by Lombards since its foundation.

The LL is currently led by Massimiliano Romeo, elected secretary in 2024. Leading members of the party have included Umberto Bossi, Roberto Maroni, Francesco Speroni, Roberto Calderoli, Giancarlo Giorgetti, Roberto Castelli, Matteo Salvini, who has led the federal party since 2013, Gian Marco Centinaio and Attilio Fontana, who has served as president of Lombardy since 2018.

== History ==
=== Background ===
The origins of Lombard identity and Lombard nationalism can be traced in the Duchy of Milan, the Five Days of Milan and the federalist thought of Carlo Cattaneo, even though the Lombard sentiment was often intertwined with Italian nationalism, especially during the Kingdom of Lombardy–Venetia under the Austrian Empire. Anti-Rome and anti-Italian sentiments grew after World War II.

In 1947 Giulio Bergmann, who would later serve as senator for the Italian Republican Party, launched the Movement for Local Autonomies in the province of Bergamo. In 1956 Guido Calderoli established the Bergamasque Autonomist Movement, which later evolved in the Autonomist Lombard Regional Movement and the Autonomist Padanian Regional Movement, before re-joining Christian Democracy. Calderoli would later form a short-lived Lega Lombarda and the Union of Autonomists of Italy, which obtained 0.06% of the vote in the 1970 regional election.

=== Bossi, foundation and early years ===
In the late 1970s Umberto Bossi, a former activist of the Italian Communist Party, emerged as the leading figure of Lombard nationalism. Through contacts with regional nationalist movements and parties, like the Valdostan Union (party leader Bruno Salvadori, who died in a car accident in 1980, was a close friend), the Ossolan Union for Autonomy, the List for Trieste and finally Liga Veneta (LV), Bossi learned about federalism and autonomism. Consequently, he started a series of publications and organisations, notably the Lombard North-Western Union for Autonomy, along with his brother Franco and Roberto Maroni, an activist of Proletarian Democracy. In the 1983 general election Bossi, along with future regional councillor Roberto Bernardelli, stood as candidate for the List of Trieste, with little success, especially if compared with the LV, which obtained one elect to the Chamber of Deputies and one to the Senate, and would have elects also in the 1985 regional election.

On 12 April 1984 the Lega Autonomista Lombarda (Lombard Autonomist League, LAL) was officially established by Bossi, who used the resonance of the name of the historical Lega Lombarda when choosing the name, Giuseppe Leoni, Manuela Marrone (Bossi's future wife), Pierangelo Brivio (Marrone's brother-in-law), Marino Moroni and Emilio Sogliaghi, but not Maroni who had taken a hiatus from politics and would return in 1989. In the 1984 European Parliament election, the LL joined forces with the LV, the Trentino Tyrolean People's Party, the Piedmontese Union and other minor parties, obtaining 0.5% of the vote countrywide and 0.7% in the province of Varese (the LV was stronger than the LL at the time). In the 1985 regional election the LL won 0.5% of the vote.

In 1986 the party took the current name. In the 1987 general election, the LL gained 2.6% of the vote in Lombardy: Bossi was elected to the Senate and Leoni to the Chamber of Deputies.

=== Transition to Lega Nord ===
The party participated in the 1989 European Parliament election as the leading member of the coalition named Lega Lombarda – Alleanza Nord (LL–AN), which included other five regional parties: the LV, Autonomist Piedmont, Ligurian Union, Emilia-Romagna League and Tuscan Alliance. In Lombardy the list obtained 8.1% in Lombardy and two MEPs, Francesco Speroni and Luigi Moretti.

In 1989–1990 the LL took part in the process of federating the northern regionalist parties, ahead of the regional elections. The LL was the most voted among the new regional parties, with 18.9% of the vote in the 1990 Lombard regional election (the LV was riven in internal conflicts at the time and especially suffered the competition of Green lists and the Union of the Venetian People).

In February 1991 the LL finally was merged with the five parties of the LL–AN alliance and newly-formed parties in the northern autonomous regions and provinces (the future Lega Vallée d'Aoste, Lega Alto Adige Südtirol, Lega Trentino, Lega Friuli and Lega Trieste) into Lega Nord (LN). Since then, the LL has been the "national" section of the LN in Lombardy. Bossi was subsequently elected federal secretary of the LN, while maintaining the role of national secretary of the LL for a while.

In the 1992 general election the LN obtained 8.7% of the vote countrywide, of which 23.0% in Lombardy, and dozens of LL members were elected to the Chamber and Senate.

=== Negri, Calderoli, Giorgetti ===
In 1993 Luigi Negri took over as secretary, replacing Bossi, who had to choose between national and federal office.

After the 1994 general election, in which the LN ran within Silvio Berlusconi's Pole of Freedoms coalition, three LL members joined Berlusconi's government as ministers: Maroni (the party's recognised number two), Vito Gnutti and Speroni. In December, Bossi chose to leave the government over pension reform. The break-up of the coalition supporting the government and its replacement by Lamberto Dini's "technocratic" government, thanks to the LN's support, led Negri and others to defect to the Federalist Italian League or the Federalists and Liberal Democrats, while Maroni, despite disagreements with Bossi, chose to stay in the party and was warmly re-welcomed by Bossi.

Negri was replaced as secretary by Roberto Calderoli, grandnewphew of Guido Calderoli, who, as president, had evicted him from the party, despite being his brother-in-law. Calderoli led the party to its best result up to that point in the 1996 general election, when it gained 25.5%.

After the 2000 regional election, the party joined the regional government and has since been a member of it, with no exceptions. After the 2001 general election, three LL members joined Berlusconi's government as ministers: Bossi (who would later have health problems and be replaced by Calderoli), Maroni and Roberto Castelli.

In 2002 Calderoli was replaced by Giancarlo Giorgetti, while Castelli became president.

In the 2010 regional election the party gained 26.2%, its best result so far.

=== Leadership of Salvini ===
In 2012 Giorgetti decided to step down from national secretary and the party elected its new leadership at a congress in June. Matteo Salvini ran as candidate of the faction around Roberto Maroni, while Cesarino Monti, a former mayor and senator, was the candidate of the old guard and of Bossi's loyalists. Salvini won the election with 74% of the votes, that is to say the support of 403 delegates out of 532. Soon after, Giorgetti was appointed national president.

In July 2012 Maroni was elected federal secretary of the LN by its federal congress. The Lombard delegates elected six members to the federal council: Giacomo Stucchi, Paolo Grimoldi, Andrea Mascetti, Gianni Fava, Simona Bordonali, and, on behalf of the minority, Marco Desiderati.

In the 2013 regional election Maroni was elected President of Lombardy with 42.8% of the vote and the party won 23.2% (combined result of party list and Maroni's personal list).

=== Leadership of Grimoldi ===
In November 2013 Salvini succeeded to Maroni as Lega Nord's federal secretary and, later on, he appointed a commissioner, Stefano Borghesi, to fill the post. Borghesi was later replaced by Grimoldi. In November 2015 Grimoldi was elected national secretary of the party.

In May 2017, after Salvini's re-election as LN federal secretary, five LL members (Bordonali, Fabrizio Cecchetti, Giulio De Capitani, Simona Pergreffi and Jacopo Vignati) were elected to the federal council with Salvini, a sixth (Giorgetti) was elected as an independent and a seventh (Gianni Fava) on behalf of the minority. In December Stucchi was elected president of LL, replacing Giorgetti, who whose more and more involved at the federal level as deputy of Salvini.

In the 2018 regional election LL's Attilio Fontana was elected President of Lombardy with 49.8% of the vote and the party obtained 29.4%. Contextually, in the 2018 general election the party won 28.0% of the vote and Salvini, as deputy prime minister and minister of the Interior, plus other two LL members would serve in Giuseppe Conte's first government until September 2019. In 2021 the party would join Mario Draghi's government with two LL members, Giorgetti as minister of Economic Development and Massimo Garavaglia as minister of Tourism.

=== Re-foundation ===
Following the formation of Lega per Salvini Premier and the 2019 federal congress of the LN, after which the latter became practically inactive, in February 2020 the LL was re-established as Lega Lombarda per Salvini Premier in order to become the regional section of the new party. The founding members of the new LL were Attilio Fontana, Paolo Grimoldi, Daniele Belotti, Stefano Borghesi, Fabrizio Cecchetti e Gian Marco Centinaio. Grimoldi continued to led the party through 2020.

In February 2021 Cecchetti replaced Grimoldi as pro-tempore coordinator. Grimoldi would become a frequent critic of the political line of the federal party, perceived to be too Rome-centric. After the disappointing result 2022 general election, in which the party was reduced to 13.3% of the vote in Lombardy, some leading members of the party's traditional wing, rooted in Padanian nationalism, formed Comitato Nord (English: Northern Committee, CN). The committee was inspired by Umberto Bossi and, under the leadership of Grimoldi and Angelo Ciocca, it attracted more than one thousand members in a couple of months. The inaugural event of the committee, held in early December, was attended by some 600 people, including former ministers Roberto Castelli and Francesco Speroni. Contextually, provincial congresses were held in some of the party's strongholds: critics of Salvini affiliated with the CN narrowly won in Bergamo and Brescia, while the pro-Salvini wing retained Varese for a handful of votes. In November 2023, Castelli started his own People's Party of the North.

In the meantime, the party joined Giorgia Meloni's government with five LL ministers, including Salvini as deputy prime minister and minister of Infrastructure and Transport and Giorgetti as minister of Economy and Finance. A few months later, in the 2023 regional election, Fontana was re-elected with 54.6% of the vote, but the party won 22.7% (combined result of party list and Fontana's personal list), coming second to Brothers of Italy (FdI), which thus obtained a large share of the regional government and one of its members at the head of the Regional Council. Right after the 2024 European Parliament election, long-time internal critic Grimoldi was ejected from the party; he would later organise his own platform, Pact for the North.

=== Leadership of Romeo ===
In the run-up of the party's December 2024 congress, the first after nine years, three candidates put forward their bid to become regional secretary: Massimiliano Romeo, leader of the federal party in the Senate, representing most of the rank-and-file; Luca Toccalini, leader of Lega Giovani, representing Salvini's loyalists; Cristian Invernizzi, former deputy, representing the more traditional base. When, especially after Invernizzi's retirement, it was clear that Romeo was going to win big, also Toccalini withdrew from the race. Romeo was thus elected unopposed. In his victory speech, he reclaimed the party's northern identity, while president of Lombardy Fontana spoke of "free Padania".

== Popular support ==
The party has its heartland in the northern and mountain provinces of Lombardy.

In the 2018 regional election it won 45.8% in Sondrio, 34.4% in Brescia, 36.7% in Bergamo, 33.4% in Lecco, 32.6% in Como and 30.9% in Varese (the party's cradle and original stronghold). However, the party obtained good results also in southern provinces, notably 33.4% in Lodi and 33.0% in Cremona.

The electoral results of Lega Lombarda in the region since 1989 are shown in the tables below.

1989 European	1990 regional	1992 general	1994 general	1994 European	1995 regional	1996 general	1999 European	2000 regional	2001 general	2004 European	2005 regional	2006 general
8.1	18.9	23.0	22.1	17.4	17.7	25.5	13.1	15.5	12.1	13.8	15.8	11.7

2008 general	2009 European	2010 regional	2013 general	2013 regional	2014 European	2018 general	2018 regional	2019 European	2022 general	2023 regional	2024 European
21.6	22.7	26.2	12.9	13.0	14.6	28.0	29.4	43.4	13.3	22.7	13.1

== Electoral results ==
=== Regional Council of Lombardy ===
Year	Votes	%	Seats	+/–	Leader
1985	28,074 (11th)	0.5	0 / 80	–	Umberto Bossi
1990	1,183,493 (2nd)	18.9	15 / 80	▲15	Umberto Bossi
1995	879,139 (2nd)	17.6	12 / 90	▼3	Roberto Calderoli
2000	702,479 (3rd)	15.4	11 / 80	▼1	Roberto Calderoli
2005	693,464 (2nd)	15.8	15 / 80	▲3	Giancarlo Giorgetti
2010	1,117,227 (2nd)	26.2	20 / 80	▲5	Giancarlo Giorgetti
2013	700,907 (4th); 552,863 (5th)	13.0 (party list); 10.2 (Maroni list)	26 / 80	▲6	Matteo Salvini
2018	1,553,514 (1st); 76,637 (9th)	29.4 (party list); 1.5 (Fontana list)	30 / 80	▲4	Paolo Grimoldi
2023	476,175 (3rd); 177,387 (5th)	16.5 (party list); 6.2 (Fontana list)	20 / 80	▼10	Federico Cecchetti

=== Italian Parliament ===
Only the results before Lega Nord's founding are reported here.

Chamber of Deputies
Year	Votes	%	Seats	+/–	Leader
1983	Into LpT	–	0 / 630	–	Umberto Bossi
1987	186.255	0.48	1 / 630	▲1	Umberto Bossi

Senate of the Republic
Year	Votes	%	Seats	+/–	Leader
1983	Into LpT	–	0 / 315	–	Umberto Bossi
1987	137.276	0.42	1 / 315	▲1	Umberto Bossi

== Leadership ==
- Secretary: Umberto Bossi (1984–1993), Luigi Negri (1993–1995), Roberto Calderoli (1995–2002), Giancarlo Giorgetti (2002–2012), Matteo Salvini (2012–2014), Stefano Borghesi (commissioner 2014–2015), Paolo Grimoldi (2015–2021), Fabrizio Cecchetti (commissioner 2021–2024), Massimiliano Romeo (2024–present)
- President: Augusto Arizzi (1986–1987), Silvana Bazzan (1987–1989), Franco Castellazzi (1989–1991), Francesco Speroni (1991–1993), Roberto Calderoli (1993–1995), Giuseppe Leoni (1995–1999), Stefano Galli (1999–2002), Roberto Castelli (2002–2012), Giancarlo Giorgetti (2012–2017), Giacomo Stucchi (2017–2020)
