= Giancarlo Giorgetti =

Italian politician (born 1966)

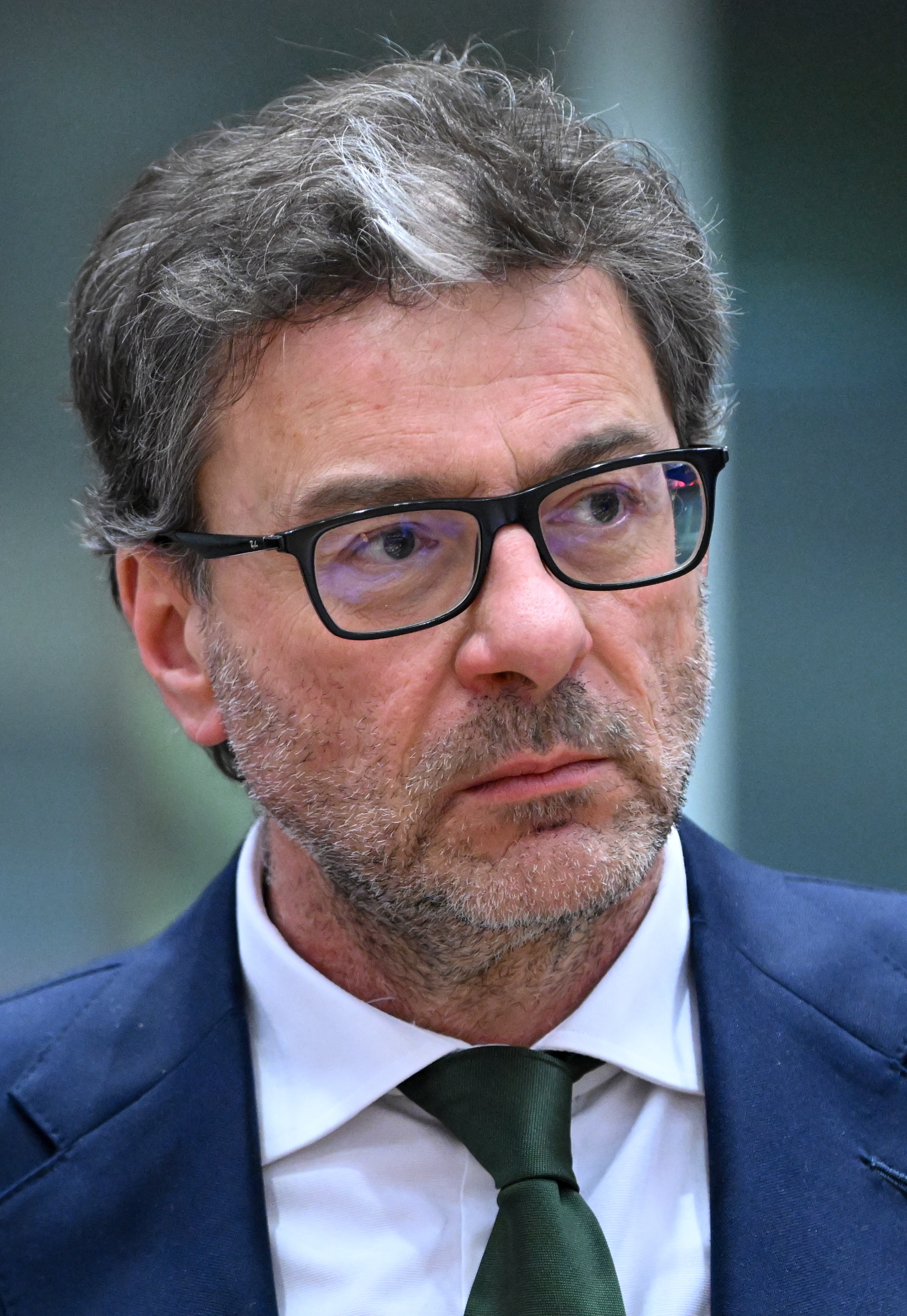
- Giorgetti in 2023

Minister of Economy and Finance
- Incumbent
- Assumed office 22 October 2022
- Prime Minister: Giorgia Meloni
- Preceded by: Daniele Franco

Minister of Economic Development
- In office 13 February 2021 – 22 October 2022
- Prime Minister: Mario Draghi
- Preceded by: Stefano Patuanelli
- Succeeded by: Adolfo Urso

Secretary of the Council of Ministers
- In office 1 June 2018 – 5 September 2019
- Prime Minister: Giuseppe Conte
- Preceded by: Maria Elena Boschi
- Succeeded by: Riccardo Fraccaro

Deputy Federal Secretary of Lega
- In office 26 February 2016 – 12 September 2024
- Secretary: Matteo Salvini
- Preceded by: Edoardo Rixi; Riccardo Molinari
- Succeeded by: Alberto Stefani; Claudio Durigon

Member of the Chamber of Deputies
- Incumbent
- Assumed office 9 May 1996
- Constituency: Lombardy

Mayor of Cazzago Brabbia
- In office 24 April 1995 – 14 June 2004
- Preceded by: Enrico Simonetta
- Succeeded by: Massimo Nicora

Personal details
- Born: 16 December 1966 (age 59) Cazzago Brabbia, Varese, Italy
- Party: MSI (1984–1990); LN-Lega (since 1990)
- Spouse: Laura Ferrari
- Children: 1
- Education: Bocconi University
- Occupation: Tax advisor

Giancarlo Giorgetti (Italian pronunciation: [dʒaŋˈkarlo dʒorˈdʒetti]; born 16 December 1966) is an Italian politician and prominent member of the Lega, of which he became deputy secretary in 2016. Since October 2022, Giorgetti has served as Minister of Economy and Finance in the government of Giorgia Meloni. Previously, he was Secretary of the Council of Ministers from June 2018 until September 2019, in the government of Giuseppe Conte and later Minister of Economic Development from February 2021 until October 2022, in the government of Mario Draghi.

== Early life and career ==
Giorgetti was born in 1966 in Cazzago Brabbia, a small town in the Province of Varese. He later graduated in business economics at the Bocconi University, becoming a tax advisor and financial auditor.

During the university he was close to the Youth Front, the youth-wing of the nationalist Italian Social Movement (MSI). However, in the early 1990s, he joined Lega Lombarda and Lega Nord, the separatist movements founded by Umberto Bossi, and on 23 April 1995 he was elected mayor of his hometown, Cazzago Brabbia, a position that he held until 12 June 2004.

== Political career ==
Elected to the Chamber of Deputies for the first time in 1996 Italian general election, he was re-elected in 2001, 2006, 2008, 2013 and 2018. From 2001 to 2006 and again from 2008 to 2013, he was the chairman of the Budget Committee in the Chamber. Within the party, he was national secretary of Lega Lombarda from 2002 to 2012 and has been deputy federal secretary of Lega Nord since 2016.

Giorgetti was described by The New York Times as a powerful aide to Umberto Bossi, founder and federal secretary of Lega Nord from 1991 to 2012; and by The Economist as his "dauphin". In 2010, The Guardian described him as an "influential member of Berlusconi's Lega Nord party", where Berlusconi stood erroneously for Bossi. Under Matteo Salvini, Bossi's opponent and new federal secretary of Lega Nord since 2013, Giorgetti continued to be one of the most influential members of the party.

== Political views and controversies ==
Giorgetti is a federalist and regionalist politician who supports decentralization. Speaking at the 2018 edition of the Communion and Liberation's Rimini Meeting on 20 August 2018, he addressed the rise of populism, stating that "the Italian Parliament doesn't matter anymore because it's no longer understood by citizens, who see it as a place of political inconclusiveness". In 2006, Giorgetti found himself at the center of a controversy for having refused in 2004 a 50–100,000 euro bribe from Italian banker Gianpiero Fiorani.

Giorgetti is a vocal supporter of a first-past-the-post based electoral system and pushes for a return to the Italian electoral law of 1993 (Mattarellum), although it was repealed in favor of the Italian electoral law of 2005 (Porcellum, subsequently declared unconstitutional) with Lega Nord's support. In 2020, Giorgetti argued that Italy needs an electoral system that "makes possible to govern. Of all the electoral systems I've known, the one that worked best is Mattarellum", saying that "local mayors, entrepreneurs, professionals and people representing their own territory were brought into nationwide politics thanks to FPTP's single-member districts mechanism".

== Electoral history ==
Election	House	Constituency	Party	Votes	Result
1996	Chamber of Deputies	Lombardy 2 – Sesto Calende	LN	29,314	Elected
2001	Chamber of Deputies	Lombardy 2 – Sesto Calende	LN	41,184	Elected
2006	Chamber of Deputies	Lombardy 1	LN	– (Note: Elected in a closed list proportional representation system.)	Elected
2008	Chamber of Deputies	Lombardy 1	LN	–	Elected
2013	Chamber of Deputies	Lombardy 2	LN	–	Elected
2018	Chamber of Deputies	Lombardy 2	Lega	–	Elected
2022	Chamber of Deputies	Lombardy 2 – Sondrio	Lega	108,138	Elected

=== First-past-the-post elections ===
1996 general election (C): Lombardy 2 — Sesto Calende
Candidate	Coalition	Votes	%
Giancarlo Giorgetti	Lega Nord	29,314	37.8
Renato Montalbetti	The Olive Tree	27,783	30.7
Carlo Castiglioni	Pole for Freedoms	22,633	29.2
Others		1,844	2.4
Total		77,574	100.0

2001 general election (C): Lombardy 2 — Sesto Calende
Candidate	Coalition	Votes	%
Giancarlo Giorgetti	House of Freedoms	41,184	54.5
Renato Montalbetti	The Olive Tree	28,363	37.5
Others		6,042	8.0
Total		75,589	100.0

2022 general election (C): Lombardy 2 — Sondrio
Candidate	Coalition	Votes	%
Giancarlo Giorgetti	Centre-right	108,138	61.8
Valeria Caterina Duico	Centre-left	34,596	19.8
Alessandro Stefano Bertolini	Action - Italia Viva	14,949	8.5
Luca Sangalli	Five Star Movement	8,535	4.9
Others		8,375	5.0
Total		174,829	100.0
