= Daniele Roscia =

Italian politician (1954–2026)

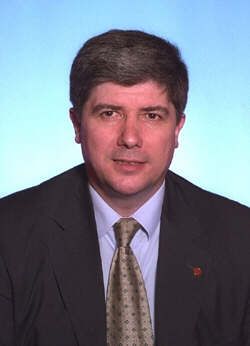

Member of the Chamber of Deputies
- In office 15 April 1994 – 29 May 2001
- Constituency: Rezzato

Mayor of Gargnano
- In office 7 June 1993 – 14 May 2001
- Preceded by: Enrico Lievi
- Succeeded by: Marcello Festa

Personal details
- Born: 19 March 1954 Vobarno, Italy
- Died: 27 April 2026 (aged 72) Vobarno, Italy
- Party: Lega Nord (until 2000); ApE (from 2000)
- Occupation: Politician, accountant

Daniele Roscia (19 March 1954 – 27 April 2026) was an Italian politician.

== Life and career ==
Roscia was born on 19 March 1954 and graduated as an accountant. In 1989 he joined the Lombard League, in which he created the reputation of being one of the most loyal to the line of secretary Umberto Bossi. From 1992 to 1993 he held the position of provincial secretary of the League in Brescia and in 1993 he was elected mayor of Gargnano with 33% of the votes, a position he confirmed in 1997 with 45.3%.

In 1994 he was elected to the Chamber of Deputies with the Lega Nord for the XII legislature, in the single-member constituency of Rezzato, supported by the coalition of the Pole of Freedom, obtaining 54.55% of the votes. In 1996, he was re-elected with 41.37% with the support of the League alone. It was during this legislature that he acquired national fame, when, during the vote of confidence requested by Prime Minister Romano Prodi following the decision of Communist Refoundation Party to leave the majority, he approached the presidency bench offering to let some Lega Nord deputies out of the chamber to ensure the survival of the government, in exchange for the special statute for the regions of northern Italy and the assignment of a RAI network to the Lega Nord. Prodi, who declined the offer, denounced the incident a few days later, provoking the ire of Bossi, who initially dismissed it as boasting. Roscia, on the other hand, confirmed Prodi's words but also declared that he had acted on his own initiative, without consulting Bossi beforehand, who would therefore have been effectively unaware of them. This affair marked a crisis in relations between Bossi and Roscia, who, in fact, at the subsequent congress of the Lega Nord, held in July 1999, supported Domenico Comino's motion calling for a change in the political line of the movement, with the opening of a dialogue with the parties of the Pole for Freedom. The motion was rejected, and Roscia was expelled, along with Comino. In parliament, he joined the Mixed Group and founded his own movement called Lombardy Lombardy, which at the beginning of 2000 joined the Autonomists for Europe (ApE), which saw Comino as its leader.

From 2004 to 2009, he was a city councillor for a civic list in Roè Volciano.

In 2025, he took part in the foundation of Paolo Grimoldi's Pact for the North, joining his political secretariat.

Roscia died on 27 April 2026, at the age of 72.
