= Claudio Borghi =

Claudio Borghi may refer to:

- Claudio Borghi (footballer) (born 1964), Argentine football manager and former player
- Claudio Borghi (politician) (born 1970), Italian politician
