= Lega Giovani =

Youth League Lega Giovani
- Chairperson: Luca Toccalini
- Founded: 1991
- Ideology: Right-wing populism; Conservatism; Regionalism; Federalism; Euroscepticism
- Mother party: Lega per Salvini Premier; Lega Nord
- European affiliation: Identity and Democracy Party
- Website: legagiovani.it

Lega Giovani (English: Youth League), formally known as Movimento Giovani Padani (English: Young Padanians Movement, MGP), is the youth wing of the League, a right-wing political party in Italy. Its current Chairperson is Luca Toccalini.

Originally launched with a different name in 1991, the MGP was established in all the regions of northern Italy, called "Padania" by the League members, in 1996. Massimiliano Romeo, leader of the MGP in Lombardy since 1994, was the first federal coordinator.

The current leaders of Lega Nord and Lega Lombarda, Matteo Salvini and Paolo Grimoldi, were previously leaders of the MGP. The Movement, which staunchly supports Salvini, is seen by some in the party as a "faction" and, as such, some party bigwigs (including people close to Roberto Maroni and Roberto Calderoli) have proposed to disband it.

== Leadership ==
- Federal coordinator: Massimiliano Romeo (1996–1997), Max Loda (1997), Matteo Salvini (1998–2002), Paolo Grimoldi (2002–2011), Lucio Brignoli (2011–2013), Matteo Mognaschi (2013–2015), Andrea Crippa (2015–2019), Luca Toccalini (2019-present).
