= Claudia Terzi =

Italian politician (born 1974)

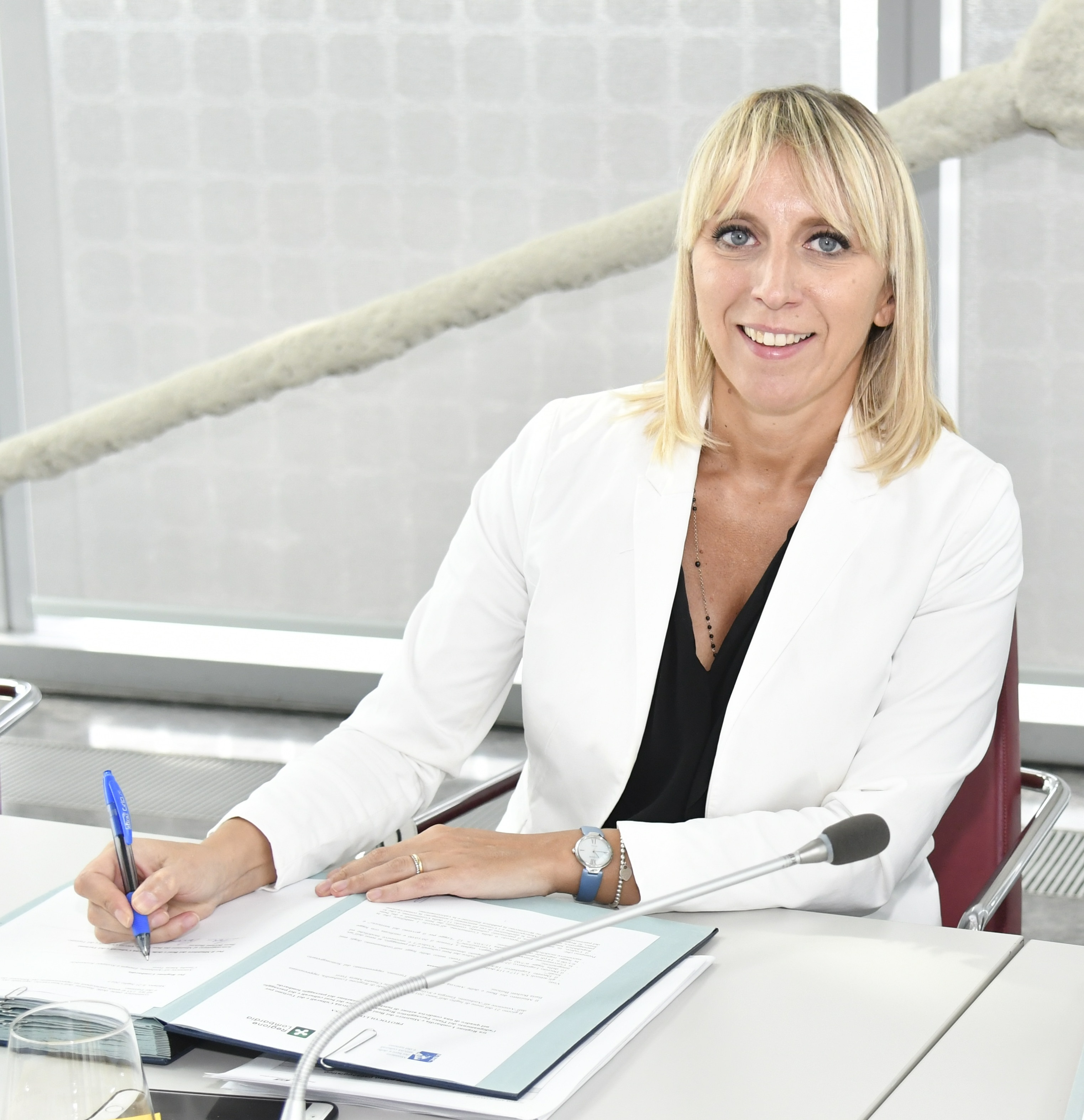

Mayor of Dalmine
- In office 8 June 2009 – 19 March 2013
- Preceded by: Francesca Bruschi
- Succeeded by: Alessandro Cividini

Member of Parliament of the Italian Republic
- In office 23 March 2018 – 27 June 2018
- Succeeded by: Luca Toccalini

Personal details
- Born: September 30, 1974 (age 51) Osio Sotto, Italy
- Party: Lega

Claudia Maria Terzi (30 September 1974, Osio Sotto, Italy) is an Italian politician.

== Political career ==
A prominent figure within the Lombard League (Lega Nord) in the Bergamo area, she served as a municipal councilor in Dalmine from 2004 to 2009. In the 2005 regional elections in Lombardy, she was a candidate for the Regional Council with the Lega Nord in the province of Bergamo but was not elected. In the 2009 local elections, she was elected as the mayor of Dalmine as part of the center-right coalition.

On March 19, 2013, she was appointed as the Regional Councilor for the Environment in Lombardy in the new government of Roberto Maroni, resigning from her position as mayor one year before the natural end of her term.

In the 2018 political elections, she was elected to the Chamber of Deputies on the Lombardy 1 constituency list for the Lega. On March 29, 2018, she was appointed as the Regional Councilor for Transportation in the newly formed regional government of Attilio Fontana. For this reason, on June 27, 2018, she resigned from her position as a deputy due to incompatibility, and she was succeeded by Luca Toccalini.
