= Lega Toscana (2011) =

- Leader: Emilio Paradiso
- Founded: 2011
- Split from: Lega Nord Toscana
- Ideology: Federalism
- Political position: Centre-right
- Regional Council of Tuscany: 0 / 41

Lega Toscana ("Tuscany League", LT) is a regionalist political party in Italy active in Tuscany.

The party was formed in January 2011 as Lega per la Toscana ("League for Tuscany") by a group of splinters from Lega Nord Toscana (LNT) led by Emilio Paradiso, a former president of the party, and Federico Tosoni, both based in Prato. They opposed Lega Nord's return to separatism, while they were strong proponents of federalism. As well as other splinters who had earlier formed Tuscan Identity, Paradiso and Tosoni had been rivals of Claudio Morganti, former leader of LNT and MEP.

In January 2012 the party was joined by a group of LNT splinters from the province of Lucca led by Franco Paiuzza.

In the 2015 regional election a joint list of the League for Tuscany and More Tuscany won 0.6% of the vote.

In the local elections of 2019, Emilio Paradiso ran for mayor of Prato. Eventually, Paradiso and his party scored just 1.3% of the votes and failed the election to the municipal council.

In the 2020 Tuscan regional election Paradiso was a candidate on the Lega per Salvini Premier lists, in support of Susanna Ceccardi's candidacy for president of the region, but was not elected.
