= Cazzago =

Cazzago may refer to places in Italy:

- Cazzago Brabbia, in the province of Varese
- Cazzago San Martino, in the province of Brescia
