= 2015 Tuscan regional election =

← 2010	31 May 2015	2020 →

All 41 seats in the Regional Council
- Turnout: 48.3% (▼12.4%)
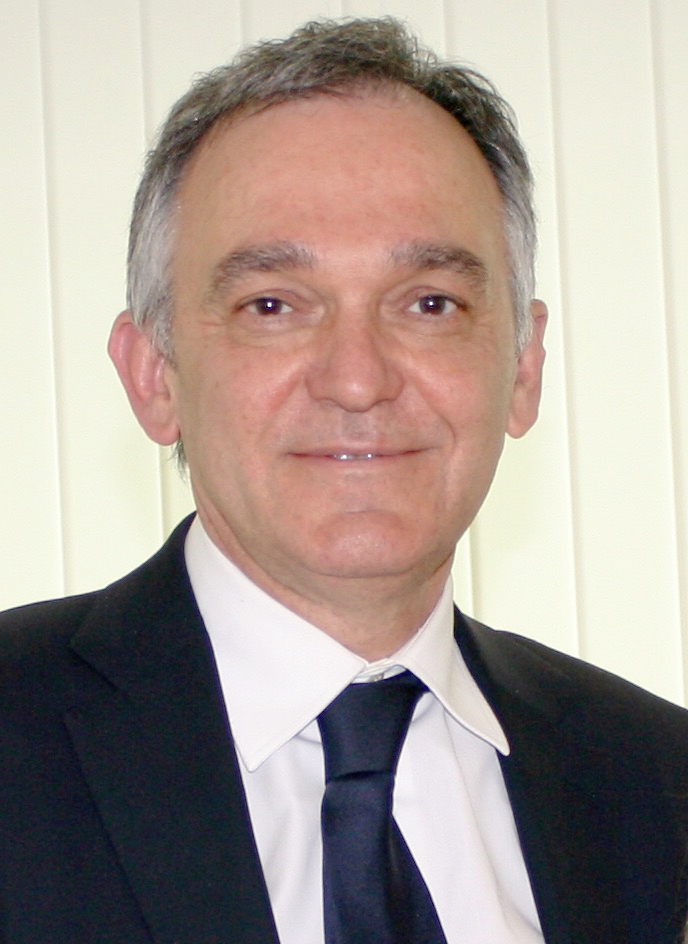

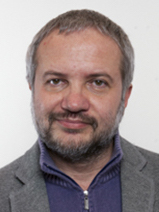

	Majority party	Minority party	Third party
Leader	Enrico Rossi	Claudio Borghi	Giacomo Giannarelli
Party	Democratic Party	Northern League	Five Star Movement
Alliance	Centre-left	LN–FdI
Seats won	25	7	5
Seat change	▼7	▲4	New
Popular vote	656,920	273,795	205,818
Percentage	48.1%	20.1%	15.1%
President before election
Enrico Rossi
Democratic Party
Elected President
Enrico Rossi
Democratic Party

The Tuscan regional election of 2015 took place on 31 May 2015.

== Electoral system ==
Tuscany uses its own legislation of 2014 to elect its Regional Council. The councillors are elected in provincial constituencies by proportional representation using the D'Hondt method. Florence constituency is further divided into 4 sub-constituencies. Preferential voting is allowed: a maximum of two preferences can be expressed for candidates of the same party list and provided the two chosen candidates are of different gender.

In this system parties are grouped in alliances, supporting a candidate for the post of President of Tuscany. The candidate receiving at least 40% of the votes is elected to the post and his/her list (or the coalition) is awarded a majority in the Regional Council. If no candidate gets more than 40% of the votes, a run-off is held fourteen days after, with only the two top candidates from the first round allowed. The winning candidate is assured a majority in the Regional Council.

== Council apportionment ==
According to the official 2011 Italian census, the 40 Council seats which must be covered by proportional representation are so distributed between Tuscan provinces. The number of seats to be assigned in each province is the following:

AR	FI	GR	LI	LU	MS	PI	PT	PO	SI
4	11	2	4	4	2	4	3	3	3

The Province of Florence is further divided into smaller electoral colleges.

== Parties and candidates ==
Political party or alliance	Constituent lists	Previous result		Candidate
Political party or alliance	Constituent lists	Votes (%)	Seats	Candidate
Centre-left coalition	Democratic Party	42.2	33	Enrico Rossi
Centre-left coalition	Tuscan People (incl. PSI)	—	—	Enrico Rossi
Centre-right coalition	Forza Italia	27.1	15	Stefano Mugnai
Centre-right coalition	Lega Toscana – More Tuscany (incl. MAT)	—	—	Stefano Mugnai
Tuscany to the Left (incl. SEL, PRC, PCdI)		9.1	3	Tommaso Fattori
Right-wing coalition	Northern League Tuscany	6.5	3	Claudio Borghi
Right-wing coalition	Brothers of Italy	—	—	Claudio Borghi
Five Star Movement		—	—	Giacomo Giannarelli
Passion for Tuscany (incl. NCD, UDC)		—	—	Giovanni Lamioni

== Results ==
31 May 2015 Tuscan regional election results
Candidates	Votes	%	Seats	Parties	Votes	%	Seats
Enrico Rossi	656,920	48.02	1				
Enrico Rossi	656,920	48.02	1	Democratic Party	614,869	45.93	24
Enrico Rossi	656,920	48.02	1	Tuscan People–Reformists 2020	22,760	1.70	–
Enrico Rossi	656,920	48.02	1	Total	637,629	47.63	24
Claudio Borghi	273,795	20.02	2				
Claudio Borghi	273,795	20.02	2	Northern League Tuscany	214,430	16.02	4
Claudio Borghi	273,795	20.02	2	Brothers of Italy	51,152	3.82	1
Claudio Borghi	273,795	20.02	2	Total	265,582	19.84	5
Giacomo Giannarelli	205,818	15.05	1	Five Star Movement	200,771	15.00	4
Stefano Mugnai	124,432	9.10	1				
Stefano Mugnai	124,432	9.10	1	Forza Italia	112,658	8.41	1
Stefano Mugnai	124,432	9.10	1	Lega Toscana–More Tuscany	7,996	0.60	–
Stefano Mugnai	124,432	9.10	1	Total	120.654	9.01	1
Tommaso Fattori	85,870	6.28	1	Tuscany to the Left	83,187	6.21	1
Giovanni Lamioni	17,146	1.27	–	Passion for Tuscany	15,837	1.18	–
Gabriele Chiurli	3,621	0.26	–	Direct Democracy	3,319	0.25	–
Total candidates	1,367,872	100.00	6	Total parties	1,326,979	100.00	35
Source: Ministry of the Interior – Historical Archive of Elections

== See also ==
- 2015 Italian regional elections
- List of members of the Regional Council of Tuscany, 2015–2020
