= Autonomists for Europe =

Italian political party

Autonomists for Europe Autonomisti per l'Europa
- President: Domenico Comino
- Coordinator: Vito Gnutti
- Founded: 23 January 2000
- Ideology: Federalism; Autonomism; Liberalism
- Political position: Centre

Website
- http://web.tiscali.it/federalisti/statuto.htm

Autonomists for Europe (Italian: Autonomisti per l'Europa, ApE) was a minor regionalist, Christian-democratic and liberal Italian political party. Founded in 2000 by splinters of Northern League as a potentially dangerous competitor, it became a rather marginal force.

The party was mainly composed by moderate members of the Northern League who wanted to join forces with Silvio Berlusconi's Forza Italia, at a time when the League was perceived to be closer to the centre-left. Its leading members were Vito Gnutti and Domenico Comino, both former Ministers for Northern League in the Berlusconi I Cabinet.

== History ==
The party was started as a federation of regional parties on the example of the Northern League: Lombardy Lombardy (Lombardia Lombardia) of Daniele Roscia, Future Veneto (Veneto Futuro) of Giuseppe Ceccato, Piedmontese Federalist Movement (Movimento Federalista Piemontese) of Domenico Comino, Federalist Movement Emilia (Movimento Federalista Emilia) of Giorgio Cavitelli, Julian Front (Fronte Giuliano) of Giorgio Marchesich, Future Liguria (Liguria Futura) of Roberto Avogadro and Tuscan Homelands (Patrie Toscane) of Norberto Catalani. Future Veneto eventually merged with the Liga Veneta Repubblica to form Veneti d'Europa and ceased to exist, while the Julian Front soon re-gained much of its independence.

Initially the party had five members in the Chamber of Deputies (Domenico Comino, Mario Lucio Barral, Franca Gambato, Daniele Roscia and Stefano Signorini) and six in the Senate (Vito Gnutti, Roberto Avogadro, Giuseppe Ceccato, Luciano Lago, Luciano Lorenzi and Donato Manfroi). Later, in the Senate, a parliamentarian joined (Walter Bianco) and prior to the 2001 general election the Autonomists formed a group with some members of European Democracy (Giovanni Polidoro, Ortensio Zecchino and Giulio Andreotti), which had split from the Italian People's Party. When the Northern League formed an alliance with Forza Italia and the other parties of the House of Freedoms, ApE lost its reason of existence.

At that time ApE was almost disbanded and most of its members joined the Union of Christian and Centre Democrats (UDC). What remains of the party took part only to local electoral contexts, often under the banner of other larger parties, such as the Italy of Values in Milan. At the national level the party generally supported The Union, the centre-left coalition led by Romano Prodi.
