= Andrea Paganella =

Italian politician (born 1974)

Member of the Senate
- Incumbent
- Assumed office 13 October 2022
- Constituency: Lazio – P02

Personal details
- Born: 3 December 1974 (age 51)
- Party: Lega

Andrea Paganella (born 3 December 1974) is an Italian politician serving as a member of the Senate since 2022. He has served as secretary of the Senate since 2022.

== Biography ==
Born in Roncoferraro(Mantua), he is a longtime associate and key figure in Matteo Salvini’s inner circle. He has held prominent positions, including head of Salvini’s political secretariat, election campaign coordinator, and assistant when Salvini was Minister of the Interior, as well as a partner with Luca Morisi in managing communications. He is a board member of the Italy–USA Foundation.

In the 2022 early general elections, he ran for the Senate of the Republic (Italy), appearing in third position on the “Lega per Salvini Premier” lists in the Lazio - 02 multi-member district, and was elected to the Senate. During the 19th Legislature of the Republic, he served as secretary of the Senate Presiding Board, elected on October 19 with 86 votes, as well as a member of the 7th Committee on Culture and Cultural Heritage, public education—where he also served as a substitute for Undersecretary of State Lucia Borgonzoni—the Parliamentary Commission on Children and Adolescents, and the Parliamentary Commission of Inquiry into the disappearances of Disappearance of Emanuela Orlandi and Disappearance of Mirella Gregori.
