= Giulio Centemero =

Italian politician (born 1979)

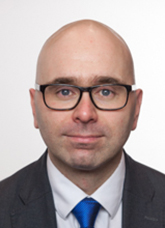
- Centemero in 2018

Member of the Chamber of Deputies
- Incumbent
- Assumed office 23 March 2018
- Constituency: Lombardy 3 – 02 (2018–2022); Lombardy 3 – 01 (2022–present)

Personal details
- Born: 30 January 1979 (age 47)
- Party: Lega
- Relatives: Elena Centemero (cousin)

Giulio Centemero (born 30 January 1979) is an Italian politician serving as a member of the Chamber of Deputies since 2018. He is the cousin of Elena Centemero.
