= Lega Toscana =

- Secretary: Andrea Crippa (federal commissioner)
- President: Vacant
- Founded: 1987 (as MpT); 1988 (as AT); 1991 (as LNT); 2020 (as LT)
- Ideology: Regionalism; Federalism; Populism
- National affiliation: Lega Nord (1991–2020); Lega per Salvini Premier (2020–present)
- Regional Council of Tuscany: 1 / 41
- Chamber of Deputies (Tuscany seats): 6 / 38
- Senate (Tuscany seats): 3 / 18

Website
- Official website

Proposed flag of Toscana by Lega Nord Toscana

Lega Toscana (English: League Tuscany), whose complete name is Lega Toscana per Salvini Premier (English: League Tuscany for Salvini Premier), is a regionalist political party active in Tuscany. Established in 1987, it was one of the founding "national" sections of Lega Nord (LN) in 1991 and became the regional section of Lega per Salvini Premier (LSP) in Tuscany since 2020.

The party is currently led by federal commissioner Andrea Crippa.

== History ==
The party was founded in 1987 as the Movement for Tuscany (Movimento per la Toscana, MpT) and its first leader was Mario Forconi. In 1988, under the leadership of Tommaso Fragassi, the party changed name to Tuscan Alliance (Alleanza Toscana, AT).

AT participated to the 1989 European Parliament election within the coalition Lega Lombarda – Alleanza Nord. In 1989–1990 it took part in the process of federating the northern regionalist parties, ahead of the 1990 regional elections. In February 1991 the AT was merged into Lega Nord (LN), taking the current name, and since then it has been the regional section of that party in Tuscany.

In the 1992 and 1994 general election Riccardo Fragassi was elected to the Chamber of Deputies (in 1992 along with Gianmarco Mancini), while his father Tommaso resigned from secretary because he rejected the alliance between the LN and the centre-right Pole of Freedoms. In 1995, when the alliance was dissolved, Riccardo Fragassi left the party in opposition to that break-up and formed the Tuscan Federalist Alliance (AFT) instead. He would return into the fold ten years later. The leader of the AFT were Riccardo Fragassi (secretary) and Renzo Del Carrìa (president), a former president of the LNT (1992–1994). Riccardo Fragassi eventually re-joined the LNT and spoke at the Lega Nord's federal congress June–July 2012.

The party's new secretary, Simone Gnaga, was elected to the Chamber in the 1996 general election. A right-winger, he would too leave in 1998 in order to join National Alliance. Between 1998 and 2006 the party was led by Vincenzo Soldati, a member of the party's libertarian wing. The party was then led by commissioner Luca Rodolfo Paolini, national secretary of Lega Nord Marche, from 2006 to 2008, when Claudio Morganti was elected national secretary. In the 2008 general election the party elected a deputy, Paolini himself, after almost ten years of no representation in the Italian Parliament. In the 2009 European Parliament election Morganti was elected MEP. In the 2010 regional election the party won 6.5% of the vote, its best result so far, and entered the Regional Council for the first time, with four councillors.

Despite these electoral results, Morganti's leadership was openly contested by many party members. In April 2011 Dario Locci, a regional councillor, left in protest. In September 2011 Morganti resigned from secretary and was replaced by commissioner Gianni Fava. The move was not enough for Locci, who made no return, and another group of disgruntled members, including regional councillor Marina Staccioli, who left the party to form Tuscan Identity in December. The splinter party was led by president Giovanni Iadicicco and three coordinators (Andrea Asciutti, Federico Meanti and Marina Staccioli); Staccioli would later defect to the Brothers of Italy). In October 2012 the two remaining regional councillors of the party, Antonio Gambetta Vianna and Gian Luca Lazzeri, responded to the emphasis posed by the new federal secretary Roberto Maroni on the North and the establishment of a Padanian euroregion by changing the denomination of their group from "Lega Nord Toscana" to "More Tuscany". Vianna and Lazzeri were soon expelled from the party, which was left without regional councillors. In April 2013 also Morganti was expelled from the party. These internal clashes resulted in a dismal result in the 2013 general election, during which the LNT garnered a mere 0.7% of the vote. In April 2013, after a long transition under the supervision of Fava, a new national congress was held and Manuel Vescovi was elected new national secretary.

In the 2015 regional election the LNT obtained its best result so far in a regionwide election by jumping from 6.5% of 2010 to 16.2%, while its candidate for president, anti-Euro economist Claudio Borghi, who was endorsed also by Brothers of Italy, came second with 20.0% of the vote. In the 2016 local elections the party won Cascina (Pisa), its first large municipality in the region: Susanna Ceccardi obtained 28.4% in the first round and 50.3% in the run-off, while the party got 21.3%.

In the 2018 general election the party won 17.4% of the vote in Tuscany. In the subsequent 2018 local elections the party ran well in several races, especially in Pisa and Massa where two of its members, Michele Conti and Francesco Persiani. respectively, were elected mayors. In the 2019 European Parliament election the party reached a record 31.5% of the vote, while in the 2020 regional election, with Ceccardi as the centre-right candidate for president, it stopped at 21.8% (Ceccardi won 40.5%).

Following the formation of Lega per Salvini Premier and the 2019 federal congress of the LN, after which the latter became practically inactive, in February 2020 the LNT was re-established as Lega Toscana per Salvini Premier in order to become the regional section of the new party. The founding members of the new LR were Ceccardi, Tiziana Nisini, Elisa Montemagni, Jacopo Alberti and Elena Vizzotto. After that, the party was successively led by Mario Lolini and, since 2023, Luca Baroncini.

In the 2023 regional congress, Baroncini was elected secretary by obtaining around 60% of the vote, while his opponent Luca Tacchi won around 35%.

== Popular support ==
Lega Nord Toscana has been one of the weakest national sections of the federal party and had received only low digits until the 2015 regional election, in which it obtained its best result so far (16.2%). The party was particularly strong in the provinces of Lucca (20.2%), Pisa (19.1%) and Grosseto (18.9%).

The electoral results of Lega Nord Toscana in the region are shown in the tables below.

1990 regional	1992 general	1994 general	1995 regional	1996 general	1999 European	2000 regional	2001 general	2004 European	2005 regional	2006 general	2008 general	2009 European	2010 regional
0.8	3.1	2.2	0.7	1.8	0.6	0.6	0.6	0.8	1.3	1.1	2.0	4.3	6.5

2013 general	2014 European	2015 regional	2018 general	2019 European	2020 regional	2022 general	2024 European
0.7	2.6	16.2	17.4	31.5	21.8	6.6	6.2

== Leadership ==
- Secretary: Mario Forconi (1987–1988), Tommaso Fragassi (1988–1994), Simone Gnaga (1994–1998), Vincenzo Soldati (1998–2006), Luca Rodolfo Paolini (commissioner 2006–2008), Claudio Morganti (2008–2011), Gianni Fava (commissioner, 2011–2013), Manuel Vescovi (2013–2018), Susanna Ceccardi (commissioner 2018–2019), Daniele Belotti (commissioner 2019–2020), Mario Lolini (commissioner 2020–2023), Luca Baroncini (2023–2025, commissioner 2023), Andrea Crippa (2025–present)
- President: Tommaso Fragassi (1987–1988), Guido Niccolini (1988–1992), Renzo Del Carrìa (1992–1994), Dario Locci (1994–1996), Emilio Paradiseo (1996–1998), Walter Gherardini (1998–2001), Moreno Menconi (2001–2006), Antonio Gambetta Vianna (2008–2011), Francesco Pellati (2013–2018)
