= Silvia Sardone =

Italian politician and MEP

Silvia Sardone MEP

Member of the European Parliament for North-West Italy
- Incumbent
- Assumed office 2 July 2019

Personal details
- Born: 25 December 1982 (age 43) Milan, Italy
- Party: League (2018–present)
- Other political affiliations: FI (2006–2009); PdL (2009–2013); FI (2013–2018)
- Spouses: Roberto Di Stefano (divorced) Davide Carlo Caparini (m. 2023)
- Children: 2
- Education: Bocconi University (Degree); University of Modena and Reggio Emilia (PhD); Polytechnic University of Milan (Master's degree)
- Website: www.silviasardone.it

Silvia Serafina Sardone (born 25 December 1982) is an Italian politician and a Member of the European Parliament since 2019. She is the deputy secretary of Lega, a right-wing populist political party in Italy.

== Biography ==
Silvia Sardone was born in Milan.

She graduated in Law at Bocconi University in 2007; subsequently she won a scholarship for the research doctorate of the international school in labor relations at the University of Modena and Reggio Emilia (Marco Biagi University Foundation). She got a master's degree in Business administration at the Polytechnic University of Milan.

From 2010 to 2014 she was first a board member and then the president of Afol (Agency for training and career guidance) of the Province of Milan.

In 2006 she was elected, as member of Forza Italia, to the Council of Zone 2 of Milan, where she remained for 10 years. In 2016 she was a candidate for the Milan City Council, where she was elected with 2,319 preference votes.

In 2018 she was a candidate for the Regional Council of Lombardy and was elected with 11,312 preference votes. In the summer of 2018 she decided to leave Forza Italia, declaring that she no longer recognized herself in the policies carried out by the party at national level and joined the Mixed Group, both in the Municipality and in the Region.

In 2019 she was candidate for MEP on the League list and she has been elected with about 45,000 preferences. She was reelected in 2024 with over 75,000 preferences, a record for the League.

On 23 October 2023, Sardone was placed under police protection following death threats against her and her children due to her outspoken anti–Islam views and opposition to Islamic veils, clandestine mosques, and her claims about the Islamisation of Europe. In response, she stated that Islamic extremists "find it particularly disturbing that a free woman, not a submissive and silent woman as they would like, is expressing ideas." In 2025, she helped announce the League's resolution to "prevent Islamisation" of Italian schools and banning the wearing of veils by girls. In September 2026, Prime Minister Giorgia Meloni followed through Sardone's announcing Italy is preparing legislation to ban face covering, specifically burqas and niqabs.

She is climate coordinator for the Patriots for Europe group in the European Parliament where she bid successfully to lead the Parliament's file on the EU's 2040 climate targets.

== Personal life ==
She has 2 children and was married to the mayor of Sesto San Giovanni Roberto Di Stefano.
