= Lega (political party) =

Italian political party

League Lega
- Abbreviation: LSP / LpSP
- Secretary: Matteo Salvini
- Deputy Secretaries: vacant
- Founders: Matteo Salvini; Roberto Calderoli; Giancarlo Giorgetti; Lorenzo Fontana; Giulio Centemero
- Founded: 14 December 2017; 8 years ago
- Preceded by: Lega Nord (inactive); Us with Salvini (disbanded)
- Headquarters: Via Carlo Bellerio 41, Milan
- Student wing: Lega Universitaria
- Youth wing: Lega Giovani
- Membership (2021): 100,000+
- Ideology: Right-wing populism; Conservatism; Nationalism; Regionalism; Federalism; Factions: Padanian nationalism
- Political position: Right-wing to far-right
- National affiliation: Centre-right coalition
- European affiliation: Patriots.eu
- European Parliament group: ID Group (2019–2024); PfE (since 2024)
- Colours: Blue (official); Green (customary)
- Chamber of Deputies: 54 / 400
- Senate: 30 / 205
- European Parliament: 7 / 76
- Regional Councils: 89 / 896
- Conference of Regions: 4 / 21

Website
- legaonline.it
- Politics of Italy; Political parties; Elections; a: Green was the official colour of Lega Nord until 2018, when blue was adopted. Despite this, green is still widely used to represent also the new Lega in charts and maps.

Lega (lit. 'League'), officially named Lega per Salvini Premier (lit. 'League for Salvini Premier', LSP or LpSP), is a right-wing populist political party in Italy, whose founder and leader is Matteo Salvini. The LSP is the informal successor of Lega Nord. The LSP was established in December 2017 as the sister party of the LN, active in northern Italy, and as the replacement of Us with Salvini (NcS), LN's previous affiliate in central and southern Italy. The new party aimed at offering LN's values and policies to the rest of the country. Some political commentators described the LSP as a parallel party of the LN, with the aim of politically replacing it, also because of its statutory debt of €49 million.

Since January 2020, the LN has become mostly inactive and was practically supplanted by the LSP, which is active all around Italy. The LSP came third in the 2018 Italian general election and first in the 2019 European Parliament election in Italy. Like the LN, the LSP is a confederation of regional parties, of which the largest and long-running are Liga Veneta (LV) and Lega Lombarda (LL), established in 1980 and 1984, respectively. Despite misgivings within the party's Padanian nationalist faction, the political base of the LSP is in northern Italy, where the party gets most of its support and where it has maintained the traditional autonomist outlook of the LN, especially in Lombardy and Veneto.

After a disappointing result in the 2022 Italian general election, the party joined the Meloni government with five ministers, including Giancarlo Giorgetti as minister of Economy and Finance and Salvini as deputy prime minister and minister of Infrastructure and Transport. The LSP also participates in 14 regional governments, including those of the two autonomous provinces. Three regional presidents, Attilio Fontana (Lombardy), Alberto Stefani (Veneto) and Massimiliano Fedriga (Friuli-Venezia Giulia), who is also the president of the Conference of Regions and Autonomous Provinces, are party members. Other leading figures include Lorenzo Fontana (president of the Chamber of Deputies), Roberto Calderoli (minister for regional affairs and autonomies), Luca Zaia (former president of Veneto and current president of its Regional Council) and Maurizio Fugatti (president of Trentino).

== History ==
=== Background ===
Lega Nord (LN) was established in 1989 as a federation of six regional parties from northern and north-central Italy (Liga Veneta, Lega Lombarda, Piemont Autonomista, Uniun Ligure, Lega Emiliano-Romagnola and Alleanza Toscana), which became the party's founding "national" sections in 1991. Umberto Bossi was the party's founder and later long-time federal secretary. The LN long advocated the transformation of Italy from a unitary state to a federation, fiscal federalism, regionalism and greater regional autonomy, especially for northern regions. At times, the party proposed the secession of the North, which the party referred to as "Padania", and consequently Padanian nationalism. The party consistently opposed illegal immigration and often adopted Eurosceptic stances, finally joining the Identity and Democracy group in the European Parliament in 2019. Throughout its history, the LN formed alliances both with centre-right and centre-left parties, but, in general elections, it was usually part of Silvio Berlusconi's centre-right coalition and, occasionally, ran as a stand-alone party (in 1996, gaining its best-so-far result: 10.1% of the vote). In the North, several regions were led by LN members, including Veneto (since 2010) and Lombardy (since 2013).

In December 2013, Matteo Salvini, a member of the European Parliament and former editor-in-chief of Radio Padania Libera, was elected federal secretary of the LN, after having prevailed over Bossi in a leadership election. To revive a party overwhelmed by scandals and which had reached historical lows in the 2013 Italian general election, Salvini led the LN through dramatic changes, first by re-orienting it toward the European nationalist right. In the run-up of the 2014 European Parliament election, Salvini formed an alliance with the French National Front led by Marine Le Pen, the Dutch Party for Freedom led by Geert Wilders and other alike parties on the issues of Euroscepticism, opposition to immigration and sovereigntism, leading to the establishment of the Identity and Democracy Party (ID Party). The League also started a brief co-operation with CasaPound, a far-right organisation. In December 2014 Salvini launched Us with Salvini (Italian: Noi con Salvini, NcS), with goal of putting forward LN's issues in central and southern Italy and expanding the party's electorate.

=== Road to the new party ===
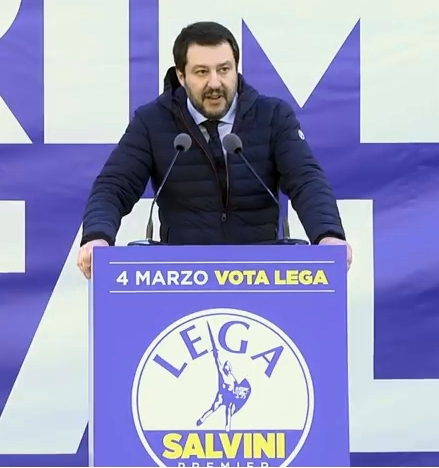
Matteo Salvini during the final rally of the 2018 electoral campaign in Milan

In the 2017 leadership election, Salvini was confirmed as LN's leader, defeating Gianni Fava, from the party's traditionalist wing. The May 2017 federal congress marked the "national" turnaround. In October 2017, Salvini announced that in the 2018 Italian general election the party would be re-branded simply as "Lega" and would field lists also in central-southern Italy. On 14 December 2017, the "Lega per Salvini Premier" party was established by long-time LN member Roberto Calderoli and its constitution was published in the Gazzetta Ufficiale. LSP's official goals were the transformation of Italy "into a modern federal state through democratic and electoral methods" and the support of "the freedom and sovereignty of peoples at the European level". LSP's symbol was inspired by Donald Trump's campaign for the 2016 Republican Party presidential primaries in the United States: a blue rectangle with the words "Lega per Salvini Premier" in white, surrounded by a thin white frame. A week later, Salvini presented the new electoral logo: the word "Nord", and the Sun of the Alps were removed, while the word "Lega" and the representation of Alberto da Giussano remained, and the slogan "Salvini Premier" was added.

In the 2018 general election, the League gained its best-so-far result of 17.4% of the vote, becoming the largest party within the centre-right coalition and establishing itself as the country's third largest political force. After the election, the party formed an alliance with the populist Five Star Movement (M5S), which had come first in the election with 32.7% of the vote. The "yellow-green government" was led by Giuseppe Conte, an independent jurist close to the M5S, and included Salvini as minister of the Interior. Since the government's formation, thanks to Salvini's approval as minister, the party was regularly the country's largest party in opinion polls, at around or over 30%. In the 2019 European Parliament election in Italy, the League won 34.3% of the vote, winning for the first time a plurality of the electorate, while the M5S stopped at 17.1%. In August 2019, Salvini announced his intention to leave the coalition with the M5S, and called for a snap general election.

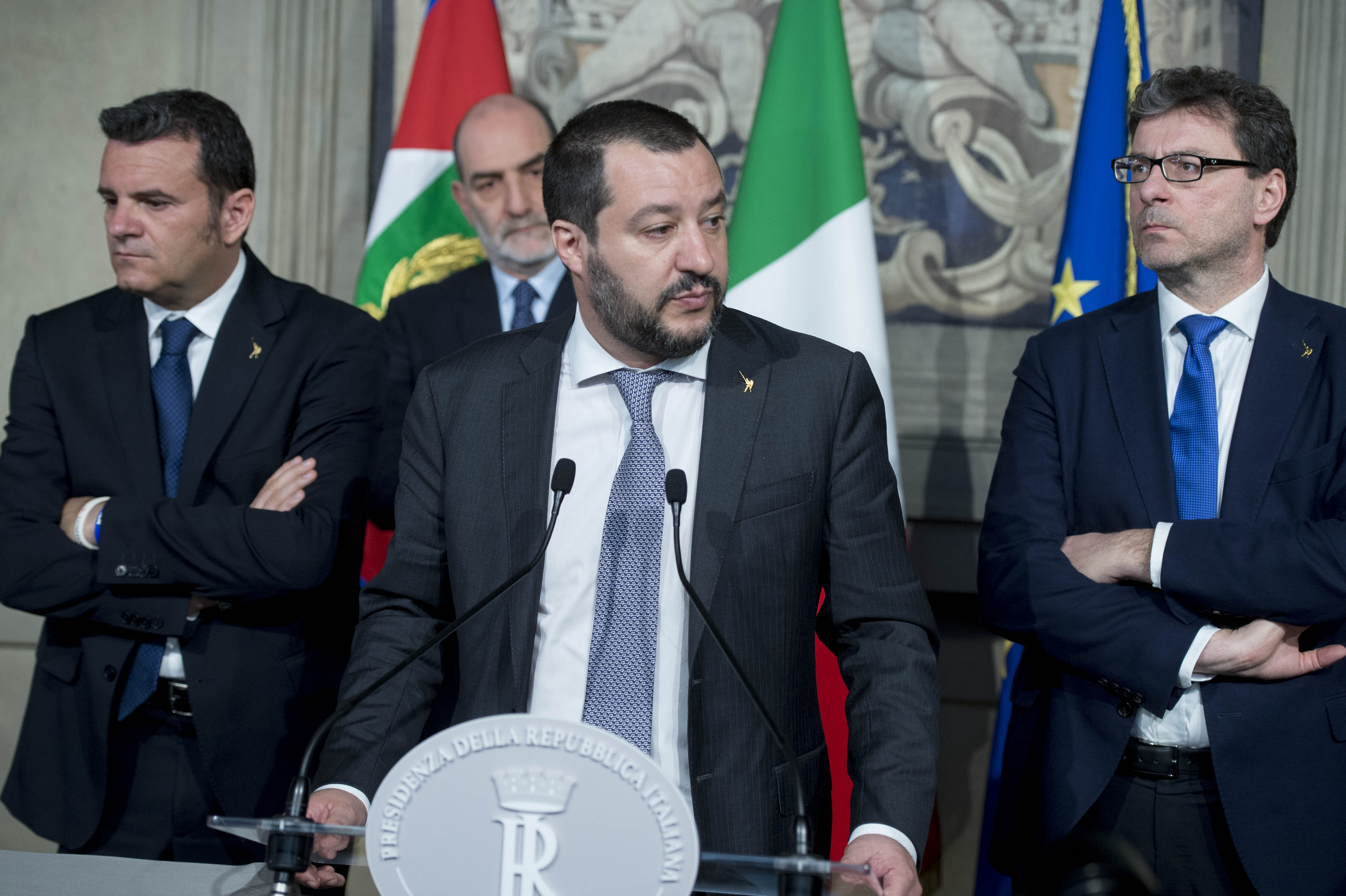
Salvini, Gian Marco Centinaio, and Giancarlo Giorgetti at the Quirinal Palace after the 2018 election

After successful talks between the M5S and the Democratic Party (PD), the incumbent government was eventually replaced by the second Conte government. The League thus returned to the opposition, together with its electoral allies of the centre-right coalition. During 2019, along with the LN's membership recruitment in the Centre-North, the party launched a parallel drive in the Centre-South for the LSP, practically supplanting NcS. Finally, during a federal congress on 21 December 2019, the party's constitution underwent some major changes, including reduced powers for the federal president, the extension of the federal secretary's and federal council's terms from three to five years, the introduction of "dual membership" and the faculty given to the federal council to grant the use of the party's symbol to other political parties. With the end of its membership drive in August 2020, the LSP became active throughout Italy. The LN, unable to be dissolved because of its burden of €49 million debt to the Italian state, was instead formally kept alive, while its membership cards were donated to former activists.

=== 2020 regional elections and aftermath ===
Salvini's popularity was supposed to create better chances for the League to continue its winning streak in regional elections (the latest being the 2019 regional election in Umbria, where Donatella Tesei was elected president with 57.6% of the vote and the League obtained 37.0%), particularly in Emilia-Romagna, a large region long-governed by the centre-left coalition. However, in the 2020 Emilia-Romagna regional election the party's candidate, Lucia Borgonzoni, stopped at 43.6% of the vote and was defeated by incumbent president Stefano Bonaccini (PD). The League's list obtained 32.0% and came second after the PD. The LSP, which had already peaked in opinion polls after quitting the yellow-green government, continued a slow decline in opinion polls and would be eventually eclipsed both by the PD and the FdI during 2021.

In the 2020 Venetian regional election, Luca Zaia, whose popularity was the result of a long-term focus on his home-region Veneto, was re-elected for a third consecutive term with 76.8% of the vote; Liga Veneta fielded two lists, including the League's official one and Zaia's personal list, which obtained 16.9% and 44.6%, respectively. In the Tuscan regional election, League's candidate Susanna Ceccardi was defeated in her bid to become president of Tuscany. The fact that the League had grown electorally only in Veneto and had lost appeal in other regions started to weaken Salvini's leadership, which was more or less silently contested by the "centrist" wing of the party formed by Giancarlo Giorgetti, Zaia and all of the party's regional presidents, from Lombardy's Attilio Fontana to Friuli-Venezia Giulia's Massimiliano Fedriga, who would become president of the Conference of Regions and Autonomous Provinces in 2021.

=== Draghi national unity government ===
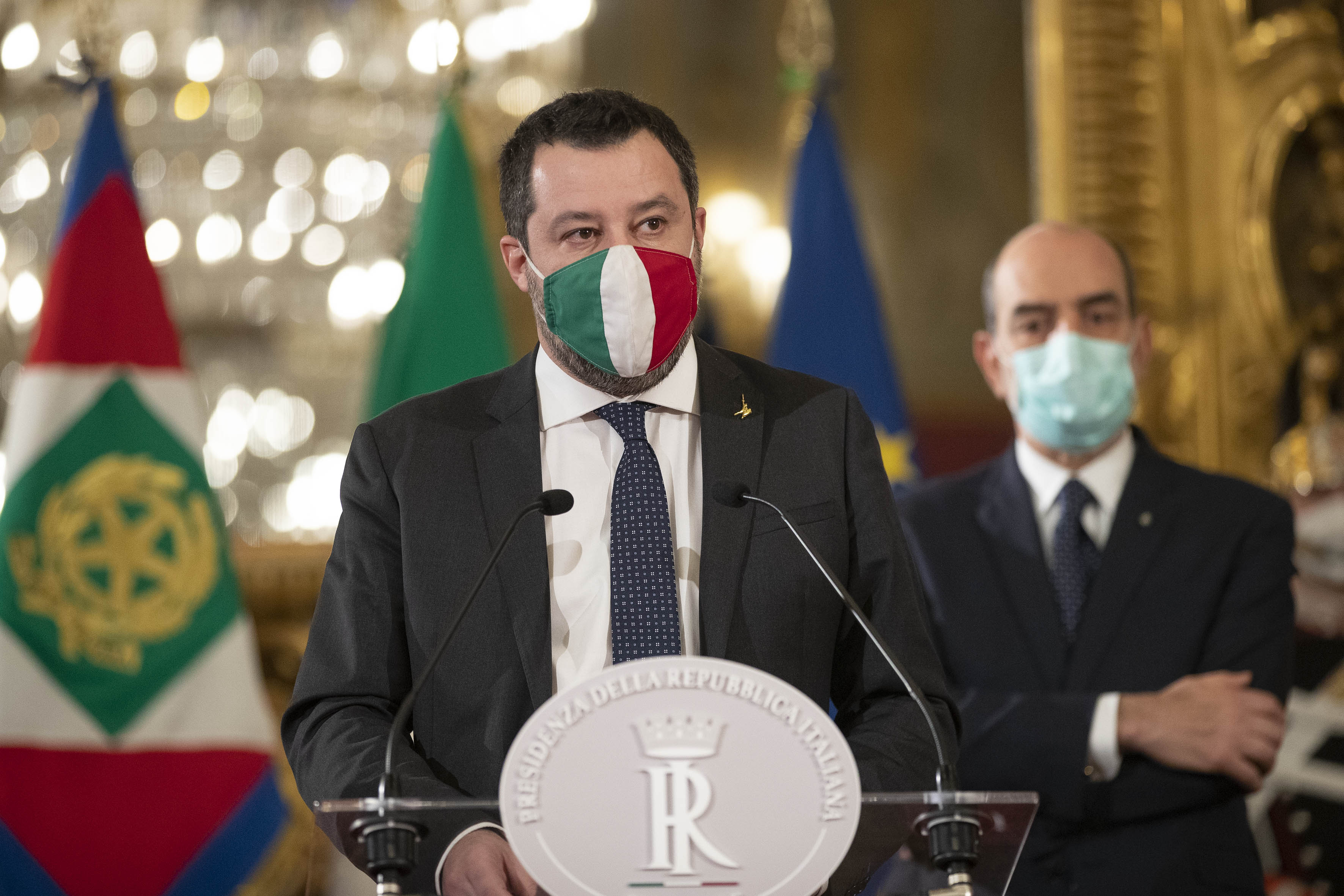
Salvini at the Quirinal Palace in January 2021

In January 2021, Conte's second government fell after losing support from Matteo Renzi's Italia Viva party. Subsequently, President Sergio Mattarella appointed Mario Draghi to form a cabinet, which won support from the League, the M5S, the PD and FI. The League entered the new government with three high-profile ministers from the party's "centrist" wing: Giorgetti, the architect of the party's pro-Europeanist turn and close friend of Draghi, as minister of Economic Development, Massimo Garavaglia as minister of Tourism and Erika Stefani as minister for Disabilities. The party's support for Draghi's government stood in contrast to its Eurosceptic stances.

In June 2021, Salvini proposed a federation with FI and other centre-right parties supporting Draghi (thus excluding FdI), which has so far went nowhere, as well as a campaign for six referendums on justice along with the liberal Radical Party. In February 2022, five of the six referendums were approved by Italy's Constitutional Court, opening the way for a popular vote by June.

In the run-up to the 2022 Italian local elections, the party launched a new organisation named Italy First (Italian: Prima l'Italia) in southern Italy. The League ran under the "Italy First" banner in most southern cities and in the 2022 Sicilian regional election. According to Calderoli, who registered the new symbol on Salvini's behalf, Italy First could eventually become a new political party, possibly including also FI and other centrist parties. However, as the notion of replacing the League's symbol also in northern Italy was criticised by several party members, especially in Veneto, Calderoli ruled it out.

=== 2022 general election and Meloni government ===
In July 2022, the M5S did not participate in a Senate's confidence vote on a government bill. Prime Minister Draghi offered his resignation, which was rejected by President Mattarella. After a few days, Draghi sought a confidence vote again to secure the government majority supporting his cabinet, while rejecting the proposal put forward by Lega and FI of a new government without the M5S. In that occasion, the League, despite calls from its regional presidents to do otherwise, as well as the M5S, FI and FdI, did not participate in the vote. Consequently, Draghi tendered his final resignation to President Mattarella, who dissolved the houses of Parliament, leading to a snap election.

In the 2022 general election, the League, which was part of the winning centre-right coalition, won 8.8% of the vote, compared to 26.0% gained by the Brothers of Italy (FdI) and 8.1% by FI. As a result, Giorgia Meloni, leader of FdI, accepted the task of forming a new government and announced the Meloni government, which assumed official functions after each minister was sworn in on 22 October. The League joined the new government with five ministers: Giorgetti minister of Economy and Finance, Salvini deputy prime minister and minister of Infrastructure and Transport, Giuseppe Valditara (a former aide to Gianfranco Miglio and co-author of the party's liberal-conservative manifesto) minister of Education, Calderoli minister for Regional Affairs and Autonomies, and Alessandra Locatelli minister for Disabilities. Prior to that, Lorenzo Fontana, from the conservative wing of the League, had been elected President of the Chamber of Deputies.

=== Internal debates and 2023 Lombard regional election ===
In the wake of the disappointing result in the 2022 general election and the run-up to the 2023 Lombard regional election, some leading members of the party's traditional wing, rooted in Padanian nationalism, formed Comitato Nord (English: Northern Committee, CN). The Committee was inspired by Umberto Bossi and, under the leadership of Paolo Grimoldi, a former leader of Lega Lombarda, and Angelo Ciocca, a member of the European Parliament, it attracted more than one thousand members in a couple of months. The inaugural event of the Committee, held in early December, was attended by some 600 people, including former ministers Roberto Castelli and Francesco Speroni. Contextually, provincial congresses were held in some of the party's strongholds: critics of Salvini affiliated with the CN narrowly won in Bergamo and Brescia, while the pro-Salvini wing retained Varese for a handful of votes and Roberto Marcato, a regional minister loyal to Zaia, was leading the challenge in Veneto. Also, four regional councillors affiliated with the CN formed a separate group in the Regional Council of Lombardy and were subsequently ejected from the party. In the meantime, another group of dissidents, led by Gianni Fava, who lost to Salvini in the 2017 Lega Nord leadership election and never joined the new party, formed the "Lombard Autonomist Movement" and supported Letizia Moratti for president, along with the separatists of Great North, in the regional election.

In the election, held in February 2023, A. Fontana was re-elected president with 54.7% of the vote, 20pp more than his closest opponent (while Moratti was a distant third and would return to FI one year later), as well as improving the 2018's tally. While FdI became the region's largest party with 25.2%, the combined score of the Lombard League and Fontana's personal list was 22.7%. Also the CN, whose members might have voted Fontana's list in protest according to some sources, rejoiced, while being worried by FdI's largest party status. Contextually, the centre-right coalition won also in the 2023 Lazio regional election, in which the League obtained 8.5% of the vote.

In June 2023, the LV held its congress: Marcato retired from the race when Franco Manzato emerged as an alternative opposition candidate. At the congress, outgoing federal commissioner Alberto Stefani, a loyalist of Salvini, was thus elected secretary with 64% of the vote against Manzato's 36%, possibly with Zaia's silent support. The congress's result stabilised the regional party, but did not silence internal critics, and several minor figures left the party, some of them joining FI, which had been led in Veneto by former LV leader Flavio Tosi since June 2022. and had become that party's regional coordinator in March 2023, In Lombardy, Castelli started his own People's Party of the North in November.

=== 2024 European election and 2025 federal congress ===
In the run-up of the 2024 European Parliament election, Salvini invited Marine Le Pen to the party's traditional rally in Pontida in September 2023 and organised a conference of the Identity and Democracy Party in Florence in December 2023. The party also tried to forge a big-tent, by wooing popular mayors and regional presidents like Zaia, maximizing the right-wing vote by fielding general Roberto Vannacci and broadening toward the political centre by welcoming longtime centrist MEP Aldo Patriciello, the Union of the Centre and the Italian Liberal Party. In the end, neither Fedriga nor Zaia chose to stand, while Vannacci accepted to be a candidate, despite strong reservations by virtually all senior members of the party. In the meantime, a group of former LN members, led by Tosi, formed the "Forza Nord" coalition within FI: these included Alessandro Sorte (leader of FI in Lombardy), Roberto Cota (former president of Piedmont), Marco Reguzzoni (former floor leader of the LN in the Chamber of Deputies), Massimiliano Bastoni (former member of LN's right-wing, as well as lately of the CN), Matteo Gazzini (outgoing MEP and leader of FI in South Tyrol) and Stefania Zambelli (outgoing MEP). Furthermore, Grimoldi revealed that Bossi was going to vote for FI too.

The party's share of the vote was 9.0%, with Vannacci (500,000+ preference votes) being one of the most voted candidates in the election. The party improved its tally in the South, also thanks to candidates like Patriciello and Raffaele Stancanelli, but suffered in its traditional northern strongholds, where the party fared even worse than in the 2022 general election. Contextually, in the 2024 Piedmontese regional election the party won a mere 9.4% of the vote, while being part of the winning centre-right coalition led by incumbent president Alberto Cirio. Right after, long-time internal critic Grimoldi was ejected from the party. In October Grimoldi launched the Pact for the North, which was joined by Roberto Bernardelli (Padanian Union–Great North), Mario Borghezio, Giuseppe Leoni, Giancarlo Pagliarini and other dissidents of Lega Nord and Lega, while Bossi was appointed honorary president.

In December 2024, Massimiliano Romeo was elected secretary of Lega Lombarda unopposed, after that Luca Toccalini, Salvini's candidate, had withdrawn from the race due to lack of support. In his victory speech, Romeo reclaimed the party's northern identity, while president of Lombardy A. Fontana spoke of "free Padania". In April 2025, the party held its long-awaited federal congress in Florence. Salvini was re-elected secretary unopposed. Of the 22 elective members of the federal council, the party's governing board, six (plus one representing Lazio) were Lombards, four Venetians, four from other northern regions, three from central Italy and four from the South. During the congress, which was presided over by minister Giorgetti, Vannacci formally became a member of the party. International speakers included Elon Musk. In May, Salvini appointed four deputy secretaries: A. Stefani, also leader of the party in Veneto, and Claudio Durigon, who were confirmed in their roles, as well as Silvia Sardone and Vannacci, two new entries.

=== 2025 regional elections ===
During 2025, a string of 2025 regional elections took place. The League has so far had generally disappointing results. In Aosta Valley the party, whose dissidents had set up the Valdostan Rally or joined Future Aosta Valley, won 8.4% of the vote (–15.5 pp), in Marche 7.4% (–15.0 pp), in Calabria 9.4% (+1.1 pp) and Tuscany 4.4% (–17.4 pp). The latter defeat was almost universally ascribed to Vannacci, who had led the campaign, sidelining some leading members, and was accused of denaturing the party's message with his excessively right-wing rhetoric.

All eyes and the party's hopes were thus directed toward the upcoming election in Veneto, the party's ultimate stronghold and one of the last three regions to vote in 2025, along with Apulia and Campania. The League long tried to change the law in order to allow term-limited Zaia to run again, as well as fielding Zaia's personal list, under which most of the party's regional councillors had been elected in 2020, but FdI and FI did not agree. However, the party was successful in obtaining the nomination of A. Stefani, regional secretary of the LV, as the coalition's joint candidate for President of Veneto. Unable to run again for the top job, Zaia announced that he would lead the party in all seven provinces. In the run-up of the election, Zaia also floated the idea of restructuring the federal party under the CDU/CSU model, with the current League and a northern regionalist party centred around the LV. In the election, Stefani was elected President by a landslide 64.4% of the vote and the LV was confirmed the largest in the region with 36.3% of the vote, outperforming the FdI (18.7%) against all odds. Zaia obtained 203,054 (write-in) preferences, the all-time record in Italian regional elections, and was later elected President of the Regional Council. Contextually, the party obtained 8.0% in Apulia and 5.5% in Campania.

=== Internal tensions and crisis ===
In February 2026 deputy secretary Roberto Vannacci, who had become quite isolated after the Tuscan election, left to launch the hard-right National Future. Vannacci was followed by a handful of elected officials (mostly newcomers with no roots in Lega Nord) and the news was greeted with satisfaction by most of the party's leaders, from Zaia to A. Fontana, from Fedriga to Riccardo Molinari. Successively, the party's federal council marked a pro-Europeanist and autonomist turnaround.

In March Umberto Bossi, founder of Lega Nord and dean of the LSP's parliamentary groups, died at 84. The funeral was held in Pontida, location of the party's rallies since 1990, and managed chiefly by minister Giancarlo Giorgetti, who was seen as the late founder's heir apparent. Salvini paid tribute to the former leader by wearing the green shirt of the old days, but was contested by some of the participants (including members of the aforementioned Pact for the North and the People's Party of the North), who also sang Lega Nord's old chants. Despite the divisions displayed at the funeral and his own criticism on Salvini, not to mention the decision to open the party to Vannacci and "fascists", Giuseppe Leoni (along with Bossi, one of the founding members of Lega Lombarda in 1984) promised to bring forward Bossi's testament of re-uniting all of the old party's stripes.

In April the party held a demonstration along with representatives of Patriots.eu in Milan. Envisioned in a different context — before Vannacci's exit and Bossi's death (the founder of Lega Nord was mentioned by Salvini in his speech) —, the event moved from the initial idea of a "remigration summit" to a more generic rally. Salvini himself played down the extremist image of the event, saying that "all the controversy over the remigration summit, racism and Islamophobia [were] left-wing hysteria" and that there would "be none of that". Among others, Molinari explained that "the League is not Vox, Fidesz or the National [Rally], we're together because we share the same position against this European Commission, but we have different roots and histories" and, on Vannacci, that "he is a right-wing extremist. His departure was a good thing, we won't miss him. [...] The League has nothing to do with those who praise the X Mas or God, country and family".

Following the party's declining support and growing discontent within its ranks, a June's meeting of the federal council in Rome was supposed to lead to an agreement on the party's re-organisation through amendments to its statute with the goal of re-creating an autonomous norther section, but ended in nothing, maintaining the distance between Salvini on one side and Zaia, A. Fontana and Fedriga on the other. In early August, during a meeting of Lega Lombarda's board, five leading participants called for Salvini to step down, while twenty other participants, including A. Fontana and Romeo, were highly critical of him. During the summer both A. Fontana and Romeo released critical interviews on Salvini, while touring a book by Romeo on the party's renewal. As a result, Salvini organised some meetings with Zaia, A. Fontana, Fedriga and Fugatti in order to prevent tensions at the party's annual rally in Pontida in September. Despite criticism within the party, according to one poll, a vast majority of the party's remaining voters (between 62% and 89%), as well as 54% of centre-right voters, supported Salvini as party leader. According to another poll, Salvini was supported by 87% of the party's voters (second only to Zaia, at 92%), but he was the main reason why previous voters had defected (only 22% of 2019 former voted still supported him). In Pontida, Salvini, where his critics insisted on the need on a renewed focus on the North and centrist voters (Zaia reclaimed the party's liberal roots, as opposed to Silvia Sardone who said she did not want a "centrist" League), announced that he would seek a new mandate during a federal congress to be summoned in October.

In the run-up of the extraordinary congress, former minister Massimo Garavaglia launched his bid to replace Salvini, with the goal of moving the party away "from the stereotype of being far-right because that simply isn't the case; our electorate is broad and cross-cutting" and reaffirming a "pragmatic League, that, on certain social issues, it is even further to the left than the left itself, while championing a genuine federalist agenda and sound liberal policies". Garavaglia was vocally supported by A. Fontana and Romeo, while Zaia, Fedriga and Fugatti supported neither him and Salvini, but signed a joint resolution on the party's northern identity and outlook put forward by Molinari. In October, in Milan, Salvini was re-elected secretary with the support of 76% of delegates, while Garavaglia received 24% of the vote (one delegate in seven was absent). During the congress, presided by L. Fontana, Salvini unveiled the new symbol (Lega Italia Federale instead of Lega Salvini Premier) and the party's statute was amended with the provision of a political secretariat and a coordinator of the regional secretariats.

In the weeks following the congress, tensions did not entirely disappear. The scheduled provincial congresses were suspended and postponed, with the exception of the one in Varese, where the anti-Salvini faction prevailed. In November, Romeo was ousted as leader in the Senate. Meanwhile, Salvini has been slow to assemble his political secretariat, particularly following Garavaglia's refusal to join and Zaia's hesitation.

== Ideology, platform and factions ==
Internationally, the League is usually described as a right-wing or far-right party. Its robust anti-immigration stance, Eurosceptic outlook, and populist rhetoric are frequently mentioned as central factors in this categorisation. According to Miles Johnson of the Financial Times, most Italian media endorse the party's description as centre-right, which is how the League promotes itself. The far-right label is rejected altogether by the party, including by Matteo Salvini himself. According to Antonio Polito, columnist for the Corriere della Sera and a former centre-left politician, the League is "at least half centrist, surely it is entirely centrist in Veneto and Lombardy, both as electorate and political culture of its governors".

Differently from the right-wing Salvini, most leading members, such as Giancarlo Giorgetti, Luca Zaia, and Massimiliano Fedriga, are frequently described as centrist, moderate, and pro-Europeanist, appealing to centrist voters and parties. Of the leader's long-time three deputy secretaries, Giorgetti represented the liberal-centrist wing, Lorenzo Fontana the Catholic, traditionalist, and social-conservative one, and Andrea Crippa the populist to right-wing populist one. Fault lines are more complicate, as Giorgetti is also a devout Catholic, Fontana has voiced concerns over the party's European alliances, and Crippa is outspokenly in favour of abortion and euthanasia. On the progressive end of the party's political spectrum sits Zaia, former president of Veneto, who holds a liberal approach on a variety of issues, from immigration to assisted suicide, while maintaining a traditional autonomism standpoint.

While continuing to support autonomism, regionalism, and federalism, the League under Salvini has gradually but decidedly set aside Padanian nationalism and separatism, which were long pursued by Lega Nord. Through sovereigntism, the party began to make greater inroads in southern Italy by the late 2010s. It is debated among academics whether the League has embraced Italian nationalism, and thus abandoned regionalism, or whether it combines nationalism and regionalism, similarly to the Ticino League in Switzerland. According to Daniele Albertazzi, Arianna Giovannini, and Antonella Seddone, "regionalism has been replaced by an empty form of nativist nationalism, which fails to address socio-economic issues related to the North–South divide", while "populism remains central to the party's strategic communication, but the EU has taken Rome's place as the people's 'enemy.'" Locally, the regional parties forming the League continue to be supportive of regional identities, such as Venetian nationalism in Veneto and Lombard nationalism in Lombardy. The League supports the implementation of article 116 of the Constitution, the "differentiated" or "asymmetrical" regionalism, i.e. the attribution of "particular forms and conditions of autonomy" also to ordinary-statute regions (with the consequent possibility for some regions to have further powers than others, but still less than the five special-statute regions).

Until 2018, the League expressed a strong opposition to the euro; in the 2018 Italian general election, Eurosceptic professors Alberto Bagnai and Claudio Borghi were elected to the Italian Parliament for the party. Following President Sergio Mattarella's rejection of the appointment of Paolo Savona, who had expressed himself on a "plan B" for Italy's exit from the Eurozone, as minister of the Economy in the Government of Change between the League and the M5S led by Giuseppe Conte as Prime Minister of Italy, the League reviewed its opposition to the single currency. The party's 2022 political manifesto, penned by Alessandro Amadori and Giuseppe Valditara in 2022, was promoted as liberal-conservative. More specifically, its authors designed a "country that should be liberal in its economy and society, wisely conservative on values, profoundly republican in its collective culture". In home affairs, the League strongly opposes illegal immigration, especially migratory flows from the sea. It is highly critical of non-governmental organisations (NGOs) transporting migrants to European cross-border countries, as they believe them to be complicit in "human trafficking". Within Italy's borders, the League is sceptical of asylum requests and related reception centers, calling for the deportation of irregular immigrants. During its time in government between 2018 and 2019, it tried to regulate some of the immigration issues through several security decrees.

In foreign policy, the party is Atlanticist, pro-United States, and pro-Israel. It has also supported friendlier ties with Russia; before the 2022 Russian invasion of Ukraine, it has long also opposed sanctions. In 2019, allegations that the party accepted Russian funding were discussed in Italy and dubbed "Russiagate". The charges of international corruption were ultimately dismissed on the grounds that the while "actions carried out were unequivocally aimed at the ultimate goal of illicitly financing the League, thanks to the relationships that Savoini, president of the Lombardy-Russia cultural association, had established with influential figures in the Russian political, economic, and cultural world", these actions could not be considered "suitable for achieving this goal, at least potentially, since not only the final phase of allocating a certain percentage" to the League but also that "the main transaction of buying and selling" the oil had not been completed. In September 2022, the Center for Strategic and International Studies wrote that the party was still "seen as Russia-friendly".

In economic policy, the League has a mixed record. Lega Nord started as economic liberal under the influx of Giancarlo Pagliarini, and eventually became more economically populist. The party's platform includes the reduction of the tax burden and the implementation of a flat income tax at 15%, while opposing limits to cash payments. As a result, the party has been described as distinctly neoliberal, while other observers contested any such characterisation, and the League would be torn between economic liberalism and Keynesian economics. Giorgetti is usually considered a liberal, while Bagnai identifies as post-Keynesian, as well as a left-wing populist, and factions are somewhat anti-globalist. On welfare, the League is one of the major critics of the increase in the retirement age envisaged by Elsa Fornero's 2011 pension reform and during Conte's first government got the approval of the "Quota 100" (retirement with 62 years of age and 38 of contributions). On the other hand, the party opposes the citizens' income and regrets having voted for it in 2018.

On social issues, the League generally holds conservative positions, with some exceptions. For instance, the party has been a long proponent of the decriminalization of sex work. Additionally, in January 2024 a majority of Veneto's regional councillors was supportive of a bill that would have regulated assisted suicide for terminally ill patients, under particular conditions, and in September 2026 a modified version of the bill was approved by a bipartisan vote, with the support of 16 LV councillors out of 19. On abortion, the party's MEPs voted against the resolution proposed by the European Citizens' Initiative (ECI), "My voice, my choice", a project that wanted to provide support, including financial support, to member states in providing access to abortion for anyone in Europe who does not have full access to abortion yet, however party members usually support abortion access according to the Italian current law.

== Alliances and international affiliation ==
The League is formally part of the centre-right coalition, along with Forza Italia (FI) and the Brothers of Italy (FdI). In the 2018–2019 and 2021–2022 period, the party governed both with the populist Five Star Movement (M5S) and the centre-left Democratic Party (PD), with the latter as part of a national unity government. In early 2022, two leading PD members (minister Dario Franceschini and Goffredo Bettini) respectively hinted that the League could re-affirm a centrist position, and could again form a coalition government with the PD after the next general election. The then PD secretary Enrico Letta ruled it out. In most regions, the League forms coalitions with FdI and FI, with some peculiarities. In Aosta Valley, it formed a short-lived left-right coalition in 2018. In South Tyrol, it has teamed up with the South Tyrolean People's Party (SVP) since 2018. In Trentino, it is also in alliance with the similarly regionalist Trentino Tyrolean Autonomist Party (PATT). In Sardinia, it has close ties with the Sardinian Action Party (PSd'Az), whose leader and former president of the region Christian Solinas was often counted among the League's governors, so that since 2018 there has been a League–Salvini Premier–Sardinian Action Party joint parliamentary group in the Senate. In Sicily, the League has formed a short-lived federation with the Movement for Autonomy (MpA). Countrywide, the party has federative pacts with the Union of the Centre (UdC), as well as the Italian Liberal Party (PLI).

At the European level, the party is affiliated to Patriots.eu, previously known as Identity and Democracy Party.

== Political communication ==
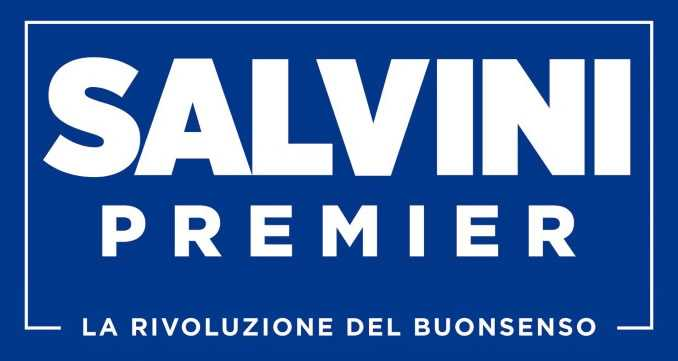
Placard adopted during the 2018 electoral campaign, resembling Donald Trump's one in 2016

Since 2014, the political communication and propaganda of Salvini and the League have been entrusted to an external communication company, named Sistema Intranet, owned by Luca Morisi and Andrea Paganella. This company has used a software known as "the Beast", which, through a series of algorithms (based on monitoring the sentiments of the network), according to many commentators, has contributed to Salvini's success on social networks. According to the various reconstructions it would be through this software that political messages, slogans, successful hashtags and scenes from Salvini's daily life would be selected. The communication strategy of the Beast was analysed in a study by the Department of Political Sciences of the University of Padua, according to which Salvini "opened the page in 2010 ... with a strategy that is still considered effective today ... able to be in tune with the prevailing moods of a substantial part of users on the network". Morisi's ability consists in "positioning himself on the right and majority side of public opinion" and being "able to analyse in real time the orientation of comments and reactions to a post and suggesting which topics to focus on in the next post". Morisi also invented the nickname "the Captain", with which Salvini is called by his supporters. In September 2021 Morisi resigned for "personal and family problems" and, right after, he was investigated following an accusation of cocaine transfer by two Romanian boys, a case that was dismissed in November. Paganella is no longer involved since he was elected senator in the 2022 general election.

== Regional and local government ==
The League participates in 14 out of 21 sub-national governments (Italy has 20 regions, one of which, Trentino-Alto Adige/Südtirol, is composed of two autonomous provinces with distinct autonomy and a seat each in the Conference of Regions and Autonomous Provinces: Trentino and South Tyrol). The following is a list of the most relevant local institutions led by party members.

Presidents of Regions

- Lombardy (9,965,046 inhabitants): Attilio Fontana
- Veneto (4,854,633 inhabitants): Alberto Stefani
- Friuli-Venezia Giulia (1,197,295 inhabitants): Massimiliano Fedriga

Presidents of Autonomous Provinces

- Trentino (542,58 inhabitants): Maurizio Fugatti

Presidents of Provinces

- Padua (Veneto, 931,572 inhabitants): Daniele Canella
- Verona (Veneto, 927,108 inhabitants): Flavio Massimo Pasini
- Treviso (Veneto, 876,755 inhabitants): Marco Donadel
- Monza and Brianza (Lombardy, 870,112 inhabitants): Luca Santambrogio
- Pavia (Lombardy, 534,691 inhabitants): Giovanni Palli
- Pescara (Abruzzo, 313,346 inhabitants): Ottavio De Martinis
- Macerata (Marche, 305,249 inhabitants): Sandro Parcaroli
- Rovigo (Veneto, 229,097 inhabitants): Enrico Ferrarese
- Belluno (Veneto, 197,645 inhabitants): Marco Staunovo Polacco
- Rieti (Lazio, 155,503 inhabitants): Roberta Cuneo

Mayors of Municipalities over 50,000 inhabitants

- Ferrara (Emilia-Romagna, 131,091 inhabitants): Alan Fabbri
- Novara (Piedmont, 101,727 inhabitants): Alessandro Canelli
- Treviso (Veneto, 84,793 inhabitants): Mario Conte
- Sesto San Giovanni (Lombardy, 79,732 inhabitants): Roberto Di Stefano
- Cinisello Balsamo (Lombardy, 74,534 inhabitants): Giacomo Ghilardi
- Massa (Tuscany, 66,423 inhabitants): Francesco Persiani
- Potenza (Basilicata, 64,786 inhabitants): Mario Guarente
- Foligno (Umbria, 55,520 inhabitants): Stefano Zuccarini
- Gallarate (Lombardy, 52,826 inhabitants): Andrea Cassani
- Montesilvano (Abruzzo, 53,174 inhabitants): Ottavio De Martinis
- Civitavecchia (Lazio, 51,824 inhabitants): Ernesto Tedesco

== Election results ==
=== Italian Parliament ===
Election	Leader	Chamber of Deputies					Senate of the Republic				
Election	Leader	Votes	%	Seats	+/–	Position	Votes	%	Seats	+/–	Position
2018	Matteo Salvini	5,698,687	17.4	124 / 630	▲104	▲3rd	5,321,537	17.6	58 / 315	▲40	▲3rd
2022	Matteo Salvini	2,464,005	8.8	66 / 400	▼59	▼4th	2,439,200	8.9	30 / 200	▼28	▼4th

=== European Parliament ===
Election	Leader	Votes	%	Seats	+/–	EP Group
2019	Matteo Salvini	9,175,208 (1st)	34.3	29 / 76	New	ID
2024	Matteo Salvini	2,099,269 (5th)	9.0	8 / 76	▼21	PfE

=== Regional Councils ===
Region	Election year	Votes	%	Seats	+/−	Status in legislature
Aosta Valley	2025	5,062 (5th)	8.4	3 / 35	▼8	Opposition
Piedmont	2024	155,522 (5th)	9.4	5 / 51	▼18	Majority
Lombardy	2023	476,175 (3rd); 177,387 (5th)	16.5 (party list); 6.2 (Fontana list)	20 / 80	▼10	Majority
South Tyrol	2023	8,541 (10th)	3.0	1 / 35	▼3	Majority
Trentino	2023	30,347 (2nd); 24,953 (4th)	13.1 (party list); 10.7 (Fugatti list)	10 / 35	▼4	Majority
Veneto	2025	607,220 (1st)	36.3	20 / 51	▼13	Majority
Friuli-Venezia Giulia	2023	75,117 (1st); 70,192 (3rd)	19.0 (party list); 17.8 (Fedriga list)	18 / 49	▲1	Majority
Emilia-Romagna	2024	78,736 (5th)	5.3	1 / 48	▼13	Opposition
Liguria	2024	47,652 (4th)	8.5	3 / 30	▼3	Majority
Tuscany	2025	55,684 (7th)	4.4	1 / 41	▼8	Opposition
Marche	2025	41,805 (4th)	7.4	3 / 31	▼5	Majority
Umbria	2024	24,729 (4th)	7.7	1 / 21	▼9	Opposition
Lazio	2023	131,631 (4th)	8.5	3 / 50	▼1	Majority
Abruzzo	2024	43,816 (5th)	7.6	2 / 31	▼8	Majority
Molise	2023	8,481 (8th)	6.0	1 / 21	▼1	Majority
Campania	2025	110,735 (8th)	5.5	3 / 51	Steady	Opposition
Apulia	2025	106,853 (4th)	8.0	4 / 49	Steady	Opposition
Basilicata	2024	20,430 (5th)	7.8	2 / 21	▼4	Majority
Calabria	2025	71,381 (5th)	9.4	4 / 29	▼1	Majority
Sicily	2022	127,454 (6th)	6.8	4 / 70	▲4	Majority
Sardinia	2024	25,957 (11th)	3.8	2 / 60	▼6	Opposition

== Leadership ==
=== Federal party ===
- Federal secretary: Matteo Salvini (2020–present) (Note: Salvini briefly resigned as federal secretary in the run-up of the 2026 federal extraordinary congress.)
- Deputy federal secretary: Giancarlo Giorgetti (2020–2024), Lorenzo Fontana (2020–2024), Andrea Crippa (2020–2025), Claudio Durigon (2024–2026), Alberto Stefani (2024–2026), Silvia Sardone (2025–2026), Roberto Vannacci (2025–2026), Alberto Di Rubba (2026) (Note: As deputy federal secretary, Di Rubba briefly served as federal secretary in the run-up of the 2026 federal extraordinary congress.)
- Federal coordinator of the regional secretariats: Andrea Crippa (2026–present)
- Organisational Secretary: Roberto Calderoli (2020–2022), Maurizio Bosatra (2022–present)
- Federal Administrator: Giulio Centemero (2020–2023), Alberto Di Rubba (2023–present)
- Party Leader in the Chamber of Deputies: Riccardo Molinari (2020–present)
- Party Leader in the Senate: Massimiliano Romeo (2020–2026), Marco Dreosto (2026–present)
- Party Leader in the European Parliament: Marco Campomenosi (2020–2024), Paolo Borchia (2024–present)

=== Major regional sections ===
Liga Veneta

- Secretary: Achille Tramarin (1980−1983), Marilena Marin (1983−1984), Franco Rocchetta (1984−1985), Marilena Marin (1985−1994), Fabrizio Comencini (1994−1998), Gian Paolo Gobbo (1998−2012), Flavio Tosi (2012−2015), Gianpaolo Dozzo (commissioner 2015–2016), Gianantonio Da Re (2016–2019), Lorenzo Fontana (commissioner 2019–2020), Alberto Stefani (2020–2026, commissioner 2020–2023), Andrea Tomaello (commissioner 2026–present)
- President: Franco Rocchetta (1991−1994), Gian Paolo Gobbo (1994−1998), Giuseppe Ceccato (1998–1999), Manuela Dal Lago (2001−2008), Flavio Tosi (2008−2012), Luca Baggio (2012–2015), Massimo Bitonci (2016–2020)

Lega Lombarda

- Secretary: Umberto Bossi (1984–1993), Luigi Negri (1993–1995), Roberto Calderoli (1995–2002), Giancarlo Giorgetti (2002–2012), Matteo Salvini (2012–2014), Stefano Borghesi (commissioner 2014–2015), Paolo Grimoldi (2015–2021), Fabrizio Cecchetti (commissioner 2021–2024), Massimiliano Romeo (2024–present)
- President: Augusto Arizzi (1986–1987), Silvana Bazzan (1987–1989), Franco Castellazzi (1989–1991), Francesco Speroni (1991–1993), Roberto Calderoli (1993–1995), Giuseppe Leoni (1995–1999), Stefano Galli (1999–2002), Roberto Castelli (2002–2012), Giancarlo Giorgetti (2012–2017), Giacomo Stucchi (2017–2020)

Lega Piemonte

- Secretary: Gipo Farassino (1987–1997), Domenico Comino (1997–1999), Bernardino Bosio (1999–2001), Roberto Cota (2001–2016), Riccardo Molinari (2016–present, commissioner 2020–2023)
- President: Angelo Colli (1991–1992), Domenico Comino (1994–1997), Bernardino Bosio (1997–1999), Silvano Straneo (2000–2001), Oreste Rossi (2001–2004), Mario Borghezio (2004–2011), Gianna Gancia (2012–2016), Stefano Allasia (2016–2020)

== Symbols ==
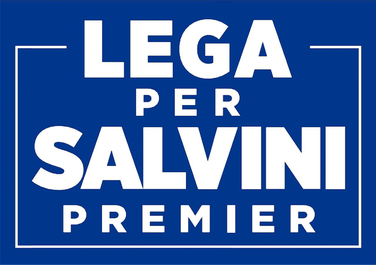
Official logo

Electoral logo 2017–2026

Electoral logo 2026–present

== See also ==
- List of political parties in Italy
