= Fabrizio Cecchetti =

Italian politician (born 1977)

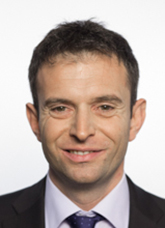
- Cecchetti in 2018

Member of the Chamber of Deputies
- Incumbent
- Assumed office 23 March 2018
- Constituency: Lombardy 1 – 04 (2018–2022); Lombardy 1 – 02 (2022–present)

Personal details
- Born: 3 December 1977 (age 48)
- Party: Lega

Fabrizio Cecchetti (born 3 December 1977) is an Italian politician serving as a member of the Chamber of Deputies since 2018. From 2012 to 2013, he served as president of the Regional Council of Lombardy.
