= Riccardo Molinari =

Italian politician (born 1983)

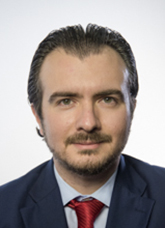
- Molinari in 2018

Member of the Chamber of Deputies
- Incumbent
- Assumed office 23 March 2018
- Constituency: Piedmont 2

Personal details
- Born: 29 July 1983 (age 43)
- Party: Lega

Riccardo Molinari (born 29 July 1983, Alessandria) is an Italian lawyer and politician of Lega serving as a member of the Chamber of Deputies. He was first elected in the 2018 general election, and was re-elected in 2022. Since 2018, he has served as group leader of Lega in the chamber.

== Biography ==
Born in Alessandria, where he has lived his entire life, Angelo—the son of a well-known doctor—earned his law degree from the University of Genoa in 2008. He is registered with the Genoa Bar Association as a foreign attorney, having passed the bar exam abroad (in Spain), and works as a self-employed attorney.
