= Andrea Crippa =

Italian politician (born 1986)

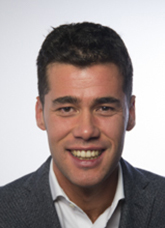
- Crippa in 2018

Member of the Chamber of Deputies
- Incumbent
- Assumed office 23 March 2018
- Constituency: Lombardy 1

Leader of Lega Giovani
- In office 7 July 2015 – 14 September 2019
- Preceded by: Matteo Mognaschi
- Succeeded by: Luca Toccalini

Personal details
- Born: 10 May 1986 (age 39)
- Party: Lega

Andrea Crippa (born 10 May 1986) is an Italian politician of Lega. Since 2018, he has been a member of the Chamber of Deputies. From 2015 to 2019, he was the leader of Lega Giovani. Since 2019, he has served as deputy federal secretary of Lega.
