= Giuseppe Ceccato =

Italian politician (born 1950)

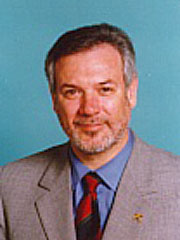
Image of Giuseppe Ceccato

Giuseppe Ceccato (Vicenza, 18 September 1950) is a Venetist politician.

He joined Liga Veneta in the 1980s, long before the foundation of Lega Nord in 1991. He was twice elected to the Italian Senate in 1994 and 1996. After the split of Liga Veneta Repubblica in 1998, he was elected national president of Liga Veneta. However he himself left the party in 1999 and launched Future Veneto. This party joined the Autonomists for Europe, a federation of splinter parties from Lega Nord, and run the 2000 regional election in a joint-list with Liga Fronte Veneto, then named Veneti d'Europa, which won a mere 2.4% regionally.

In early 2001, along with the other 13 Autonomist MPs, he joined European Democracy, but he failed re-election due to the bad result of the party, which won only 2.3% of the vote nationally. In 2002, European Democracy was merged with other Christian-democratic parties into the Union of Christian and Centre Democrats. Ceccato is currently a local leader of that party in the Province of Vicenza.

From 1995 to 2004, Ceccato served as Mayor of Montecchio Maggiore.
