= Paolo Grimoldi =

Italian politician (born 1975)

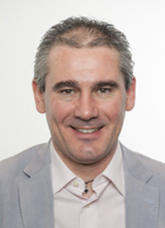
- Grimoldi in 2018

Member of the Chamber of Deputies
- In office 28 April 2006 – 12 October 2022
- Constituency: Lombardy 1 (2006–2018); Lombardy 1 – 01 (2018–2022)

Personal details
- Born: 27 September 1975 (age 50)
- Party: Patto per il Nord (since 2024)
- Other political affiliations: Lega Nord (1991–2021); Lega (2017–2024)

Paolo Grimoldi (born 27 September 1975) is an Italian politician. From 2006 to 2022, he was a member of the Chamber of Deputies. From 2015 to 2021, he served as secretary of Lega Lombarda. From 2002 to 2011, he served as federal coordinator of Lega Giovani.
