= Elisa Montemagni =

Italian politician (born 1986)

Member of the Chamber of Deputies
- Incumbent
- Assumed office 13 October 2022
- Constituency: Tuscany – 02

Member of the Regional Council of Tuscany
- In office 17 June 2015 – 18 October 2022

Personal details
- Born: 1 June 1986 (age 39)
- Party: Lega

Elisa Montemagni (born 1 June 1986) is an Italian politician serving as a member of the Chamber of Deputies since 2022. From 2015 to 2022, she was a member of the Regional Council of Tuscany.
