= Stefano Borghesi =

Italian politician (born 1977)

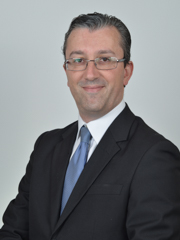
- Borghesi in 2018

Member of the Senate
- Incumbent
- Assumed office 23 March 2018
- Constituency: Lombardy – 15 (2018–2022); Lombardy – 08 (2022–present)

Member of the Chamber of Deputies
- In office 15 March 2013 – 22 March 2018
- Constituency: Lombardy 2

Personal details
- Born: 16 September 1977 (age 48)
- Party: Lega

Stefano Borghesi (born 16 September 1977) is an Italian politician serving as a member of the Senate since 2018. From 2013 to 2018, he was a member of the Chamber of Deputies.
