= Luca Toccalini =

Italian politician (born 1990)

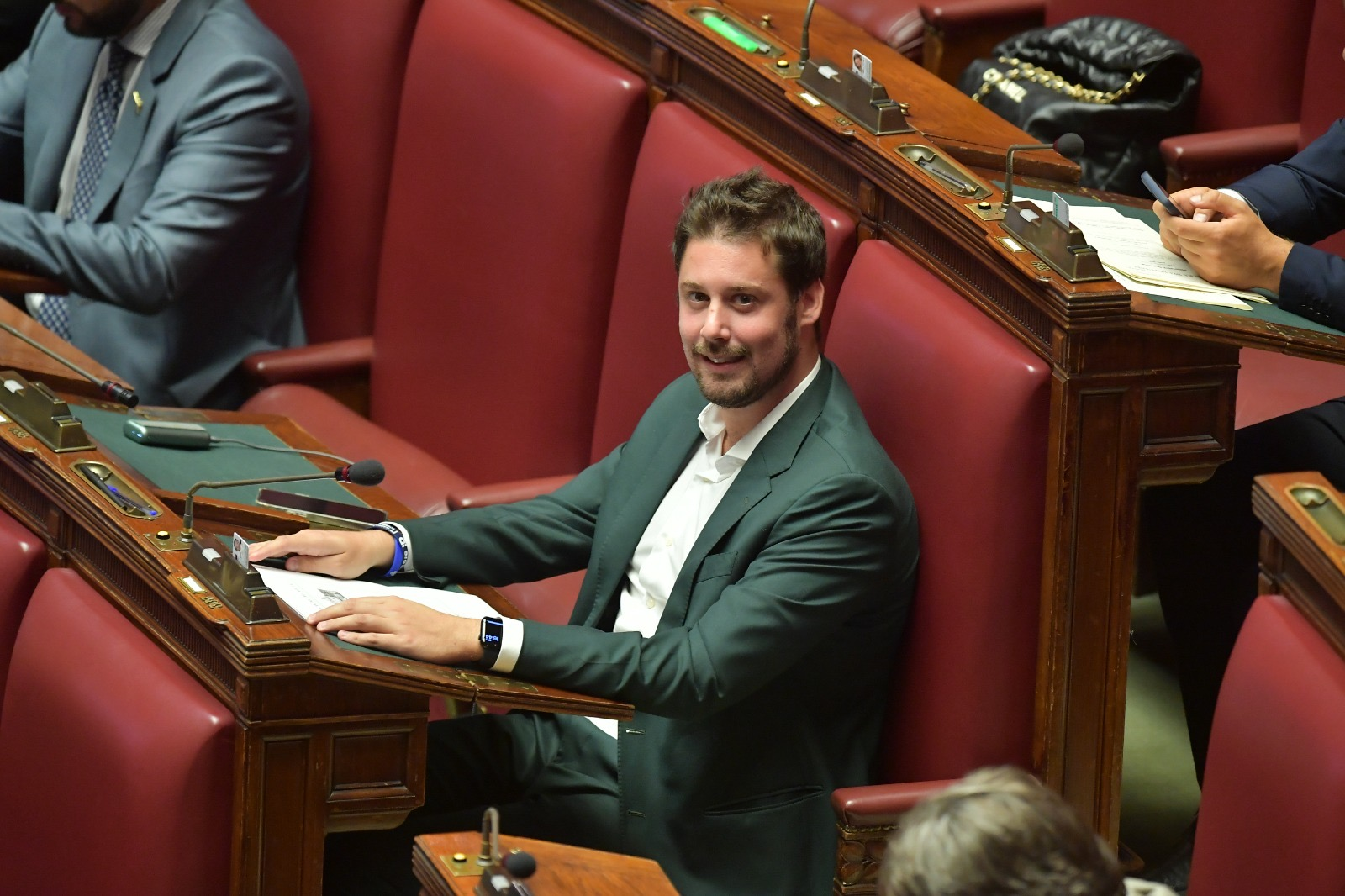
- Toccalini in 2023

Leader of Lega Giovani
- Incumbent
- Assumed office 14 September 2019
- Preceded by: Andrea Crippa

Member of the Chamber of Deputies
- Incumbent
- Assumed office 26 July 2018
- Preceded by: Claudia Terzi
- Constituency: Lombardy 1 (2018–2022); Lombardy 4 (2022–present)

Personal details
- Born: 18 May 1990 (age 35)
- Party: Lega

Luca Toccalini (born 18 May 1990) is an Italian politician serving as a member of the Chamber of Deputies since 2018. In 2019, he was elected leader of Lega Giovani. From 2015 to 2019, he was the leader of Lega Giovani in Lombardy.
