= Gian Marco Centinaio =

Italian politician (born 1971)

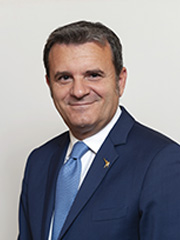

Vice President of the Senate of the Republic
- Incumbent
- Assumed office 19 October 2022

Minister of Agriculture
- In office 1 June 2018 – 5 September 2019
- Prime Minister: Giuseppe Conte
- Preceded by: Maurizio Martina
- Succeeded by: Teresa Bellanova

Member of the Senate of the Republic
- Incumbent
- Assumed office 15 March 2013

Personal details
- Born: 31 October 1971 (age 54) Pavia, Italy
- Party: Lega
- Other political affiliations: Lega Nord
- Education: University of Pavia
- Occupation: Manager, politician

Gian Marco Centinaio (born 31 October 1971) is an Italian politician for Lega, serving as Vice President of the Senate of the Republic. He served as Minister of Agriculture and Tourism in the Conte Cabinet from 1 June 2018 to September 2019.

== Biography ==
Centinaio was born in Pavia, in the Italian region of Lombardy, on 31 October 1971. Centinaio received a Political Science degree from the University of Pavia in 1999.

== Political career ==
In 2005, Centinaio was elected Municipal Councilor in his hometown, then, from 2009 to 2013, he was Deputy Mayor and Councillor for Tourism and Culture of the Municipality of Pavia.

=== Senate of the Republic ===
A candidate in Lombardy with Lega Nord, Centinaio was elected to the Senate of the Republic in February 2013 for the Legislature XVII of Italy. In July 2014 Centinaio was elected the floor leader of his party, replacing Massimo Bitonci. On 27 September 2017, he was embroiled in a fake news dispute, sharing on his Facebook accusations that Laura Boldrini, then President of the Chamber, was involved in a nepotistic scandal.

Centinaio was reelected to the Senate as part of the Legislature XVIII of Italy in March 2018, retaining his position as floor leader. During this period Centinaio would oppose the ratification of the Comprehensive Economic and Trade Agreement (CETA) between the EU and Canada.

=== Minister of Agriculture ===
Centinaio was appointed as Minister of Agriculture in June 2018 as part of the Conte I Cabinet. He left this office with the introduction of the Conte II Cabinet in 2019.

== Personal life ==
Centinaio is married and has a son. He is a fan of Parma Calcio 1913 and enjoys motorcycling.
