= More Tuscany =

Regionalist political party

More Tuscany (Più Toscana, PT) is a regionalist political party in Italy active in Tuscany, Italy.

The party was formed in October 2012 by a group of splinters from Lega Nord Toscana (LNT) led by Antonio Gambetta Vianna, a former president of the party, and Gian Luca Lazzeri, who were supporters of Claudio Morganti, former leader of LNT and MEP. PT, which is defined by its members as a research institute, promotes the knowledge, appreciation and advancement of the "Tuscan people", its culture, heritage and traditions.

Morganti's leadership was openly contested by some party members and, between April and December 2011, two of the four LNT regional councillors left in protest, even though Morganti had resigned from party secretary in September. In October 2012 the two remaining regional councillors of the party, Vianna and Lazzeri, responded to the emphasis posed by Lega Nord's federal secretary Roberto Maroni on the North and the establishment of a Padanian euroregion by changing the denomination of their group from "Lega Nord Toscana" to "More Tuscany". Vianna and Lazzeri were soon expelled from the party, which was left without regional councillors. In April 2013 also Morganti was expelled from the party. PT members expressed their support for him.

In November 2013 PT joined the New Centre-Right, albeit keeping its own group in the Regional Council.

In the 2015 regional election a joint list of Lega Toscana and More Tuscany won 0.6% of the vote.
