= Roberto Castelli =

Italian politician (born 1946)

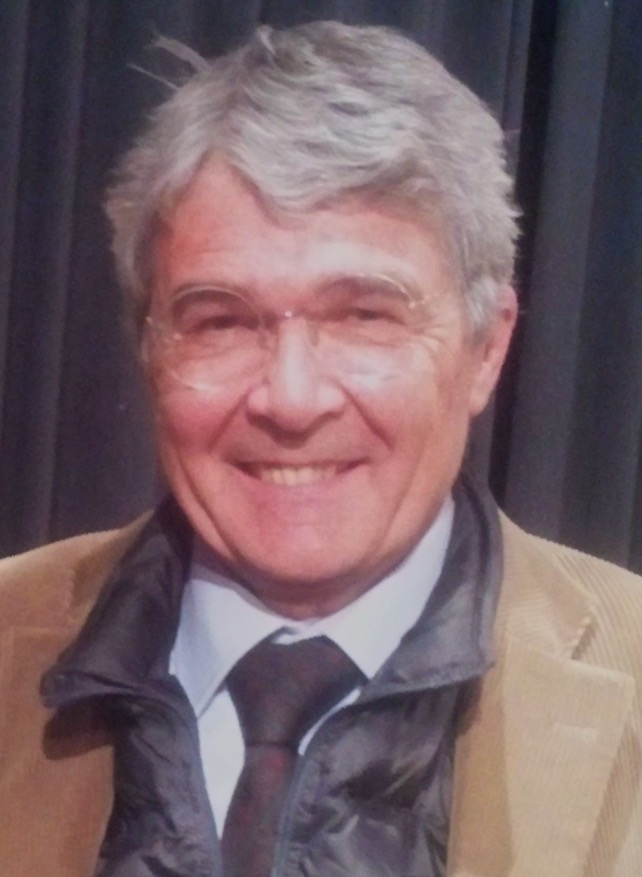

Minister of Justice
- In office 11 June 2001 – 17 May 2006
- Prime Minister: Silvio Berlusconi
- Preceded by: Piero Fassino
- Succeeded by: Clemente Mastella

Member of the Senate of the Republic
- In office 9 May 1996 – 14 March 2013
- Constituency: Lombardy (1996–2008); Liguria (2008–2013)

Member of the Chamber of Deputies
- In office 23 April 1992 – 8 May 1996
- Constituency: Como (1992–1994); Lecco (1994–1996)

Personal details
- Born: 12 July 1946 (age 80) Lecco, Italy
- Party: Lega Nord (until 2023); Northern People's Party (since 2023)
- Education: Politecnico di Milano
- Profession: Engineer

Roberto Castelli (born 12 July 1946) is an Italian politician. He was the Minister of Justice in the second and third governments of Silvio Berlusconi. He has been one of the main representatives of Lega Nord.

== Early life and education ==
Castelli was born in Lecco on 12 July 1946. He holds a degree in mechanic engineering.

== Career ==
Castelli is an engineer, and has been in politics with the Northern League since 1986. In 1992, Castelli was elected to the Chamber of Deputies and was re-elected in 1994. From 1996 to 2013, he was a member of the Senate of the Republic, and for two years (1999–2001) was chairman of parliamentary group of the Northern League in the Senate.

== Minister of Justice ==
In fall 2004, Castelli completed a highly controversial reform of the judiciary (Castelli Reform). Initially, the then Italian president Carlo Azeglio Ciampi, even though he had been pressured by Castelli to do so, refused to sign the bill. The law was passed again in spring 2005.

As a minister, Castelli refused to sign Ciampi's decision to pardon Adriano Sofri, leading to a conflict of powers in which Ciampi, as the president of the Italian Republic, tried to reassert its exclusive competence in the matter (as stated in article 87 of the Constitution of Italy), and Castelli claimed that, as justice minister, he had the right to object. He also refused to request the extradition of 22 alleged CIA agents from the United States who were implicated in the kidnapping and torture of Hassan Mustafa Osama Nasr. On 13 December 2012, Castelli said during the satirical talk show of Rai Radio 2 Un giorno da pecora that he would not seek re-election to the 2013 Italian general election.

== Electoral history ==
Election	House	Constituency	Party	Votes	Result
1992	Chamber of Deputies	Como–Sondrio–Varese	LL	14,537	Elected
1994	Chamber of Deputies	Lecco	LN	49,380	Elected
1996	Senate of the Republic	Lombardy – Lecco	LN	58,651	Elected
2001	Senate of the Republic	Lombardy – Lecco	LN	75,312	Elected
2006	Senate of the Republic	Lombardy	LN	– (Note: Elected in a closed list proportional representation system.)	Elected
2008	Senate of the Republic	Lombardy	LN	–	Elected

Political offices
Preceded by Piero Fassino	Italian Minister of Justice; 2001–2006	Succeeded by Clemente Mastella
