= Cazzago Brabbia =

- Comune
- Comune di Cazzago Brabbia
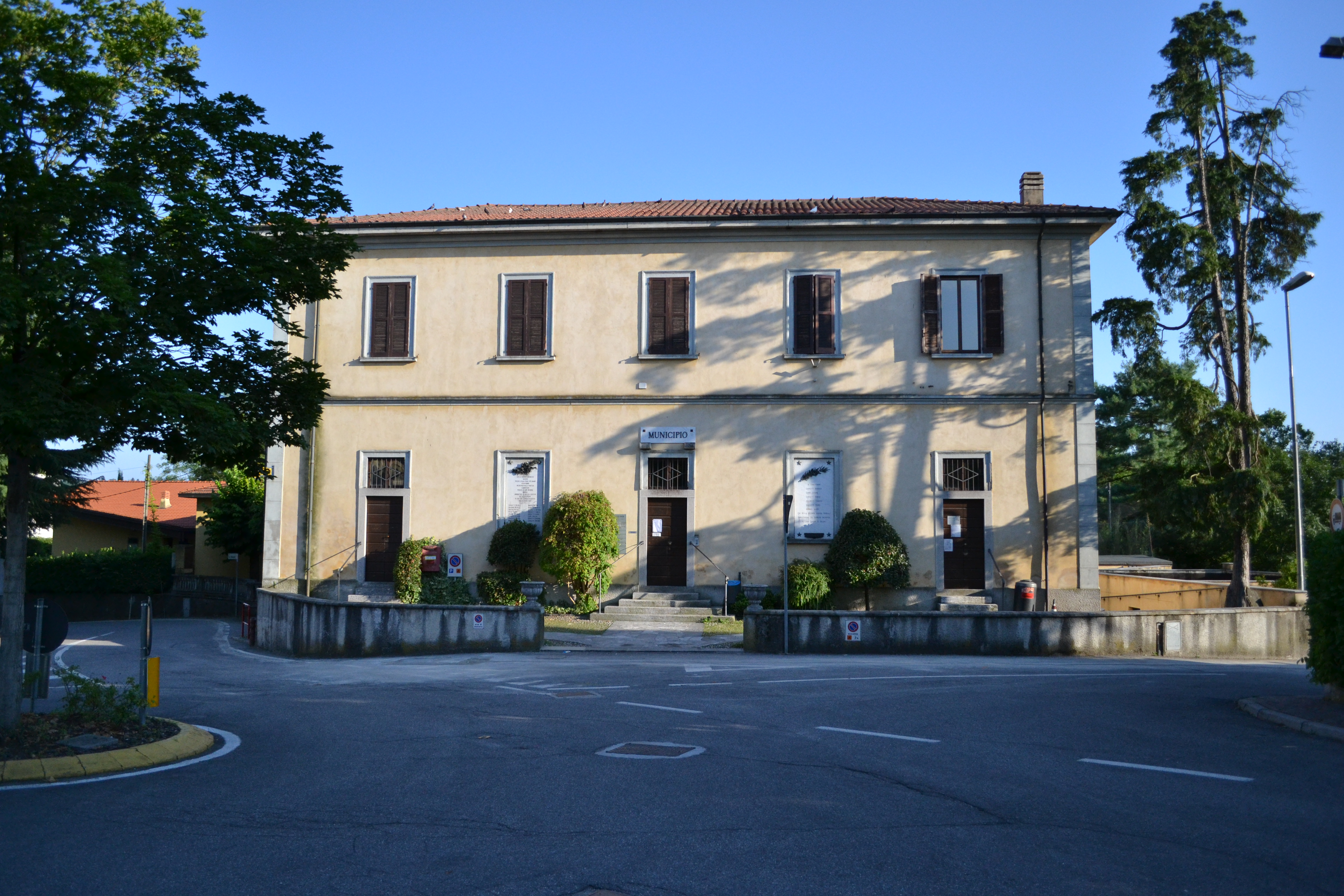

- Coat of arms

- Location within Italy Location within Lombardy
- Coordinates: 45°48′N 8°44′E
- Country: Italy
- Region: Lombardy
- Province: Varese (VA)
- Frazioni: Torbiera di Cazzago, Cascina Costa, Bonze, Pizzo di Cazzago, Fornaci, Fosso di Mezzo

Government
  - Mayor: Davide Bossi

Area
  - Total: 3 km^{2} (1.2 sq mi)
- Elevation: 265 m (869 ft)

Population (2011)
  - Total: 827
  - Density: 280/km^{2} (710/sq mi)
- Demonym: Cazzaghesi
- Time zone: UTC+1 (CET)
  - Summer (DST): UTC+2 (CEST)
- Postal code: 21020
- Dialing code: 0332

Cazzago Brabbia is a comune in the province of Varese, in Lombardy.

== Population ==
As of census 2011, it has a population of 772.
