= Massimiliano Romeo =

Italian politician

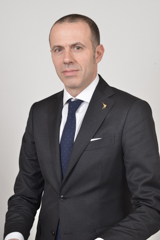
Massimiliano Romeo in 2018.

Massimiliano Romeo (born 22 January 1971) is an Italian politician. He is the group leader of Lega Nord in the Italian Senate.
