= Claudio Borghi (politician) =

Italian politician and businessman (born 1970)

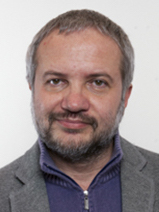

Member of the Senate
- Incumbent
- Assumed office 13 October 2022
- Constituency: Tuscany

Member of the Regional Council of Tuscany
- In office 17 June 2015 – 11 April 2018

Member of the Chamber of Deputies
- In office 23 March 2018 – 13 October 2022
- Constituency: Tuscany

Personal details
- Born: 6 June 1970 (age 56) Milan, Lombardy, Italy
- Party: Lega (since 2020); Lega Nord (2013–2020)
- Education: Università Cattolica del Sacro Cuore
- Profession: Politician, professor
- Website: claudioborghiaquilini.it

Claudio Borghi (born 6 June 1970, in Milan, Italy) is an Italian businessman, former lecturer and politician, one of the top economic spokesmen of Italy's League party.

== Biography ==
Borghi has worked since he was young in the field of financial markets, starting his career at 19 at a stockbroker's office in Milan. Subsequently, he moved to Deutsche Bank, to Merrill Lynch and then again to Deutsche Bank, where he reaches the highest level of management, being appointed managing director in 2006. As a working student, he graduated in Economics and Banking with 110 cum laude, attending the Catholic University of the Sacred Heart in Milan in the evening and winning the Agostino Gemelli Award as the best graduate of his degree course.

In September 1999, he married Giorgia Fantin Borghi, who became later one of the most famous wedding planner in Italy.

In 2009, he retired from work in the financial markets and became a contract professor of Economics of financial intermediaries, Economics of credit companies and the Economics of Art at the Catholic University. He has also taught in master's courses at the LUISS in Rome and at the IED in Venice.

He became a journalist in 2010 and for years has been an economic columnist for Il Giornale. In 2014, he wrote on behalf of Matteo Salvini and Northern League a manual entitled Basta Euro (No More Euro). In the same year, he was candidate for the European Parliament with the Northern League, but he was not elected. In October 2014, he was appointed economic manager of the party and therefore abandoned the teaching activity to devote himself full time to politics.

In 2015, he was candidate for President of the Tuscany Region in the 2015 Tuscan regional election, with the support of Northern League and Brothers of Italy. He obtained 20% of the preference votes, but was defeated by the outgoing president Enrico Rossi.

In 2018, he was elected to the Chamber of Deputies and has been part of the expert panel charged with drawing up the government contract between the Five Star Movement and the League.

On 21 June 2018, he was elected President of the V Commission (Budget, Treasury and Planning) of the Chamber.

== Works ==
- Investire nell'arte, Claudio Borghi Aquilini, Sperling & Kupfer (2013)
