= Lombard nationalism =

Nationalist movement in Lombardy, Italy

One of the historical flag of Lombardy (used by the Lombard League and the Duchy of Milan)

Lombard nationalism is a nationalist, but primarily regionalist, movement active primarily in Lombardy, Italy. It seeks more autonomy or even independence from Italy for Lombardy and, possibly, all the lands that are linguistically or historically Lombard. During the 1990s, it was strictly connected with Padanian nationalism.

Today the main Lombard nationalist parties are the Lombard League and Pro Lombardy Independence.

== History ==
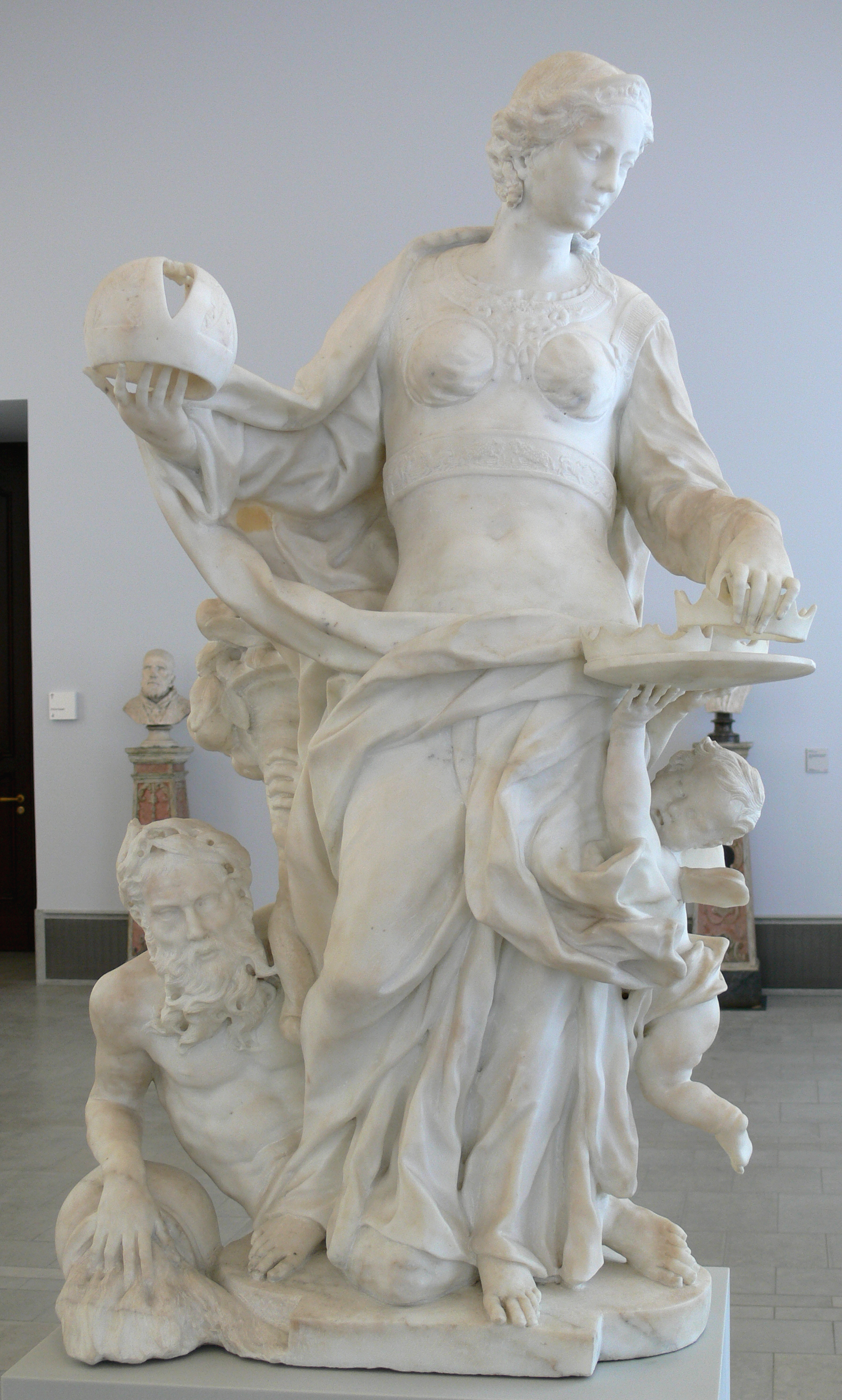
Giovanni Baratta: Allegory of Lombardy (Bode-Museum, Berlin)

Like in the rest of Europe, during the Romantic Era there was an awakening of the national sentiment in Lombardy. The Napoleonic creation of the Cispadane Republic, which was later replaced by the Cisalpine one, opened the doors to the political debate. Carlo Botta, a Piedmontese politician, wrote a book entitled Proposition to the Lombards about a way of free government, where he claimed the need of a constitution for the Lombard Nation, independent from the French one inspired by the Revolution. At the same time, Giuseppe Faroni proposed a draft constitution entitled Constitutional pole for the Lombard Republic.

The first independence movements appeared in the first half of the 19th century. Carlo Porta, one of the most important Lombard intellectuals, presented his adhesion to this idea in some writings. They were often associated with Italian federalist movements, but they considered Lombardy as a nation instead a mere administrative division of the future state:

Che vegga Italia e la nazion lombarda
strette ad un patto

Translation:

That I'll see Italy and the Lombard nation
close to a deal

— Pater Noster (dei Milanesi), a patriotic song of 1848

During the Five Days of Milan in 1848, at first, insurgents only wanted greater autonomy for Lombardy in the Austrian Empire, with the possibility to administrate itself. A large part of the leaders of the insurrection, such as Carlo Cattaneo, was opposed to the Piedmont intervention.

After the annexation to the Kingdom of Sardinia (and the creation of the Italian state), it seemed that some republican and federalist movements wanted the creation of a State of Milan, because of the cultural, economical and social differences between Lombardy and the rest of Italy.

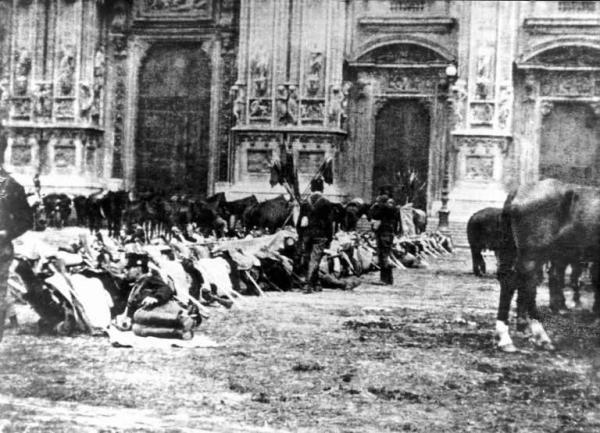
Italian troops occupying Piazza Duomo in Milan, 1898

During the riots of Milan in 1898 and the other strikes in the following years (especially in 1913, when the Kingdom had to move 30 000 soldiers), some rumours of separatism came to the Italian government.

In the 1950s, some small movements for autonomy appeared such as the Movimento Autonomista Bergamasco, founded in 1947 by Guido Calderoli, which participated in the local elections in 1956, and later involved other Lombard provinces, turning first into Movimento Autonomista Regionale Lombardo (asking for creation of the Lombard Region, as required by the Italian constitution) and then into Movimento Autonomie Regionali Padane (participating at political elections in 1958 and 1967), before dissolution in 1970. Another movement is the Unione autonomisti padani, created by Ugo Gavazzeni with the union of various autonomist movements in northern Italy, that participated at political elections in 1967.

From the legacy of this experiences in the 1980s, the Lombard League was founded (since 1989 part of the Northern League). During the years, its political goal shifted between the separatism and the ask for a greater autonomy in the Italian state. In 2018, the independentist tendency was officially abandoned by the federal secretary Matteo Salvini, after five years of ambiguity.

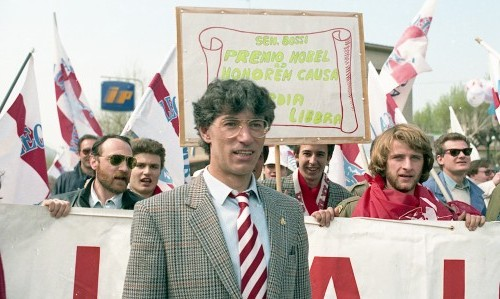
Umberto Bossi, founder of the Lombard League, in 1990

In the first decades of the 21st century, some cultural initiative and political parties appeared (among which Pro Lombardia Indipendenza is the best structured one).

In 2017, an advisory referendum (done simultaneously with the Venetian one) about the concession of a greater autonomy to the Lombard Region took place. 38.3% of Lombards turned out for the referendum and 95.3% of them voted for greater autonomy. So the president of Lombardy, Roberto Maroni, opened the negotiations with Rome.

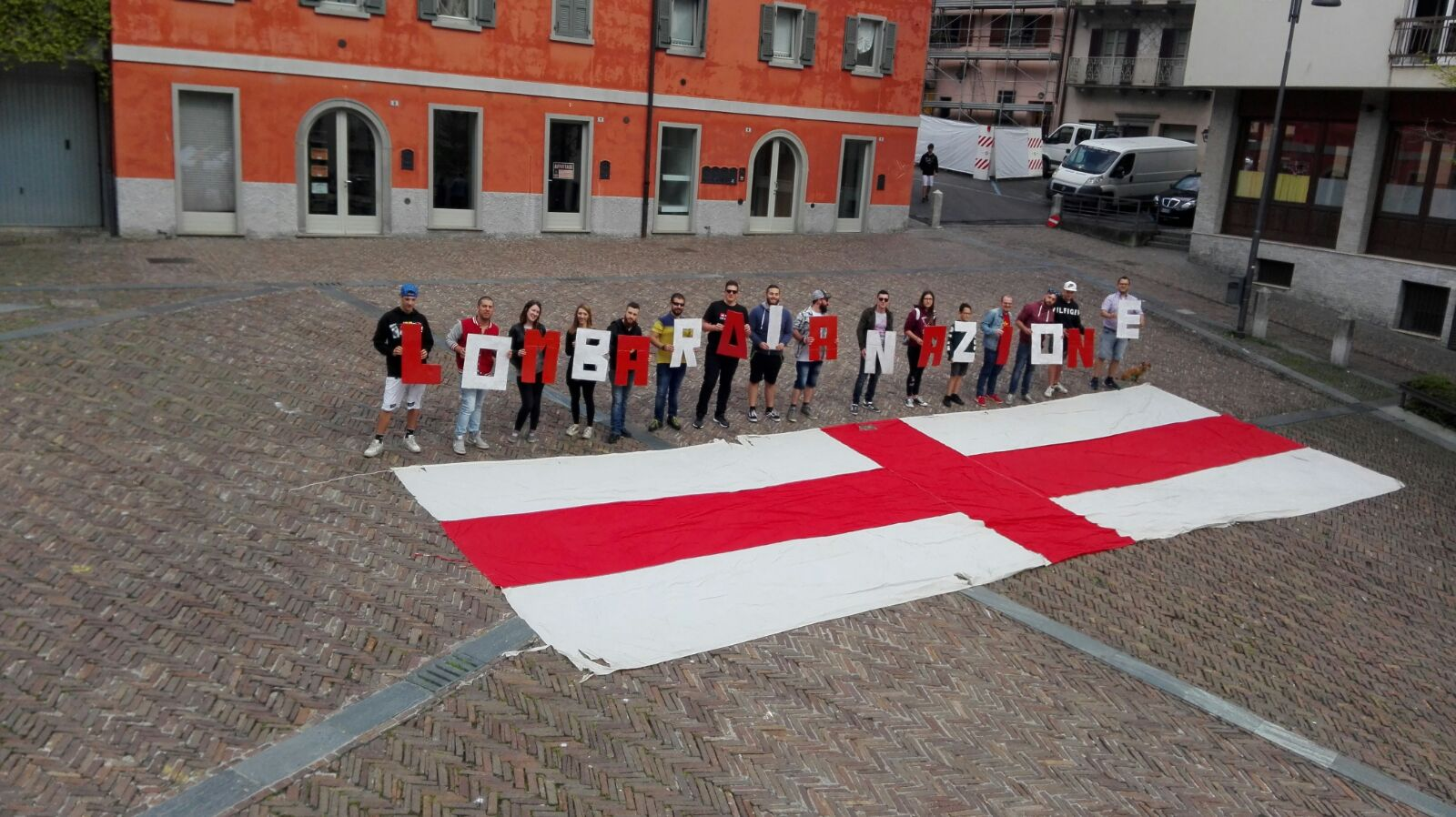
Lombard independentist rally in Clusone

After the latest elections for the central and regional government in 2018, the new Lombard president Attilio Fontana designated Stefano Bruno Galli as the autonomy assessor, waiting for the formation of the new Italian government.

== Definition of Lombardy ==
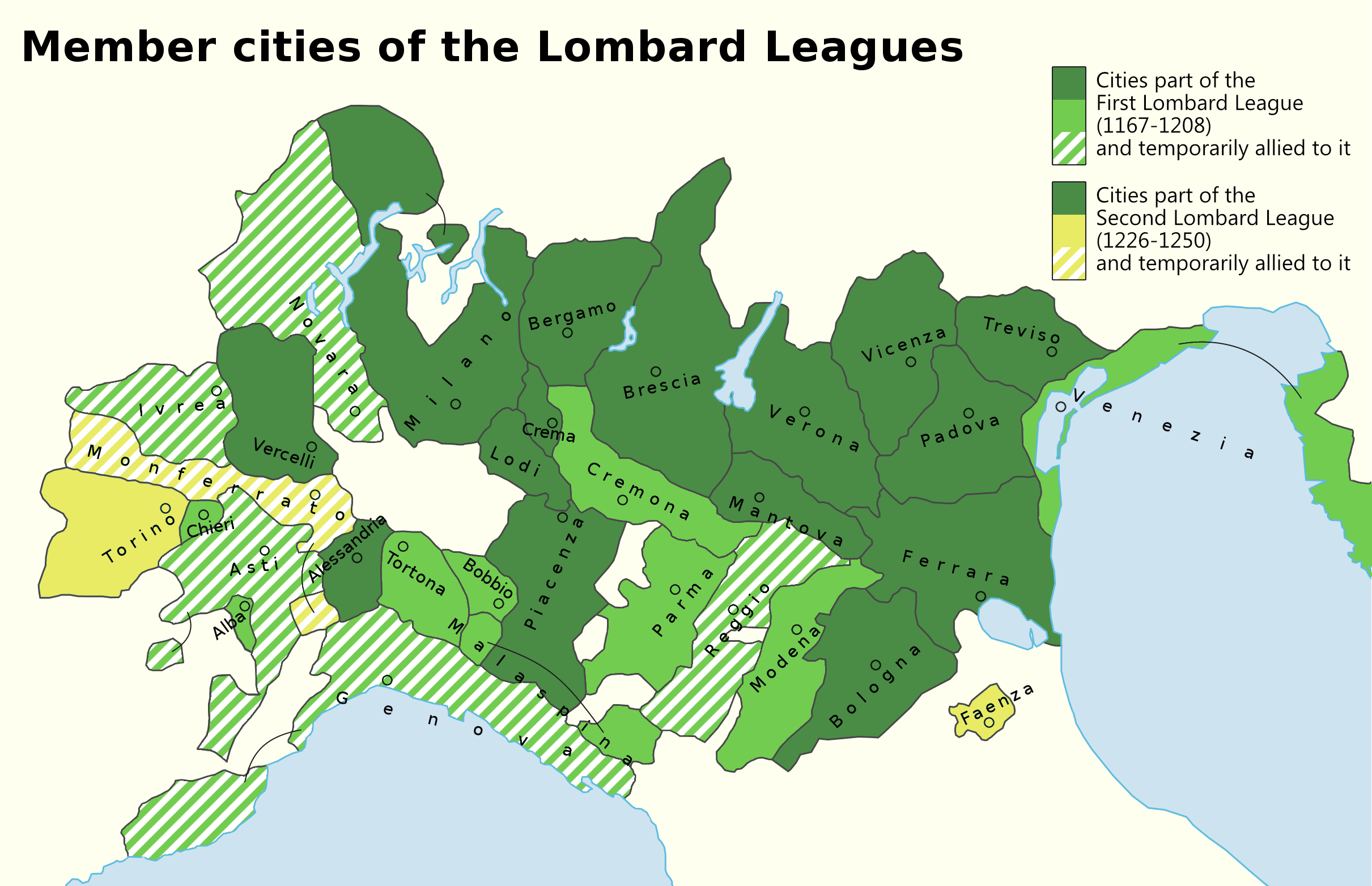
Member cities of the Lombard League

Visconti dominions (green) and today Lombard-speaking area (yellow)

During the ages, the concept of Lombardy changed quite frequently. In Early Middle Ages, the word Longobardia indicated all the Lombard Kingdom. Since the 12th century, the archaic term was gradually replaced by Lombardia (as a linguistic evolution, first appeared in the Pauli Continuatio) and in the geographic view it indicated first the area of the Langobardia Maior and then only the Po Valley, where the centre of the Lombard power was located. Meanwhile, Lombardia took on a political meaning, with the creation of the Lombard League and the fight against the emperors for the municipal liberties. The definition remained such until the 19th century, when the new Italian state created the current administrative region in the territory of the so-called Austrian Lombardy, with the addition of Lomellina and Oltrepò Pavese.

Linguistically, the Lombard-speaking area is bigger than the administrative region, and also includes the provinces of Novara, Verbano-Cusio-Ossola plus a part of the Alessandria one in Piedmont, Canton Ticino and the southern valleys of Grigioni in Switzerland, and the western valleys of Trentino. It partially corresponds to the territory of the first Visconti domain in the 13th century.

Some independence parties use alternative expressions, such as Historical Lombardy, in opposition to the today's administrative region. According to Pro Lombardy Independence and Eurominority, it corresponds with the joined Lombard-speaking and Emilian-speaking areas.

Map of Lombardy according to pro-Lombardia Indipendenza

== Symbolism ==
The Lombard movements today don't have a unique symbol recognized by all.

The statue of Legnano Warrior, erroneously identified as Alberto da Giussano, was first used in the end of 1950s by the journal La Regione Lombarda, official organ of the Movimento Autonomista Regionale Lombardo. Later it was adopted by the Lombard League and finally became the symbol of the Northern League; today is recognized only as a symbol of that political party.

The Saint Ambrose's Cross (often referred to as the most famous St. George Cross) is used by most independence and autonomy parties, some of them also use the flag of the Duchy of Milan (called Ducale), the Camunian rose (official flag of the Lombard region) or a flag inspired by federalist movements of 1848, with St. Ambrose's Cross superimposed by green. There is also the idea of using a flag with both the red cross and the Biscione of the House of Visconti.

St. Ambrose Cross (as used by the City of Milan)

Flag of the Golden Ambrosian Republic

The Ducale (flag of the Duchy of Milan and modern symbol of Insubrian ethnicity)

Camunian rose (flag of the Lombard Region)
