= Flag of Lombardy =

Italian regional flag

- Proportion: 2:3
- Adopted: 4 February 2019 (de jure); 12 June 1975 (de facto)
- Design: A green field with the Rosa Camuna (also called curvilinear cross) in white, rotated 22.5° in the centre

The flag of Lombardy is one of the official symbols of the region of Lombardy, Italy. The current flag was officially adopted on 4 February 2019, although it has been used de facto since 12 June 1975.

== Symbolism ==
The flag is a field of green, representing the Po Valley, with the Rosa Camuna (a symbol of the region derived from a prehistoric drawing made by the ancient Camuni) in white in the centre, representing the light.

== History ==
The modern version of the Rosa Camuna was designed by Bruno Munari, Bob Noorda, Roberto Sambonet and Pino Tovaglia in 1975, and became the regional emblem on 12 June 1975. After that, a 2:3 version of the Rosa Camuna was used like a provisional flag.

Since 1990, the Lega Nord party tried to establish the Saint Ambrose's flag (a red cross on a white field), used by the city of Milan and the Lombard League during the Middle Ages, without succeeding.

In 2007 a study commissioned by the Region concluded that the most representative flag was that of the Duchy of Milan (the so-called Ducale, composed by quartering the Biscione and the Reichsadler), but the proposal was never discussed.

The idea of combining the Rosa Camuna with Saint Ambrose's Cross first appeared in 2011: six sketches were published and polled on the daily newspaper Corriere della Sera, without sequel. A new proposal was discussed in 2015, but it was also rejected.

The provisional flag was finally adopted with a unanimous vote of the Regional Council on 29 January 2019, becoming official on 4 February 2019.

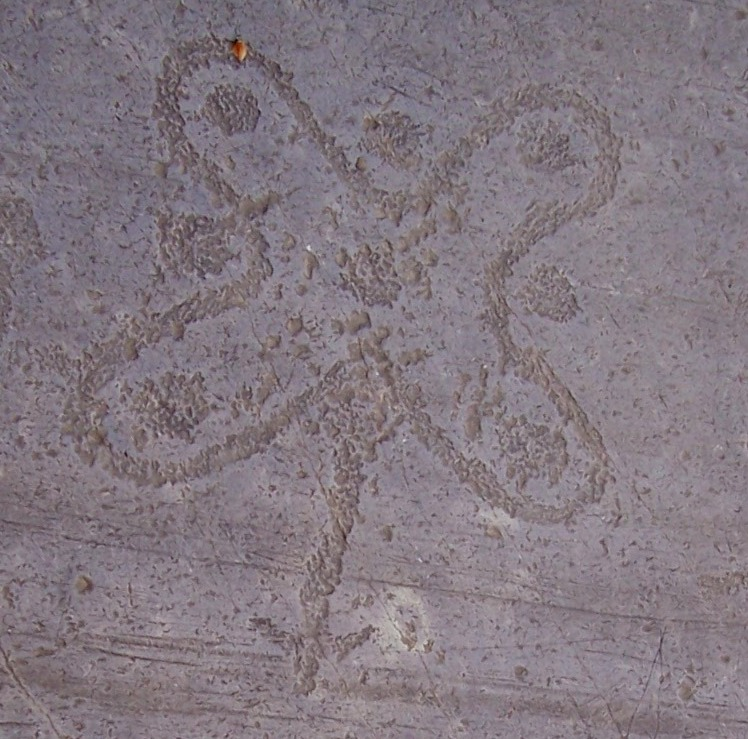
One of the several prehistoric engravings in Valcamonica.

Geometric construction of the modern version in 1975

The flag in 1:1 proportions

Saint Ambrose's flag, proposed several times

Flag of the Duchy of Milan, proposed in 2007

The 2015 proposal

=== Kingdom of the Lombards ===
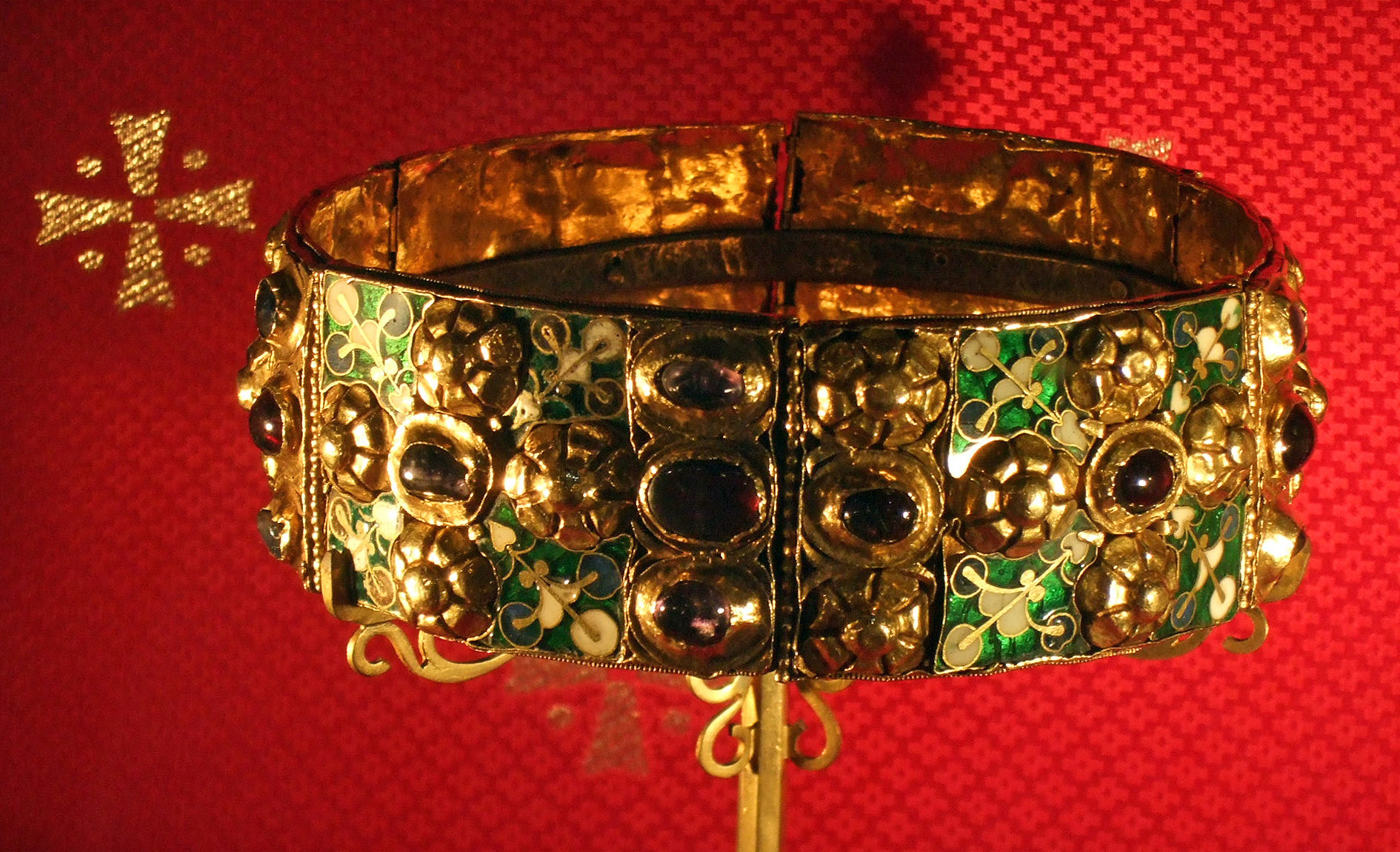
The Iron Crown of Lombardy

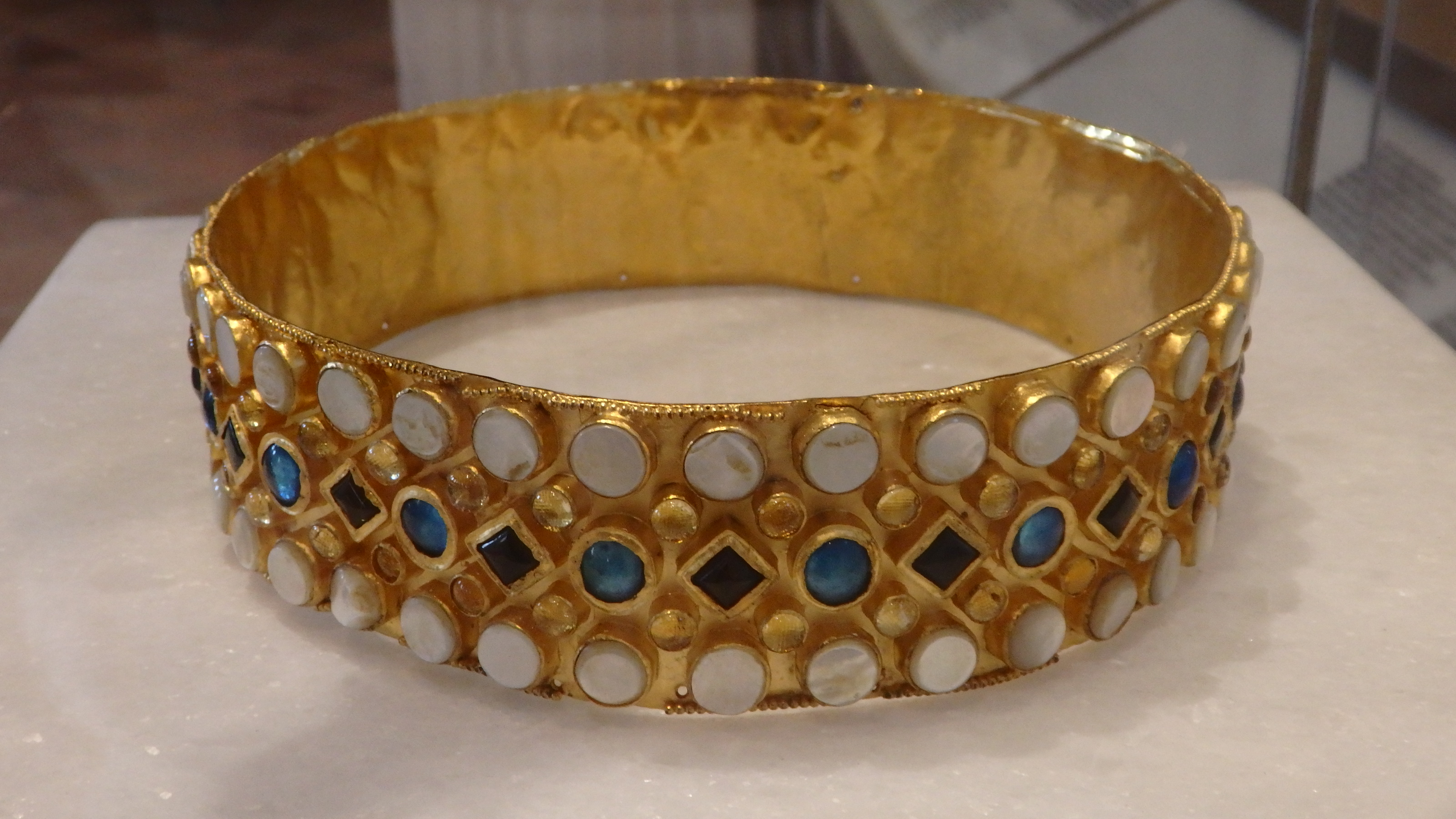
The Theodelinda Crown

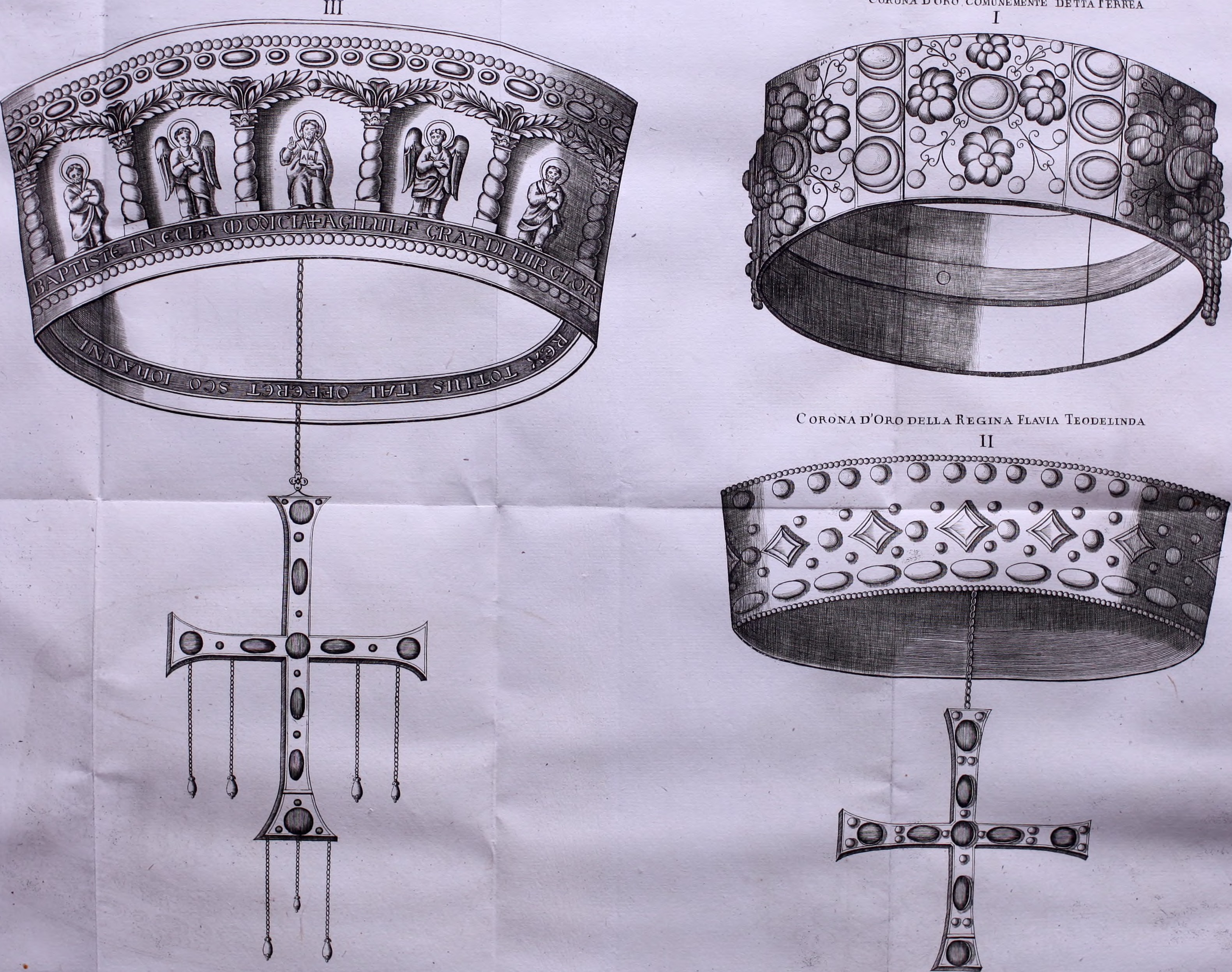
Depiction of the Crown of Agilulf (left)

Since modern heraldry did not develop until the High Middle Ages, there was no banner nor coat of arms for the Kingdom. A later tradition retrospectively saw the three votive crowns of the cathedral of Monza (the so-called Iron Crown, the crown of Theodelinda and the one of Agilulf) as symbols of the Lombard kingdom. But in fact, the Lombard coinage tend to show that Lombards used crosses and calvaries as their only symbols.

=== The Lombard League ===
First documented flag of Milan

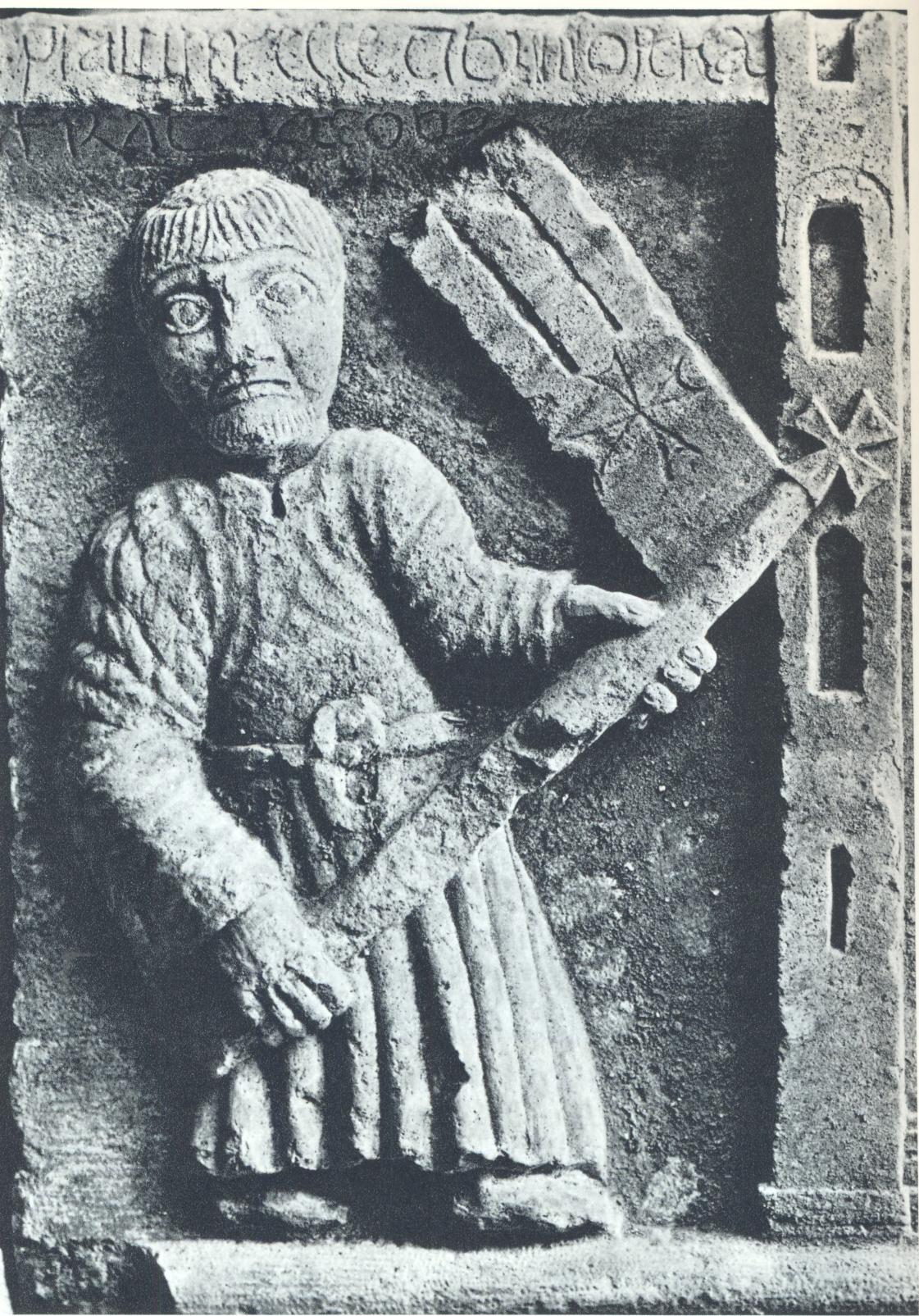
Milan's standard bearer, detail from the bas-reliefs of Porta Romana

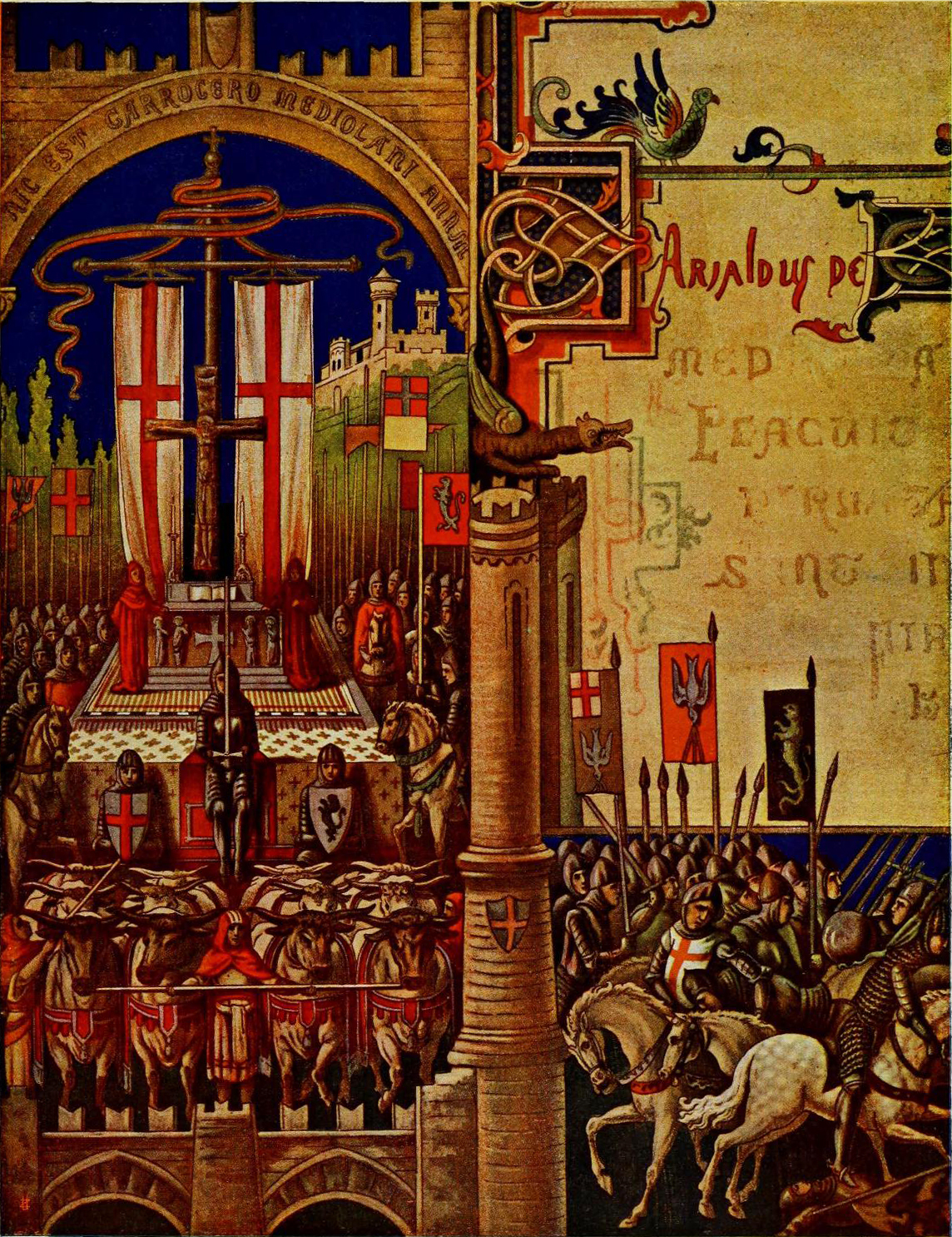
The carroccio as depicted in an ancient miniature

When the Lombard League (1167) was created to defend the municipal liberties against Barbarossa, the communes raised a flag with a red cross on a white field, that was at the same time the flag of Milan (destroyed by the emperor in 1162), and the opposite of the loyalist cities flag (a white cross in a red field, derived from the war flag of the Holy Roman Empire). This flag was carried on the carroccio during the battle of Legnano.

=== Lordship and Duchy of Milan ===
Flag of the city of Milan

Flag of the Ambrosian Republic (1447–1450)

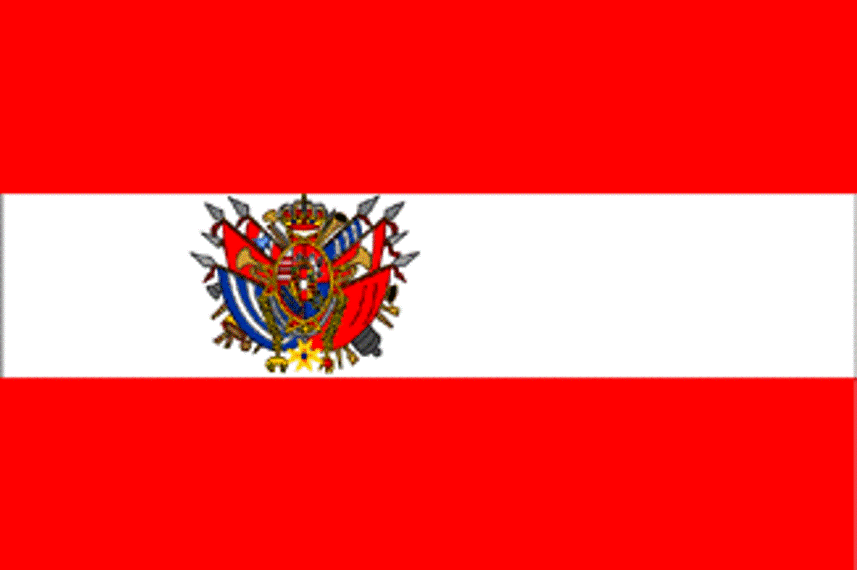
Flag of the Austrian-ruled Duchy of Milan (1765-1796)

In the second half of the 13th century the Lombard League lost its relevance, and the era of Signorie began. Milan slowly took control over most of the other cities, forming in 1395 the Duchy of Milan with Gian Galeazzo Visconti. At its height, it controlled the major part of today Northern Italy (which was called, at that time, simply Lombardy).
The city continued to use the red cross (called Saint Ambrose's Cross, taking name from Milan patron saint), At the end of the Visconti dynasty, the Duchy became for a short period a Republic, using the city's flag with superimposed a depiction of Saint Ambrose.

==== Lords' banners ====
Flag of the Lordship of Milan (1300-1395)

Flag of the Duchy of Milan (1395 and 1402–1499)

Flag of Gian Galeazzo Visconti as Count of Vertus (1395-1402)

Lord and then the Duke used the simbol of the House of Visconti, the Biscione (Bissa in Lombard). The simple version remained used as war flag, but the Imperial Eagle was jointed (by quartering) to the State flag when the emperor recognize the Visconti family rule, first as Imperial vicars (1329), later as Dukes. An exception was made between 1395 and 1402, when the Eagle was replaced by the Fleur-de-lis, because of the Duke's marriage with Isabella of France.
The Sforza family restored the Visconti's flag, that also remained during foreign dominations (but during French domination was briefly restored the version with the Fleur-de-lis), until the end of the austrian Duchy caused by the Napoleonic Wars (1796).

=== Duchy of Mantua ===
Flag of the Margraviate of Mantua (1328-1575)

Flag of the Duchy of Mantua (1575-1707)

The Duchy of Mantua was in South Lombardy. The Duchy's historic power and influence under the Gonzaga family has made it one of the main artistic, cultural, and especially musical hubs of Northern Italy and the country as a whole. Mantua also had one of the most splendid courts of Italy and Europe in the fifteenth, sixteenth, and early seventeenth centuries. From the 13th century on, the city had white flags with a red cross. In 1433, coinciding with the recognition of the marquis, four black eagles were added to the cross, and this was also the insignia of the Gonzaga family, which previously wore gold and black stripes. These flags were probably used sporadically until the partition of the principality in 1708.

=== Napoleonic era ===
==== Transpadane Republic and Cisalpine Republic ====
Flag of the Transpadane Republic

Flag of the Cisalpine Republic

During the campaign of Italy Napoleon conquered the Duchy of Milan and replaced it with the Transpadane Republic. Its flag was borrowed from the design of French flag, using red and white from Saint Ambrose's Cross, and green from the uniforms of Milan civic guard, creating the tricolore. Later Napoleon added the newly conquered territories forming the Cisalpine Republic, and then the Republic and the Kingdom of Italy.

=== Kingdom of Lombardy–Venetia ===
Flag of the Viceroy of Lombardy–Venetia

After the Vienna Congress, the territories of the Duchy of Milan and the Venetian Republic were merged to form the Kingdom of Lombardy–Venetia. Its coat of arms was created quartering the Bissa (Lombardy) and the Lion of Saint Mark (Venetia) under the Iron Crown of Lombardy, superimposed on the double-headed eagle of the Austrian Empire. The flag of the Viceroy bears the coat of arms in a yellow field.

=== Provisional Government of Milan ===
One of the flags used during the Five Days of Milan (1848)

During the Italian revolution in 1848, an uprising took place in the Austrian Milan. Similar to other places, the insurgents used the Italian tricolor, but with their own symbols.

=== Kingdom of Italy ===
In the Kingdom of Italy the regions were only statistical department. Nevertheless, in 1910 was made a proposal to give them a coat of arms: for Lombardy was chosen the Biscione, proposed again in 1927, without sequel.
