= Pro Lombardy Independence =

Pro Lombardy Independence Pro Lombardia Indipendenza
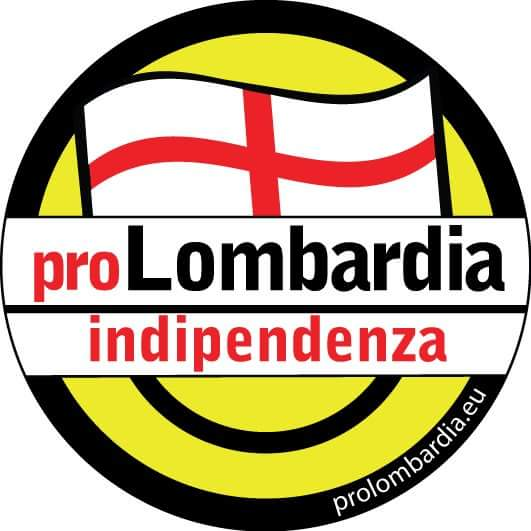
- Leader: Alfredo Gatta
- Founded: 2011
- Ideology: Separatism; Lombard nationalism Direct democracy
- National affiliation: Autonomies and Environment Pact
- European affiliation: European Free Alliance (Observer)
- Slogan: Lombardy next state in Europe

Website
- www.prolombardia.eu

Pro Lombardy Independence (Pro Lombardia Indipendenza) was an independentist party active in Lombardy, Italy.

The party, which was launched in 2011, was led by Alfredo Gatta; the spokesman is Alessandro Ceresoli.

The first objective of the party was the independence of the present-day Lombardy region, but it hopes for a unification of the 'Historical Lombardy', which in its eyes includes Emilia (part of the Emilia-Romagna region), the provinces of Novara and Verbano-Cusio-Ossola and the commune of Tortona (all three part of the Piedmont Region), and the 'Swiss Lombardia' (the Canton of Ticino and parts of the Canton of Graubünden).

According to its former president Giovanni Roversi, 'We don't want independence to build walls nor in opposition to other peoples: for us, a Sicilian is a European brother as is a citizen from Bavaria or from Galicia. We have an inclusive speech”.

The party was a member of the European Free Alliance.

== Leadership ==
- President: Alberto Reboldi (2011–2013), Giovanni Roversi (2013–2019), Alfredo Gatta (2019-present)
- Spokesperson: Giacomo Consalez (2013–2015), Giovanni Roversi (2011–2013), Juri Orsi (2015–2019), Alessandro Ceresoli (2019–present)
