= Gignese =

- Comune
- Comune di Gignese
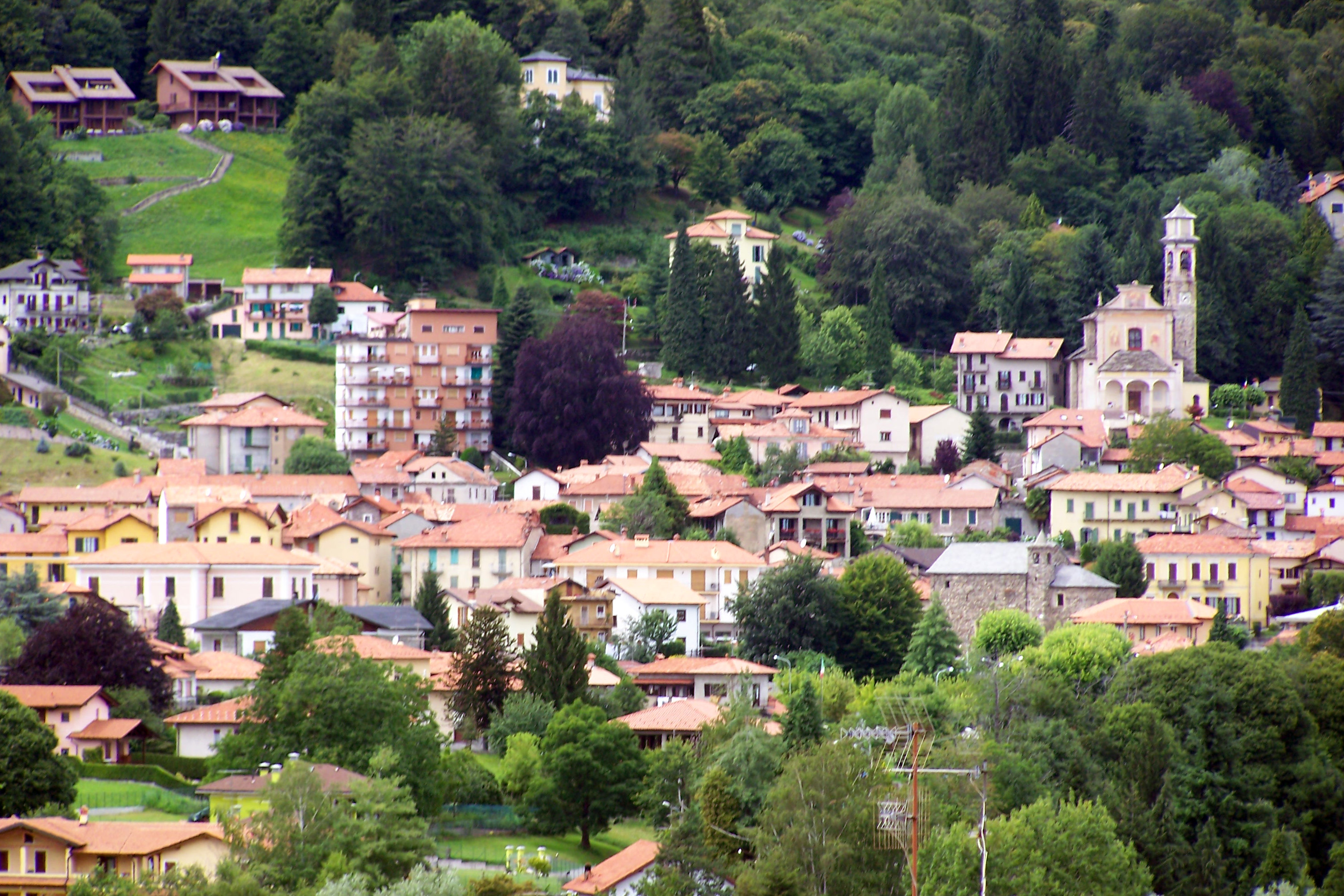
- View of Gignese

- Location within Italy Location within Piedmont
- Coordinates: 45°52′N 8°31′E
- Country: Italy
- Region: Piedmont
- Province: Province of Verbano-Cusio-Ossola (VB)
- Frazioni: Alpino, Nocco, Vezzo

Area
  - Total: 14.9 km^{2} (5.8 sq mi)
- Elevation: 707 m (2,320 ft)

Population (Dec. 2004)
  - Total: 913
  - Density: 61.3/km^{2} (159/sq mi)
- Demonym: Gignesini
- Time zone: UTC+1 (CET)
  - Summer (DST): UTC+2 (CEST)
- Postal code: 28040
- Dialing code: 0323
- Website: Official website

Gignese is a comune (municipality) in the Province of Verbano-Cusio-Ossola in the Italian region Piedmont, located about 110 kilometres (68 mi) northeast of Turin and about 8 kilometres (5 mi) south of Verbania. As of 31 December 2022, it had a population of 1065 and an area of 14.9 square kilometres (5.8 mi^{2}).

The municipality of Gignese contains the frazioni (subdivisions, mainly villages and hamlets) Alpino, Nocco, and Vezzo.

Gignese borders the following municipalities: Armeno, Brovello-Carpugnino, Omegna, Stresa.

== Demographic evolution ==
Historical population

Year	Pop.	±%
1861	1,016	—
1871	959	−5.6%
1881	956	−0.3%
1901	783	−18.1%
1911	871	+11.2%

Year	Pop.	±%
1921	871	+0.0%
1931	927	+6.4%
1936	927	+0.0%
1951	873	−5.8%
1961	874	+0.1%

Year	Pop.	±%
1971	951	+8.8%
1981	855	−10.1%
1991	850	−0.6%
2001	789	−7.2%

Source: Data from ISTAT
