= Bergamasque Autonomist Movement =

The Bergamascque Autonomist Movement (Italian: Movimento Autonomista Bergamasco; Lombard: Moviment Autonomista Bergamasch), shortened to MAB, was an autonomist, federalist and anti-fascist party founded in 1956 by Guido Calderoli, dentist and grandfather of the current Italian politician Roberto Calderoli.

== History ==
An autonomist movement in the area of Bergamo was present since the end of World War II, when the Italian Constitution established regions. Since it was taking long to activate them, a movement linked to the Italian Republican Party and its MP Giulio Bergmann started to pressure for their activation (this would not happen until 1970). In 1956 the movement became a Party in order to run for the municipal and provincial elections; they won a seat in each assembly, sending Calderoli, later substituted by Gianfranco Gonella, to the Municipal Council and Ugo Gavazzeni to the Provincial Council.

In 1958 Calderoli decided to run with other autonomist parties from Lombardy and the entire Northern Italy founding then the Autonomist Lombard Regional Movement and the Autonomist Padanian Regional Movement, which ran in the following national election to the Senate. They had a loss of votes and earned no seats, which made the majority of the MAB to join the Christian Democracy in 1960; the remaining minority founded a new party called "Autonomists", which later lost all the former MAB seats and soon disbanded.

== Political views ==
The MAB supported self-government for Italy’s regions and territories but did not advocate secession. It promoted the use of regional languages in education and public administration. The movement opposed large-scale migration from Southern Italy, arguing that such internal population shifts reflected structural weaknesses within the state.

The MAB held a strong anti-fascist stance, maintaining that a decentralized government structure reduces the risk of authoritarianism. Part of the movement’s program drew inspiration from documents produced by the Lombard Catholic Green Partisans.

== Links with the Northern League ==
Some describe the MAB as an ideological ancestor of the Northern League. While there are some points of commonality, there are also important differences between the two movements.

Both parties had a similar vision about autonomy, local cultures and Rome being an oppressive bureaucratic centre, but they differed on their regard to Italy: the MAB was in favour of a united country while the Northern League even advocated independence. Some mottos and symbols of the MAB were later reused by the League, like the "golden goose" whose eggs are stolen by Rome or the image of Alberto da Giussano; and some hypothesize that Innocente Calderoli, Guido's son and early League activist, had a role on the acquisition of the old mottos.
