= Stefano Bruno Galli =

Italian professor and politician

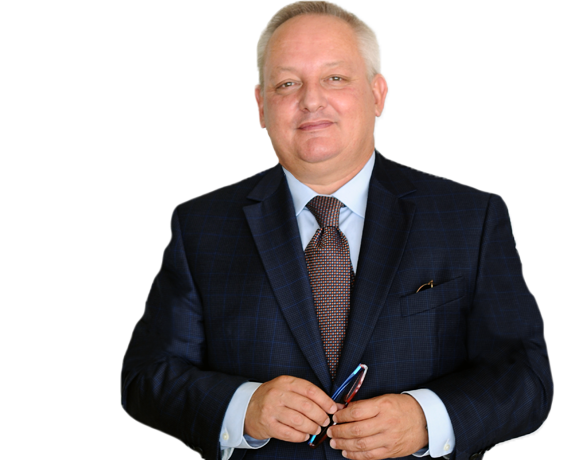
Galli

Stefano Bruno Galli is an Italian professor and politician who is considered an expert in Lombard nationalism and culture.

He teaches political science at the University of Milan and is well known for his publications about constitutions, nationalism and autonomism. He was elected to the Lombard Regional Council in 2013 and he was nominated Regional Minister of Culture and Autonomy in 2018 by Attilio Fontana.

== Publications ==
- La Lombardia si merita l'autonomia (Milan, 2017)
- Interventi intraprendenti. Lombardismo Autonomismo Federalismo (Milan, 2017)
- Serve un No. Riflessioni su una pessima riforma costituzionale (Roma, 2016)
- G. Miglio, Lo scienziato della politica (Milan, 2015)
- Émile Chanoux, federalismo e autonomie (Milan, 2014)
- Il Nord e la Macroregione alpina (Milan, 2013)
- Le ragioni del grande Nord. Interventi su federalismo, secessione, Europa dei popoli (Turin, 2012)
- Il Grande Nord. Cultura e destino della Questione settentrionale (Milan, 2012)
- Manifesto dell'autonomia (2022)
- Lombardia è capitale culturale (2018-2023)

== Bibliography ==
- Regione Lombardia
- Osservatorio Metropolitano di Milano
