= Flag of Milan =

Flag of the City of Milan

The flag of the city of Milan.

The flag of Milan consists of a red cross on a white field. Whilst similar to the Cross of Saint George, the flag instead symbolises the connection between Saint Ambrose and the city of Milan.

== History ==
The association between the red cross on a white field and the city of Milan dates back to the 4th century. Saint Ambrose had been the Bishop of Milan between 374 and 397, and as a result of his influence his symbol, the red cross on a field of white became associated with the Bishop of Milan.

In 1176 the Lombard League faced the forces of the Holy Roman Empire, led by Fredrick Barbarossa, at the Battle of Legnano. Upon hearing about the arrival of the Holy Roman army, the Lombard infantry constructed a carroccio, a sacred war wagon which displayed a vexillum, to take into battle. The infantry affixed the symbol of the Bishop of Milan, Aribert, to the wagon and displayed it during the battle. The connotations between the victorious battle and the flag led to a greater association between the city and the symbol. Between 1395 and 1447, the Duchy of Milan used the arms of the ruling House of Visconti, the biscione, a great serpent shown devouring a Saracen. This standard greatly replaced the Cross of Saint Ambrose in Milan. In 1397 the Duke of Milan, Gian Galeazzo Visconti, was granted the usage of the imperial eagle by Emperor Wenceslaw. The flag of the Duchy of Milan then became the arms of House Visconti quarted with the imperial eagle of the Holy Roman Empire.

The red and white of flag of Milan most likely contributed to the green-white-red uniforms of the Milan City Militia which had fought against Napoleon during the French First Republic's invasion of Italy. The colours were then chosen by Napoleon for the flag of the Cisalpine Republic in 1797. This flag would later go on to inspire the current Italian Tricolour.

== Modern-day use ==
The flag of Milan appears on the crest of Serie A side AC Milan.

Pro-Lombardy independence parties, Lega Lombarda and Pro Lombardia Indipendenza, both use the flag as a symbol for their movements.

The logo of the car manufacturer Alfa Romeo, originally based in Milan, incorporates the cross from the flag.

== Gallery ==
Flags of Milan

First flag of Milan of which there is a documented trace (1171)

State Flag ( Vexillum publicum ) of the City of Milan from 12th century

The flag of the Lordship of Milan (1329–1395)

The flag of the Duchy of Milan (1395–1447, 1450–1499 and 1526–1796)

The flag of French Milan (1499–1526)

State flag ( Vexillum publicum ) of the Golden Ambrosian Republic (1447–1450)

== See also ==
- St George's Cross
- Biscione
- Flag of England, a nearly identical flag.
