= Biscione =

Heraldic animal

The coat of arms of the Visconti of Milan showing the biscione wearing a crown

The biscione (Note: Italian: [biʃˈʃoːne]; pl.: biscioni; Milanese: bissa ([ˈbisa]) or bisson ([biˈsũː]).) (English: "big grass snake"), less commonly known also as the vipera, (Note: Italian: [ˈviːpera], meaning viper; pl.: vipere.) is in heraldry a charge consisting of a divine serpent with a child in its mouth; the serpent may be variously described as being in the act of swallowing the child, or the child may be emerging from its mouth.

It is a historic symbol of the city of Milan, originally on the coat-of-arms of the Visconti and Sforza dynasties. The logo of Alfa Romeo, established in Milan, features the flag of Milan and the biscione as a symbol of the city.

== History ==
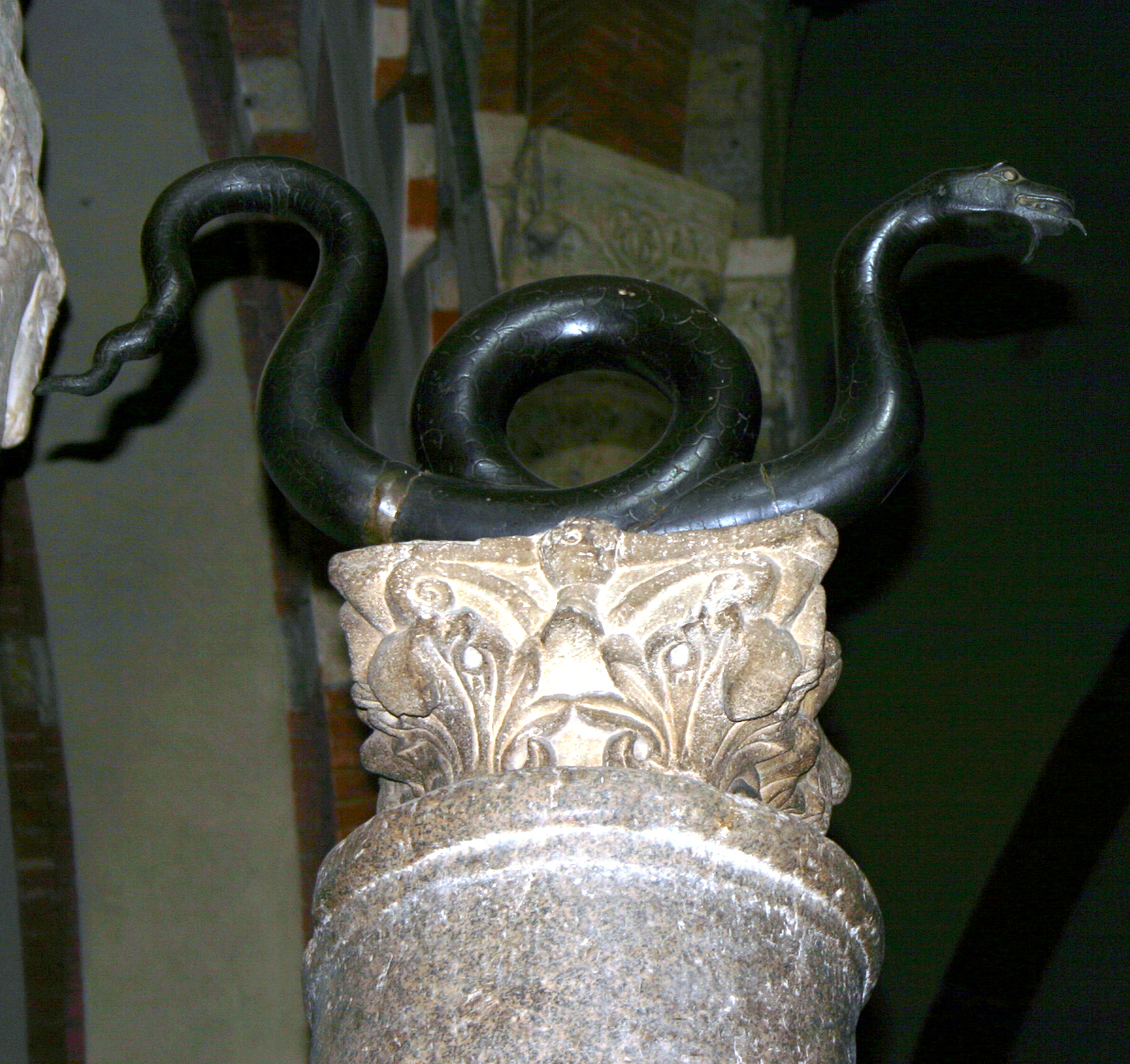
The bronzed serpent brought to Milan from Constantinople in the 11th century, today in the Basilica of Sant'Ambrogio, is thought to have inspired the biscione.

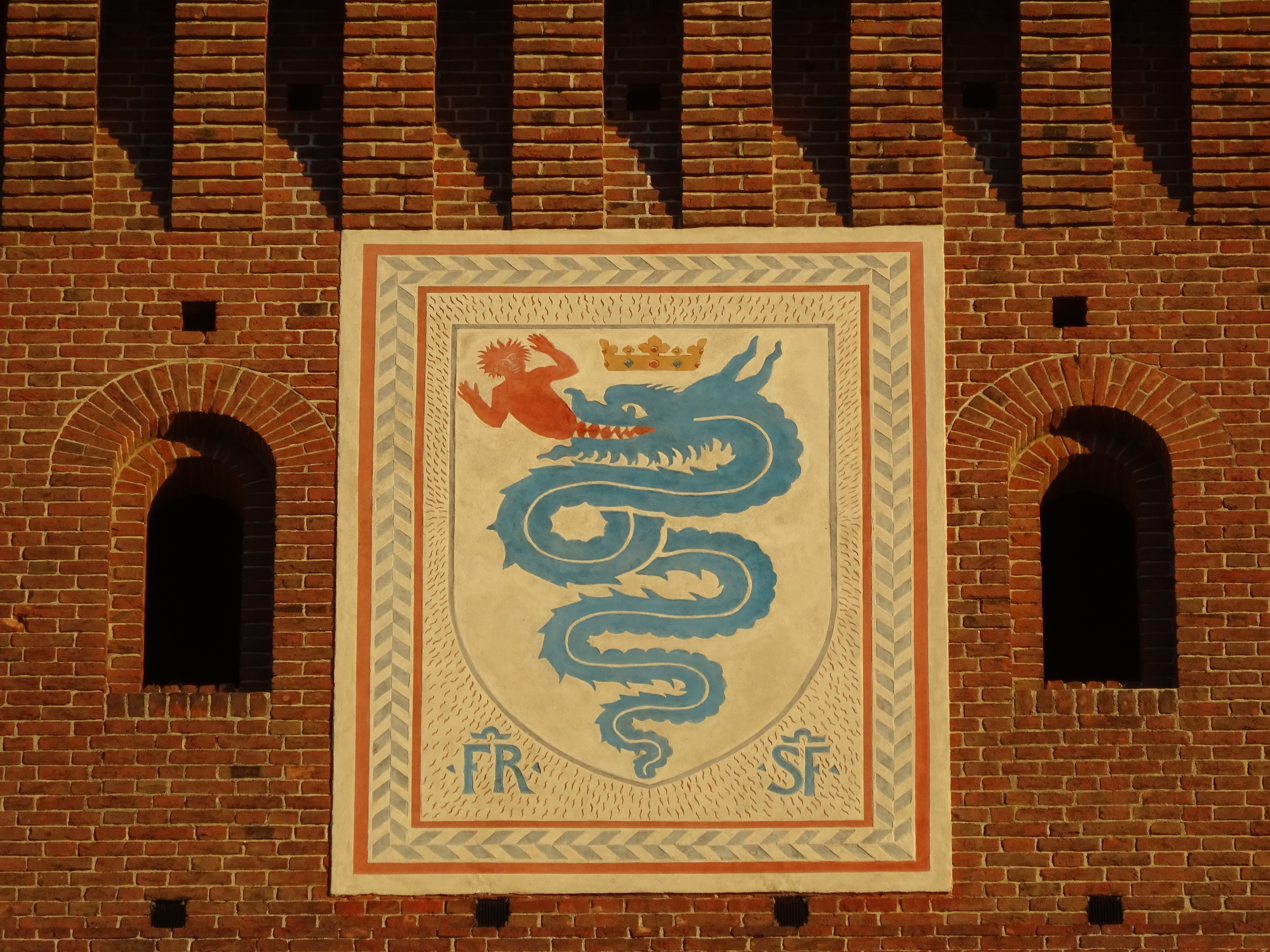
The biscione on the interior facade of the Filarete Tower (Torre del Filarete) at the Sforza Castle in Milan. FR and SF at the bottom signify Francesco Sforza, the Duke of Milan between 1450 and 1466.

Etymologically, word biscione is a masculine augmentative of Italian feminine biscia "grass snake" (corrupted from bistia, ultimately from Latin bestia "beast").

The charge became associated with the city after the Visconti family gained control over Milan 1277; Bonvesin da la Riva records it in his De magnalibus urbis Mediolani (On the Marvels of the City of Milan) as a Visconti symbol no later than the end of the 13th century. The symbol may have been derived from a bronzed serpent brought to Milan from Constantinople by Arnolf II of Arsago (Archbishop of Milan 998–1018) in the 11th century.

One of the oldest depictions of the Biscione is in the Great Hall of the Visconti Castle of Angera. The hall was painted at the end of the 13th century with frescoes celebrating Archbishop Ottone Visconti's victory against the rival family of the Della Torre. The viper swallowing a small human figure is depicted in the pendentives of the hall.

The biscione remained associated with the Duchy of Milan even after the Visconti line died out in the 15th century. The House of Sforza incorporated the symbol into their armorial after taking the duchy.

A Renaissance Milanese writer described the insignia of the Duke of Milan in 1531:

Exiliens infans sinuosi e faucibus anguis, Est gentilitiis nobile stemma tuis. Talia Pellaeum gesisse nomismata regem, Vidimus, hisque suum concelebrare genus. Dum se Ammone satum, matrem anguis imagine lusam, Divini & sobolem seminis esse docet. Ore exit tradunt sic quosdam enitier angues, An quia sic Pallas de capite orta Iovis.

An infant bursting from the maw of a coiling serpent marks the noble lineage of your clan. We have observed that the Pellaean king had coinage with such a device and by it celebrated his own descent, proclaiming that he was begotten of Ammon, that his mother was beguiled by the form of a snake and the child was the offspring of divine seed. The infant emerges from the mouth. They say that some snakes come to birth that way. Or is it because Pallas sprang like this from the head of Jove?

— Andrea Alciato

== Contemporary use ==
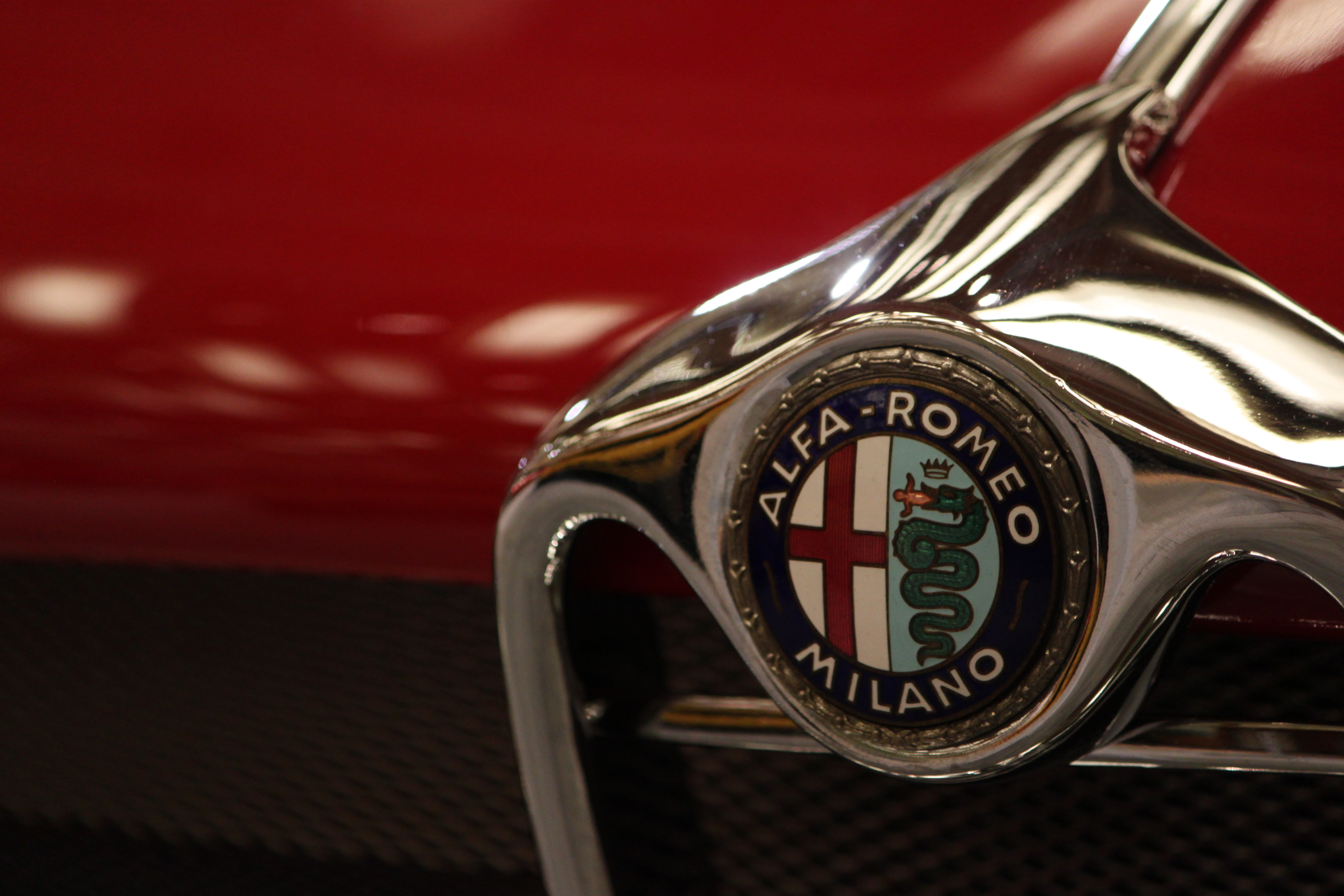
Logo of Alfa Romeo, established in Milan in 1910, with the flag of Milan and the biscione as the city's symbol.

As a symbol of Milan, the biscione is used by multiple organizations associated with or based in the city.

The logo of automobile manufacturer Alfa Romeo (also known as the Casa del Biscione, Italian for "House of the Biscione" or "Biscione['s] marque"), established in Milan in 1910, features the flag of Milan and the biscione as the city's symbol.

The biscione is also depicted in the logo of Milanese espresso machine manufacturer Bezzera, who in 1901 invented one of the earliest patented espresso machines and the first that could brew individual servings, which has become a standard adopted by all manufacturers.

Football club Inter Milan is commonly represented by a biscione, and the team's 2010–11 and 2021–22 away shirts prominently featured the symbol.

The late Italian media mogul and former Prime Minister of Italy Silvio Berlusconi, who was born and raised in Milan, used stylized biscione symbols in the logos for his companies Mediaset and Fininvest (with the child replaced by a flower); his residential zones Milano Due and Milano Tre and the Mediaset-owned television channel Canale 5 also use biscione-inspired imagery.

Outside Milan, a similar design is found in the seals of the Hungarian nobleman Nicholas I Garai, palatine to the King of Hungary (1375–1385). Here the crowned snake devours a sovereign's orb, rather than a human. The arms of the towns of Sanok in Poland and Pruzhany in Belarus also feature the symbol, honoring the marriage of Bona Sforza to Sigismund I of Poland while both towns were part of Poland–Lithuania.

== Similar symbols ==
Comparable to the biscione are some depictions of the Hindu deity Matsya. While his form is referred to as anthropomorphically having a humanoid upper half, and his lower half as that of a fish, some depictions show him with his upper body emerging from the mouth of a fish. In early Christian art of the catacombs, the Old Testament prophet Jonah is depicted as a man being swallowed by a serpent-like Leviathan, a sea creature of Hebrew myth.

== Coats of arms, flags and symbols bearing the biscione ==
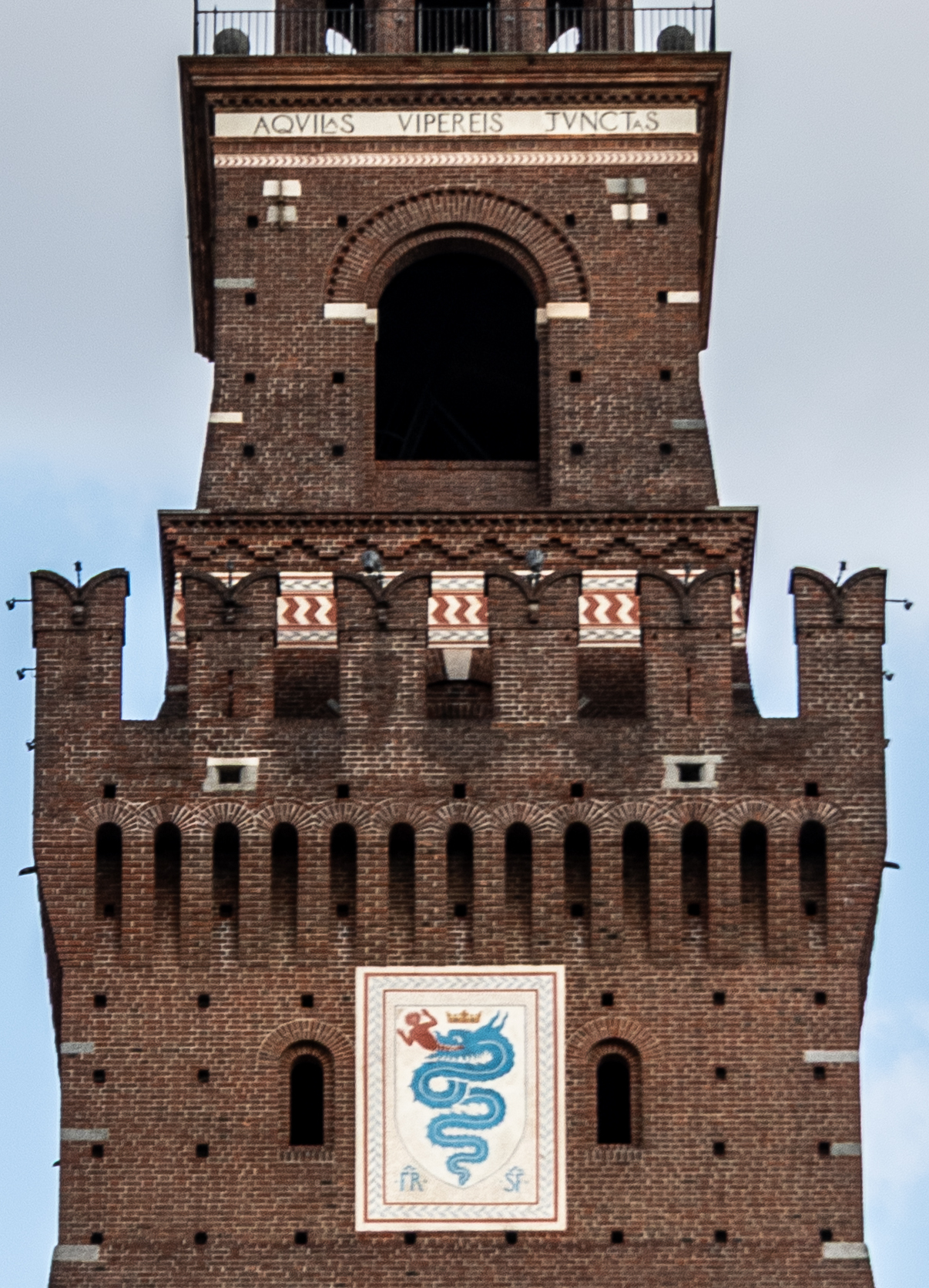
AQVILAS VIPEREIS JVNCTAS [Eagles joined with Vipers], inscribed on Sforza Castle's Filarete Tower, signifies Francesco Sforza's marriage to Bianca Maria Visconti, daughter of the last Visconti duke.

- Province of Alessandria
  - Quargnento
- Province of Asti
  - Asti, Rione San Silvestro
- Province of Bergamo
  - Brignano Gera d'Adda
  - Castel Rozzone
  - Misano di Gera d'Adda
  - Pagazzano
- Province of Brescia
  - Borgo San Giacomo
  - Maclodio
- Province of Como
  - Carimate
  - Eupilio
  - Lomazzo
- Province of Cremona
  - Azzanello
  - Castelvisconti
  - Corte de' Cortesi con Cignone
  - Piadena
  - Rivarolo del Re ed Uniti
- Province of Lecco
  - Bellano
  - Cesana Brianza
- Province of Lodi
  - Bertonico
  - Castelnuovo Bocca d'Adda
  - San Fiorano
- Province of Mantua
  - Goito
- Province of Milan
  - Arconate
  - Gessate
  - Gudo Visconti
  - Milan, reverse of the comunal Gonfalon
  - Motta Visconti
  - San Zenone al Lambro
- Province of Monza and Brianza
  - Macherio
- Province of Novara
  - Bogogno
  - Divignano
  - Fara Novarese
  - Invorio
  - Massino Visconti
  - Pisano
  - Oleggio Castello
- Province of Parma
  - Montechiarugolo
- Province of Pavia
  - Alagna
  - Casorate Primo
  - Certosa di Pavia
  - Marcignago
  - Santa Cristina e Bissone
  - Torrevecchia Pia
  - Zerbolò
- Province of Sondrio
  - Ardenno
  - Grosotto
- Province of Varese
  - Angera
  - Besnate
  - Besnate, Rione Bissun
  - Brusimpiano
  - Cassano Magnago
  - Cassano Valcuvia
  - Caronno Pertusella
  - Caronno Varesino
  - Cuvio
  - Fagnano Olona
  - Samarate
  - Tradate
  - Lonate Pozzolo, Rione Bissa
- Province of Verbano-Cusio-Ossola
  - Brovello-Carpugnino
  - Mergozzo
- Canton Ticino
  - Bellinzona (City and District)
  - Biasca
  - Bissone
  - Malvaglia, part of Serravalle
  - Sant'Antonio, part of Bellinzona

Following the historical-dynastic events linked to the Visconti and Sforza families, the biscione appears as part of the municipal coat of arms also of cities and municipalities in Central-Eastern Europe:

- Bavaria: Dachau
- Belorussia: Pruzhany (City and District)
- Poland: Gmina Dłutów and Sanok

Historically, it appeared in the coats of arms of the following states:

- Lordship of Milan
- Duchy of Milan
- Kingdom of Italy (Napoleonic)
- Kingdom of Lombardy-Venetia

== See also ==
- Flag of Milan
- Guivre
- History of Milan
- Basilisk
- Leviathan
- Ouroboros
- Symbols of Milan
- Germanic dragon
- Lindworm

== Gallery ==
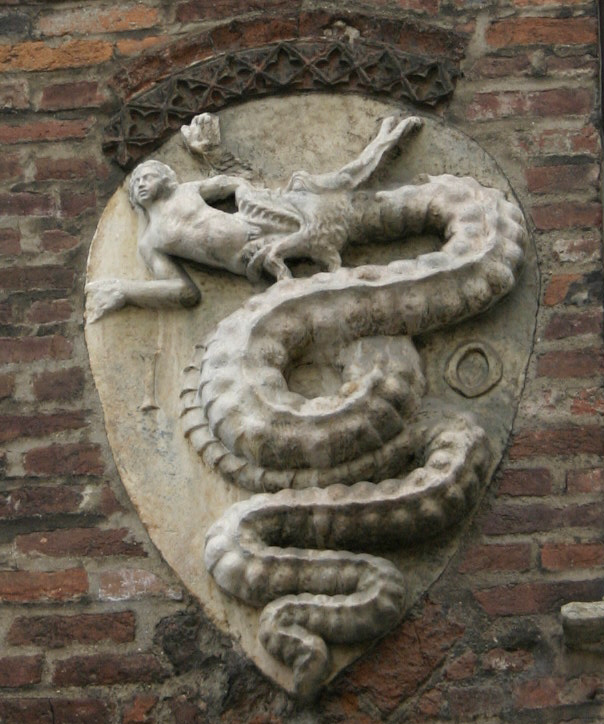
Depiction of the biscione swallowing a child, the coat of arms of the House of Visconti, on the Archbishop's palace in Piazza Duomo in Milan, Italy

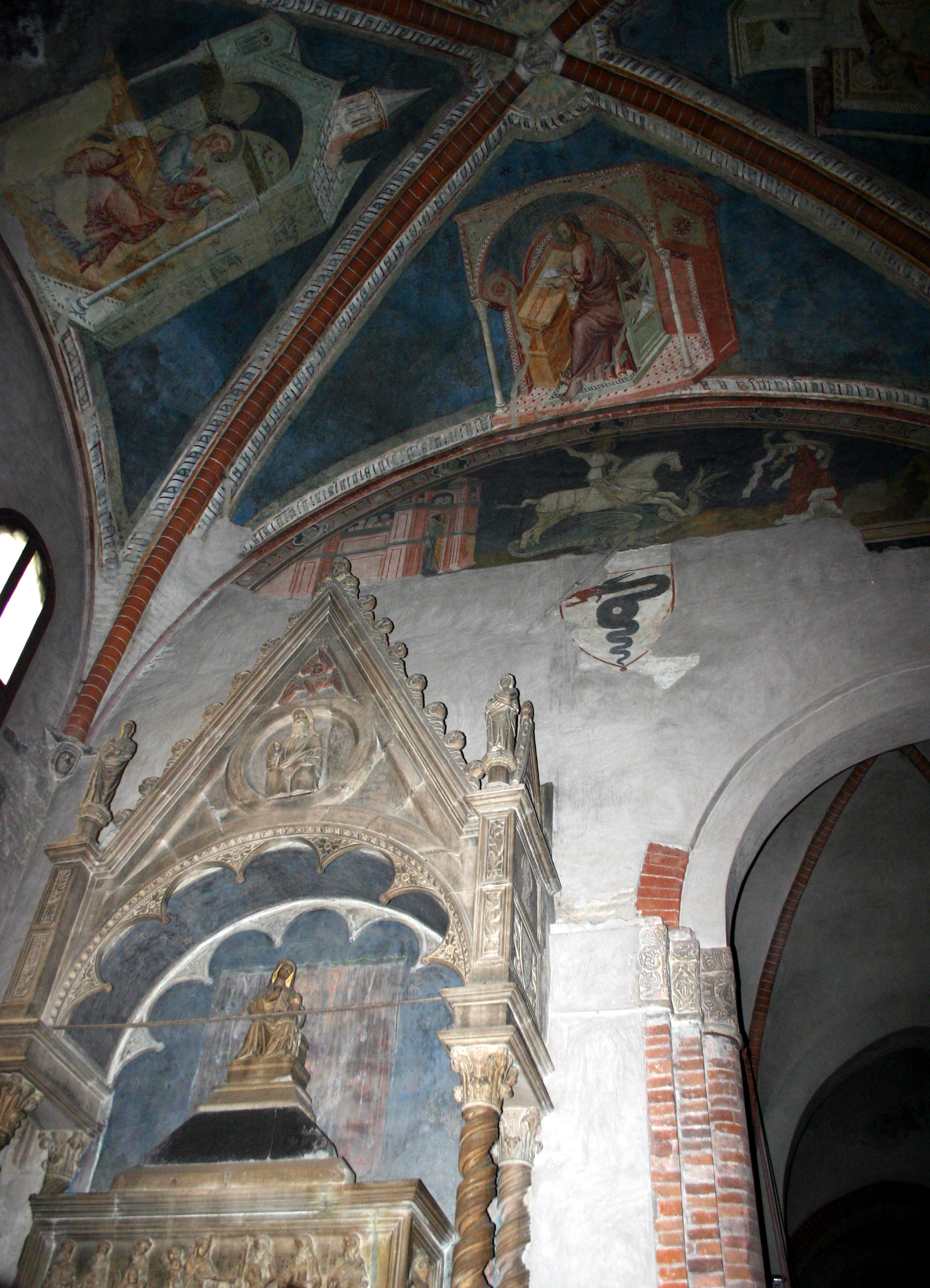
The biscione above the tomb of Stefano Visconti and Valentina Doria in the Basilica of Sant'Eustorgio

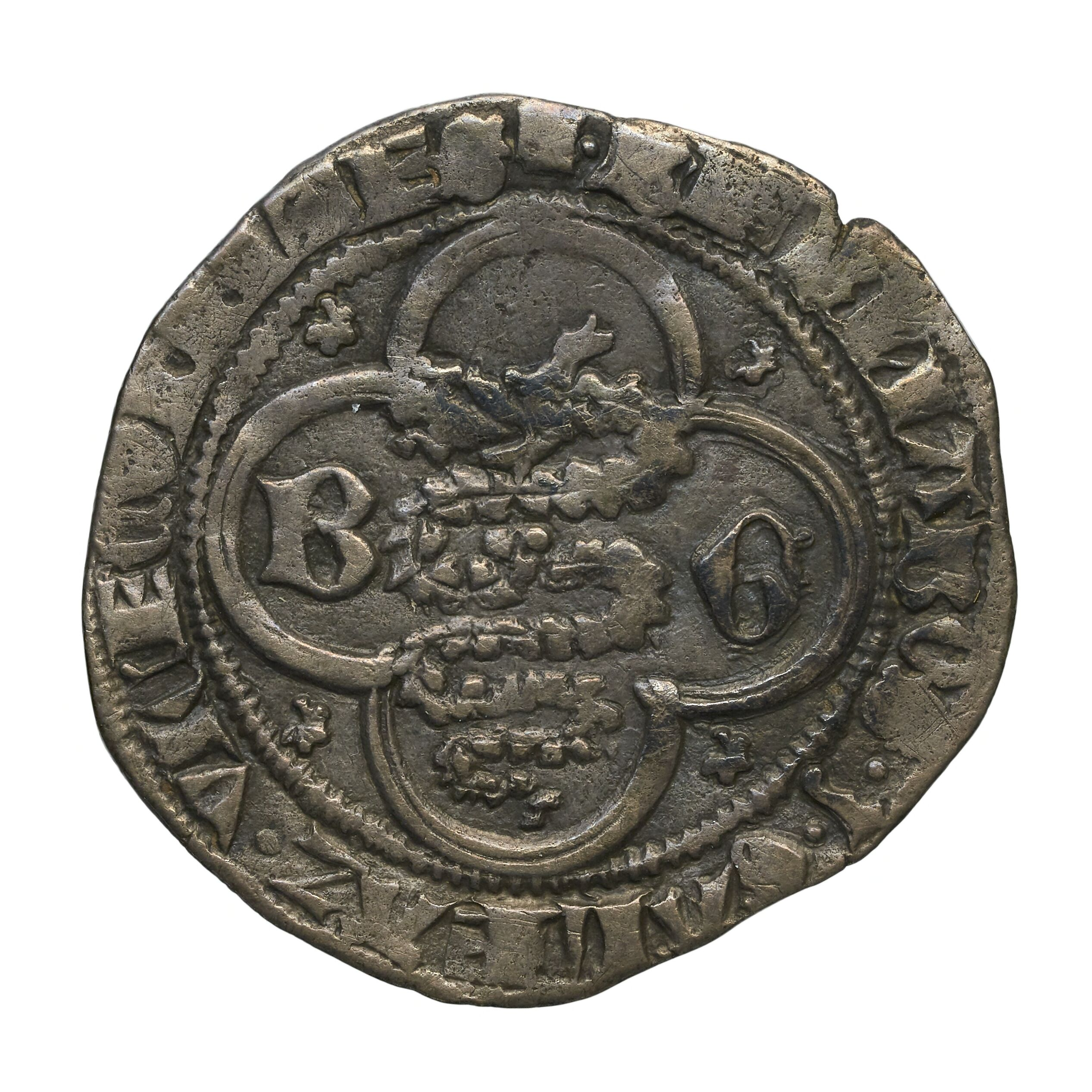
Coinage of the Lordship of Milan, featuring a biscione

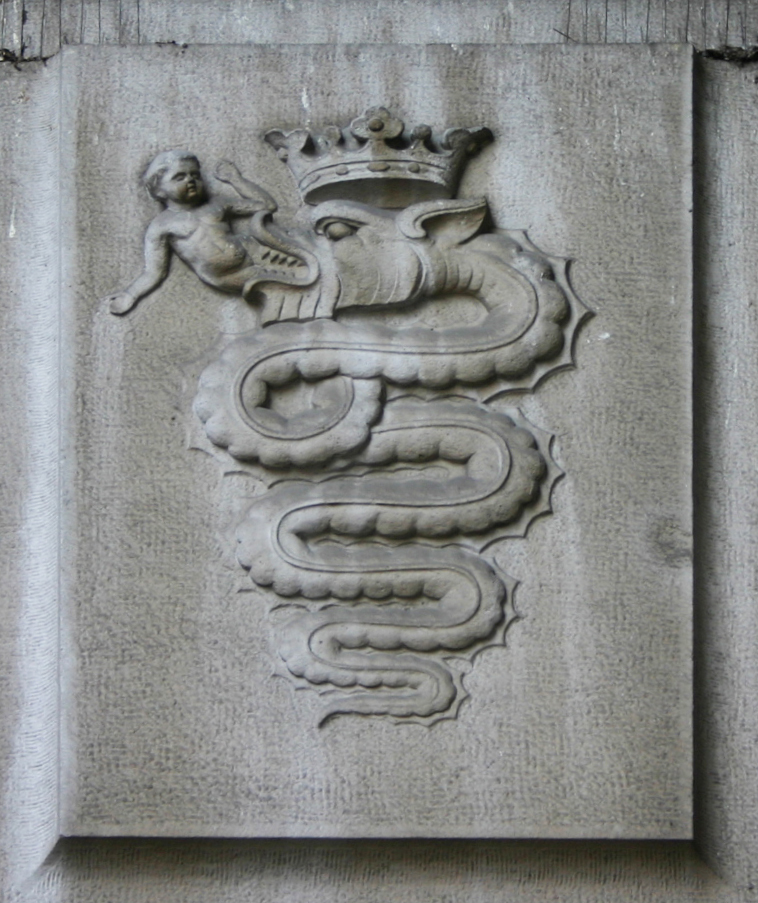
Milano Centrale railway station, 1931

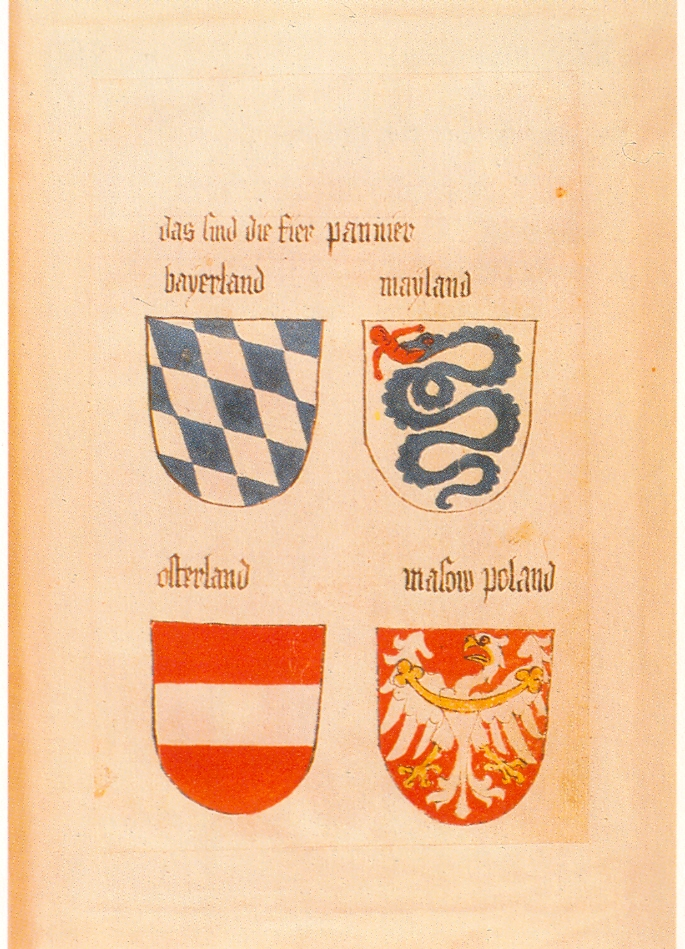
Ingeram Codex, 1459

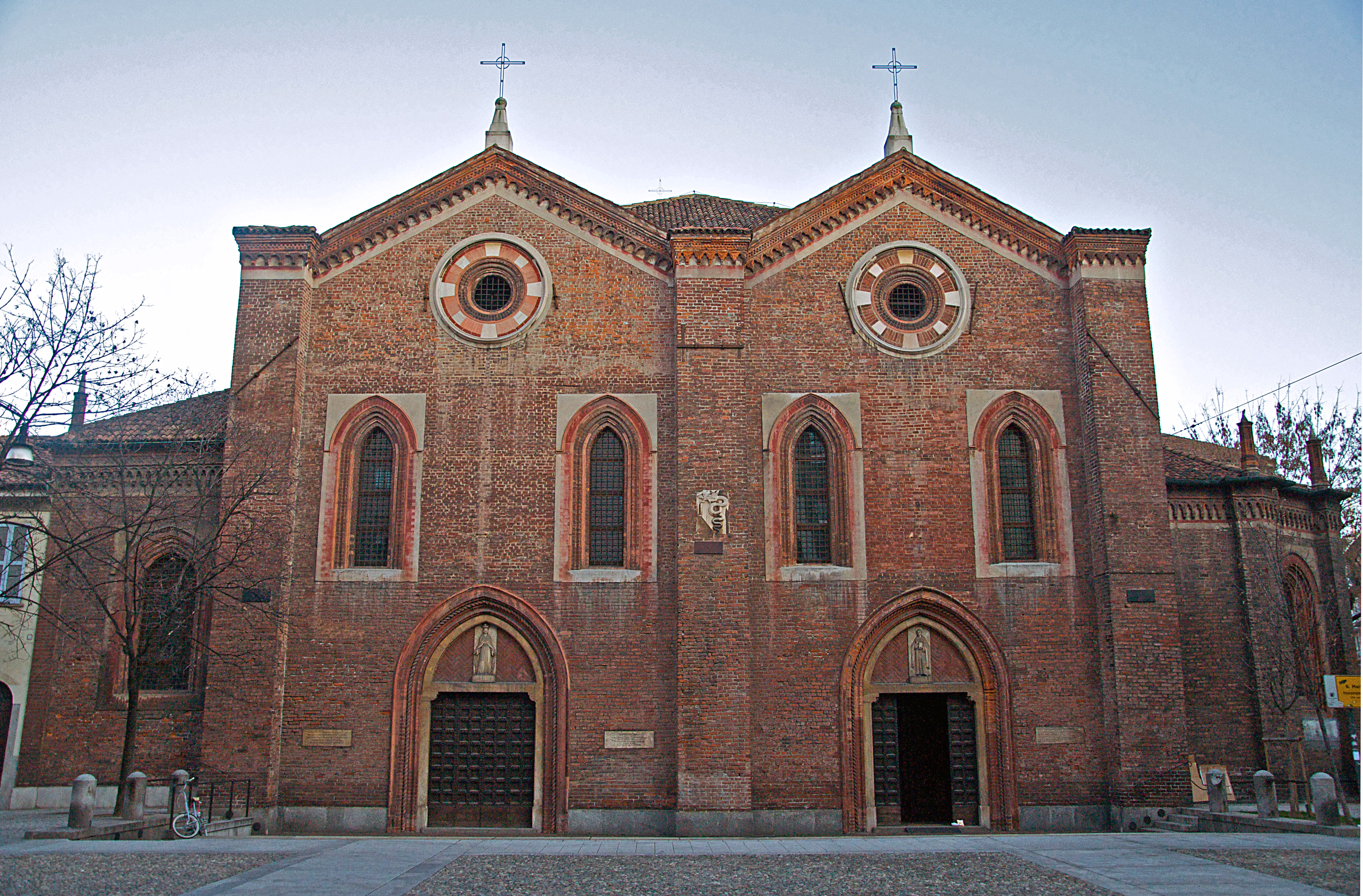
The biscione on the facade of the Santa Maria Incoronata, 15th century

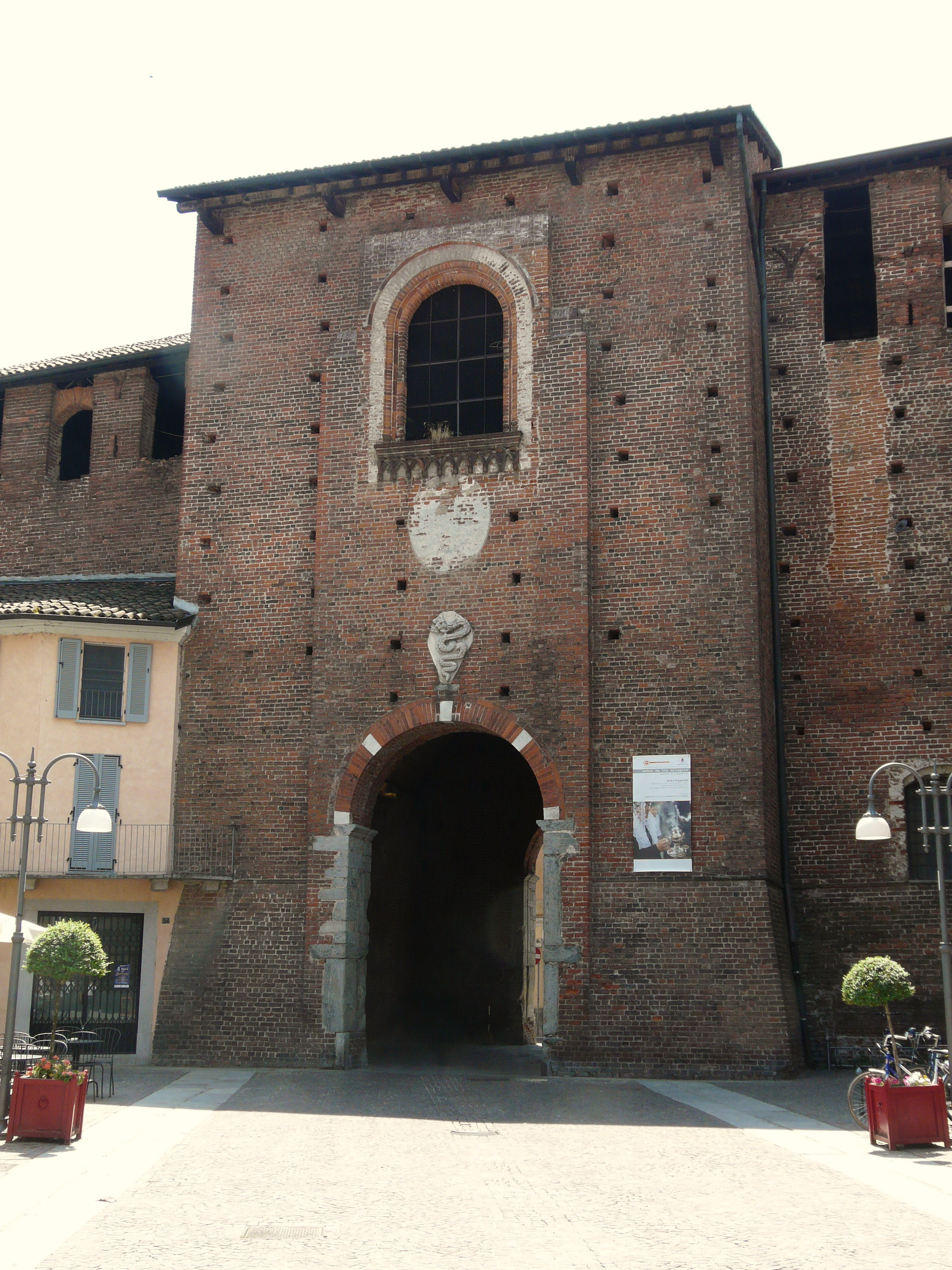
Gate of Vigevano

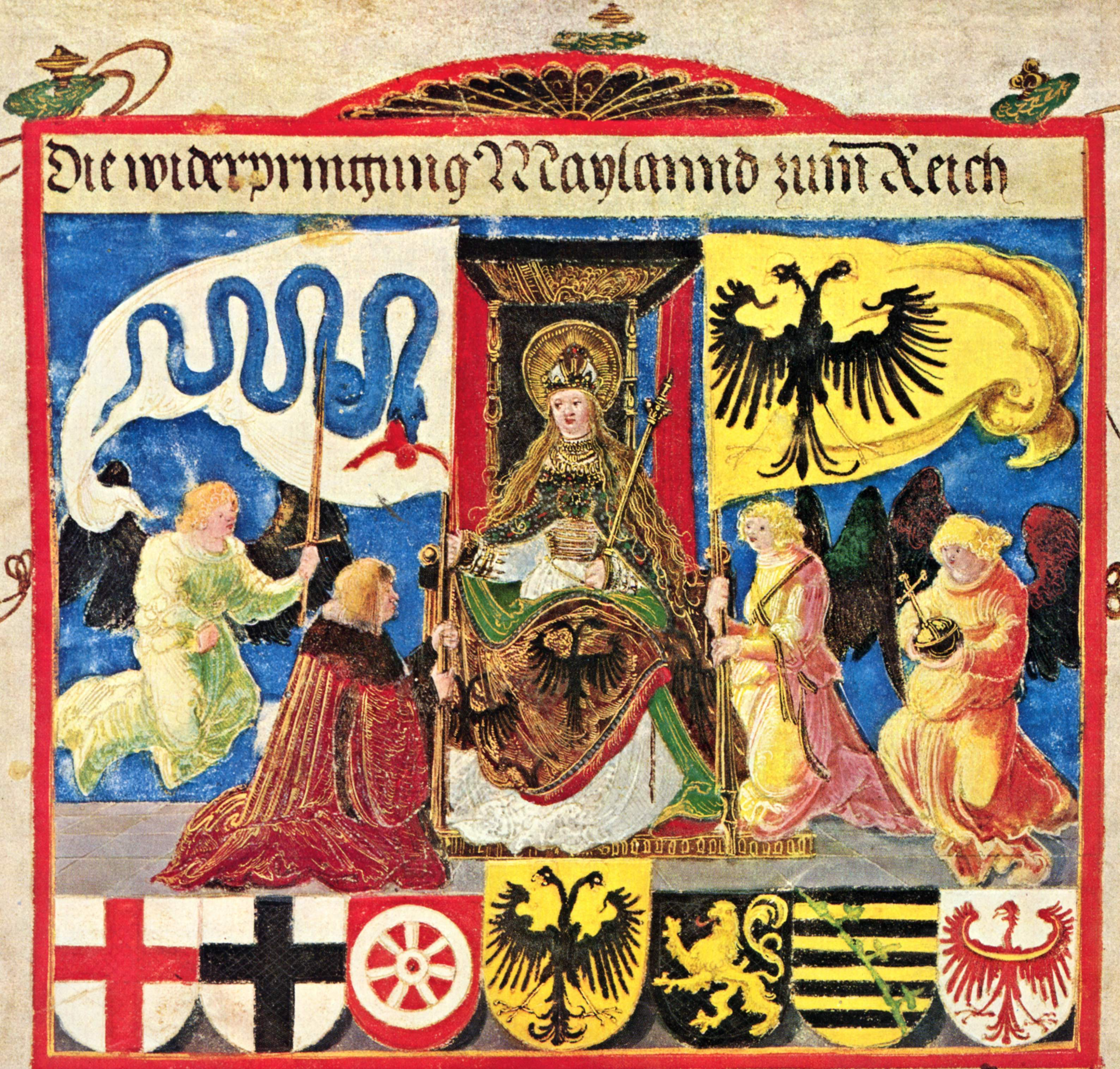
"The restoration of Milan to the Empire"
