= Brovello-Carpugnino =

- Comune
- Comune di Brovello-Carpugnino
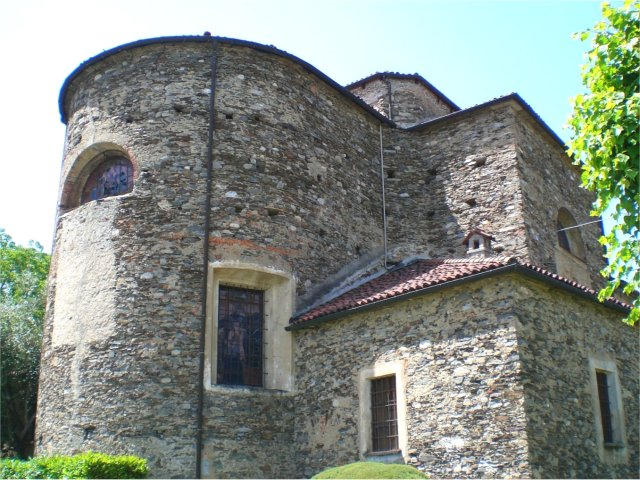
- Saint Roch church.

- Coat of arms

- Location within Italy Location within Piedmont
- Coordinates: 45°49′N 8°27′E
- Country: Italy
- Region: Piedmont
- Province: Verbano-Cusio-Ossola (VB)

Government
  - Mayor: Giuseppe Bono

Area
  - Total: 8.3 km^{2} (3.2 sq mi)
- Elevation: 445 m (1,460 ft)

Population (Dec. 2004)
  - Total: 607
  - Density: 73/km^{2} (190/sq mi)
- Demonym: Brovellesi
- Time zone: UTC+1 (CET)
  - Summer (DST): UTC+2 (CEST)
- Postal code: 28010
- Dialing code: 0323
- Website: Official website

Brovello-Carpugnino is a comune (municipality) in the Province of Verbano-Cusio-Ossola in the Italian region Piedmont, located about 100 kilometres (62 mi) northeast of Turin and about 14 kilometres (9 mi) southwest of Verbania. As of 31 December 2004, it had a population of 607 and an area of 8.3 square kilometres (3.2 mi^{2}).

Brovello-Carpugnino borders the following municipalities: Armeno, Gignese, Lesa, Massino Visconti, Stresa.
