= Lombardy (historical region) =

Italian historical region

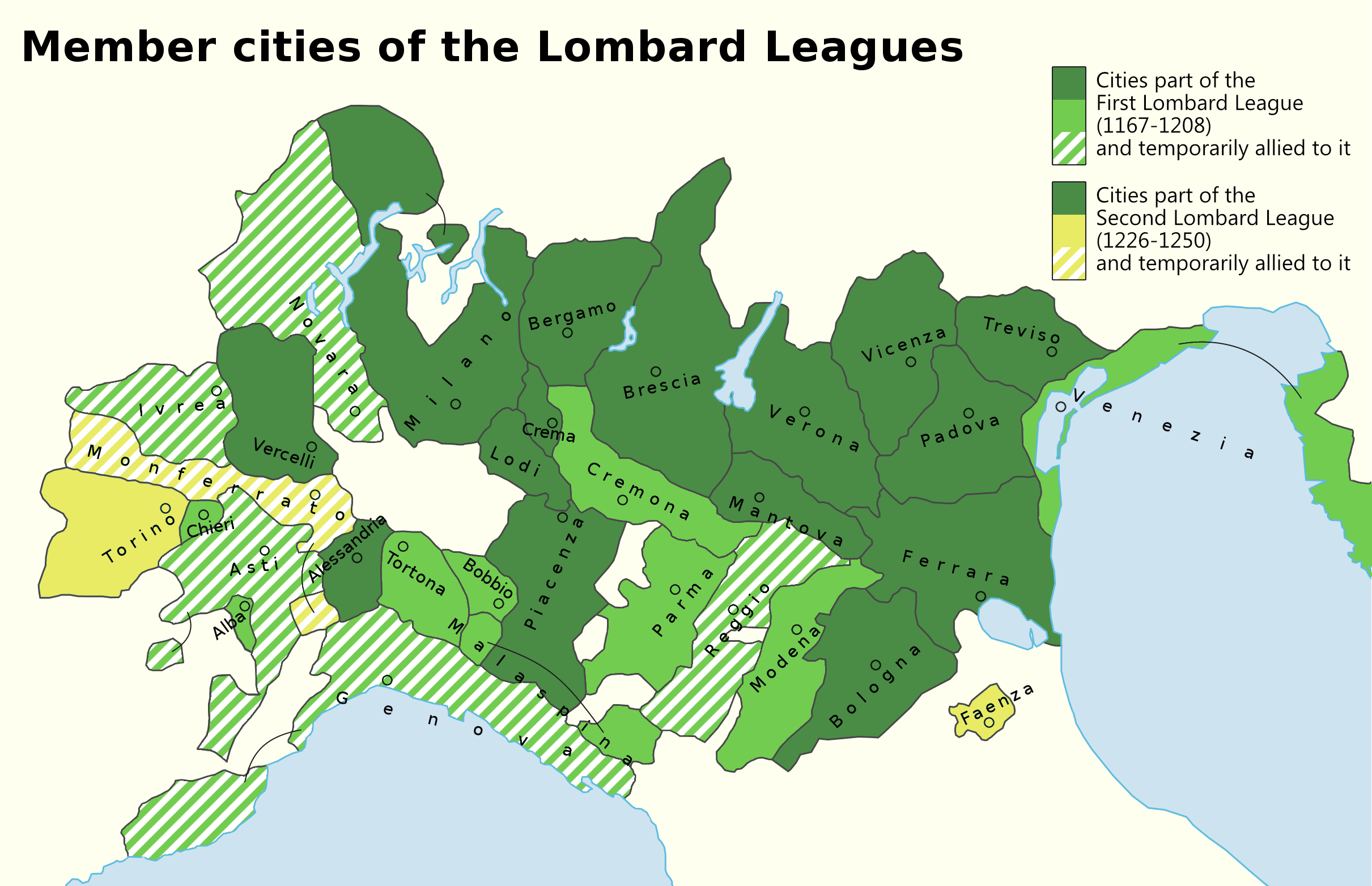
The Lombard League.

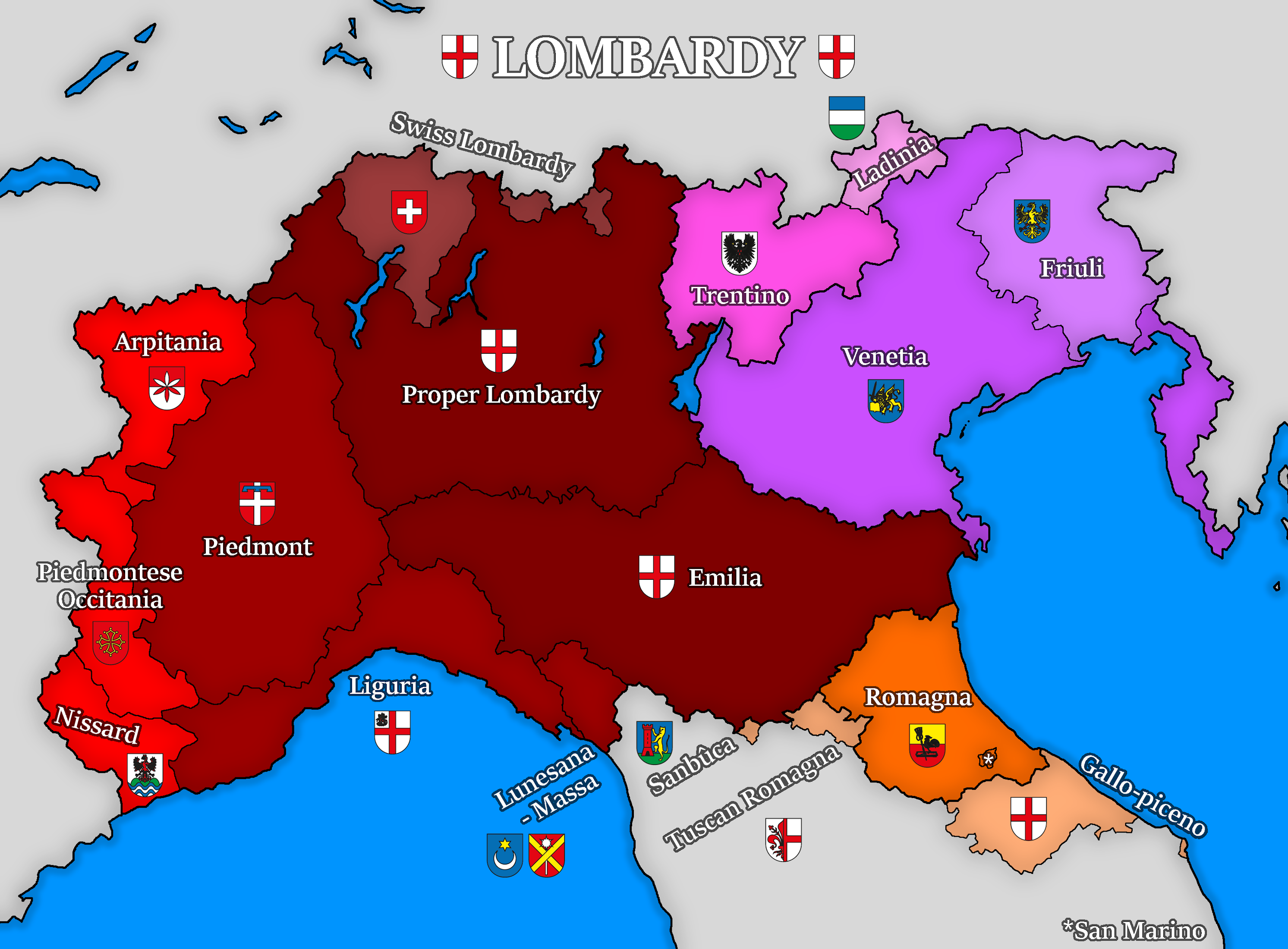
Map of Historical Lombardy

Lombardy (Lombard: Lombardia), also called Historical Lombardy (Lombardia storega) or Greater Lombardy (Granda Lombardia), is a name referring to the territory, larger than the modern administrative region of Italy, which culturally, linguistically and politically has been historically considered Lombard.

Originally synonymous with Northern Italy, the definition of Lombardy shrank over time: Dante Alighieri, in his De vulgari eloquentia, recognised the autonomy of Romagna and Genoa from Lombardy. Since the 1400s Piedmont became more and more culturally autonomous from the rest of Lombardy, and by the 1600s there was a substantial partition between Lombardy and Piedmont, the latter being ruled by the House of Savoy.

The ancient concept of Lombardy has kept surfacing in a few placenames until the modern era, e.g. Massa Lombarda (in Romagna) or Reggio di Lombardia (in Emilia, known as Reggio nell'Emilia since the unification of Italy).
