= Silk industry in Lyon =

Study of silk industry players in Lyon

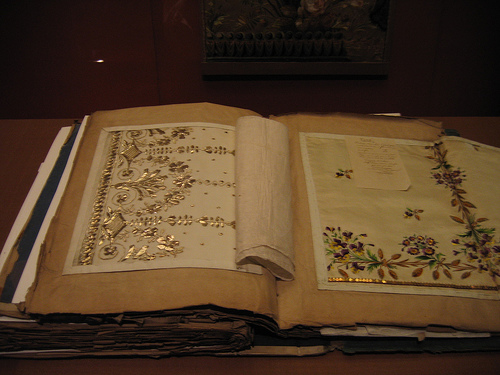
Catalog of silk patterns, Musée des Tissus de Lyon.

The history of silk production in Lyon involves the study of all the key players in the silk industry in Lyon. Over time, Lyon’s silk sector has encompassed every stage of producing and selling silk fabric from raw silk: spinning, creating patterns, weaving, finishing, and marketing. Collectively, this sector is referred to as the "Fabrique."

This history, spanning five centuries, originated on the banks of the Saône River during the Renaissance period. Fairs at this location facilitated the settlement of fabric merchants. The first weavers settled in Lyon under the auspices of a royal decree by King Francis I, and they rapidly prospered. However, this initial industrial momentum was interrupted by the Wars of Religion.

In the early 17th century, the invention of the drawloom enabled the Fabrique to master patterned fabrics. Its European expansion began during the reign of Louis XIV, as the fashions of the Versailles court set trends for all other European courts, propelling Lyon’s silk industry into prominence. During the 18th century, Lyon’s silk producers maintained their position through constant technical innovations, high-quality designers, and ongoing stylistic creativity.

The French Revolution dealt a severe blow to the Fabrique, but Napoleon strongly supported the sector, which peaked during the 19th century. Lyon became the global capital of silk, outpacing all other European silk industries and exporting a wide range of fabrics worldwide. Under the Second Empire, it was France’s most powerful export industry.

Although the first challenges arose in the 1880s, the advent of artificial textiles eventually ended Lyon’s industrial silk production in the 20th century. Traditional manufacturers struggled to adapt or did so too late. The silk industry collapsed in the 1930s, and despite numerous attempts at revival after World War II, the city’s activity became limited to haute couture and the restoration of antique fabrics.

== Silk before it arrived in Lyon ==
=== Chinese origins ===
The technique of producing silk thread from silkworm cocoons was discovered in China during the Shang dynasty (17th–11th century BCE). For a long time, silk production remained a Chinese monopoly, with the Roman Empire importing it at great expense until the 6th century CE. According to legend, monks sent by the Byzantine Emperor Justinian I smuggled silkworm eggs into Europe.

=== Introduction in Europe ===
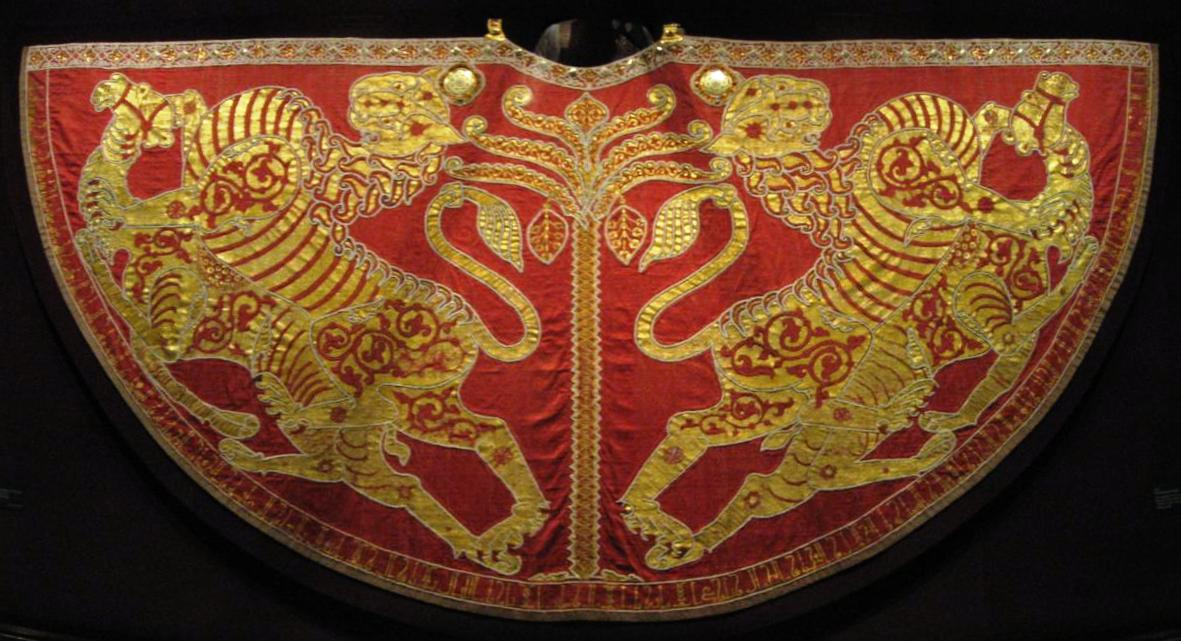
Coat of King Roger II of Sicily, preserved in the Hofburg treasury in Vienna (1133/1134).

Silk has been present in Europe since the 4th century, originating in the Byzantine world. The silk weaving technique was later transmitted to the Muslim civilization, where it flourished during the Middle Ages. Through this channel, silk weaving was introduced into the medieval Christian world. When Roger of Hauteville conquered Muslim Sicily in the latter half of the 11th century, he partially preserved its culture, giving rise to a unique civilization known as Norman Sicily. A notable artifact of this cultural transmission is the coronation mantle of Roger II, King of Sicily, made of embroidered silk. Until the 13th century, silk weaving in Christian Europe was confined to Sicily and Calabria, before spreading to Lucca, Venice, and other Italian cities. Another significant transmission route was Muslim Spain, gradually reconquered by Christians over several centuries. Despite this, the technical and artistic contributions of the Muslim world were significant, as evidenced by typical Spanish motifs reproduced in Italian cities.

== The Renaissance: the birth of the fabrique ==
Silk manufacturing in Lyon emerged during the Renaissance. Benefiting from a highly favorable environment created by trade fairs, significant freedom in organizing the craft, and the regular presence of monarchs, the silk industry grew rapidly. It reached its first golden age under the reign of Henry II before experiencing a severe crisis during the Wars of Religion. (Note: Gascon 1971, p. 390)

=== Initial attempts ===
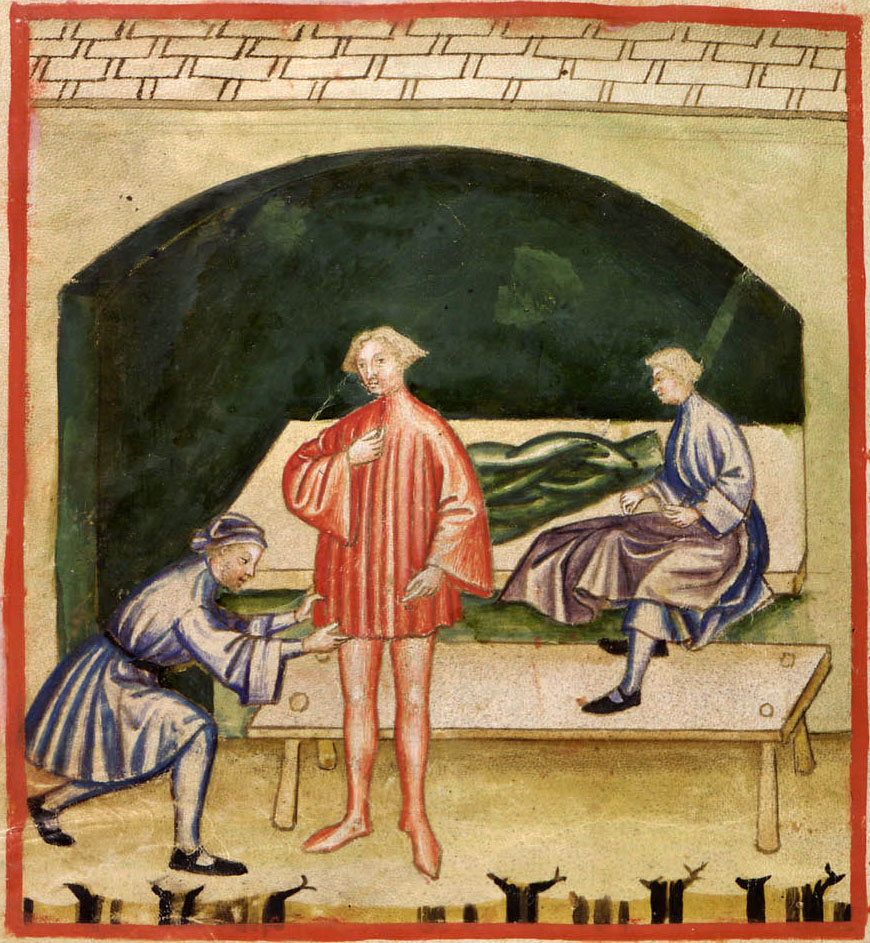
Cloth merchants from an illustration in a Tacuinum sanitatis manuscript.

During the 15th century, Lyon became a significant trading hub, with Charles VII granting the city the right to hold two tax-free fairs. These grew to three and then four annually by 1463, becoming key events in European Renaissance commerce. (Note: Pelletier et al. 2007, p. 265) Among other goods, many silks—primarily from Italy—were traded.

To curb the outflow of funds caused by the French elite’s insatiable demand for foreign silk, Louis XI sought to establish a silk manufacturing industry in Lyon. (Note: Gascon 1971, p. 308) By the ordinance of November 23, 1466, he urged Lyon’s bourgeoisie to finance workshops. However, the merchants hesitated, not wanting to disrupt their relationships with Italian trade partners. The few workers who settled in Lyon were later sent to Tours, to the Château de Plessis-lès-Tours, in 1470. (Note: Kleinclausz & Doucet 1939, p. 345)

This refusal by Lyonnais merchants can also be explained by economic conditions that seemed unfavorable for such an industry at the time. The local workforce was insufficient to enable low-cost production, and the profits from simply trading silk were comparatively certain and consistent. Italian silk merchants were essential to the success of the emerging fairs, and supporting the creation of an industry that would compete with their home cities risked driving them away. It was the transformation of these circumstances that, around fifty years later, allowed for the true establishment of Lyon's silk industry. (Note: Gascon 1971, p. 309)

In the meantime, a merchant from Lucca, Nicolas de Guide, attempted to weave silk in Lyon in 1514. However, he was violently opposed by his compatriots, who accused him of competing with his city. Lacking support from the consulate, he ultimately abandoned his efforts.

=== Turquet and Naris: the birth of Lyon’s silk industry ===
In 1536, Étienne Turquet and Barthélemy Naris, Piedmontese merchants established in Lyon, sought to create factories for the production of precious fabrics. Through royal letters patent, King Francis I granted them the same privileges as those in the city of Tours, thereby establishing the guild of workers in “cloths of gold, silver, and silk.” Turquet, Naris, and their workers were exempted from all taxes, guard duties, and militia service, on the condition that they worked within the city and not outside it. Turquet founded the “Fabrique Lyonnaise de Soierie” with the help of Lyonnais bourgeois such as the Senneton brothers and bankers like Camus, La Porte, and Faure. He also brought in workers from Avignon and Genoa.

=== The immediate rise of the silk industry ===
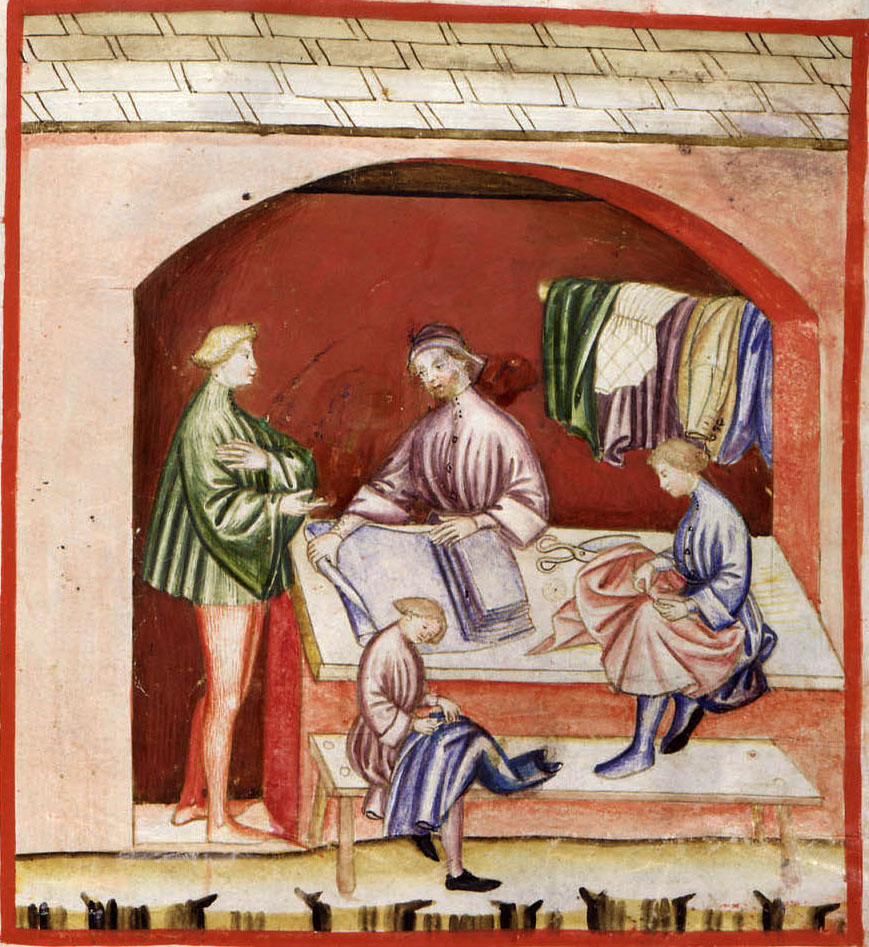
Silk merchants, from an illustration in a manuscript of the Tacuinum sanitatis.

Supported by the king, who granted Lyon a monopoly on importing raw silk in 1540, the silk industry quickly flourished. By 1548, during the procession marking the entrance of King Henry II, 459 master craftsmen participated, and between 800 and 1,000 people made a living from silk production in Lyon. (Note: Pelletier et al. 2007, p. 270) This rapid growth was due in part to favorable economic conditions, an abundant supply of labor, and a flexible regulatory framework. At the time, Lyon was a particularly free city where artisans were not constrained by restrictive guilds, a liberty safeguarded by royal letters patent from 1486 and 1511. (Note: Kleinclausz & Doucet 1939, p. 503) The initial company established by Turquet and Naris dissolved in 1540, with each continuing independently. New master silk weavers emerged, including Gibert de Crémone (who also operated in Saint-Chamond), Leydeul, and Rollet Viard, who owned looms in Avignon as well. (Note: Kleinclausz & Doucet 1939, p. 505)

The rapid expansion of activity necessitated the creation of the first regulations for organizing the industry and the guild by 1554. These rules were drafted by the master craftsmen and the notable members of the consulate and were later formalized by the king. (Note: Kleinclausz & Doucet 1939, p. 505) According to Roger Doucet, the apex of this initial period of Lyon’s silk industry occurred during the reign of Henry II. (Note: Kleinclausz & Doucet 1939, p. 506) However, accurately measuring the production growth is challenging. Records provided by the consulate are often exaggerated and combine silk and wool workers into a single category. Despite these difficulties, the new industry successfully competed against imported Italian silks by offering lower prices on entry-level fabrics. (Note: Gascon 1971, p. 620) Historian Richard Gascon estimated production growth based on the entry of bales of unprocessed or semi-processed silk intended for fabric production: from 1522 to 1544, the volume may have increased 2.5 times, and by eightfold between 1544 and 1569.

This success should not obscure the fact that, during this period, the Fabrique was only capable of producing plain fabrics, which did not rival the high-end creations of Italian cities. Despite some simple patterns achieved using ties or rods by Lyonnais artisans, Italian craftsmen remained the unrivaled masters of patterned silk production. It was not until the 1600s, with technical advancements brought by Claude Dangon (Note: Pelletier et al. 2007, p. 482)—likely imported from Italy—that Lyon began to compete in this domain.

=== The Religious wars crisis ===
Charles IX, King of France, who precipitated the Lyon silk crisis, painting by François Clouet, Vienna Museum of Art History.

The occupation of Lyon by Protestant forces in 1562 and 1563 triggered a crisis that could have been temporary but, combined with other negative events, plunged Lyon’s silk industry into its first cyclical depression.

With Protestants seizing power in Lyon in 1562, many leading merchants—who were also major manufacturers—left the city. This sudden departure led to a shortage of raw materials for the workshops, while the commercial networks for selling their production were severely disrupted. The plague that followed in subsequent years exacerbated the depression. In their petitions to the king, the remaining master silk weavers claimed that two-thirds of the workers had disappeared.

Adding to these temporary catastrophes was an event that further weakened Lyon’s silk industry, which now faced fierce competition. In 1563, Charles IX, then just 13 years old and newly crowned in a kingdom ravaged by religious divisions, imposed a 50% tax on raw silk imports. This significantly reduced the competitiveness of Lyon’s weavers, as foreign products—often smuggled into France—became cheaper than local goods. At the same time, rival cities such as Geneva, Besançon, Turin, Milan, Modena, and Reggio began producing low-quality plain and striped fabrics at low prices. These cities attracted part of Lyon’s workforce, which was suffering from a lack of employment opportunities. (Note: Gascon 1971, p. 621)

The decline in workforce numbers and production levels is difficult to quantify. Historian Richard Gascon estimates that the number of looms in Lyon dropped from about 3,000 in the late 1550s to roughly 200 in the 1570s. (Note: Gascon 1971, p. 622)

At the end of the 16th century, King Henry IV, seeking to make France self-sufficient in silk thread production, encouraged the cultivation of silkworms. Supported by Olivier de Serres, who briefly planted mulberry trees in the gardens of the Tuileries, Henry IV promoted this development, particularly in the Cévennes and Ardèche regions, where the climate was favorable. Mulberry cultivation had already been initiated in Languedoc and Provence in 1564 by François Traucat, leading to the establishment of France’s first silkworm farms.

== 17th and 18th centuries: Lyon’s silk at the Royal Court ==
During the 17th and 18th centuries, Lyon’s silk industry was closely tied to the royal court and, to a lesser extent, to the conflicts affecting European monarchies. This dependence explains the alternating periods of prosperity and hardship that marked the silk workers’ lives and the trade as a whole.

=== From Henry IV to Louis XIV ===
At the beginning of the 17th century, the Fabrique in Lyon consisted of fewer than 1,000 master weavers, operating fewer than 2,000 looms and employing fewer than 3,000 people in total. Under Henry IV, Lyon's silk industry underwent two significant developments.

The first was the introduction of the drawloom (métier à la grande tire) by Claude Dangon, imported from Italy, which enabled the weaving of patterned fabrics. This innovation allowed Lyon to compete with Paris and Tours and match the quality of the productions from Italian cities. At the time, northern and central Italian cities dominated European silk production in both quality and quantity, setting the styles sought after by elites across the continent. (Note: Gaulin et al. 2009, p. 193) The quality of Lyonnais silk further improved in 1655 with the introduction of silk polishing, brought to the city by Octavio Mey.

The second major development was the establishment of regulations governing the profession. Until then, master weavers were free to organize their work as they saw fit. In 1596, apprenticeships were set at five years, followed by a two-year period as a journeyman. Masters were allowed no more than two apprentices and were prohibited from employing people outside their families for auxiliary tasks such as preparing warps and wefts. (Note: Tassinari 2005, p. 183)

Despite these advancements, Lyon remained a minor silk center compared to Italian cities until the mid-17th century. The trade-in luxury fabrics was still dominated by Italian merchants. (Note: Gaulin et al. 2009, p. 199)

==== Colbert's reforms ====
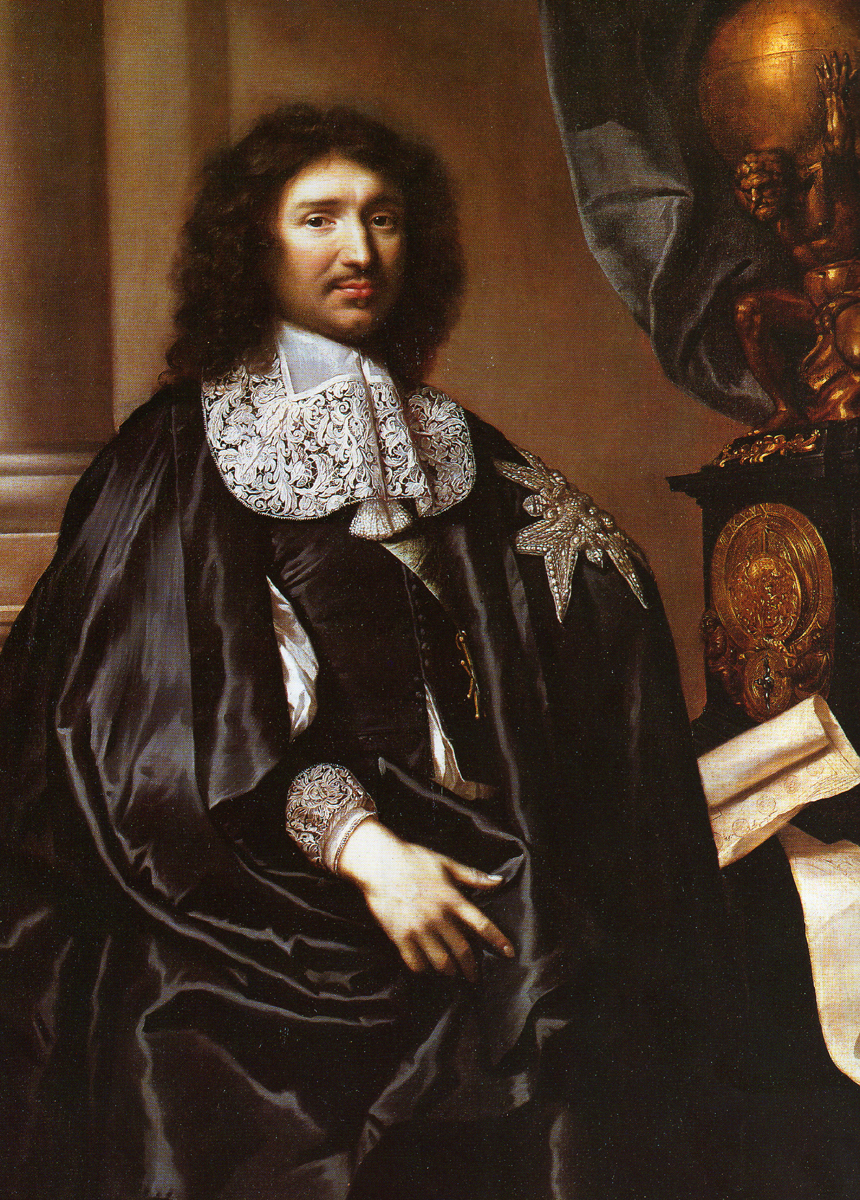
Portrait of Colbert by Claude Lefèbvre, preserved at the Château de Versailles.

In 1667, Jean-Baptiste Colbert issued several ordinances to regulate the "Grande Fabrique de Soie" in Lyon. These decrees established strict guidelines for production, detailing the quality standards for royal orders and specifying factors such as fabric width and the number of threads to be used. They also mandated the maintenance of production logs. Extravagant fabrics were produced in Lyon for members of the royal court and to furnish royal residences such as the Château de Saint-Germain-en-Laye and the Palace of Versailles. For example, the "brocade of love" in six pieces adorned the king’s chamber in 1673. Unfortunately, no pieces from this era survive, as worn fabrics were melted down to recover precious metals.

Colbert's mercantilist policies strongly supported the growth of French industrial production. His efforts were particularly effective for the Fabrique, as the number of weavers tripled between 1665 and 1690. To avoid alienating a clientele still attached to traditional Italian styles, French merchant-manufacturers refrained from innovating with motifs. In some cases, they even marketed their fabrics as Italian to reassure customers. (Note: Gaulin et al. 2009, p. 200) The industry’s growth was not significantly disrupted by the revocation of the Edict of Nantes (1685), although many Protestant silk workers emigrated, taking refuge in places like Zurich and London (notably in the Spitalfields area).

==== Commercial and stylistic evolution ====
From the late 17th century to the 1720s, royal commissions ceased entirely. The final years of Louis XIV's reign were challenging for the Lyonnais silk industry, as royal mourning periods reduced the demand for luxury fabrics.

Since Lyon's industry was entirely devoted to the French aristocratic market, it was forced to seek new outlets by appealing to less affluent customers who demanded simpler fabrics. However, this modest clientele could not fully compensate for the loss of orders from Versailles. It was during this period that a new commercial strategy began to emerge, which would prove successful in the 18th century. Leveraging the fact that Louis XIV's court was the most dazzling in Europe and that elite fashion trends were influenced by Versailles and Paris, Lyon's merchants began exporting annual novelties that became popular among foreign elites. A report submitted to the London Parliament in 1713 noted that English silk manufacturers had to adhere to French fashion trends to succeed domestically. However, the delays they faced in copying and distributing their designs to markets condemned them to less profitable sales in the high-end fabric segment. Nonetheless, English silk producers remained dominant in their domestic market. (Note: Poni 1998, p. 593)

To satisfy the constant demand for novelty, merchant-manufacturers began creating fabrics with original patterns, seeking to move away from traditional designs. This ongoing stylistic innovation, aided by the proximity of merchant-manufacturers to the courts of Paris and Versailles, gradually allowed Lyon to outcompete foreign textiles from Italy, England, and the Netherlands. However, commercial results remained mixed until the 1730s.

=== Under Louis XV and Louis XVI ===
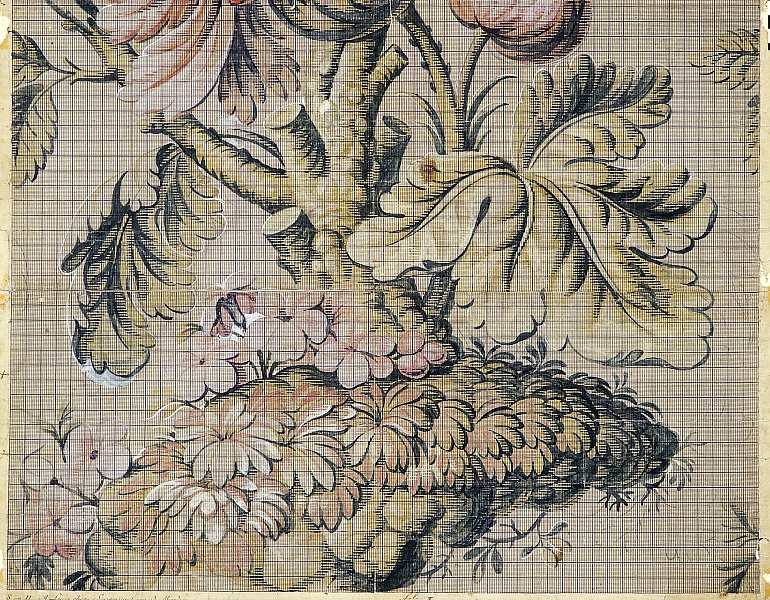
Mise en carte by Jean Revel (1733)

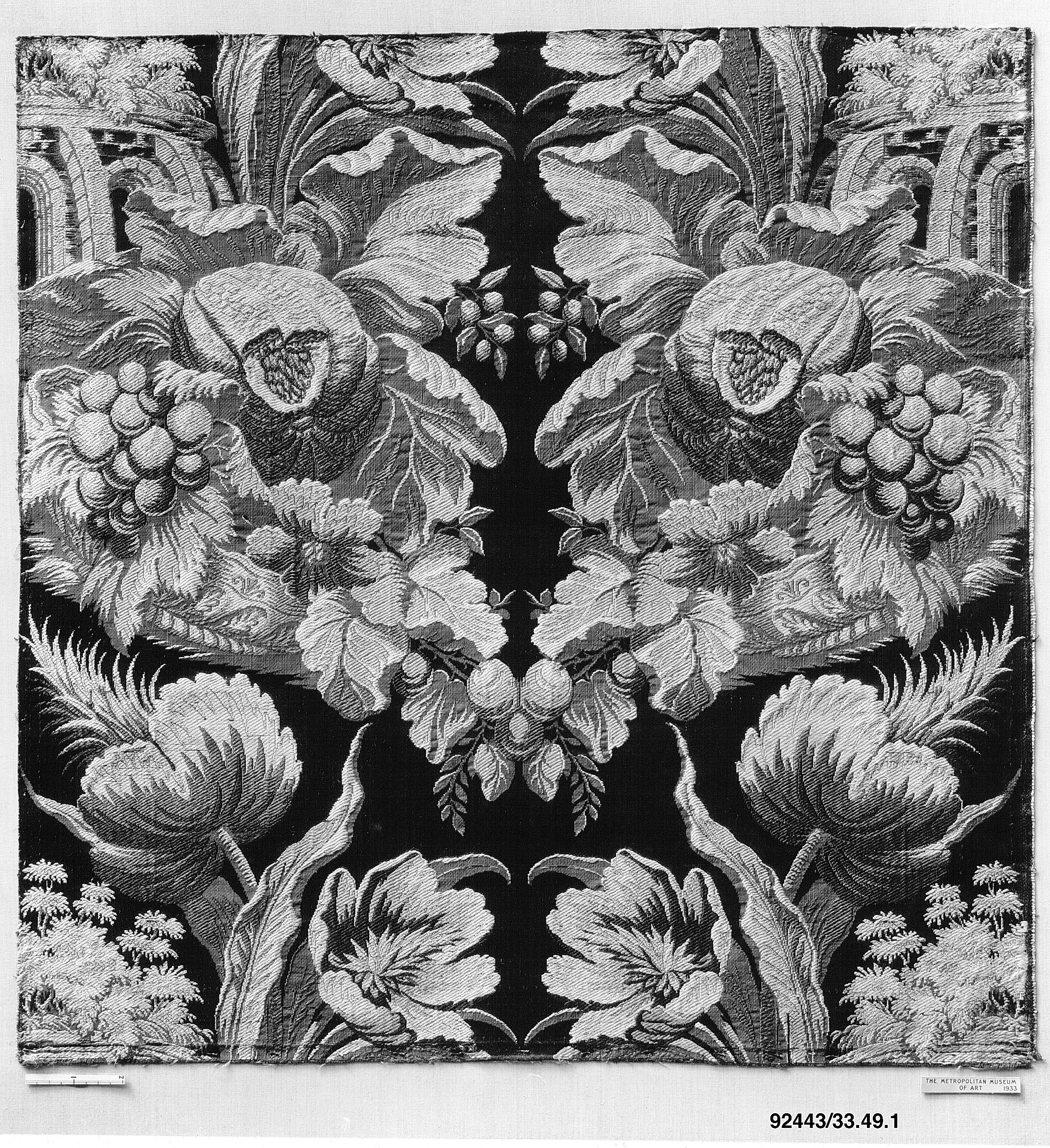
Fragment of a fabric designed by Jean Revel

Building on favorable developments under Louis XIV, the Grande Fabrique thrived during the Age of Enlightenment, dominating the European silk trade and earning a reputation abroad as the "undisputed capital of silk." Numerous innovations in weaving technology emerged during this period, aimed at improving productivity and the quality of the final fabric.

After two centuries of following foreign, especially Italian, trends, Lyonnais silk producers fully emancipated themselves in the 18th century, engaging in a relentless pursuit of innovation and constant renewal. By this time, Paris had become the European center of fashion, and all major Lyonnais manufacturers had representatives there to stay up-to-date with court trends. These representatives worked closely with designers who spearheaded artistic developments. Two key figures in this creative endeavor were Jean Revel and Philippe de la Salle. The Fabrique gained such prestige that other European production centers began adopting Lyonnais styles.

During the 18th century, the majority of Lyon’s silk production was exported to Southern and Central Europe. Through Spain, their products even reached South America. Lyonnais silks were also highly sought after in Nordic countries, particularly Sweden. However, Lyon’s merchants faced stiff competition from other producers, including Italy and Great Britain. Britain, in particular, held a firm grip on its domestic market and North America.

==== Organization of the fabrique ====
The Fabrique was institutionally dominated by large merchants, who consistently received royal support. Throughout the 18th century, the governing bodies of the Fabrique implemented systems to foster innovation, enabling the entire sector to benefit from numerous inventions.

==== Struggles for influence over the fabrique ====
As in previous centuries, the Fabrique was plagued by conflicts between the elite silk merchants, who controlled the sales channels for their benefit, and master weavers and workers, who were largely barred from direct sales. The latter persistently sought greater inclusion in the silk trade, whether through institutional roles or guaranteed wages with standardized rates.

Tensions began to escalate in the 18th century with the consular ordinance of June 4, 1718, which imposed high entry fees to prevent master weavers from advancing to the merchant class. Following a royal commission in 1730, the Comptroller General of Finances, Philibert Orry, issued a new regulation on October 8, 1731, which strongly favored the major merchants. At this time, the Fabrique consisted of 120 to 180 large merchants, around 700 small merchants, and approximately 8,000 master-workers. The struggle for influence continued, culminating in the 1737 proclamation of a new regulation allowing small merchants and workers to form associations and sell directly without requiring the mediation of a major silk merchant. This regulation was suspended in 1739 and replaced in 1744 by a new set of rules re-establishing the dominance of the commercial elite. Its announcement in August 1744 provoked riots led by master workers. The king’s local forces were overwhelmed, and the government temporarily suspended the new regulation to restore order. However, the following year, the situation was forcibly resolved, and the 1744 regulation was permanently enforced.

==== Social structure ====
In the 18th century, the Fabrique consisted of four overlapping but distinct social groups.

The elite comprised merchants who controlled the wholesale trade of raw silk, reselling the material to merchant-manufacturers. These families, numbering only a few dozen, also invested in spinning, woven silk resale, and banking. These merchants were often connected to Italian families from Turin or Milan.

A second group consists of around one hundred merchant-manufacturers, also known as "silk producers" (soyeux), who provide silk for weaving to master-workers, employ designers, and resell the ordered fabrics. About thirty of them are large-scale operators who interact with the group of international merchants, though they differ in that they lack control over the upstream commercial circuits. This class is further divided into two groups: the "large merchants," who sell in an actual store and employ many workers outside their workshops, and the "small merchants," who produce and sell on their own account, typically operating with an average of four looms in their homes.

The third group consists of the master-workers, who own one or more weaving looms. They receive threads and designs from the merchant-manufacturers and may, in turn, employ apprentices or helpers. This group struggles with the state of subjugation imposed by regulations, as well as the lack of guarantees regarding the compensation for their work, the "tariff." They organize themselves clandestinely, since any association of bodies is prohibited, and protest, sometimes violently, as in 1744.

Finally, the last group is made up of the countless helpers, apprentices, and workers who do not own their own production tools.

==== Technical improvements ====
During the 18th century, many innovations were applied to the weaving loom to facilitate work, leading to new types of weaving. These innovations were driven by a commercial logic and were promoted by the trade sector. The merchant-manufacturers implemented "a public management of innovation, based on the shared negotiation of technical utility and the rapid dissemination of new techniques through financial, municipal, and community investment. In this sense, the corporation, far from being backward-looking, actually promotes technical innovation."

At the start of the century, systems to facilitate the reading of designs and the selection of threads for the shuttle passage were developed. These included the Basile Bouchon loom, introduced in 1725. A colleague of Bouchon, Jean-Baptiste Falcon, invented the punched-card system carried by a prism, which allowed complex patterns to be spread much more quickly from one workshop to another. This period also saw an early attempt at mechanizing weaving looms, led by Jacques Vaucanson in the 1740s. However, this attempt was rejected by the workers of the Fabrique and was short-lived. These innovations, not always technically perfected, were not always adopted but were part of the ongoing improvement of loom performance.

==== Public system of innovation support ====
Local authorities were well aware that innovation was the key to their commercial success. Support for inventors became institutionalized through two forms of financial reward. The first came directly from the Fabrique corporation, which provided, for example, 52,194 livres to Jean-Baptiste Falcon between 1738 and 1755 for his work on perfecting the loom. The second was managed by the municipality and the intendant, funded by the fabric duty on foreign textiles, created in 1711. Starting in 1725, a portion of the revenue from this fund was granted to inventors, with this proportion increasing after the 1750s. These provisions were complemented by a diffusion bonus, rewarding those who adapted a new system to a large number of looms.

Over the century, the methods for validating funding requests became more sophisticated and relied on cross-expertise from academics and professionals. This cooperation between various trades marked a deep trend in Lyon's culture, which sought consensus and arbitration. It led, in the early 19th century, to the establishment of the industrial tribunal.

During the 18th century, Lyonnais submitted 229 patent applications to the royal administration concerning textiles, 116 of which were solely aimed at improving the loom. Most of these applications came from weavers seeking to improve the long and delicate operations involved in creating patterns. Of the 170 inventors who petitioned the authorities to validate a technique, only 12 were large merchants. Designers were also inventors, combining stylistic research with technical research to develop new fabrics. For example, Jean Revel created the "retired" or "berclé" weave in the 1730s, which allowed the creation of half-tones. The resulting relief in the fabric and the color nuances were unknown at that time. This innovation was immediately adopted and imitated in Great Britain. (Note: Rothstein 1990, p. 188)

Lyon's elites thus multiplied their support for innovation and the dissemination of techniques, both in a spirit of respect for corporatist solidarities and in rewarding individual innovative practices. "In Lyon, inventions are a benefit to the city's and kingdom's economy before they become an asset in the hands of their creator." Exclusive privileges are therefore very rare in Lyon and rarely concern the world of silk.

==== Prosperity and definition of a French style: 1700-1750 ====
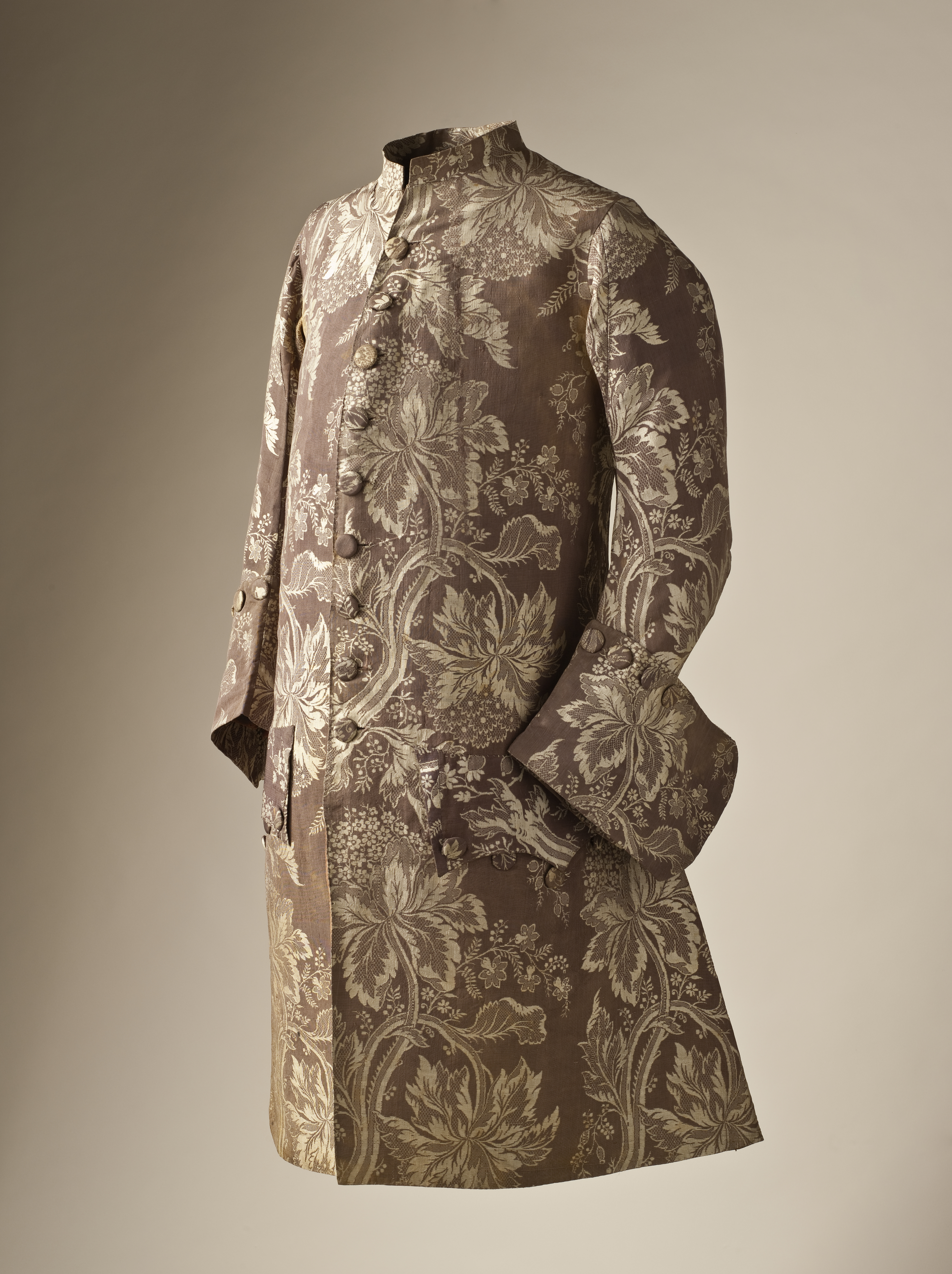
Embroidered silk jacket, 1745-1750, in the Los Angeles County Museum of Art.

During the Regency of Philippe d'Orléans, the Grand Fabrique experienced some instability as many orders came from individuals enriched by the Law system, whose ruin prevented the final payment. Additionally, the rise of the East India Company, which introduced new textiles to the French market, severely competed with Lyon silk.

The peace at the start of Louis XV’s actual reign, along with many happy events in the royal family, including the birth of the Dauphin, led to a surge in orders for Lyon silk. This resulted in a period of prosperity for the Fabrique. The petitions from Lyon merchants, supported by the consulate, led to a major royal order for upholstery silk in 1730 for the Palace of Versailles. This order finally stabilized Lyon’s silk industry and allowed for strong growth until the 1750s. Activity doubled between 1720 and 1760. One of the leading silk houses of this period was the Charton family, which supplied the largest share of royal furnishings between 1741 and 1782.

==== Lyonnais designers ====
This period also saw the emancipation of Lyonnais designers from the Italian style, allowing them to establish their trademark. This style quickly spread throughout Europe and helped boost the sales of Lyon silk among the elites across the continent. Designers trained in the presence of Lyonnais painters such as Charles Grandon, Daniel Sarrabat (who had Philippe de la Salle as a student), or Donat Nonnotte. Uniquely in Europe, they often had stakes in silk businesses, thus acting as both patrons and employed designers. Likewise, they did not form an organized group and, unlike merchants or weavers, they did not have their own corporation. Thus, the design does not belong to the one who executes it, but to the silk house that commissioned it. (Note: Charpigny 1993, p. 121)

To find inspiration, after many years of study, they "frequented the engraving cabinets, art collections, the Gobelins workshops, theaters, the aristocracy's palaces, and the court." (Note: Gaulin et al. 2009, p. 201) However, they were also fabric technicians, mechanics, and merchants, as a design is created based on its commercial impact, its feasibility, and the final quality of the fabric it adorns.

Among the designers of this period, Courtois made the first attempts at color degradation by juxtaposing threads in different shades, from light to dark. Ringuet was one of the first to attempt to imitate nature in floral designs. One of the great innovators of this period was Jean Revel, whose invention of the "berclé" weave, allowing for the blending of colors, had immediate success. (Note: Charpigny 1993, p. 122)

==== The French style ====
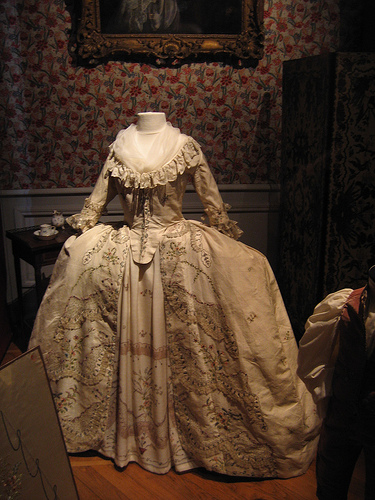
Eighteenth-century silk dress. Musée des Tissus de Lyon.

The emergence of the first forms of a distinctly French style dates back to the glory years of Louis XIV and Colbert’s desire to create a powerful national industry. Competing with Italian and Spanish fashions, it first established itself at the French court and then slowly spread to all European courts. This style thus became, de facto, European.

At its beginnings, it was characterized by the appearance of asymmetry and sharper designs. Floral decoration was the preferred subject, repeated ad nauseam, but with constant renewal. "The motif is no longer stylized but is the result of the naturalistic reproduction of reality, studied directly or observed in botanical treatises." (Note: Gaulin et al. 2009, p. 202) In the 1700s to 1710s, the so-called "Bizarre" style spread, offering an exuberant and fanciful treatment of naturalistic motifs. In long designs, there was a mix of familiar and unusual themes, chinoiseries and japoniseries, and motifs with seemingly incompatible proportions. (Note: Rothstein 1990, p. 180)

The 1720s to 1740s marked the Regency style, characterized by "decorations where flowers, plants, and fruits in nuanced and brilliant colors bloom generously amid architectural motifs, ruins, vases, baskets, shells, and rocks." At the beginning of Louis XV’s reign, "lace" motifs appeared. Semi-naturalistic floral designs, sometimes with fruits and leaves, were interwoven with lace imitations. (Note: Rothstein 1990, pp. 184–185)

Finally, the 1730s to 1740s were marked by a taste for a more classic and realistic depiction of nature, though the 1740s also marked the Rococo period. It was also at this time that the first attempts at depicting relief on fabric were made, following Jean Revel's invention. To highlight this novelty, motifs were enlarged to large proportions, such as "giving a rose the size of a cabbage and an olive the size of a pumpkin." (Note: Rothstein 1990, p. 189)

The French style was not only characterized by innovations in designs but also in fabric, with the invention of new weaving processes.

==== The influence of the French style and the commercial success of the fabrique ====
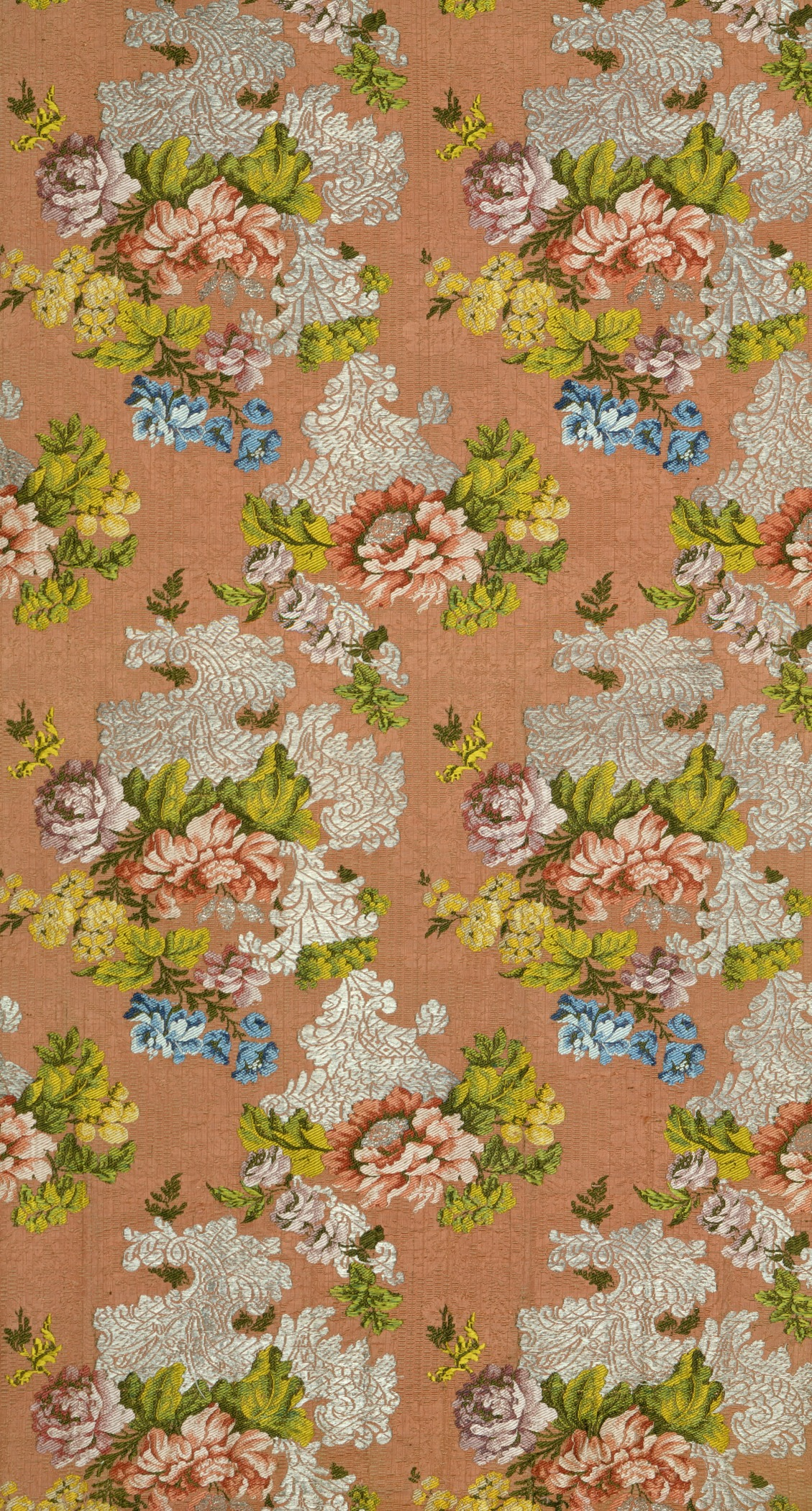
Made circa 1730-1740, in the Los Angeles County Museum of Art.

The French style, following the prestige it gained under Louis XIV, gained an even greater place under Louis XV in all the luxury markets of Europe. In Britain, Holland, and Italy, the silk centers of the continent were forced to copy, albeit belatedly, French fabrics. Despite the very high reputation of Dutch weavers in the early 18th century, and laws prohibiting the entry of French silks into Italy, the Lyonnais managed to dominate all markets on the continent. (Note: Poni 1998, p. 596)

These merchants adopted an aggressive commercial policy. After offering the new fashion of the year and making substantial profits, and before local silk workers could produce fabrics imitating their designs, they drastically reduced the prices of their leftover stock to break the market and prevent imitators from making large profits off their work. This, of course, was just before the arrival of the new fashion, which rendered all unsold goods obsolete and even harder to sell. (Note: Poni 1998, p. 595)

This outward-facing commercial policy was supported by several royal decisions to protect the French industry. In 1711, the monarchy introduced a tax on the importation of raw silks, with collection taking place in Lyon through the establishment of a "foreign fabric tax fund." Lyon silk workers protested, arguing that their silk became less competitive than foreign fabrics. The state modified the law in 1716, significantly increasing duties on the import of foreign fabrics, which were also collected through the same fund. This protectionist stance softened in 1720 but continued thereafter. (Note: Hilaire-Pérez 2000, p. 345)

==== Crises and difficulties: 1750-1770 ====
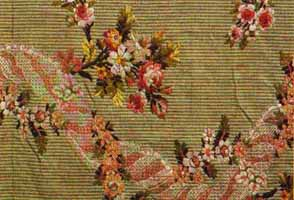
Lyon silk brocade (1760-1770).

Between 1750 and 1770, several crises severely affected the silk trade in the Rhone Valley. These difficult periods began with the War of the Austrian Succession (1740-1748) and the Seven Years' War (1756-1763). They were exacerbated by numerous deaths at court and conflicts in the northern countries, major silk importers. The crisis peaked in 1771 with the conflict between the Russian Empire, Poland, and the Ottoman Empire, also important clients of French merchants.

In 1756, the Abbé de Lacroix-Laval and a group of art enthusiasts founded a Fine Arts school. It became, in 1780, "the Royal Academic School of Drawing for the Progress of the Arts and the Manufactures of the City of Lyon," offering free courses. It trained many designers in classical painting and the reproduction of natural flowers in all their nuances. However, these designers sought to evolve and propose innovations to their patrons and clients. "Between 1750 and 1770, flower and plant garlands, branches, ribbons, and passementerie cordelières... flow vertically through fabrics in undulating movements, meanders, or 'rivers' in the Rococo style." The technique of design for weaving was first theorized by Joubert de l'Hiberderie in his "Manual for Designers for Fabric Manufacturing" in 1765.

The most iconic designer of this period is Philippe de la Salle, considered in the 1760s to be the best in his profession. (Note: Rothstein 1990, p. 203) He, along with many others, also worked on the technical improvement of looms, particularly lightening the work of the lacemaker. He perfected the shuttles, other loom parts, and invented the removable semple. Supported as a designer, educator, and inventor by the Fabrique and the city of Lyon, he received 122,000 livres from them for his work. His fame was so great that he was invited to demonstrate weaving at the Tuileries in front of Louis XVI, who ennobled him in 1775.

==== Revival before the revolutionary turmoil: 1770-1790 ====
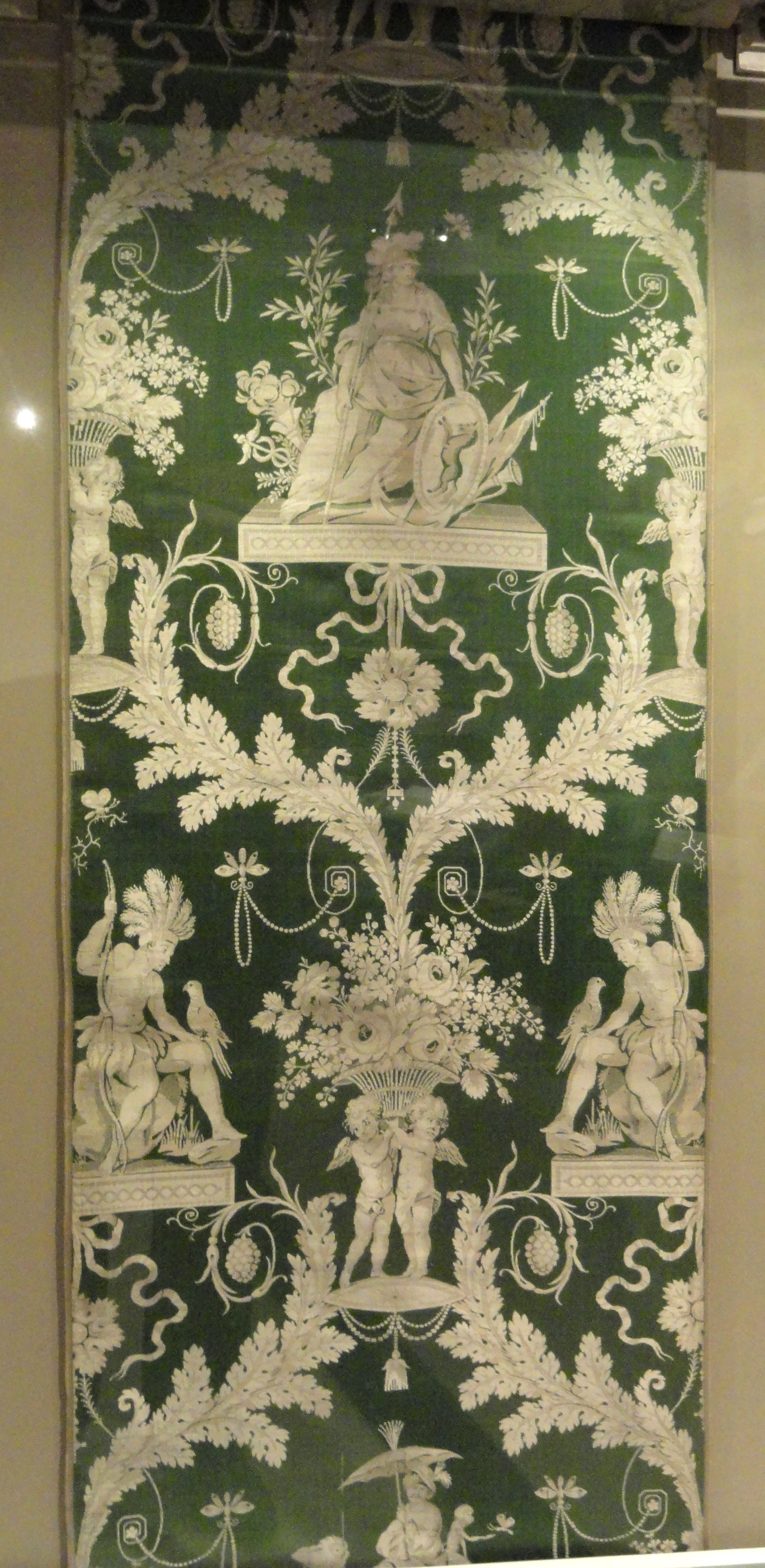
Neoclassical brocade woven in Lyon in 1785 on the theme “The Four Parts of the World”. In the Royal Ontario Museum.

A revival began at the start of Louis XVI's reign, especially in the 1780s, partly due to Thierry de Ville d'Avray, the administrator of the royal furniture. Convinced of the excellence of Lyon's artisans, he placed a series of orders between 1785 and 1789, which revived the city's activity. These orders were for the royal apartments at Versailles, Rambouillet, Saint-Cloud, and Compiègne.

To adapt to changing tastes, the Fabrique turned to embroidery, developing a large sector of embroiderers on silk. Merchant-manufacturers also experimented with fashionable techniques, such as mixing other fibers with silk, moiré Gros de Tours, or droguet, in which the warp played an equal role with the weft in creating the design.

The Fabrique continued its traditional production of large-patterned fabrics. The Louis XVI style, in the neoclassical movement that dominated the period, was reflected in Lyon silk with "pastoral compositions dotted with medallions and ribbon knots, in Trianon style, while mythological scenes or allegories, imitating bas-reliefs or antique cameos, formed elegant decorations punctuated by arabesques, garlands of pearls, vases, putti, and other ornaments in the taste of Greco-Roman antiquity." There were also droguets, dots, and stripes. The motifs became smaller, often no larger than two to three centimeters, and were arranged vertically. Camille Pernon and Jean-Démosthène Dugourc were important representatives of this style.

To satisfy their clientele, the silk workers continually refreshed their designs instead of seeking to develop simple, solid-colored silks. The houses employed designers, regularly sending them to Paris to stay informed of the latest fashions and to offer clients always-new decorations. Regulations attempted to protect these designs, and requests to the highest authorities led to the implementation of copyright laws. In 1787, a royal decree guaranteed designers exclusive rights to their work for periods ranging from six to twenty-five years. Among notable designers, sometimes designer-manufacturers, were Jacques-Charles Dutillieu, Joseph Bournes, François Grognard, and Pierre Toussaint Dechazelle.

By the end of the 18th century, the reputation of Lyon silk workers allowed them to secure important orders from European courts, including those of Catherine II of Russia and Charles IV of Spain. Camille Pernon was introduced to the Russian court by Voltaire and became the empress's agent between 1783 and 1792.

With cycles of prosperity and difficult years, the idea of a minimum rate for weaving emerged and became a strong demand. In 1786, the Revolt of the Two Sous, which saw merchants and weavers confront one another again, was severely repressed. The authorities then reiterated the absolute power of the consulate in regulating trade between major merchants and workers, the consulate itself being largely in the hands of the merchants. The royal power prohibited price increases and any workers' organization. This revolt, in its structure, foreshadowed the great workers' revolts of the 19th century. (Note: Pelletier et al. 2007, p. 621)

At the dawn of the Revolution, Lyon had 14,000 looms, employing over 30,000 weavers and 30,000 workers for related activities, for a total population of around 150,000 inhabitants.

== The revolutionary crisis ==
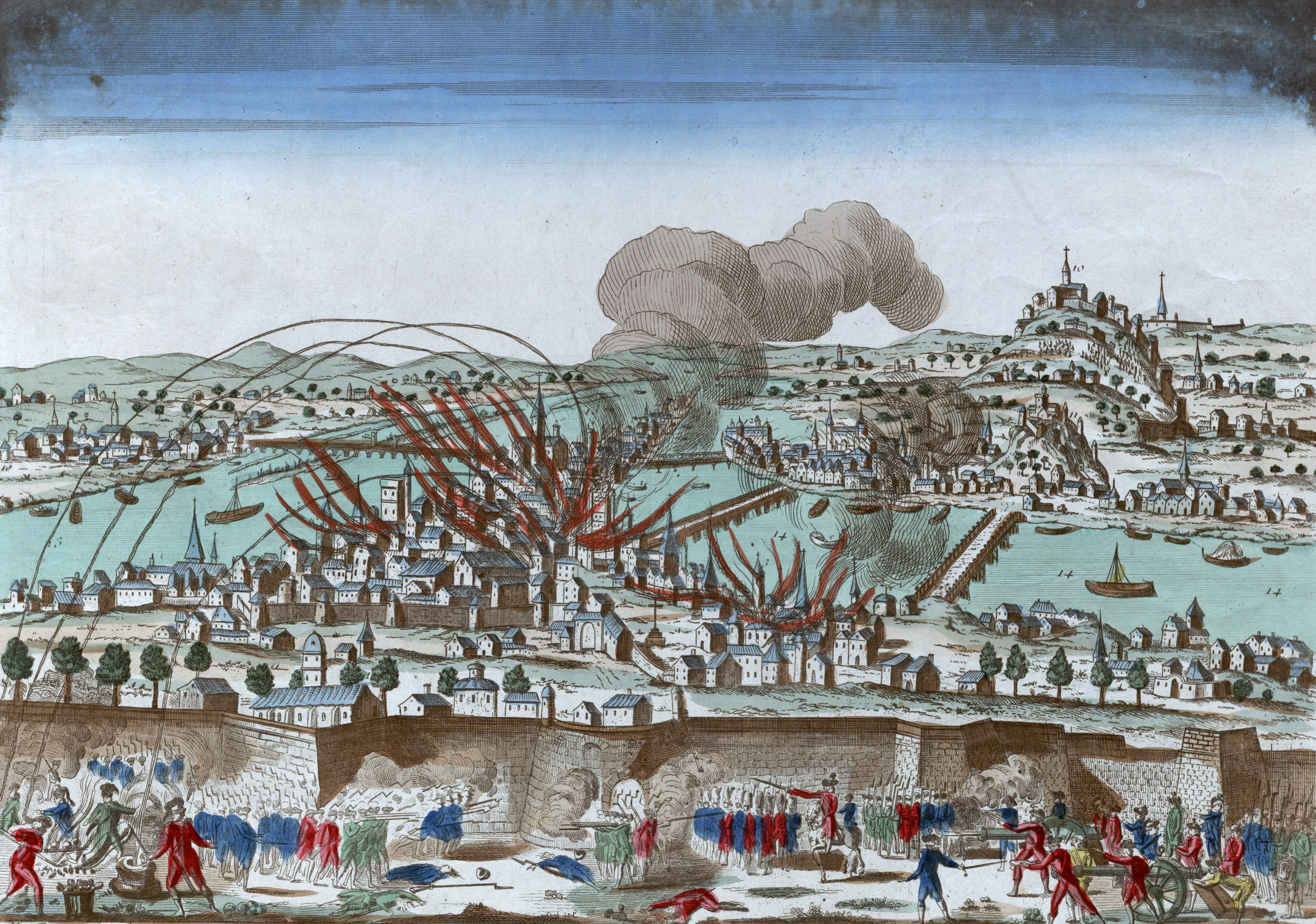
The bombardment of Lyon during the siege of 1793.

Lyon entered the revolutionary period in crisis. The years 1787-1788 were difficult for the silk industry, with production being halved overall.

In 1789, during the preparation for the Estates-General, the vote of the deputies revealed an irreparable rift between the weavers and the merchants. No representative of the merchants was elected, and only those from the master workers attended the Estates-General. In the grievances books, they expressed their desire for a fairer organization, holding the master merchants responsible for their misery.

The weavers obtained an official rate in November 1789 and decided to separate from the merchants by creating a distinct community at the Cathedral of Saint-Jean on May 3, 1790. They also placed great hopes in the law of June 16, 1791, which abolished corporations and their privileges. Meanwhile, the authorities attempted to protect French silks by establishing customs duties.

However, with the exodus of part of the nobility, the Fabrique automatically lost a significant portion of its clientele. The crisis set in with inflation and war, hindering trade. Expensive woven fabrics were replaced by simpler, plain fabrics decorated with embroidery. The siege of Lyon in 1793 caused a terrible exodus, severely limiting production capabilities. The population of Lyon, about 150,000, dropped to 102,000 in 1794, and then 88,000 in 1800. The ensuing repression led to the death of 115 of the 400 silk entrepreneurs in the city. Many merchant-manufacturers also emigrated, fleeing the fighting and political persecution. In 1793, the Royal School of Fine Arts was abolished.

Between 1794 and 1799, the world of merchant-manufacturers gradually reconstituted itself thanks to the arrival of houses operating in other French cities. As early as 1794, the silk manufacturers Laguelline, Ourson, and Benoit arrived from Nîmes and Anduze. By the end of the same year, Guérin settled in Lyon, coming from Saint-Chamond.

During these difficult years, to cope with the lack of labor, technical innovations were supported by the state through competitions and the establishment of schools. In particular, the drawing school was recreated in 1795 under the name "École de dessin de la fleur." The Lyon silk manufacturers sought ideas from English engineers in the cotton fabric production sector. This effort to mechanize the production tool led to the development of the Jacquard machine at the beginning of the 19th century.

== From the First Empire to the Third Republic: the peak of Lyon silk industry ==
The 19th century marks the peak of Lyon silk production. The production, diversity, and commercial expansion of this sector reached unprecedented levels. After the Napoleonic revival, the city thrived entirely on its weaving and trade, driving other industrial sectors and the banking sector. Silk brought global fame to the city, particularly through the Universal Expositions.

=== The revival under Napoleon ===
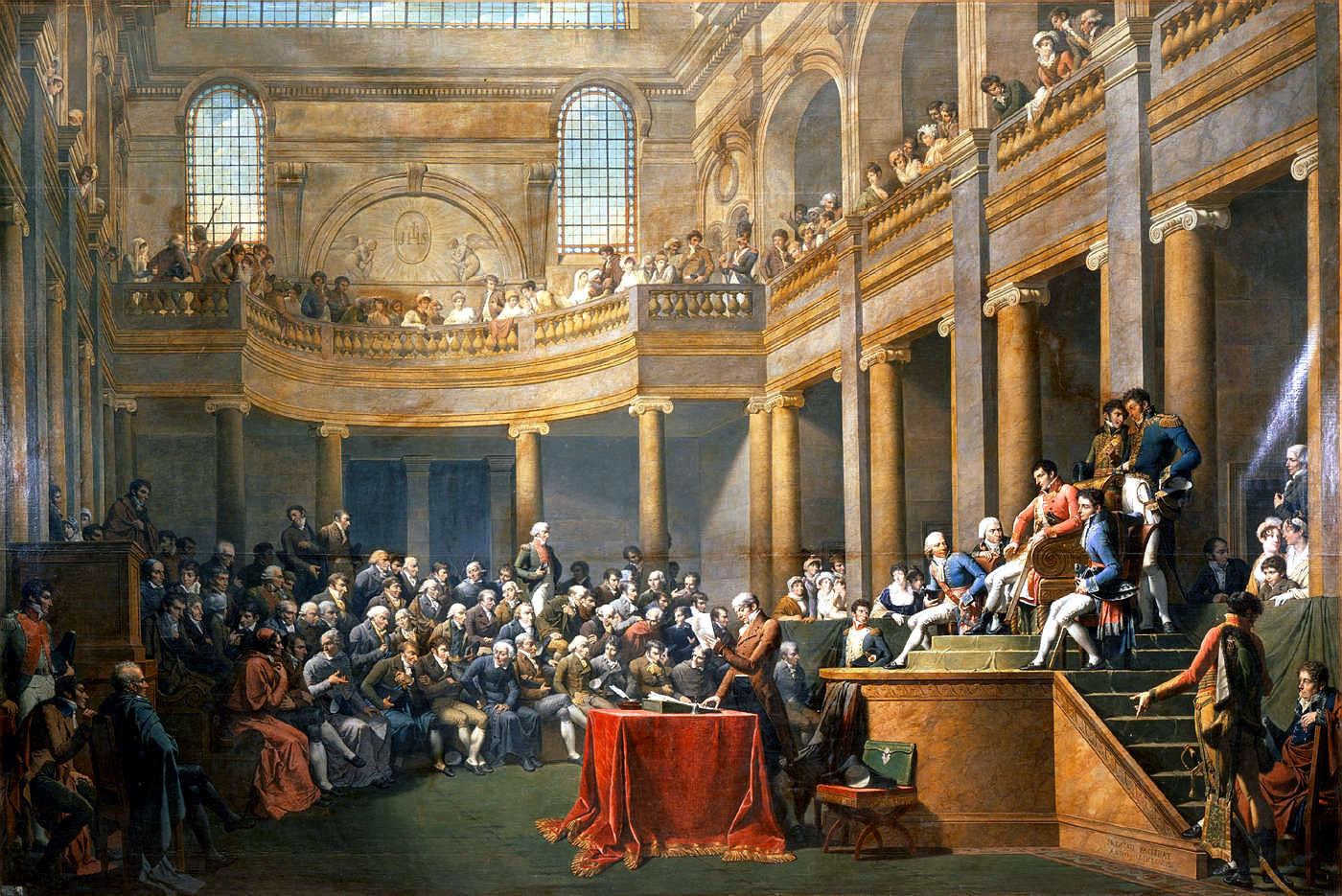
Painting showing the Consulate of the Cisalpine Republic taking place in Lyon by Nicolas-André Monsiau in the Château de Versailles.

Under the Napoleonic Empire, the Fabrique slowly rebuilt its production capacities, welcoming foreign investors and fostering a more modern and efficient working environment. To address the labor shortage and speed up production, a decisive advance was made with the development of the Jacquard machine.

==== Imperial orders and the restoration of the silk industry ====
At the beginning of the 19th century, silk production rose from the ashes, notably under Napoleon's influence. Aware of the economic potential of silk, he inquired about the situation of the Rhône economy, especially during his three-week stay at the Consulate of Lyon in the Cisalpine Republic in January 1802. He placed important orders for the Imperial Palaces. The first was granted to the merchant-manufacturer Pernon in 1802 for the Château de Saint-Cloud, followed by a second in 1807 for the throne room of Versailles. (Note: Zins & Privat-Savigny 2005, p. 128) In 1808-1810, several other manufacturers (Lacostat & Trollier, Bissardon, Cousin & Bony, and Grand-frères) produced various pieces for Versailles and the Château de Meudon. (Note: Zins & Privat-Savigny 2005, p. 130)

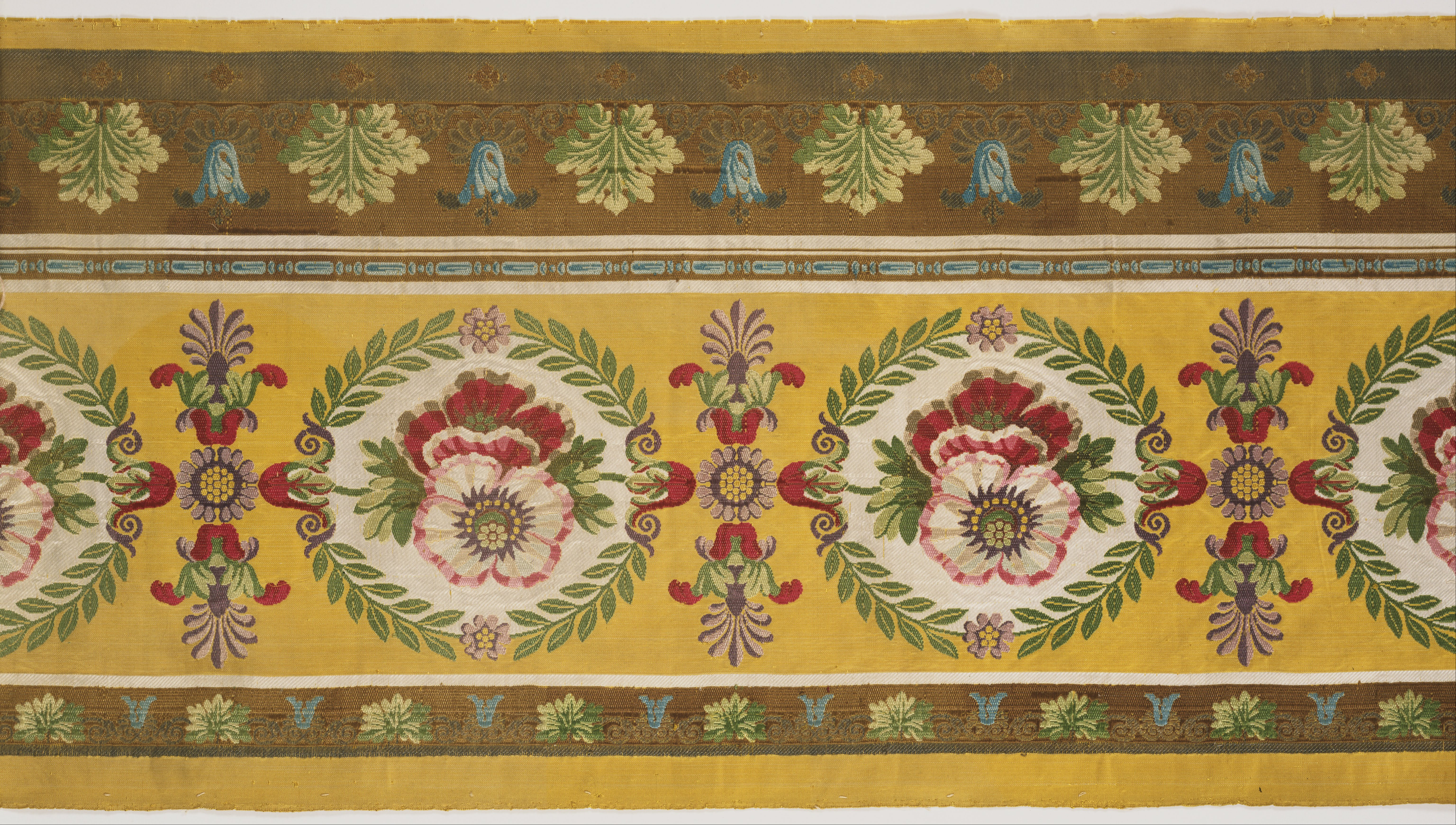
Silk piece made by Séquin & Co in 1811. Housed at the Philadelphia Museum of Art.

The most significant order came in 1811, for an exceptional amount of 2,000,000 francs to purchase over 80,000 meters of fabric. It was closely monitored by the administrator of the crown's furniture, Alexandre Desmazis, who stayed for a month in Lyon to oversee its implementation. It was divided among a dozen Lyon silk manufacturers, including Lacostat, Bissardon, Cousin & Bony, Grand-frères, Chuard, Dutillieu & Theoleyre, Corderier, Seguin, and Gros. (Note: Zins & Privat-Savigny 2005, p. 132)

Due to official purchases, production continued to grow under the Empire, with an average increase of about 1.7% per year. This allowed production levels to return to and exceed those of 1789. In 1801, silk fabric production was 35% lower than it was before the Revolution, but it reached this level again by 1810. (Note: Pelletier et al. 2007, pp. 674–675) Alongside the Fabrique, part of the textile sector, especially the areas most closely related to it, such as the production of precious metal threads and embroidery, experienced significant development under Napoleon.

==== A favorable environment ====
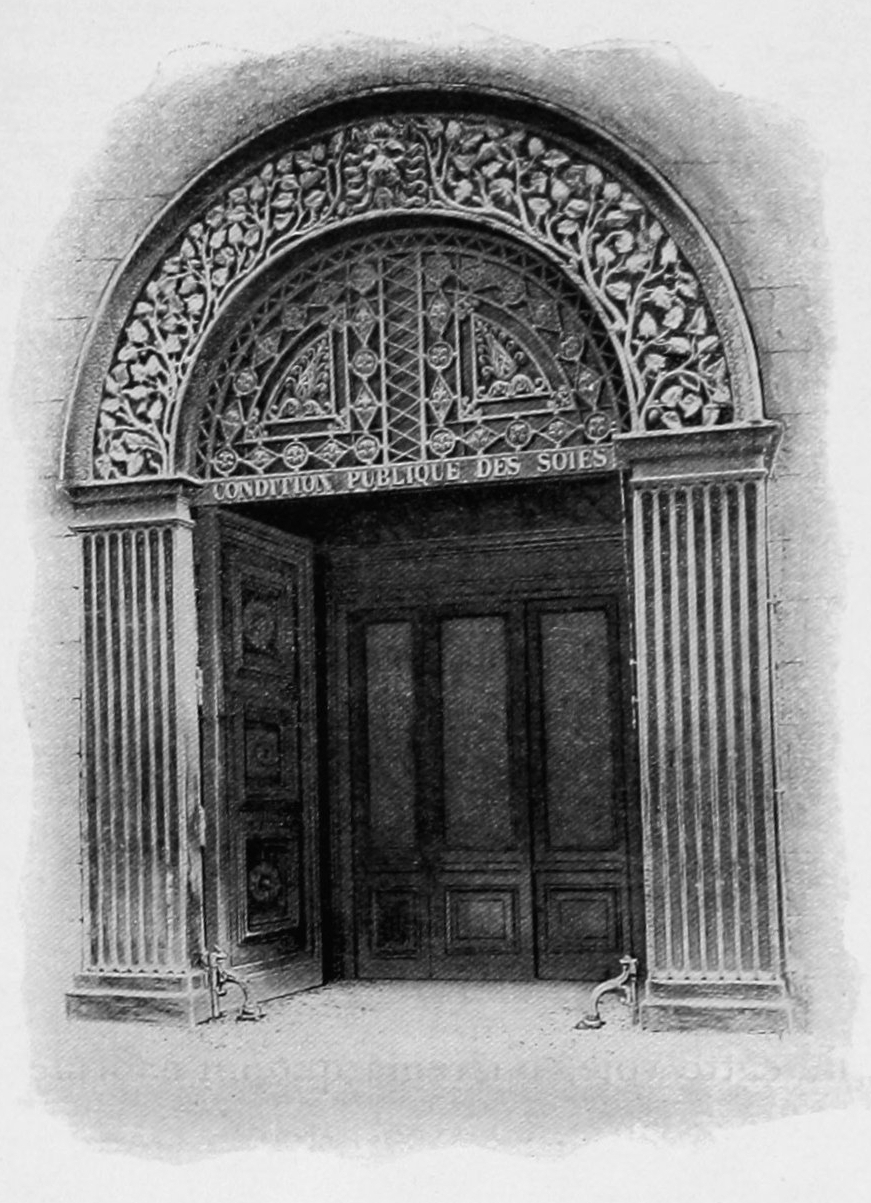
Entrance to the silk factory, one of the tools used to develop Lyon's textile industry in the 19th century.

The destruction of the regulatory framework of corporations during the Revolution led to a deep disorganization of the industry. The imperial power, strongly urged by Lyon silk manufacturers, implemented several reforms to restore professional organization and tools to improve the silk trade. It was responsible for the restoration of the Chamber of Commerce in 1802, (Note: Rey 2012, p. 286) the creation of the Condition des Soies in 1805, (Note: Rey 2012, p. 291) and the establishment of the very first council of prud'hommes, initially dedicated exclusively to Lyon silk. Lyon silk manufacturers gathered within a Société des amis du commerce et des arts to support the establishment of a provident fund for weavers, a regulated tariff, and professional training to ensure a certain quality of craftsmanship. (Note: Zins & Privat-Savigny 2005, p. 111) To support the artistic skills of the designers, an imperial school of fine arts was founded at the Saint-Pierre Palace, along with a museum in 1807, although the director Pierre Révoil quickly redirected the teaching towards art rather than industry. In the same movement, a drawing competition was established, with funding provided by the Chamber of Commerce.

Within the framework of imperial orders, significant progress was made in Lyon's dyeing chemistry sector. Following the discovery of defects in the first Pernon order, Lyon scholars conducted research to find more stable, beautiful, and affordable dyes. Napoleon also ordered the creation of a chemistry school in Lyon. The first director of this school, Jean-Michel Raymondf, discovered a process for producing Prussian blue with a form of cyanide, much cheaper than traditional methods. (Note: Zins & Privat-Savigny 2005, p. 118)

This period also saw the first "Expositions des produits de l'industrie nationale," where some Lyon merchant-manufacturers showcased their expertise. The first to exhibit was Camille Pernon in 1802. Subsequently, more and more silk manufacturers participated, and the exhibition catalogs helped track the evolution of techniques, styles, and fashions. (Note: Forray-Carlier & Valantin 2002, p. 100)

The silk industry, struggling to find local investors capable of revitalizing production and trade, welcomed many foreign companies to replace those that had fallen during the Revolution. Branches were established in the city, placing orders for simple fabrics intended for export to Europe or even further. These companies invested significant capital in Lyon, thus aiding in the recovery of the production apparatus. Among them were Swiss companies (mainly from Geneva) such as Diodati, Odier & Juventin, Memo, L. Pons, Dassier, Debar & Cie; German companies Feronce & Crayen (from Leipzig) and H. Reiss (from Frankfurt); and Italian companies Soresi (from Milan) and Travi (from Turin). Likewise, French silk entrepreneurs unable to find employment at home searched for work abroad, sometimes as far away as the Caucasus region of the Russian empire.

==== Mechanization of production with the "Jacquard Loom" and its consequences ====
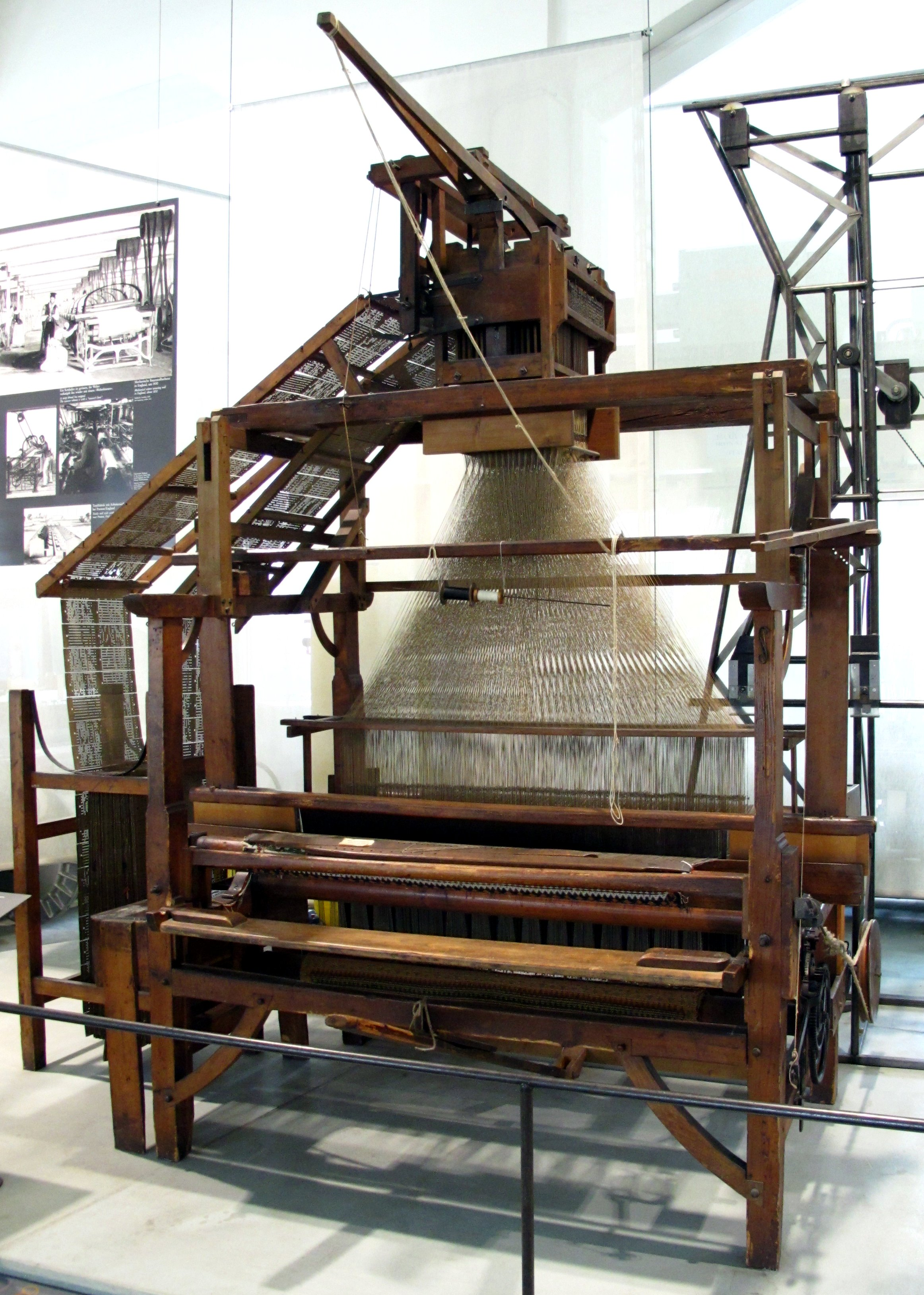
Jacquard loom in the Deutsches Museum, circa 1860.

In response to a prize offered in 1801 by the Société des amis du commerce et des arts for improving weaving looms, Joseph Marie Jacquard proposed a mechanism that allowed a single worker to create a complex fabric, instead of several workers as before. He built on the previous research of Basile Bouchon, who developed a needle loom in 1725, later improved by Jean-Baptiste Falcon, who added a system of punched cards, and by Jacques Vaucanson’s automatic cylinder mechanism from the 1750s. (Note: Zins & Privat-Savigny 2005, p. 114)

Initially unreliable, the Jacquard mechanism was continually perfected, notably by Albert Dutillieu (who invented the regulator in 1811) and Jean-Antoine Breton (who developed the chain drive for the punched cards in 1817, a decisive improvement). (Note: Zins & Privat-Savigny 2005, p. 115) However, the loom retained the name "Jacquard Loom," even though its historical significance did not fully correspond to its place in the technical evolution of weaving looms.

This investment in a mechanization device for production was explained by the persistent labor shortage that hindered all activity during this period. The population of Lyon was only 102,000 inhabitants, compared to 150,000 on the eve of the Revolution, and it did not increase beyond 120,000 inhabitants by the end of the Empire. (Note: Pelletier et al. 2007, p. 675)

During the 19th century, the mechanized loom became essential for producing plain silks or those with simple patterns, but it was less useful for more complex designs, which required an enormous amount of preparation time, regardless of the loom used. This mechanization led to a continuous decrease in the cost of simple silks, while fabrics with the most elaborate patterns remained very expensive. Once perfected, the Jacquard loom achieved great success, with the number of machines increasing from 41 in 1811 to 1,879 in 1820, while draw looms quickly disappeared, with workers themselves appreciating the time savings.

=== From the Restoration to the Third Republic: growth and peak ===
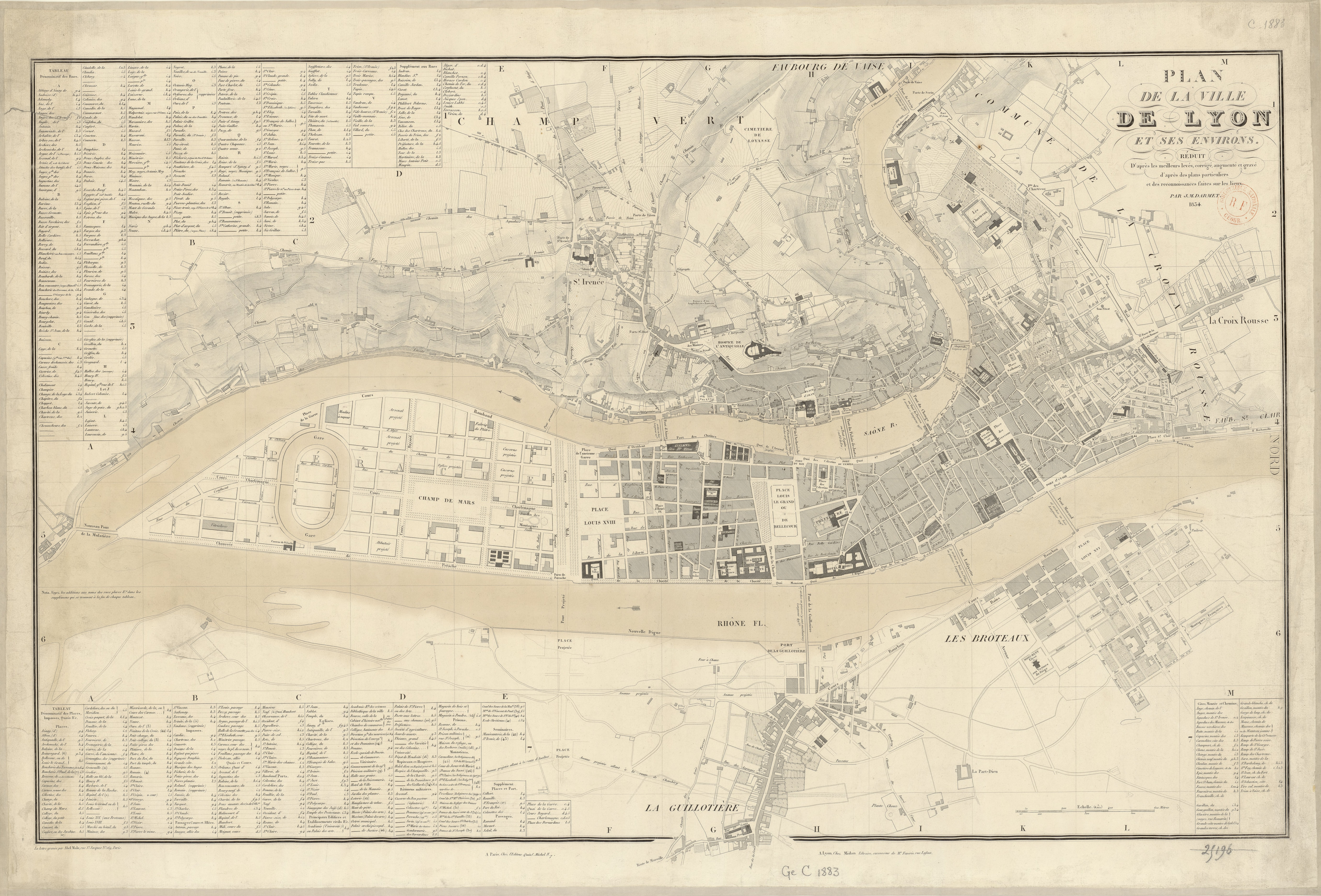
Map of the city of Lyon in 1834, with street and path index. It shows the Canuts district, the “Croix-Rousse commune.”

During this period, the upheaval of social structures saw the rise of the bourgeoisie, who, like the nobility, wanted to dress in silk. The Restoration of 1814 allowed Lyon's silk industry to diversify, particularly in liturgical garments. By the middle of the century, Lyon’s silk industry was flourishing. It produced a wide range of goods, sold all over the world, and excelled in international competitions. During the Second Empire, it was the most important export industry in France. This prosperity was the result of the confluence of three factors: merchant-manufacturers who invested heavily and ventured into new markets; a mass of independent weavers, referred to strictly as canuts, with a great deal of expertise, especially among the elite; and an artistic and scientific sector that fostered continuous innovation.

==== Organization of the Factory ====
The creation of a fabric within the Factory is a highly fragmented activity. It is therefore rare for merchant-manufacturer houses to employ weavers. Most of the time, they are order-givers, who contract manufacturers, finishers, and workshop managers. Similarly, many merchant-manufacturers do not sell their fabrics directly to the end customer. They usually go through commission agents tasked with placing their productions in cities around the world.

There was an exception to this fragmented organization: the La Sauvagère establishment, a factory-internship created in 1817 in Saint-Rambert-l'Île-Barbe, a former commune now annexed to Lyon. It was a shawl factory that integrated all stages of production. In 1827, it had 250 weaving looms. Workers slept at the factory in separate dormitories. This factory was considered a model to follow, as the food was inexpensive, and there were schools for the children. Its owner managed it in a paternalistic way, fostering a master-servant relationship rather than a typical employer-employee relationship, as in the rest of the Factory.

==== Silk supply ====
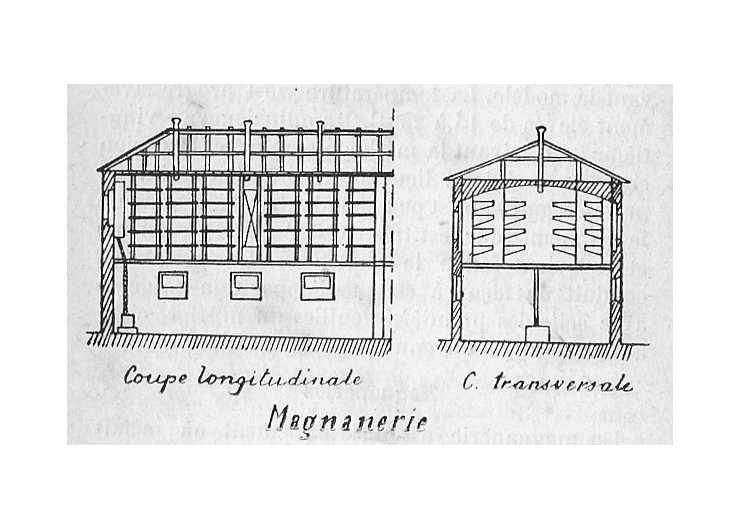
Diagram of a silkworm farm from the Encyclopédie Roret, L. Mulo, Paris, 1914.

Between 1815 and 1849, silk consumption quadrupled. Therefore, silk houses had to constantly find new sources of supply for raw silk or silk waste to be transformed into thread.

The masters of the Factory usually did not own their own silk production domain but bought raw silk or thread from specialized companies or intermediaries abroad. Until the mid-century, the raw material came half from the mulberry farms of the Cévennes and half from Piedmont and Asia. A few companies ventured into investment in production units, such as the Palluat-Testenoire house, which owned five factories near Mount Lebanon, or the Lyonnais Charles Payen, who established a successful spinning company in India starting in 1845.

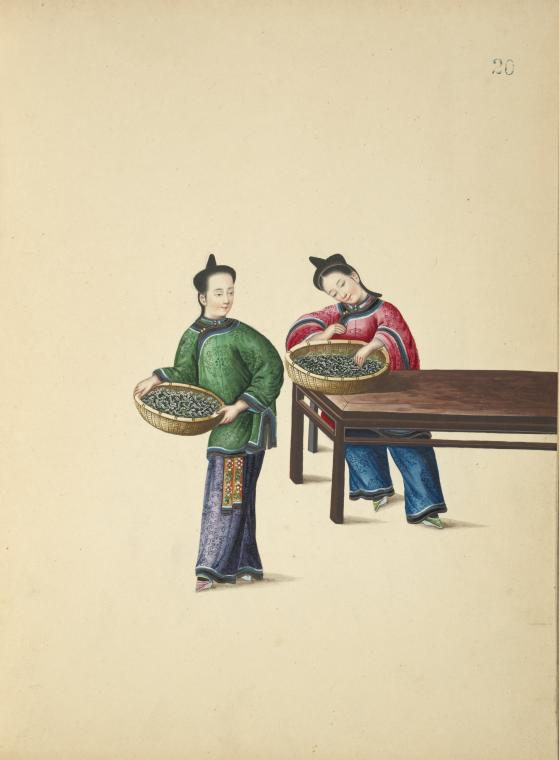
Chinese with silkworm cocoons. 1880 drawing from the archives of the New York Public Library.

Lyon’s presence in China became more notable, facilitated by the Lagrénée commercial exploration mission from 1843 to 1846. Commissioned by the French government, the mission organized a two-year stay in China, from 1844 to 1846, and collected a large assortment of textiles, cocoons, local products, and many reports on Chinese weaving techniques. The first house to settle there was that of Paul Desgrand. Exchanges between Lyon and China grew significantly, benefiting from the establishment of foreign concessions in China, the creation of a direct maritime line between Marseille and Shanghai, and the establishment of a warrant system.

In the 1850s, Cévennes silkworm farms were severely affected by several diseases: pébrine, flacherie, and muscardine. Despite Pasteur's work, production collapsed. As diseases spread across Europe, silkworm breeders then sourced the raw material mainly from China and, for the rest, from various countries where they had investments. The control of this sector by Lyon entrepreneurs was largely facilitated by the 1860 free trade treaty between France and the United Kingdom. It allowed Lyon’s silk exchange to dominate its English competitors, thus supplying its workshops at the best cost and reselling them throughout Europe.

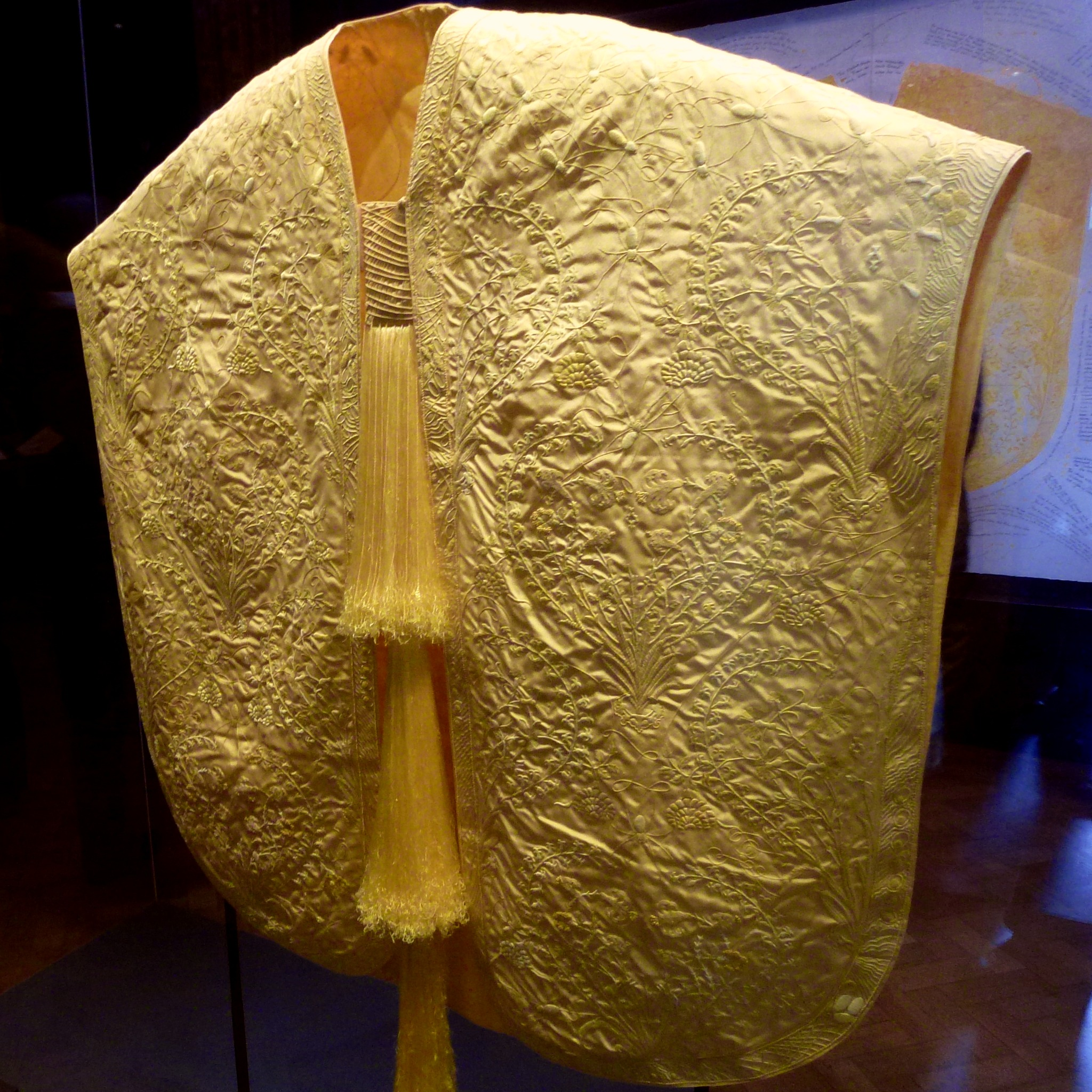
A Madagascar cape made from Nephila spider silk exhibited at London's Victoria and Albert Museum in June 2012.

At the end of the Second Empire, Japan became a supplier. The opening of Japan to the outside world during the Meiji era, from 1868, enabled the Lyonnais to establish a presence there. The Hecht, Lilienthal & Cie company gained a near-monopoly in the sector by supplying the entire equipment for the imperial army. They were paid in silk thread, which they resold through their Lyon-based parent company. The introduction of the Jacquard loom in Japan around this time led to the spread of Lyon patterns in local production.

At the very end of the 19th century, an experiment was attempted using the golden silk orb-weaver (also known as nephila madagascariensis, or halabé in Malagasy). This silk-producing spider, known since the early 18th century and native to Madagascar, weaves enormous webs of very strong silk (golden yellow in color) that are particularly suited for making luxury clothing. Tests were conducted in Lyon in 1893 for a presentation at the 1894 Universal, International, and Colonial Exposition. Father Paul Camboué, a Jesuit missionary in Madagascar, sent numerous samples of silk to the silk condition laboratory. Although the laboratory was very interested in the samples, they considered them too few in number to assess the industrial potential of spider silk and doubted that the Malagasy spiders would acclimate to the Lyon climate.

==== A productive system under strain ====
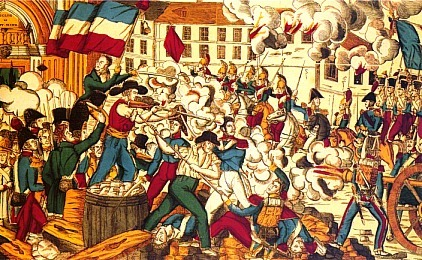
Battle in the streets of Lyon in front of the Saint-Nizier church - Canuts revolt, October 1831.

Under a very narrow elite, a large mass of workers populated the Factory, which, during the July Monarchy, was "perhaps the highest concentration of workers in a single industry in Europe." (Note: Lequin, Bayard & Dubesset 1991, p. 101) This mass consisted of more women than men. Unlike most other industries, Lyon silk production remained artisanal for a long time. The first mechanical loom was only installed in 1843, and only 7,000 existed by 1875. By 1866, there were 30,000 looms in Lyon and 95,000 in the surrounding countryside.

At the beginning of the century, production was concentrated in the city, especially on the hill of La Croix-Rousse, which was then an independent commune and thus exempt from the octroi tax until its annexation to Lyon in 1851. Later, the Factory spread out its production sites throughout Lyon, Beaujolais, extending to Dauphiné, Bugey, and Savoy. The term "canut" (Lyonnais silk weaver) was coined at the start of the century.

As in previous centuries, production was carried out by independent artisans paid per piece, and their relationships with the order-givers were often tense. Two major conflicts affected the productive system in the 19th century:

- In 1831, the first revolt of the canuts supported the demand for a minimum wage, first negotiated and then rejected by the manufacturers. From November 21 to December 2, a violent movement took place, with the insurgents taking control of the Croix-Rousse and Presqu'île districts. The canuts restored order in the city, administered it, and withdrew upon the arrival of the army led by Marshal Soult, the Minister of War.
- In 1833-1834, the tariff issue led to another general strike. The leaders were arrested, but their trial led to further riots (April 9–15, 1834), which were repressed (300 dead, many injured, and 500 arrests).

Overall, and according to historian Pierre Léon, these revolts did not significantly disrupt overall prosperity and allowed weavers to gradually improve their living standards. (Note: Léon 1974, p. 127)

During the Second Empire, the workers’ council, at the behest of the Chamber of Commerce, began collecting fabric samples. These were intended to ensure ownership of a pattern as well as to inspire designers and manufacturers. Unlike the previous century, designers specialized in purely artistic roles as pattern creators. Innovations no longer came from them but from workers or manufacturers. Often hired young as employees by silk houses, they were trained there and contributed little artistically. (Note: Charpigny 1993, p. 124)

With the adoption of the plain fabric fashion during the Second Empire, silk houses needed fewer designers and stopped hiring them. By 1870, those who remained had aged and no longer trained new ones, paving the way for a renewal crisis at the start of the Third Republic. (Note: Charpigny 1993, p. 125)

==== Outlets ====
Merchant-manufacturers completely control the outlets for production, with workshop managers never selling the fabrics they produce. The silk trade underwent significant changes throughout the century. Before 1815, the majority of the silk was distributed across the continent, in royal courts across Europe. Afterward, a sharp increase in customs tariffs shifted sales towards the United Kingdom and the United States. (Note: Pelletier et al. 2007, p. 678) Around the 1870s, these two countries absorbed 70 to 80% of Lyon's silk purchases.

Over the course of the century, 80% of the production was exported from France. (Note: Lequin, Bayard & Dubesset 1991, p. 100) Merchants opened branches as far as Mexico, Rio de Janeiro, and Buenos Aires. This commercial success marked the decline of other national production centers (Avignon, Tours, Nîmes), which gradually faded. Similarly, European competition (Krefeld or Elberfeld in Prussia, Zurich, Spitalfields in London, or Manchester) faded before the power of Lyon's Fabrique, which ended up capturing most of the global silk market, especially the high-end products that the Lyonnais focused on. (Note: Lequin, Bayard & Dubesset 1991, p. 109) As the Fabrique exported its products massively to the United States, the beginning of the Civil War immediately stopped a third of the machinery. Fortunately, the signing of a free trade treaty between France and England in 1860 immediately opened numerous new outlets.

Merchants and commissioners renewed their sales strategies: they popularized the use of samples, organized renewal rhythms, product differentiation, and ensured better training for designers. They relied on a high-performance production force, following the model of dispersed manufacture. From a given order, work was distributed complexly through multiple negotiations between workshops, looms, journeymen, and apprentices, depending on the product's nuances. To regulate and direct this work, Lyon's Fabrique relied on three components: transactions, institutions, and the city. Thus, from the 18th century, a policy of innovation was established at the city level. Following the Revolution and the Le Chapelier law prohibiting subordinated relations, a sort of "code of the Fabrique" was set up through successive experiments to regulate prices, loans, debts, and access to the profession with a democratic-inspired regulation. This distinguished the Fabrique from Jacobinism and economic liberalism. These principles were embodied by the creation of the reformed Tribunal of Arts and Crafts (1790-1791), the labor tribunals (1806-1807), and mutual societies (Devoir Mutuel in 1828).

Over time, the final clientele evolved. Traditional elites were joined by the highest echelons of European and American bourgeoisie. The significant purchasing power of this segment of the population allowed them to afford the mid-range products offered by Lyon's silk manufacturers (plain, mixed silks), with silk remaining a powerful social marker.

==== The major Lyon silk houses ====
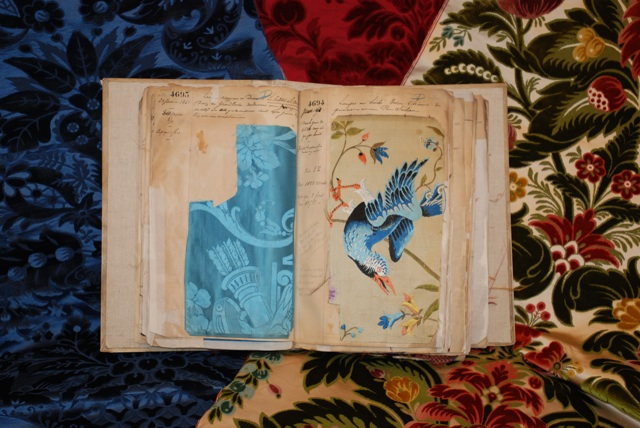
Book featuring patterns from the Prelle company, dating from 1861.

Some of the major names in Lyon's silk industry in the 19th century include: Arlès Dufour (merchant of silks and banker), Baboin (specialized in silk tulle), Bellon and Couty (manufacturers whose company, later becoming Jaubert and Audras, was the largest in Lyon by the end of the Second Empire), Bonnet (specialized in black unis and promoter of factory-internats, later becoming Richard & Cottin), Dognin and Isaac (silk tulle manufacturers), (Note: Cayez & Chassagne 2006, p. 108) Falsan, Gindre (makers of satin and taffetas), (Note: Cayez & Chassagne 2006, p. 169) Giraud, (Note: Cayez & Chassagne 2006, p. 174) Girodon, (Note: Cayez & Chassagne 2006, p. 176) Gour, (Note: Cayez & Chassagne 2006, p. 181) Grand frères (later taken over by Tassinari & Chatel in 1870 (Note: Tassinari 2011, p. 109)), Guerin (silk merchant and banker, descendant of a family from the 17th century), Le Mire, now known as Prelle, Martin (velvet and plush manufacturer), (Note: Cayez & Chassagne 2006, p. 205) Monterrad (fabricators of fashioned silks), (Note: Cayez & Chassagne 2006, p. 210) Montessuy & Chomer (makers of silk crepe), (Note: Cayez & Chassagne 2006, p. 212) Payen, (Note: Cayez & Chassagne 2006, p. 231) Pignatel (silk merchants), (Note: Cayez & Chassagne 2006, p. 242) Riboud, (Note: Cayez & Chassagne 2006, p. 257) Testenoire. (Note: Cayez & Chassagne 2006, p. 266) Also significant were the dye houses, such as Gillet (specialist in black dye), (Note: Cayez & Chassagne 2006, p. 162) Guinon (Lyon's largest dyer), (Note: Cayez & Chassagne 2006, p. 191) and Renard (founder of fuchsine), (Note: Cayez & Chassagne 2006, p. 251) as well as families of thread makers. In 1866, there were 122 silk merchants, 354 merchant-manufacturers, 84 dyers, and many small businesses involved in the silk industry (card readers, comb makers, shuttle manufacturers, degreasers, finishers, etc.).

The world of silk entrepreneurs steadily expanded with the growth of the business, doubling in the first fifty years of the century. Afterward, the number of silk manufacturers stabilized at around 350 to 400. This meant that, on average, each one's wealth increased. At the same time, there was a concentration of power, placing most production means in the hands of an elite. In 1855, the top thirteen companies supplied 43% of the woven silk in the Lyon region. This proportion rose to 57% by 1867. These most powerful houses had the capital to invest in mechanical machines, standardizing their products. They often integrated numerous annexes such as embossing machine manufacturers, finishers, dyeing workshops (including the first chemical dyes), etc. (Note: Pelletier et al. 2007, p. 679) Studying inheritances confirms this picture, showing how the world of trade gradually merged into that of industry, with cross-investments enabling this elite's wealth to grow considerably. This world of silk merchants was geographically concentrated, primarily at the base of the Croix-Rousse hill, in the Tolozan and Croix-Paquet neighborhoods. (Note: Lequin, Bayard & Dubesset 1991, p. 102)

Most of these large Lyon silk houses were created by newcomers in the 19th century, but some families had been involved in silk manufacturing and trading since the Old Regime, such as the Payen family, whose ancestor, Jean-François Payen d'Orville (1728-1804), was a silk merchant in Lyon and Paris, or the Baboin family, which already owned a silk manufacturing and trading business in Drôme and Lyon in the 18th century.

Other houses created in the 19th century took over structures that already existed in Lyon before the Revolution, such as the Belmont and Terret house, where in 1814, the Belmont brothers succeeded their father-in-law Jean-Charles Terret, an important silk manufacturer in Lyon at the end of the 18th century.

==== Economic success of the silk industry ====
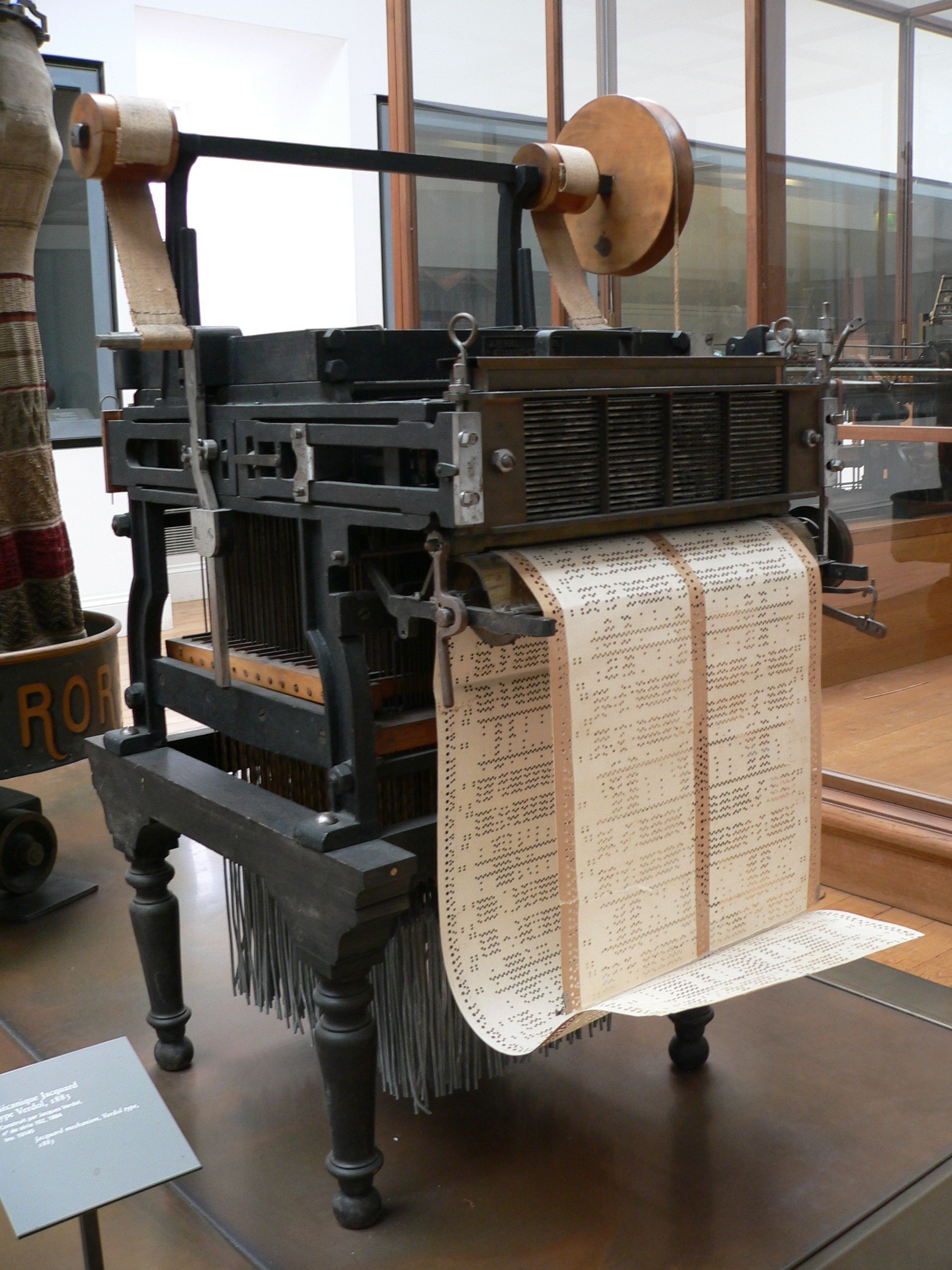
A “Jacquard” loom topped by a Verdol mechanism, a tool of Lyon's prosperity. Musée des Arts et Métiers.

During the first two-thirds of the 19th century, silk production was the driving force behind the wealth of the Rhone city, with annual growth rates of about 4%, while the French average was 1.5%. The value of foreign sales was 60 million francs in 1832 and grew considerably to 454 million francs in 1860. This increase, like in previous centuries, was very uneven, with periods of pressure and off-seasons; however, it was not significantly affected by the two revolts of the canuts. Angleraud and Pellissier even argued that the French Revolution, despite the destructions, was "only a minor event in the long growth of the Lyon Fabrique."

The Industrial Revolution had little impact on the Fabrique, which remained a labor-intensive economy, easily supported by the high value of the finished product. The number of looms increased from 18,000 in 1815 to 37,000 around 1830 and 105,000 in 1876. The Prefect of the Rhône, in 1837, provided the following evolution: in 1789, there were 16,000 to 17,000 looms; under the Empire, 12,000; from 1824 to 1825, 27,000; and in 1833, 40,000. This growth forced the order-givers to install looms not in the city, which was saturated, but in the suburbs and surrounding countryside. (Note: Pelletier et al. 2007, p. 676) The economic success of this sector allowed silk workers to gradually emerge from poverty, and for the most skilled among them, to achieve some degree of comfort. The turning point in this development occurred during the Second Empire, the peak of the Fabrique's prosperity.

==== Silk, the foundation of Lyon's chemistry ====
The Fabrique was an expanding sector, which brought along other parts of the Lyon economy and scientific activity. Chemistry benefitted significantly. The preparation and dyeing of silk required mastery of many chemical products. Until the Revolution, dyes were obtained using natural products. A true revolution occurred in the 19th century, with Lyon chemists, driven by the needs of a powerful textile industry, fully involved in this transformation. (Note: Lequin, Bayard & Dubesset 1991, p. 111)

At the beginning of the 19th century, most of these substances were derived from sulfuric acid, which explains the presence of many "vitriol" manufacturers in Lyon. Before artificial dyes were invented, silk had to undergo a mordanting process to be dyed. The only effective vat dye was indigo, and others had to be preceded by a mordant. Lyon’s dyers experimented with many mordants (gallic acid, alum, green vitriol, rust, iron pyrolignite, verdigris, tin moss, etc.). In 1856, English chemist William Henry Perkin discovered aniline purple, later called mauveine in Lyon. "Not only was this dye easy to apply without a mordant, but it gave silk a particular sheen that could not be achieved with natural dyes." (Note: Laferrère 1990, p. 244)

This novelty sparked great interest in chemistry in Lyon, especially within the professional training at the Lycée de la Martinière, which produced chemists specializing in dyeing, such as Nicolas Guinon, Étienne Marnas, and Emmanuel Verguin. Verguin synthesized fuchsine, another aniline dye, in 1858, which was more stable than mauveine. (Note: Laferrère 1990, p. 245)

==== The evolution of style and commerce in Lyon's silk industry ====
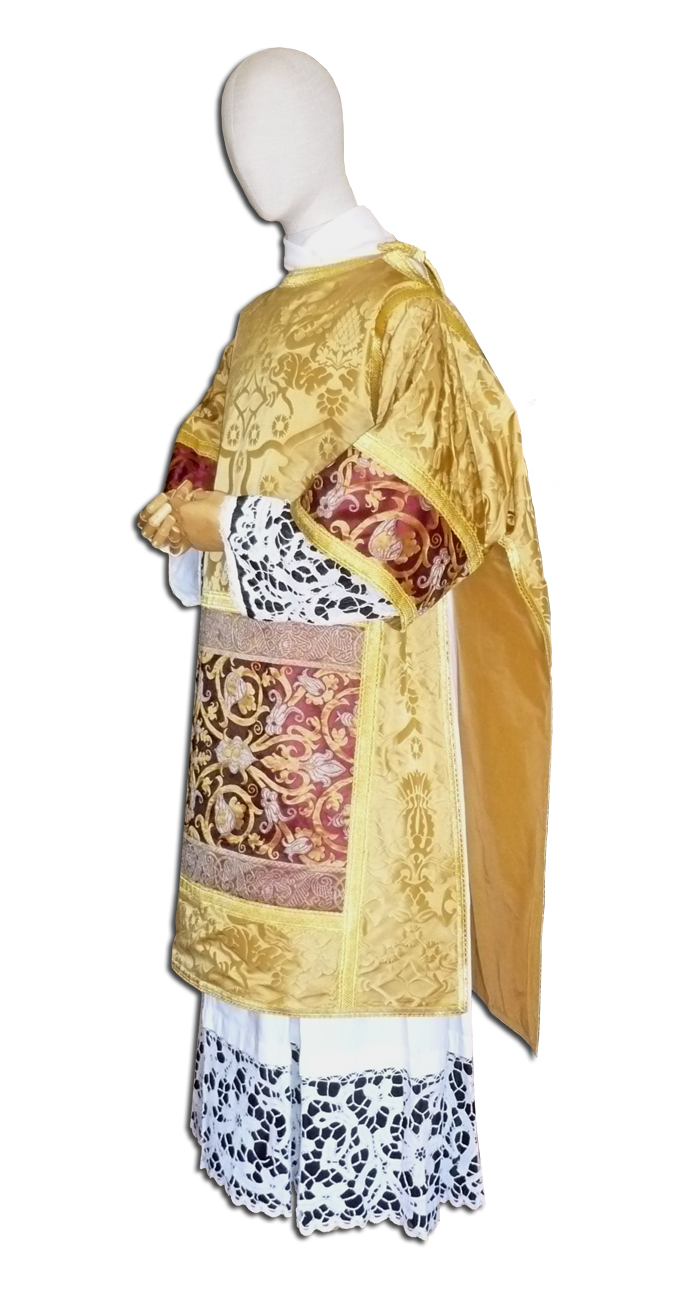
Dalmatic.

The style of Lyon’s Fabrique was primarily characterized by floral inspiration, often in a naturalistic perspective. Another typical aspect was the desire to showcase technical prowess. Throughout the century, the greatest silk houses presented the best of their know-how during the Expositions des produits de l'industrie française, and later at the World's fair, when they replaced the former in 1851. They made pieces pushing their technical capabilities for these events, which allowed them to secure prestigious orders. The products displayed represented the evolution of their style or clientele. (Note: Forray-Carlier & Valantin 2002, p. 101)

==== Lyon silk style under the restoration: The taille-douce ====
During the Restoration period, one fabric became particularly successful: the damask intaglio, contributing to the creation of the Restoration style. "Designed to give the illusion of an engraving, these fabrics require, more than any other, a deep knowledge of mechanics and the resources it can offer." (Note: Forray-Carlier & Valantin 2002, p. 102) The production of this fabric was made possible by technical improvements made by Étienne Maisiat and E. Moulin to the Jacquard loom, with the first installing a system of rods to make cuts and bindings almost invisible and the second inventing carding that produced the illusion of taille-douce. The main house exploiting this technique was Chuard, which received numerous awards. The Cordelier house also wove damask taille-douce.

==== Under the July Monarchy: the fashion of the Orient and the rise of liturgical silk ====
During the July Monarchy, the silk sector, in addition to its traditional outlets (clothing and furnishings in Europe), saw the notable development of two areas: liturgical paraments in France and sales to the Orient. (Note: Forray-Carlier & Valantin 2002, p. 110) The rise of Catholic faith and the need, after difficult decades for parishes, to rebuild liturgical vestments provided a large clientele for the production of dalmatics, chasubles, pluvials, conopaeas, and dais. Among the manufacturers involved in this sector was the Lemire house. Already significant in the 18th century, trade with the Orient expanded greatly during this time, particularly with the productions of the Prelle house.

==== Under Napoleon III: the Fashion of Neo-Gothic and solid fabrics ====
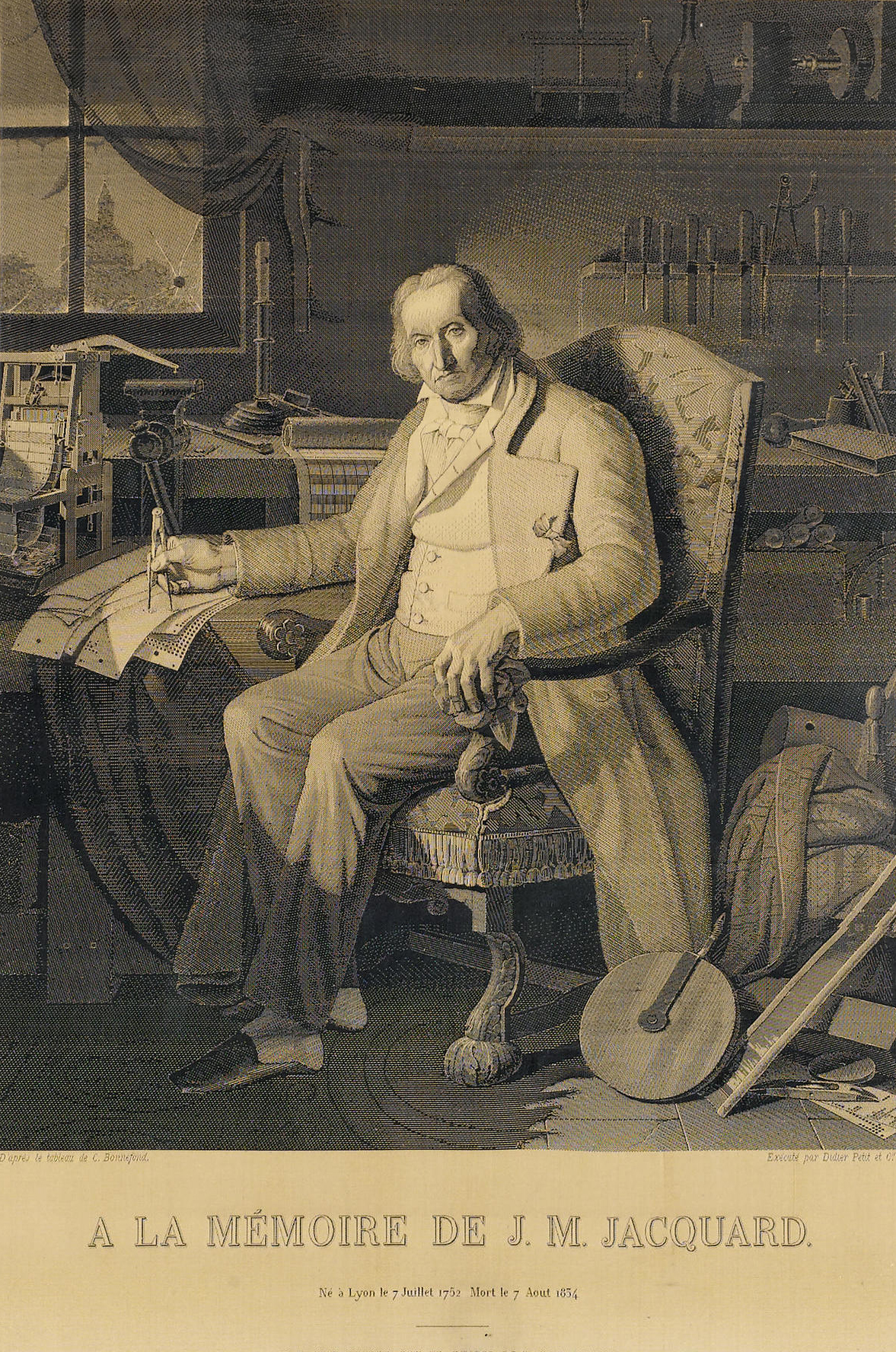
Woven portrait of Joseph Marie Jacquard by Carquillat (circa 1839).

In the mid-19th century, the neo-Gothic movement spread throughout society, affecting all forms of art and craftsmanship. (Note: Valantin 1997, p. 171) Neo-Gothic patterns appeared in pattern books around 1835, reaching their peak during the Second Empire. These patterns were intended not only for Catholic liturgy, with demand peaking between 1855 and 1867 but also for furniture and clothing. The Lemire and Prelle houses produced large quantities of fabrics using these patterns. (Note: Forray-Carlier & Valantin 2002, p. 133) Prelle, in particular, obtained designs from Viollet-le-Duc, Reverend Arthur Martin, and Abbot Franz Bock. (Note: Valantin 1997, p. 172) Viollet-le-Duc drew inspiration from medieval iconography for his sketches but did not copy existing fabrics. (Note: Valantin 1997, p. 173) Arthur Martin created designs for Prelle combining medieval and more modern styles. (Note: Valantin 1997, p. 175) The latter, compiler of several studies on ecclesiastical clothing from the Middle Ages, provided the Lyon manufacturer with exact copies of fabrics he had collected and analyzed. (Note: Valantin 1997, p. 178) Other houses followed, such as Tassinari & Chatel from 1866. However, these trends only affected a portion of the production, with the bulk remaining faithful to the defining traits of the Fabrique, notably floral figurative patterns.

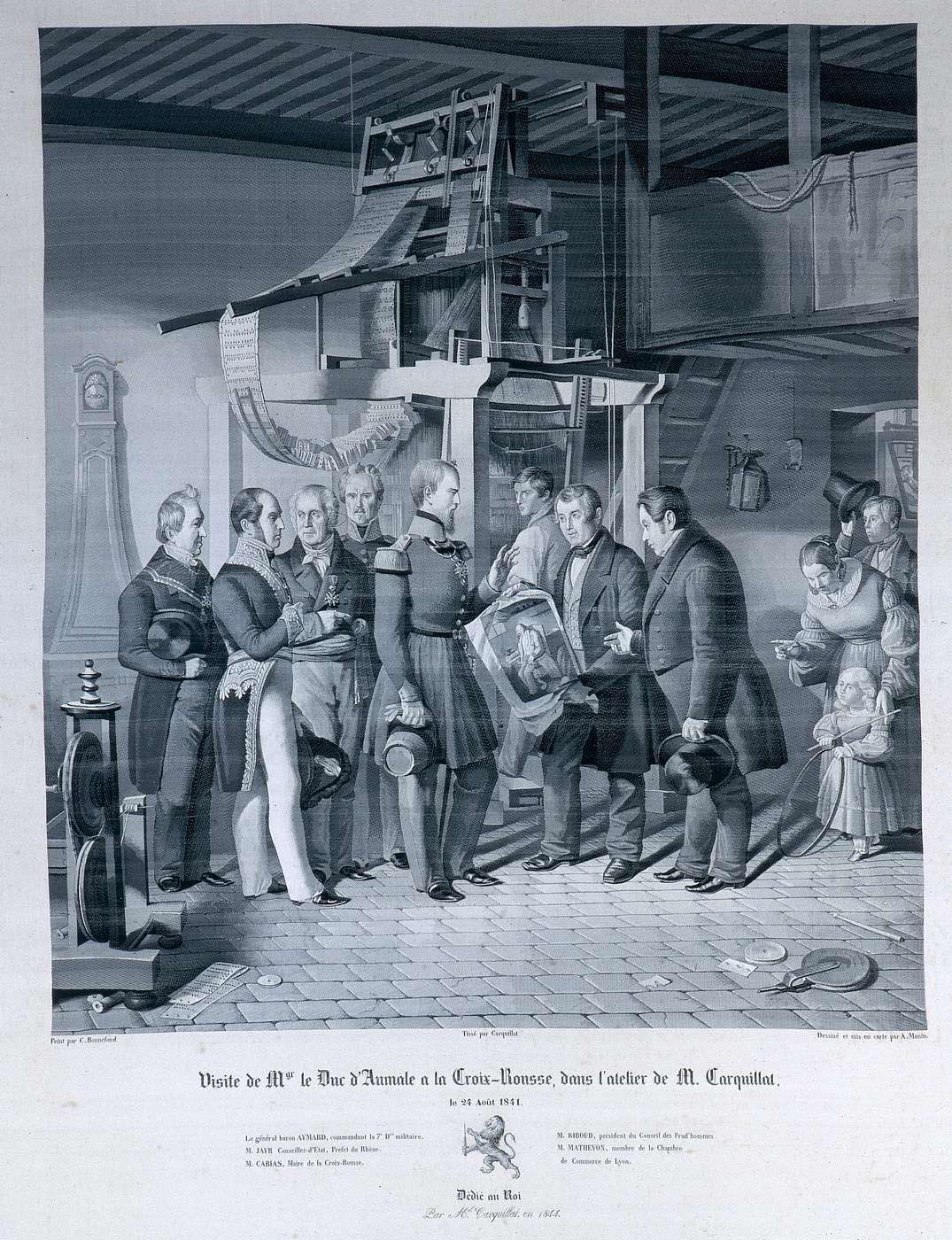
Mgr le Duc d'Aumale's visit to the Croix-Rousse in M. Carquillat's workshop. Woven by Carquillat in 1844.

Another trend emerged, driven by the tastes of the court, especially those of Empress Eugénie. Moving away from patterns, she sought solid fabrics whose appeal came from the material and colors. Manufacturers then offered "fabrics that were falsely solid, shiny taffetas with brilliant flaws, satins, moires, in gray, blue, and burgundy." (Note: Soria 2002, p. 100) Modern moire was invented in Lyon by Tignat in 1843. (Note: Hardouin-Fugier et al. 1994, p. 264) However, patterns still had imperial favor when tone-on-tone. To compensate for the absence of designs, manufacturers also used lace. Their prestigious fabrics still found clientele for items like shawls or ball gowns. In the 1860s, Lyon's Fabrique, with its solid fabrics, turned toward a more modest clientele. Using easily mechanized techniques, manufacturers varied weaves and dyes to offer diversity. (Note: Forray-Carlier & Valantin 2002, p. 143)

Alongside the reorientation of part of its production toward simple fabrics, Lyon silk sought to maintain its place in luxury furniture and clothing for the elite. To achieve this, they showcased technical prowess at exhibitions, such as the curtain designed in 1867 by the Lamy & Giraud house and created by designer Pierre-Adrien Chabal-Dussurgey, which required 91,606 cards for its weaving. (Note: Forray-Carlier & Valantin 2002, p. 148) During the Second Empire, Lyon’s Fabrique experienced unprecedented prestige at the first World Expositions. At the first, held in London in 1851, "the Lyon exhibition demonstrated the undeniable supremacy of 'high novelty' and 'great luxury,' exemplified by the Mathevon & Bouvard house, or the James, Bianchi & Duseigneur house. It displayed silk scarves and shawls from Grillat Ainé, and the famous silk woven portraits of Carquillat." After London, the 1855 Paris World Exposition further solidified Lyon’s dominance in the sector. The most admired house of this session was Schulz Frères, who produced Empress Eugénie's wedding gown in 1853 and that of Brazilian Empress Teresa Cristina of the Two Sicilies in 1856.

== The Third Republic: decline and conversion ==
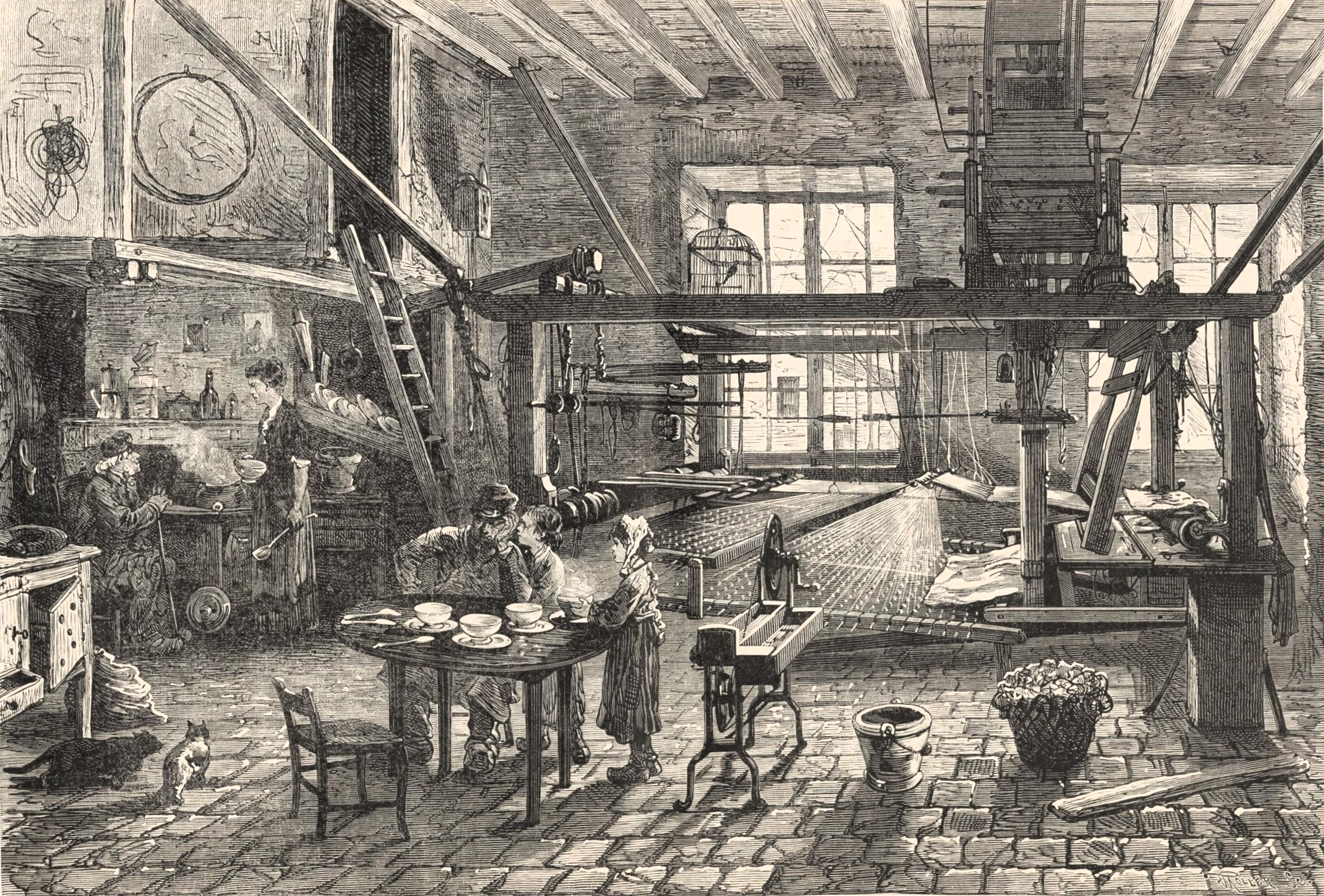
Interior of a canut, at the time of the 1877 crisis.

With the advent of the Third Republic, the decline of Lyon’s Fabrique began. The main causes were the public's disinterest in finely crafted silks and the rise of new competition. Despite numerous attempts at adaptation and solutions, the sector collapsed with the crisis of the 1930s.

=== The 1880s: first decline ===
The golden years lasted until 1875-1876, but then the trend took a sharp downturn. At the turn of the 1880s, the years of crisis followed one another. (Note: Lequin, Bayard & Dubesset 1991, p. 107) The Lyon silk industry was first hit by the general contraction of the French and European economy. However, this cyclical event only partially explains the sector's difficulties. Additionally, fashion definitively turned away from pure and finely crafted silks, opting for mixed fabrics such as crepes, gauzes, and muslins. The rise of fabrics where silk was mixed with other materials (cotton, wool) was definitive, driven by cost reasons. (Note: Lequin, Bayard & Dubesset 1991, p. 108) Other, even lower-quality fabrics gained prominence due to their even lower prices, such as tussah silk made from the tussah silkworm or schappe.

At the same time, competition became fiercer in the context of protectionist tariffs. Textile industries across Europe, often more recent, quickly adapted to market demands. Lyon had to yield its top position in the global silk market to Milan. Even American, Japanese, and Chinese silks began to compete with those from Lyon. This difficulty in facing globalization was reflected in supply networks. While the crisis of the 1850s was overcome, it was due to investments in Italy and the Levant. However, Lyonnais manufacturers were barely present in Asia, with a few attempts, such as the Pila initiative, being exceptions. (Note: Angleraud & Pellissier 2003, p. 100)

Changes in the number of Fabrique-related merchant-manufacturers in Lyon
| | 1867 | 1870 | 1875 | 1880 | 1890 |
|---|---|---|---|---|---|
| Silk manufacturers | 399 | 386 | 370 | 372 | 282 |
| Tulle manufacturers | 67 | 74 | 51 | 54 | 44 |

Many silk houses closed during this decade. By the 1890s, the surviving houses were striving to adapt to this new situation.

=== The turning point of the Belle Époque: Attempted adaptation ===
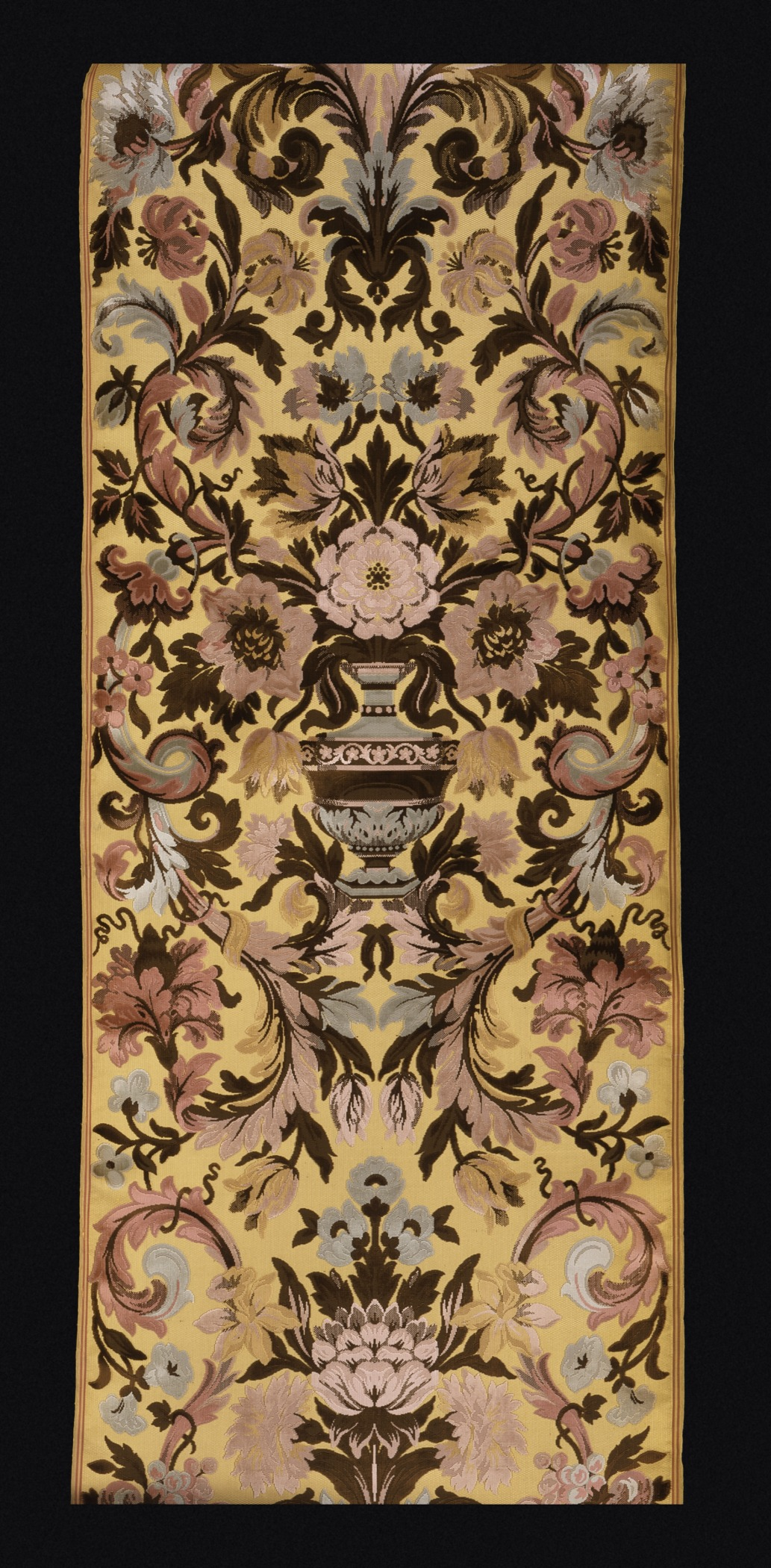
Silk and linen blended fabric by Prelle, made circa 1876. Housed at the Los Angeles County Museum of Art.

Reactive, Lyon’s silk manufacturers managed to respond to the crisis during the Belle Époque by adapting heavily. Some houses were even created during these years, such as Société S. Blanc, F. Fontvieille & Cie in 1905, which specialized in silk fabrics for corsets and later expanded and diversified, experiencing significant growth. The most dynamic houses produced new fabrics, embraced mechanization, and wove other materials. However, World War I abruptly halted nearly all production.

==== New fabrics ====
Many manufacturers turned decisively towards new fabrics, regaining a prominent position in the global market for precious materials until the 1930s. These fabrics either mixed silk with other materials (wool, cotton) or used lower-quality silks. As a result, manufacturers did not hesitate to adopt the methods of their competitors to remove any competitive advantage. (Note: Lequin, Bayard & Dubesset 1991, p. 112)

In the same movement, a part of the textile industry turned to fully synthetic materials. Several silk manufacturers thus founded the "Société lyonnaise de la soie artificielle" in 1904; although many within the industry did not fully embrace this less noble thread. (Note: Angleraud & Pellissier 2003, p. 116) The commercial successes of the Lyon silk industry until the 1920s were largely due to rayon and fibranne. As a result, businesses that only used natural silk saw a significant decline, while the Lyon textile industry as a whole managed to maintain its position.

==== Mechanization ====
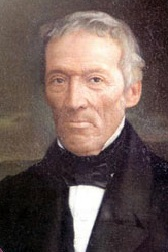
Claude-Joseph Bonnet, one of the precursors of the industrialization of silk weaving.

Industrialists embarked on an intense mechanization of their production tools. The number of mechanical looms increased from 5,000 in 1871 to 25,000 in 1894 and 42,500 in 1914. Pure silk, being fragile, was not suited for heavy mechanization. However, the rise of mixed threads or lower-quality silks resolved this issue, and many prominent silk manufacturers turned to these looms to reduce costs, such as the Bonneta house. (Note: Angleraud & Pellissier 2003, p. 101) This growth did not mean the immediate disappearance of hand looms, but their numbers quickly decreased. Before World War I, however, mechanization only affected lower and medium-quality silks, not rich silks or fabrics with complex patterns. The fragility of the finest fibers and the difficulty in preparing a Jacquard loom to reproduce intricate designs made their production on mechanical looms unprofitable at the time. The number of hand looms was 115,000 in 1873, still 56,000 in 1900, and only 17,300 in 1914. (Note: Angleraud & Pellissier 2003, p. 102) Overall, the increase in mechanical looms allowed the silk industry to boost production capacity by 25% between 1877 and 1914.

This change mainly affected looms located within the city walls. The Lyon hand looms were not replaced on-site but moved to neighboring regions, especially in Isère, towards Voiron, La Tour-du-Pin, or Bourgoin. Some companies even closed their hand loom operations in Lyon to open spinning mills abroad. For example, the Payen company opened and expanded several spinning factories in Italy. S. Blanc, F. Fontvieille & Cie owned a spinning factory in England. Similarly, the Guérin company invested in Italy, before purchasing the Mont Liban spinning mills in 1900 from Palluat, Testenoire, and Cie. (Note: Angleraud & Pellissier 2003, p. 108)

==== Supply ====
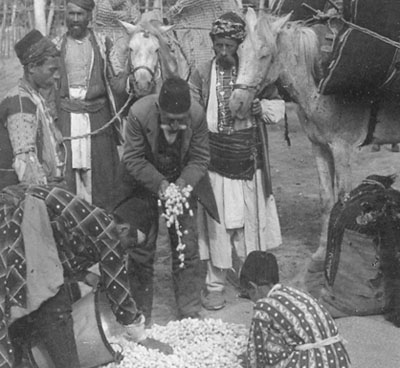
Sale of silk cocoons near Antioch to buyers in Lyon. Circa 1890-1900.

The most enterprising silk manufacturers surpassed the traditional practices of the industry and boldly ventured into the direct importation of raw or processed materials from Asia. The silk mills in the Far East had made significant qualitative and quantitative progress. Communication and transportation systems were far more efficient, as were international commercial networks, making direct purchases without intermediaries more reliable. Companies such as Permezel did not hesitate to pursue this strategy, as did Veuve Guérin et fils, which invested in mills in the Middle East by purchasing the Palluat-Testenoire factories. (Note: Angleraud & Pellissier 2003, p. 107)

To better understand Chinese silk, following the example of the Lagrénée mission of 1844, a second expedition was organized at the invitation of Frédéric Haas, the French consul in Hankou. This time, the Lyon Chamber of Commerce sent Ulysse Pila as organizer and delegated commissioner. Delegates from other cities and industrial sectors were invited, bringing the expedition to a total of thirteen members. They left Marseille in September 1895, arrived in Saigon a month later, and traveled throughout China for two years. Upon their return, they published a book and numerous technical reports that were widely used by Lyon silk manufacturers.

The search for better silk thread supplies led the Chamber of Commerce to establish the "Silk Study Laboratory" in 1885. The goal was to better understand the silkworm to ensure the highest quality silk thread. This institute conducted research on the life of the silkworm and the characteristics of its silk. The results were used to improve the mechanization of spinning and weaving. This laboratory also expanded its research to all silkworm species, creating an important collection of animals. The laboratory was located on the second floor of the Condition des soies building. Alongside the laboratory, a silk museum was established to house the specimens collected by the institution, provided by silk merchants, other museums, consular agents, or individuals. By 1890, the museum was open to the public and educational institutions. It also showcased its collections throughout France at various events, such as universal exhibitions.

==== Specialization ====
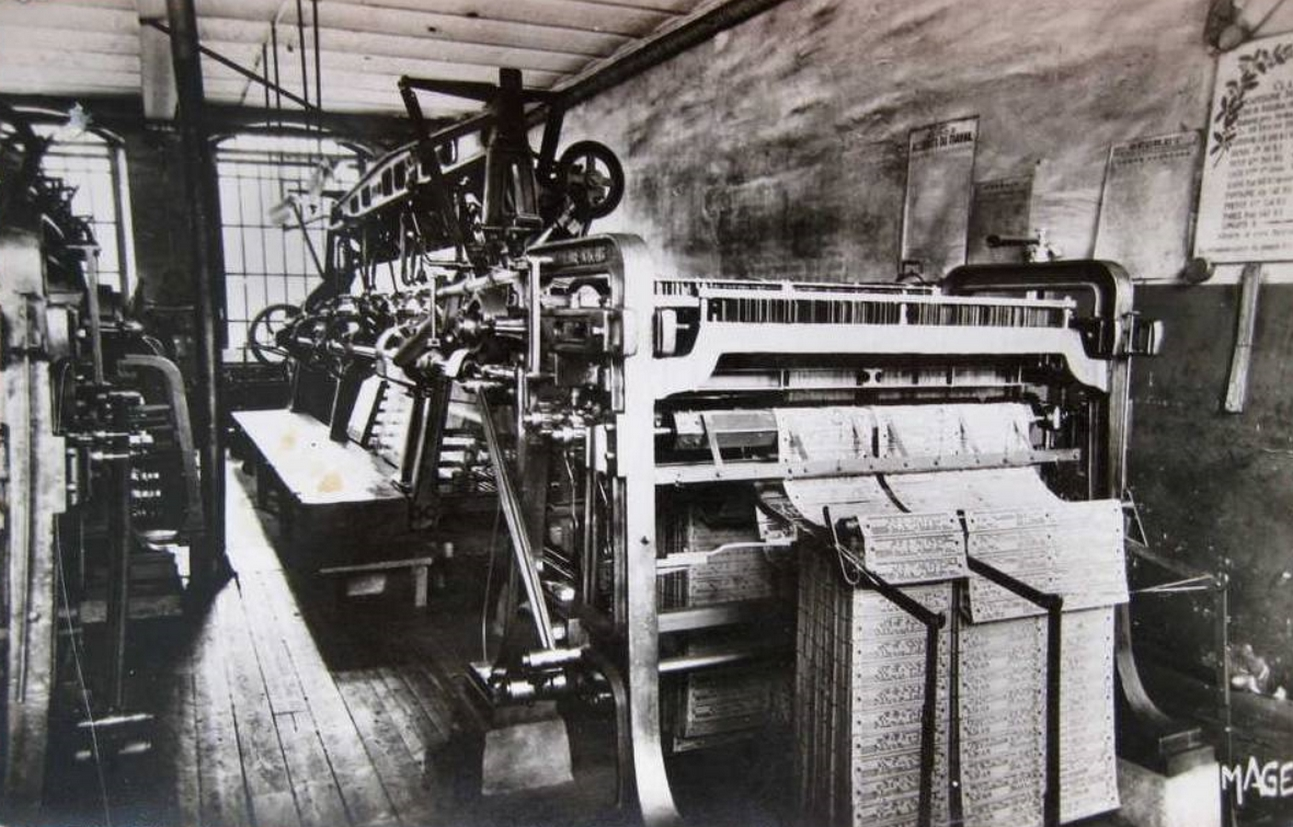
A lace loom with a Jacquard mechanism.

Other companies, finally, attempted to overcome the crisis by narrowing their activities around a core clientele and product. For instance, the Tassinari and Chatel company dedicated itself from the start of the crisis until the 1910s to upholstery fabrics. After 1910, the specialization policy continued with the abandonment of religious textiles. (Note: Angleraud & Pellissier 2003, p. 113)

Other businesses specialized in high-end clothing, opening counters in Paris close to the elites and top couturiers who dictated fashion trends. For example, the Atuyer-Bianchini-Férier company established itself near the Garnier Opera and hired prestigious artists to design its patterns, including Raoul Dufy from 1912 to 1928. (Note: Angleraud & Pellissier 2003, p. 114)

==== Change of range ====
A majority of manufacturers during the Third Republic turned decisively towards the cheap silk market. Fabrics with classical floral patterns found fewer and fewer customers and began to decline around 1900. It was during this period that Art Nouveau patterns made their appearance, following the general fashion trend. (Note: Forray-Carlier & Valantin 2002, p. 151)

Accompanying the rise of the "Little Newness" trend during the Belle Époque, which saw manufacturers adopt the motifs and themes of High Newness in simplified configurations and lower-quality materials, many silk manufacturers decisively entered this market that had previously been left to foreign manufacturers. The most emblematic company of this commercial strategy was the one led by Léon Permezel, who, through various technical means, managed to add value to silk waste and less noble materials to mass-produce. (Note: Angleraud & Pellissier 2003, p. 115)

==== Other initiatives ====
More symbolically, in 1886, the Lyon City Council created a brand featuring the city's arms, allowing buyers to recognize fabric woven in Lyon. In the same years, and despite some resistance within the professional community, the city opened a weaving school to help the textile industry have a pool of skilled weavers. (Note: Béghain et al. 2009, p. 432)

The Chamber of Commerce opened a business school in 1872, the École supérieure de commerce de Lyon, to improve the efficiency of salespeople in the textile industry. Hosting the school from Mulhouse that had moved after the annexation of Alsace-Lorraine by the German Empire, it was inspired by foreign institutions and quickly integrated a weaving course.

=== The trial of the Great War ===
During the First World War, the textile industry suffered greatly. The luxury market was paralyzed, European clientele became inaccessible, and the profitable Russian Empire market vanished. At the other end of the supply chain, imports of raw silk, whether from Italy or Asia, came to a halt. Moreover, a large portion of workers and employers were mobilized. Activity sharply slowed in 1914. (Note: Angleraud & Pellissier 2003, p. 181) It timidly resumed in 1915 at a very low level and slowly improved during the war. Silk supply also restarted, and the issue for the firms became a shortage of labor.

Evolution of the Fabrique's production, by volume
| Year | 1913 | 1915 | 1916 | 1917 | 1918 |
|---|---|---|---|---|---|
| Index | 100 | 65 | 65 | 70 to 75 | 80 |

The blockage of significant imports of German chemical products and the mobilization of production resources for other activities by the military posed heavy problems for dyers. The measures taken to continue production despite this were extended deadlines, the use of substitute products, and a reduction in the range of colors offered to clients.

Unlike other industries that could shift their focus to war efforts, the silk industry did not have this option. Therefore, it did not directly benefit from the 1914-1918 war. (Note: Angleraud & Pellissier 2003, p. 182) However, one effect of the conflict was that manufacturers who managed to find an outlet turned towards artificial silk or other fibers, continuing the evolution of production initiated before the war. Another consequence of the war was the opening of markets traditionally held by German manufacturers to French firms. The Netherlands and Scandinavian countries opened up to Lyon silks, and other markets, where Lyon agents had competed with Germans, became easier to prospect: the United States, Brazil, Argentina, and Spain.

=== The surge of the 1920s and the collapse with the Great Depression ===
After the difficulties caused by World War I, the silk industry rebounded vigorously. The modernization of production with the widespread shift to mechanization and the boost from Paris's status as the global fashion capital made this possible. Evolving from pre-war developments, silk manufacturers created a new model, successful during the 1920s, but insufficient to survive the Great Depression. This crisis revealed the remaining weaknesses within the silk industry and marked the end of the Lyon silk industry.

==== The 1920s: Little newness and high luxury, the new model of the industry ====
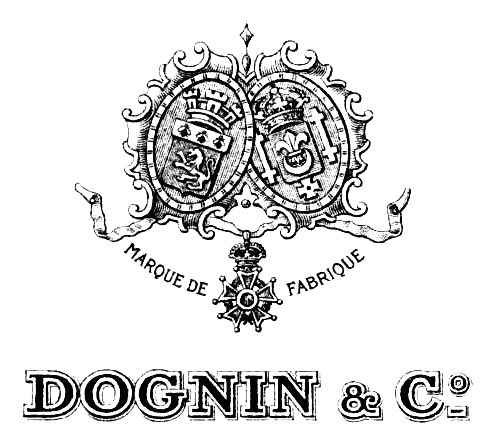
The arms of the Dognin family.

During the 1920s, the Lyon textile industry experienced significant commercial growth due to advanced mechanization, outlets in haute couture, and the rise of ready-to-wear fashion. This period also saw commercial circuits shift dramatically, focusing strongly on the new global power, the United States. (Note: Angleraud & Pellissier 2003, p. 194) Among the companies that experienced great success during this time were Bianchini-Férier, Ducharne, and Coudurier-Fructus. (Note: Charpigny 1993, p. 126)

===== Mechanization and rationalization =====
During the 1920s, the textile industry entered a new era by definitively abandoning hand looms. For many major companies, this era saw a generational shift in leadership, with new leaders unafraid to embrace mechanization. Whether they focused on luxury or more accessible products, these companies industrialized. Traditional artisan weavers, who owned two or three looms and worked for a merchant-manufacturer, disappeared in large numbers during this time. (Note: Angleraud & Pellissier 2003, p. 192) There were still 17,300 hand looms in 1914, but by 1924, they had decreased to only 5,400, marking a definitive trend. For many companies, this industrialization was accompanied by rationalization of production, incorporating as many steps of the process as possible into a single factory. The Dognin company and Petits-fils de Cl.-J. Bonnet are examples of this policy. In general, companies already engaged in this process, or those that adopted it vigorously, achieved success, allowing them to invest in new openings or significant factory expansions. Simultaneously, many companies ventured into weaving artificial fibers, mainly viscose. (Note: Vernus 2006, p. 105)

===== Mass production: Little newness =====
By modernizing, the silk manufacturers were in step with the prosperity of the Roaring Twenties. They followed the enthusiasm of urban middle-class consumers looking for fashionable clothing at a reasonable price. The commercial circuits set up moved from haute couture models, which were simplified and produced with cheaper materials. Couture houses thus sold not only unique, luxurious garments but also models designed for a clientele wishing to imitate the elites. "In America, primarily in New York, the models sold are adapted to be reproduced in mass. Each one is accompanied by a 'reference sheet,' given by the seller, which contains information to facilitate its replication: fabric quality, required meterage, or names of suppliers." (Note: Vernus 2006, p. 102)

===== Following Parisian fashion: Lyon silk manufacturers and global luxury =====
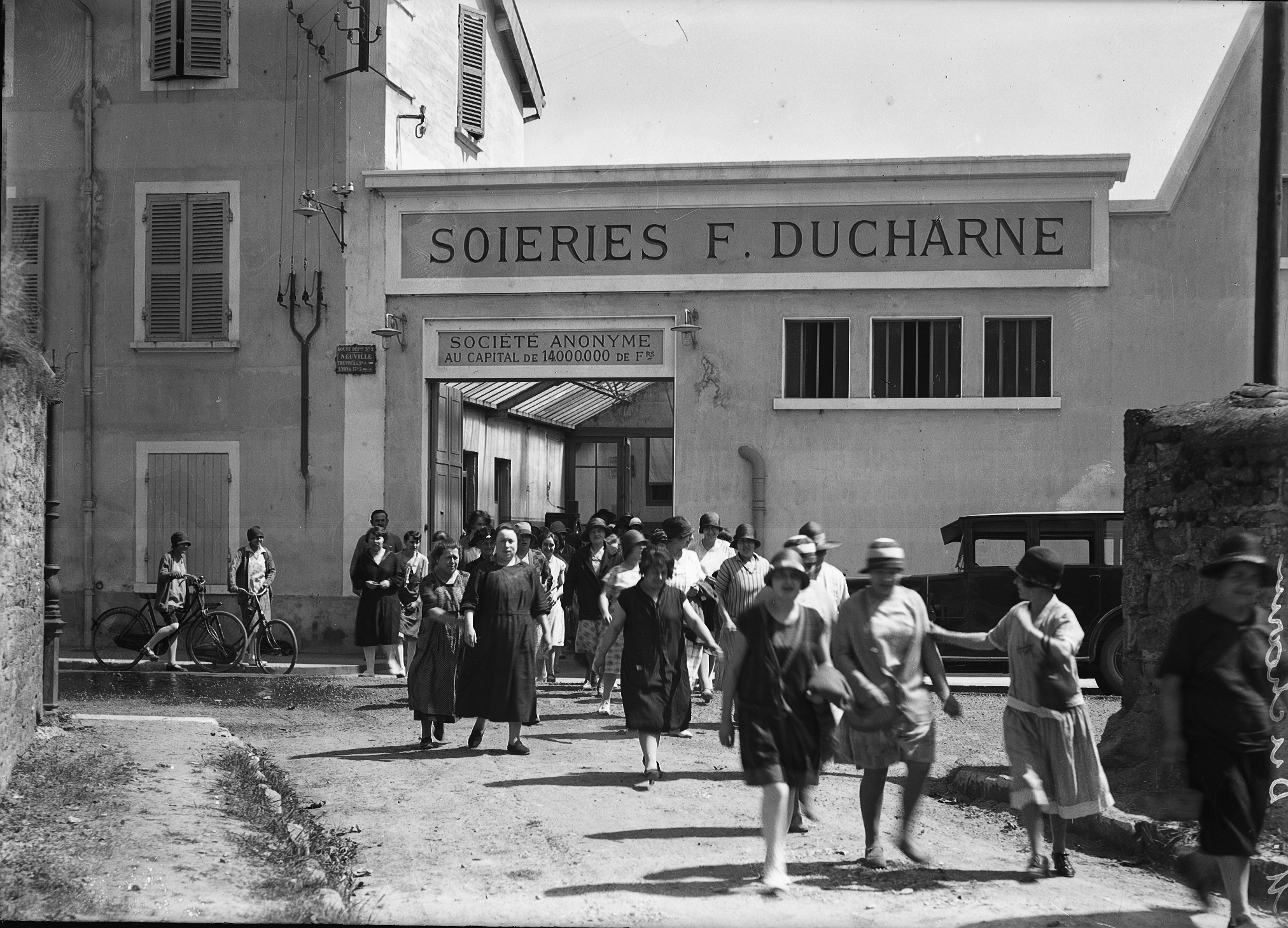
Workers leaving the factory, Soieries F. Ducharne, Neuville-sur-Saône, 1930.

Lyon silk manufacturers also benefited from Paris’s status as the global fashion capital, allowing them to stay at the forefront of creativity. The majority of the houses closely followed Parisian haute couture trends, which dictated fashion developments. By creating high-quality novelty fabrics, they regained a dominant position in the global luxury market. The multiplication of haute couture houses at this time allowed most Lyon houses to find buyers. The clientele of these haute couture houses, which became heavily Americanized, consisted mostly of professional buyers, with a small portion being extremely wealthy individuals. While the former were highly sought after for their ability to ensure a collection's fame, the latter were valued for the volume of fabric they ordered. (Note: Vernus 2006, p. 101) To have a team of designers capable of closely following Parisian fashion, the textile industry established a school directly in Paris, the Dubost School.

Among the houses that emerged during this period is Ducharne Silk, founded in 1920 in Lyon and Neuville-sur-Saône, which quickly turned toward manufacturing fabrics for French haute couture.

However, the luxury sector remained fragile. The tastes of the elite changed, and they moved toward less luxurious daytime clothing. Women, in particular, abandoned sophisticated dresses for daily activities, reserving them for evening outings. This reduced the demand for the most precious silks. (Note: Vernus 2006, p. 103)

==== The industry during the 1929 crisis ====
Most of the large Lyon silk houses maintained an elitist mode of operation and did not benefit from the cost reductions allowed by the introduction of artificial fibers, which could lower selling prices and target a more modest clientele. They only used artificial fibers marginally, to add specific features or new qualities to natural silk. In 1927, while the Lyon metropolitan area produced over a third of France's artificial fiber, its own fabrics contained no more than 10%, with many houses still refusing to introduce it into their products. When the 1929 crisis struck the United States, Lyon’s silk industry, which had massively exported for the American elite, felt the shock acutely. Despite full-order books, the industry continued to operate acceptably until 1932, but the leaders saw a crisis approaching, leaving them without viable fallback options. The prosperity of the 1920s had led to the rise of many small houses offering medium to low-quality silk fabrics. These flooded the market, which, when the crisis hit, became saturated for several years, forcing many actors to sell at a loss. (Note: Vernus 2006, p. 172) Furthermore, their refusal to invest in cheaper materials (cotton, wool) deprived them of alternatives at a time when silk was no longer in demand. (Note: Angleraud & Pellissier 2003, p. 196)

The shock was severe. Between 1928 and 1934, the value of silk production collapsed by 76%. Over these eight years, fifty companies disappeared, reducing the number of silk houses from 119 to 69. Important and long-established companies, such as Guérin, Payen, and Ulysse Pilat, collapsed. (Note: Angleraud & Pellissier 2003, p. 197) In terms of value, during the same period, the city's silk exports fell from 5,150 million francs to 1,200 million francs. Exports, vital for the survival of the Lyon industry, also dwindled. In value, they dropped from 3,769 million francs in 1928 to 546 million francs in 1936. In volume, they only halved, indicating a sharp drop in selling prices. (Note: Vernus 2006, p. 174)

To survive, many companies abandoned silk entirely and shifted fully to artificial fibers. Although these fibers were much less profitable, their low cost still allowed them to find a market. Thus, while the share of silk in Lyon’s exports dropped by 83% in just five years, between 1929 and 1934, rayon’s share increased by 91%. This abrupt and final conversion marked the end of silk in Lyon. By 1937, rayon represented 90% of the raw materials used by Lyon's textile companies. (Note: Angleraud & Pellissier 2003, p. 198) To survive, many companies turned to the domestic market, especially colonial markets, though these were limited. (Note: Vernus 2006, p. 178) For the first time, the textile industry in Lyon could not find a unified response to overcome the new crisis. The various regulatory solutions proposed failed one after the other, and it remains unclear whether any of them would have provided a solution. (Note: Vernus 2006, p. 182)

The lowest point was reached in 1936, but the timid recovery in 1937 and 1938 was just a brief stagnation before the new shock of World War II.

== From World War II to the 21st century: End of the Lyon silk industry and commercial mutations ==
The shift of most manufacturers to rayon production in the 1930s was only an illusory solution, and this sector collapsed during the post-war period of economic growth. Despite efforts to organize and support the sector with advisory and mutual aid structures, natural silk was confined to a luxury market. Meanwhile, Lyon developed expertise in the preservation, restoration, and heritage enhancement of silk.

=== World War II ===
France’s entry into World War II dealt a severe blow to Lyon's silk industry. Imports of raw silk stopped, and exports became nearly impossible. (Note: Vernus 2006, p. 218) They only resumed in 1946, making the use of rayon indispensable for continued production. (Note: Vernus 2006, p. 246) As for the artificial silk industry, it found itself in competition for supplies in Vichy’s controlled economy with other national industries. (Note: Vernus 2006, p. 219) Attempts by the Vichy administration to modernize textile production in Lyon produced minimal effects. They were hindered by local resistance, competition between structures, and the inherent difficulties of the period. (Note: Vernus 2006, p. 220)

The import and export of silk were nearly at a standstill in 1945, only gradually resuming in the following years. The constraints of the administration and the disorganization of the sector prevented any significant production recovery until 1948. Additionally, in the early post-war years, there were difficulties in sourcing secondary raw materials (mainly dyestuffs).

=== End of a dominant industry ===
The second half of the 20th century saw the traditional structure of Lyon’s textile industry disintegrate and disappear, despite numerous attempts to survive. The structures meant to reinvigorate it failed to halt the collapse in sales and workforce numbers. During this period, the Lyon textile industry ceased to be an economic force shaping the region. The few surviving houses focused on the elitist segments of high luxury, haute couture, and the restoration of antique fabrics.

==== Decline of Lyon's textile industry ====
The adoption of artificial silk, rayon, by Lyon silk manufacturers during the 1929 crisis was only a temporary solution to the crisis. This fiber was strongly challenged by the emergence of nylon in the 1950s. However, this new material required much heavier investments, which most textile houses could not afford. (Note: Angleraud & Pellissier 2003, p. 645) At the same time, efforts to modernize production tools were highly insufficient, with manufacturing times and volumes remaining lower than most other global textile production areas. The textile industry could not shift to producing low-cost ready-to-wear lines. (Note: Vernus 2006, p. 249)

This led to another wave of disappearances. Between 1964 and 1974, the number of companies fell by 55%, and the number of factories by 49%. The smallest companies disappeared first, but some established institutions also went bankrupt, such as Gindre in 1954 and Dognin in 1975. The workforce in the textile industry dwindled significantly. Between 1974 and 1988, the number of workers in the region’s textile sector dropped from 43,000 to 18,000. The number of looms also decreased from 23,000 in 1974 to 15,000 in 1981 and 5,750 in 1993. (Note: Vernus 2006, p. 316)

==== Industry organization ====
To resist the decline, several Lyon silk houses united in a structure to pool investments and better disseminate contacts and ideas. This "Groupement des créateurs de Haute Nouveauté," established in 1955, includes eight companies, such as Brochier, (Note: Vernus 2006, p. 269) Blanc Fontvieille & Cie, and Bianchini-Férier. This institution achieved several successes, allowing many houses to withstand the crises of the sector. (Note: Angleraud & Pellissier 2003, p. 652) The silk industry later relied on several other organizations that helped it survive and grow, such as Unitex in 1974 (a Lyon association offering advice to textile companies), Inter-soie France in 1991 (an association gathering Lyon's silk industry players and organizing the Lyon silk market), and the international silk association. (Note: Boucher 1996, p. 108) (Note: Angleraud & Pellissier 2003, p. 661)

=== Reorientation of Lyon’s silk industry ===
The traditional outlets are no longer available to the Fabrique, with luxury almost no longer using silk and price competition for ordinary articles becoming untenable. As a result, the last Lyon silk companies have shifted toward technical textiles, restoration, and heritage activities.

==== End of the traditional silk industry clientele ====
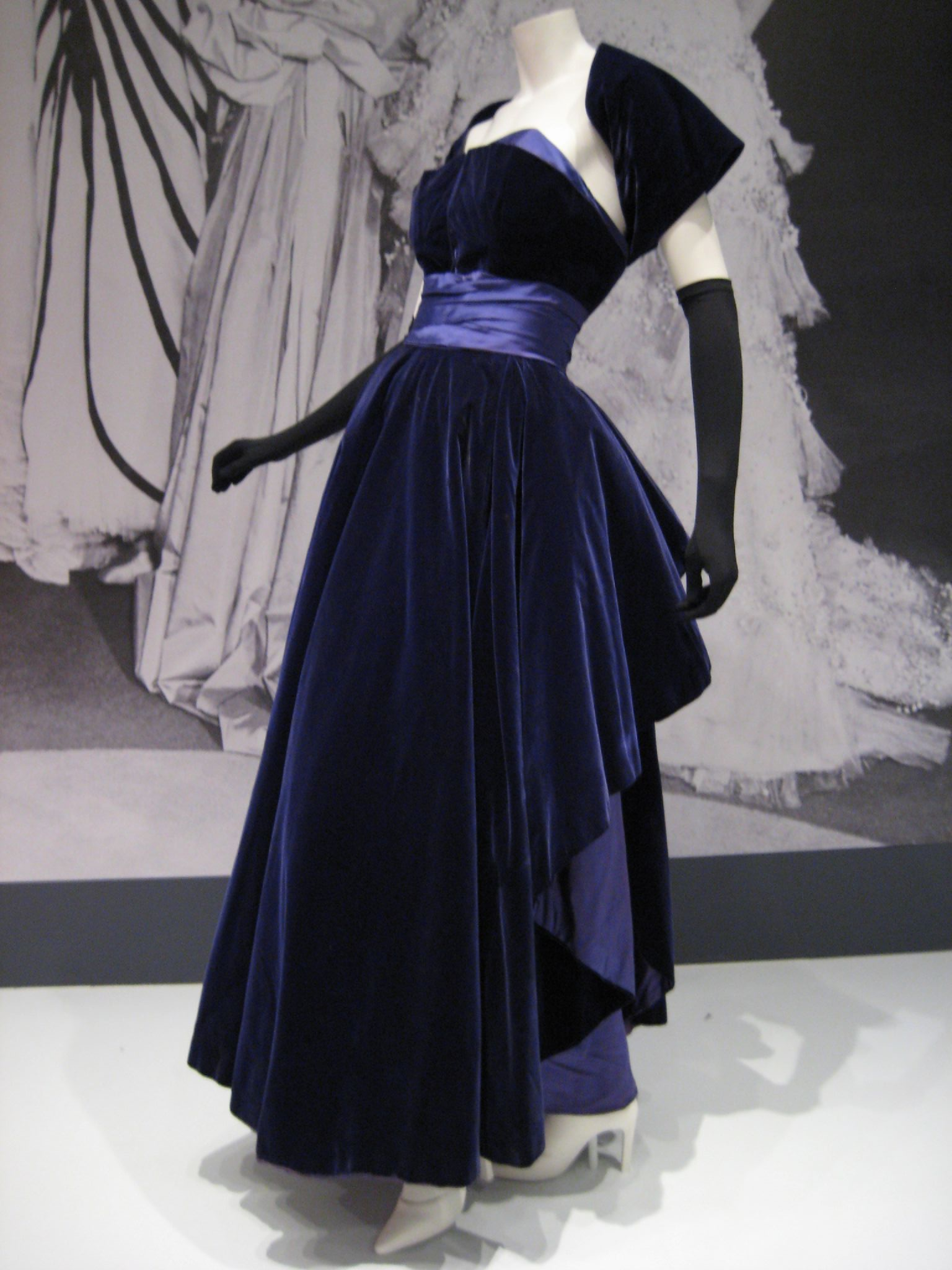
Christian Dior silk dress and evening gloves, presented at the Indianapolis Museum of Art.

The traditional clientele of the Fabrique, composed of elites willing to spend fortunes on evening and ceremonial clothing and home decoration, was in crisis in the 1930s and tended to disappear in the 1950s with the social changes occurring in developed countries. The wave of democratization and the influence of American culture delivered a definitive blow to orders for luxurious silk garments. Parisian fashion, the natural outlet and standard-bearer of Lyon's productions worldwide, is in severe crisis, with many haute couture houses closing and the remaining ones surviving only thanks to their ready-to-wear lines. (Note: Vernus 2006, p. 251)

In the upholstery fabric sector, the Tassinari & Chatel house still exists, now owned by the fabric publisher Lelièvre, which primarily works for luxury hotels, states, and very wealthy individuals; (Note: Angleraud & Pellissier 2003, p. 655) the Prelle Manufacturing, still family-owned for five generations; and the Velours Blafo house, the new name of Blanc Fontvieille & Cie since 1990, a French leader in technical velvet manufacturing and specializing in flat, plain, and Jacquard fabrics.

==== Haute couture turns away from silk ====
These houses are increasingly turning toward other materials. (Note: Vernus 2006, p. 294) The volumes of silk ordered have become low; as early as 1957, the textile industry in the Lyon area used only 800 tons of silk compared to more than 24,000 tons of artificial fibers. (Note: Angleraud & Pellissier 2003, p. 647) In 1992, silk fabric production had dropped to 375 tons. (Note: Vernus 2006, p. 317) Some houses try to specialize in luxury products but face many difficulties.

The historic Bonnet house chose this reorientation in the 1970s by separating from factories producing mid-range fabrics and acquiring companies with quality know-how. By the 1990s, it produced luxury items (clothing and scarves) under its own brand or for houses such as Dior, Chanel, Gianfranco Ferré, or Calvin Klein. The management also attempted to capitalize on the historical dimension of the company by founding a museum. However, the company remained fragile and shut down in 2001. (Note: Angleraud & Pellissier 2003, p. 650)

Bianchini-Férier and Bucol, which also worked for haute couture, managed to survive. Bucol (founded in 1928) survived by dedicating itself entirely to Haute nouveauté, thanks to a solid network within Parisian haute couture. (Note: Angleraud & Pellissier 2003, p. 651) In 1985, it partnered with Hubert de Givenchy for the production of "simple or shaped crepe, sculpted or satin-striped muslin, multicolored flowers scattered in seeds or large prints, coordinated with polka dots, stripes, or geometric patterns." The same house collaborated with several contemporary artists in the 1980s to create woven paintings. Yaacov Agam, Pierre Alechinsky, Paul Delvaux, Jean Dewasne, Hans Hartung, Friedensreich Hundertwasser, and Roberto Matta participated in this. Acquired by the Hermès group, Bucol produces its printed silk squares for them and also manufactures for Dior, Balmain, or Chanel. (Note: Angleraud & Pellissier 2003, p. 653)

==== Restoration and preservation of heritage ====
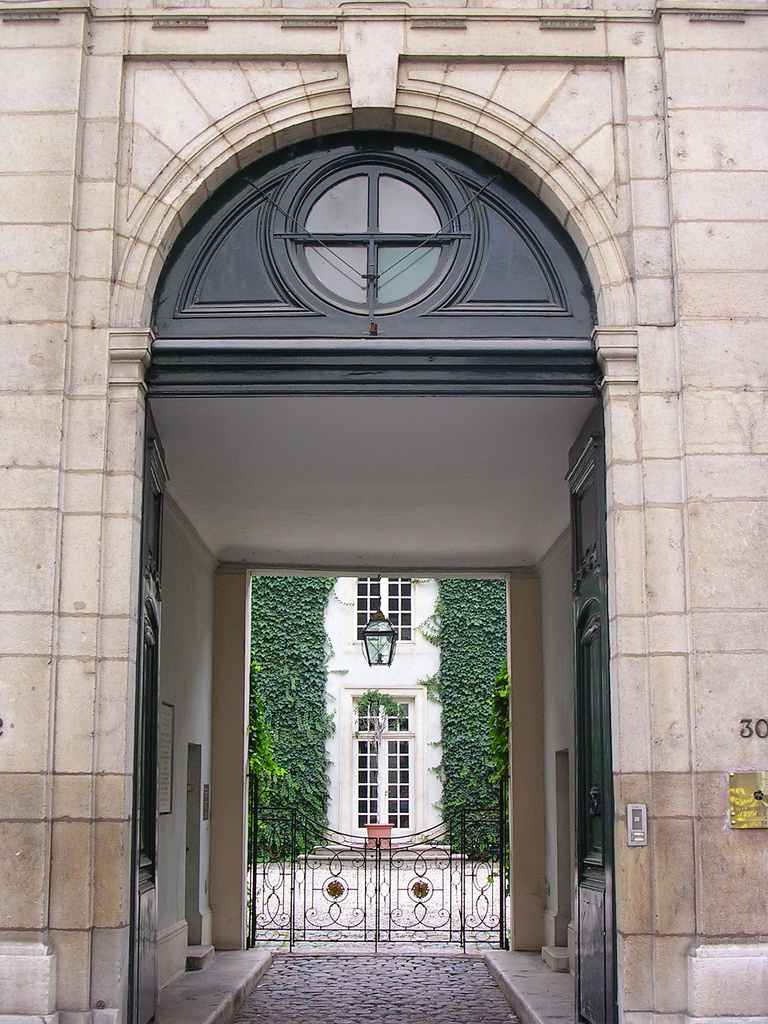
Entrance to the Musée des tissus et des arts décoratifs.

Early on, Lyon authorities sought to establish motif deposits. Initially, this was a practical endeavor, to enable property recognition, support the training of future designers, and provide inspiration for the houses. During the 19th century, this project took on a purely heritage and historical direction within the Musée des Tissus. This museum now hosts collections from the long history of Lyon's silk industry. Samples and designs kept by the labor tribunal were transferred to the museum in 1974 when the judicial body relocated.

The Musée des Tissus received a textile restoration workshop in 1985, partially funded by the French Ministry of Culture. Modeled after the Abegg Foundation workshop in Riggisberg, it specializes in restoring public or private pieces. It is also home to the International Center for the Study of Ancient Textiles, founded in 1954, which has over 500 members from 34 countries.

The Tassinari & Chatel and Prelle manufactures maintain the silk heritage for restoring period pieces. They benefited from the state's desire to carry out an extensive plan to restore the furnishings of royal castles in the 1960s and 1970s. This restoration work was combined with archaeological-type research by specialists from both companies to match colors, weavings, and patterns to the originals. This first project led them to work on restoration projects abroad. For example, the German government entrusted them with the restoration of several castles, including those of Brühl and Nymphenburg. (Note: Angleraud & Pellissier 2003, p. 654)

==== Technical textiles ====
Several companies left the silk industry to survive by entering the high-value-added technical textiles market. In 1987, the four main companies in the Lyon region in this sector were Porcher, Brochier, Hexel-Genin, and DMC. This strategy was somewhat successful. For example, the production of fiberglass fabric increased from 13,500 tons in 1981 to 30,000 tons in 1988.

== See also ==
- Textile industry

=== General articles ===
- History of silk
- History of Lyon
- Canut

=== Celebrities ===
- Prelle

=== Techniques and institutions ===
- Loom
- Jacquard machine
- Musée Gadagne
- Textile Arts Museum
