= Labia family =

Noble family of Venice

Labia
- Patrician family
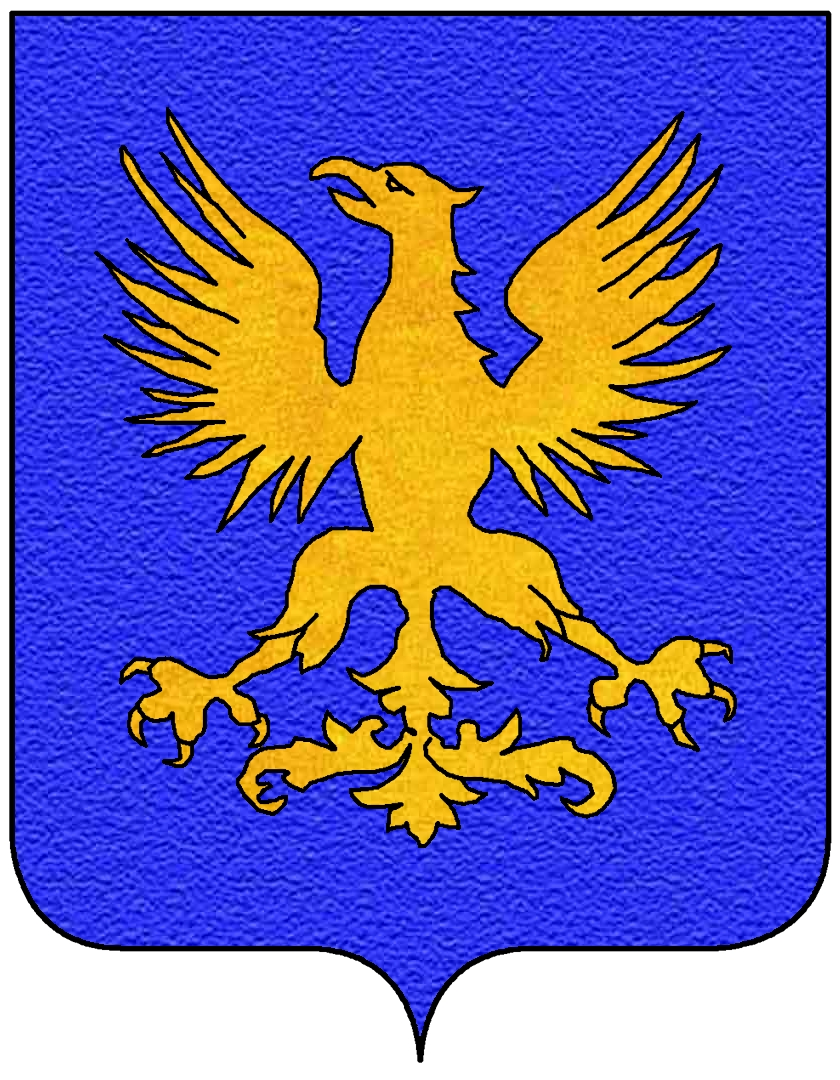
- Azure with an eagle in gold
- Country: Republic of Venice
- Place of origin: Catalonia
- Historic seat: Palazzo Labia
- Titles: Venetian Patriciate

The Labia family was a noble family of Venice. Originally merchants of Catalan origin, they bought their titles from the Venetian patriciate in the Venetian Republic in 1646. In the beginning of the 18th century the family built the Palazzo Labia on the Cannaregio Canal in Venice.

== History ==
Originally from Girona, the first family member to migrate, Niccolò, moved to Avignon in the mid-15th century, where he began devoting himself to the textile trade. With Pietro, they moved to Florence then to Venice, where they first attested, on 14 January 1509, when they purchased some real estate in Campo San Geremia.

To reward them for their merits to the Venetian Republic, under the dogate of Andrea Gritti, they were granted citizenshipde gratia. In 1548, they also received de intus et de extra, meaning they were Venetians "inside and outside".

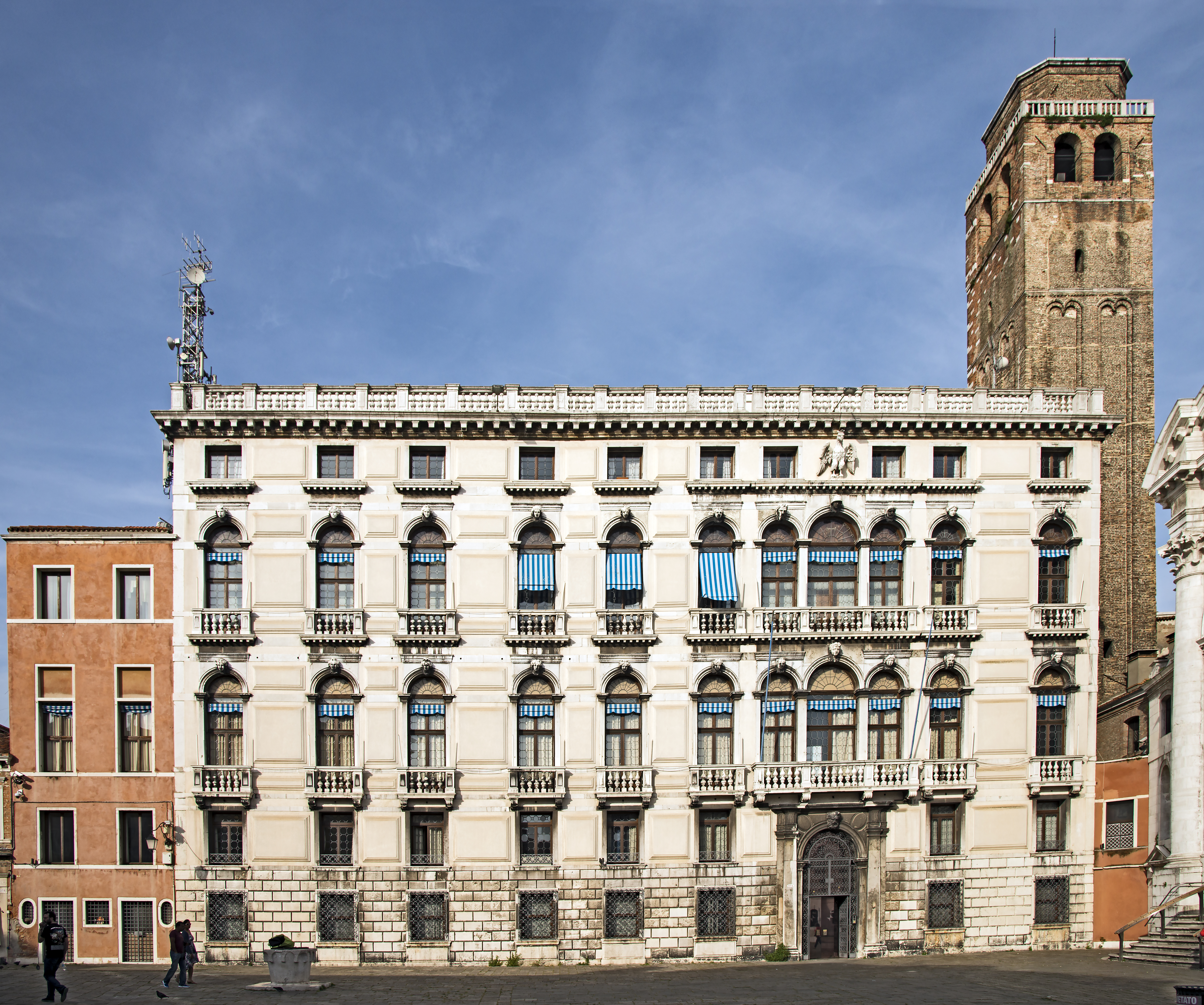
Palazzo Labia in Campo San Geremia

In 17th century, Venice, tested by the plague of 1630 and continuous clashes with the Ottoman Empire, decided to open the patriciate also to families of the bourgeoisie in return for the payment of 100,000 ducats. The Labia were the first to seize the opportunity in the form of Giovanni Francesco, who offered as much as 300,000 ducats, consequently entering the Libro d'Oro ("Golden Book") on 29 July 1646. During the same time, he acquired vast properties between Fratta Polesine and Villamarzana, for which in the latter, in 1649, he was appointed count (a title confirmed to his successors by decrees in 1702, 1730, and 1759).

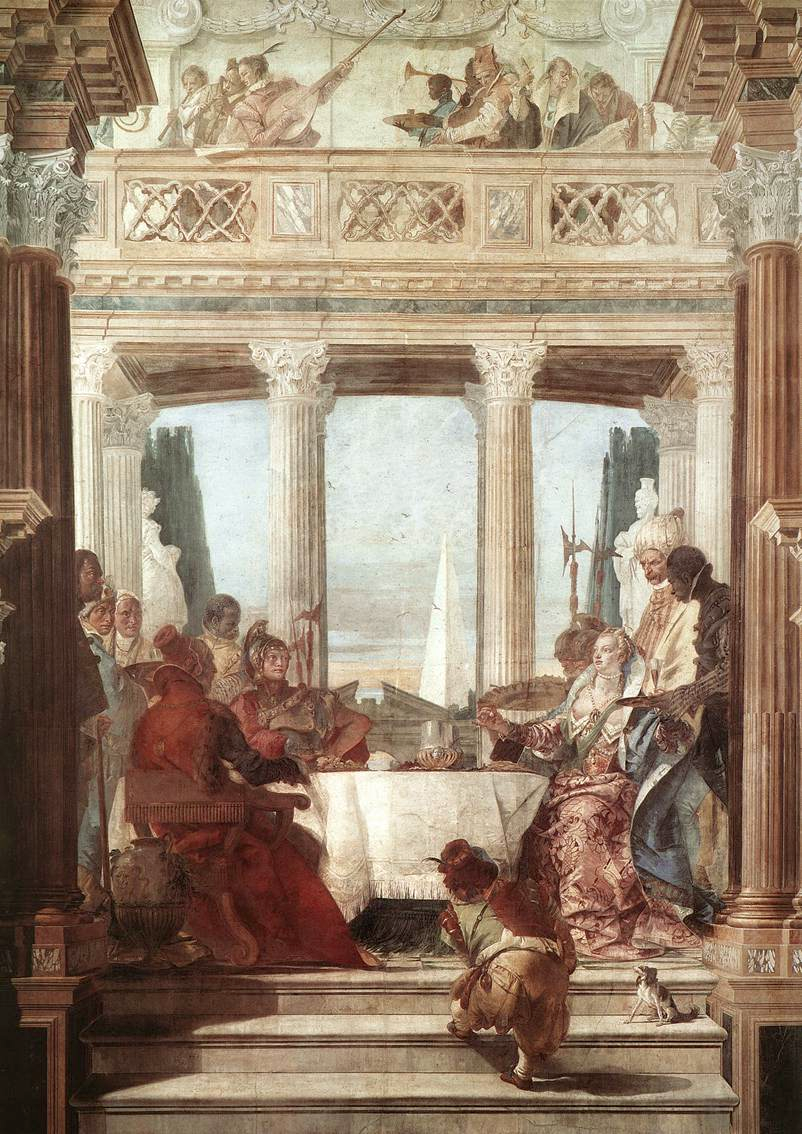
Tiepolo's fresco version for the ballroom of the Palazzo Labia, Venice (slightly trimmed)

The family was best known for the large palace overlooking the Grand Canal at San Geremia, built by Angelo Maria Labia and Paolo Antonio Labia from a design by Andrea Cominelli.

In more recent times, Fausta (1870–1935) and Maria Labia (1880–1953), daughters of Count Gianfrancesco, and Gianna Perea Labia (1908–1994), Fausta's daughter, have distinguished themselves as opera singers.

== Distinguished members ==
- Carlo Labia (c. 1624–1701), Catholic archbishop
- Pietro Labia (?-1692), priest, canon of Padua Cathedral
- Angelo Maria Labia (1709–1775), poet
- Fausta Labia (1870–1935), opera singer
- Maria Labia (1880–1953), opera singer

== Places and architecture ==
- Palazzo Labia, in Cannaregio;
- Palazzo Labia, in Postioma;
- Villa Labia, in Fratta Polesine;
- Villa Labia, now Carlesso, in Postioma;
- Villa Labia Tommasini, in Veggiano;
- Villa Labia, in Cologna Veneta

== Sources ==
- Italian Wikipedia, Labia; Accessed on 17 November, 2024
