= Carlos de Beistegui =

French-born Mexican multi-millionaire art collector and interior decorator

- Beistegui at Le Bal Oriental, 1951
- Born: Carlos de Beistegui e Iturbe; 31 January 1895; Paris, France
- Died: 17 January 1970 (aged 74); Biarritz, France
- Occupations: Businessman, art collector and interior decorator

Carlos de Beistegui e Yturbe (31 January 1895 – 17 January 1970), also known as Charlie de Beistegui, was an eccentric French-born Mexican multi-millionaire art collector, socialite and interior decorator who was one of the most flamboyant characters of mid-20th-century European life.

His ball at the Palazzo Labia in Venice in 1951 is still described as "the party of the century". Beistegui was often referred to as "The Count of Monte Cristo".

He is not to be confused with his namesake uncle (1863–1953), whose collection of notable 18th- and 19th-century paintings was donated to the Louvre.

== Early life ==
=== Family ===
Beistegui's origins are Spanish through his Mexican parents. He was born the heir to a huge Mexican fortune, to parents of Basque origin, his father was Juan Antonio de Beístegui and his mother Dolores de Yturbe, both of whose ancestors had migrated from Spain to Mexico in the 18th century. The family made its fortune there in silver, agriculture, and real estate but left Mexico after the execution of Emperor Maximilian in 1867. Beistegui was born in Paris and travelled under a Spanish diplomatic passport. He was brought up in France, Spain and England, and only ever visited Mexico twice, briefly. His family members held diplomatic posts representing Mexico in the U.K., France, Spain, and Russia.

=== Education ===
He was educated at Eton, where he wrote a volume of poetry he illustrated with his own drawings. Although he was expected to read History of art at Cambridge, the outbreak of World War I frustrated his application. He then joined his parents in their mansion on the esplanade of Les Invalides in Paris.

== Career ==
In the early 1930s, he had a penthouse built on the Champs-Élysées, designed by Le Corbusier. It included an electronically operated hedge that parted to reveal a view of the Arc de Triomphe, and a roof terrace designed by Salvador Dalí.

In 1939 he acquired the Château de Groussay, at Montfort-l'Amaury (Yvelines), and spent the next 30 years improving its interiors and grounds, and expanding the structure by adding extra wings. These included a 150-seat theatre, inspired by the Margravial Opera House in Bayreuth, one of the most beautiful extant theatres in Europe. He hired Emilio Terry to undertake the interior design. He had huge copies of the world's great paintings installed, but often claimed they were the originals (for example he claimed that Hans Holbein's portrait of Henry VIII owned by the British royal family was a fake, and his was the original.) He commissioned Spanish weavers to create tapestries in the style of Goya. He had giant Chinese jars which looked authentic but were actually made of tin or plaster. But he had an enormous number of genuine pieces, such as an ebony and bronze Louis XVI desk once owned by Paderewski. The furnishings were described as the greatest private interiors concocted in the 20th century. The house was admired by decorators such as David Nightingale Hicks and Mark Hampton, who called it the most beautiful house in the world. One of the rooms so impressed Cecil Beaton, that he used it as the model for Henry Higgins' library in My Fair Lady. The Château de Groussay was the scene of some of the grandest weekend parties of the 20th century. The gardens have been classified by the French government as one of the Remarkable Gardens of France.

Beistegui was not troubled by the Germans during their occupation of France, because he had a Spanish diplomatic passport, and was treated as a citizen of a neutral country.

He occasionally undertook commissions for others – salons in the Ministry of Foreign Affairs in Madrid, a suite of rooms at the Waldorf-Astoria Hotel in New York City, and the library at the British Embassy in Paris (with the designers Georges Geffroy and Emilio Terry) – but he used his artistic talents almost entirely for his own pleasure. Cecil Beaton wrote in his diary: "Beistegui is utterly ruthless. Such qualities as sympathy, pity or even gratitude are sadly lacking. He has become the most self-engrossed and pleasure-seeking person I have met."

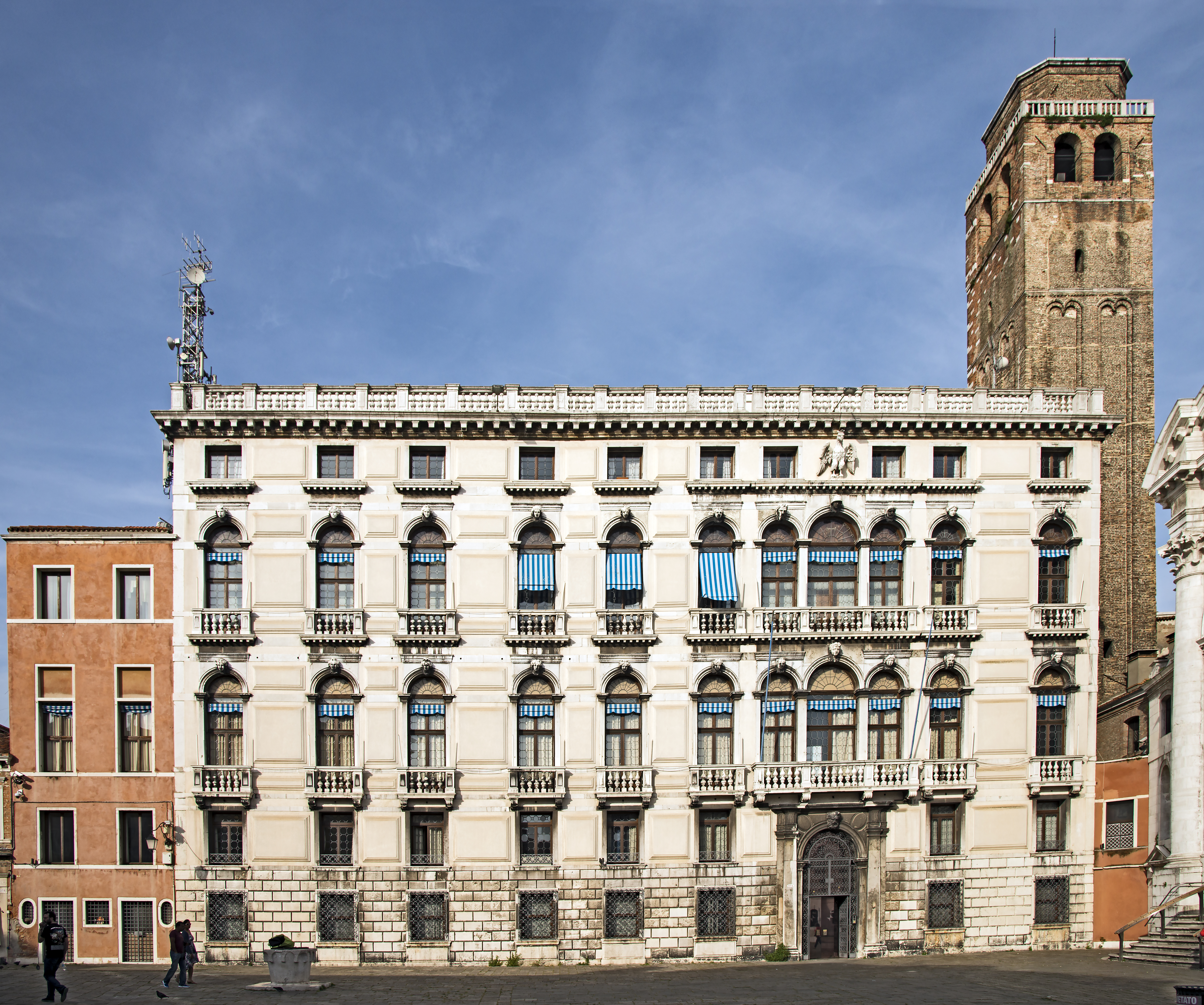
The Palazzo Labia on Campo San Geremia in Venice

In 1948, Beistegui acquired the Palazzo Labia, just off the Grand Canal in Venice, and began restoration efforts. He purchased furnishings that had been acquired from the palazzo's neighbours, and from the Duke of Northumberland bought eighteenth-century copies of frescoes by Raphael, Annibale Carracci, and Guido Reni. These works of art, coupled with newly acquired tapestries and antiques, restored the palazzo to its former splendour. So avid a collector was Don Carlos that his taste became known as "le goût Beistegui" (the Beistegui style).

== Le Bal du Siècle ==
On 3 September 1951, Beistegui held a masked costume ball, at the Palazzo Labia. It was one of the last truly spectacular events of a bygone era in that ballroom, and it was one of the largest and most lavish social events of the 20th century. The guest list included the Aga Khan III, Barbara Hutton, Gene Tierney, Jacqueline, Countess de Ribes, Jacques Fath, Count Armand de La Rochefoucauld, Duff and Lady Diana Cooper, Orson Welles, Daisy Fellowes, Paul-Louis Weiller, Cecil Beaton, Gala Dalí, Baron de Chabrol, Desmond Guinness, Alexis von Rosenberg, Baron de Redé, Prince and Princess Chavchavadze, Arturo Lopez-Willshaw, Patricia Lopez-Willshaw, Dimitri Hayek, Fulco di Verdura, Deborah Cavendish, Duchess of Devonshire, Princess Natalia Pavlovna Paley, Nelson Seabra, Aimée de Heeren, Princess Ghislaine de Polignac, Princess del Drago, Princess Gabrielle of Arenberg, Hélène Rochas, Princess Caetani, Princess Colonna, Prince Mathieu de Brancovan, the painters Fabrizio Clerici and Leonor Fini, and many others. Christian Dior and Salvador Dalí designed each other's costumes. Winston Churchill and the Duke and Duchess of Windsor were invited but did not attend. The host wore scarlet robes and a long curling wig, and his normal height (5 ft.6 in.) was raised a full 16'' inches by platform soles. Cecil Beaton's photographs of the ball are considered notable for capturing an almost surreal society, reminiscent of the Venetian life immediately before the fall of the republic at the end of the 18th century. The "party of the century" launched the career of Pierre Cardin, who designed about 30 of the costumes. Nina Ricci was another designer who was involved.

== Later life ==
Despite the high-profile guest list he was able to attract, Beistegui was generally quite cold to people, and they to him. He remained personally aloof and shadowy, and was often accused of treating his friends and mistresses very poorly. He never married, and although he was said to have had many mistresses, his sexuality was often the subject of speculation.

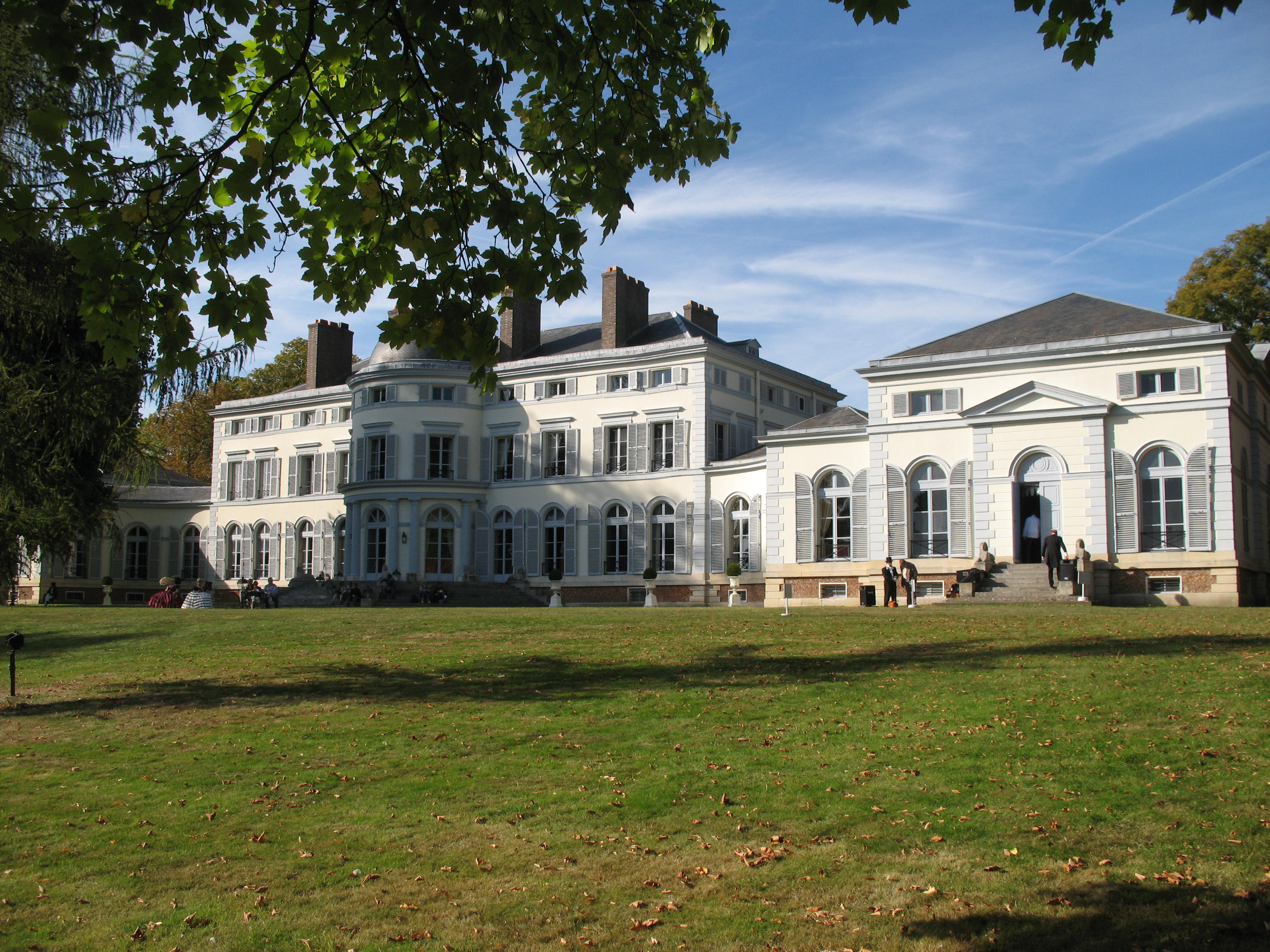
Montfort-l'Amaury : the Château de Groussay

After surviving a series of strokes around 1960, he sold the Palazzo Labia to RAI. Beistegui died in 1970, at 38 Avenue Maréchal Joffre in Biarritz, France, with a limited will. His estate went to his brother, who did not want the Château de Groussay and gave it to his son Juan (Johnny) de Beistegui. When the collection, which included many of the Palazzo Labia's former contents, was auctioned by Sotheby's (its first auction on French soil) in 1999, it proved to be France's largest and most highly priced auction sale, realising $26.5, million. The sale was described as "a major event in the history and sociology of the decorative arts".

A documentary Don Carlos de Beistegui was made in 1989.

== Bibliography ==
- Thomas Pennequin, Charles de Beistegui: Le prince des esthètes, Tallandier, 2023 (ISBN 9791021046719)
- Cecil Beaton, The Glass of Fashion, Weidenfeld & Nicolson, London, 1954, et 2e ed. Cassell, London, 1954. Translated in French by Denise Bourdet under the title : Cinquante ans d'élégances et d'art de vivre, preface by Christian Dior, Amiot-Dumont, Paris, 1954
- Nicholas Foulkes, BALS: Legendary Costume Balls of the Twentieth Century, Assouline, New York, 2011 (ISBN 9781614280002)
- Jean-Louis de Faucigny-Lucinge, Fêtes mémorables, bals costumés,1922–1972, Herscher, Paris, 1986 (ISBN 2733501194)
- Patrick Mauriès, Alexandre Serebriakoff, portraitiste d'intérieurs, Franco Maria Ricci (FMR), 1990 (ISBN 978-8821620386)
- Paul Morand, Venises, Gallimard, 1971
- Jean-Louis Remilleux, Groussay. Château, fabriques et familiers de Charles de Beistegui, Albin Michel, 2007 (ISBN 2226152237 et ISBN 978-2-226-15223-7)
- Maurice Rheims, Haute Curiosité, Robert Laffont, Paris, 1975 (ISBN 2221062949)
- José Luis de Vilallonga, Gold Gotha, Seuil, Paris, 1972 (ISBN 9782020021036)
