= Alexis von Rosenberg, Baron de Redé =

French socialite

Alexis von Rosenberg-Redé, Baron von Rosenberg-Redé
- Redé in the middle at his Bal oriental in 1969. Photo by Patrick Anson, 5th Earl of Lichfield.
- Born: 4 February 1922; Zurich, Switzerland
- Died: 8 July 2004 (aged 82); Paris, France
- Education: Institut Le Rosey
- Occupations: Banker, art collector, socialite
- Known for: Restoration of the Hôtel Lambert, Bal de Oriental 1969
- Partner: Arturo Lopez-Willshaw (1941-1962)

Oskar Dieter Alex von Rosenberg-Redé, 3rd Baron von Rosenberg-Redé (4 February 1922 – 8 July 2004), also known as Alexis, Baron de Redé, was a prominent French banker, aristocrat, aesthete, collector, and socialite. In 2003, he was appointed a commandeur of the Ordre des Arts et des Lettres for his restoration of the Hôtel Lambert, where he was known for hosting opulent costume balls. Involved in horse racing, in 1972 he won the Prix de Diane and came in second at the Prix de l'Arc de Triomphe.

== Early life and education ==
Oskar Dieter Alex von Rosenberg-Redé was born in Zurich, Switzerland on 4 February 1922, the third and youngest child of Oskar Adolf Rosenberg, Baron von Rosenberg-Redé (1878–1939), a banker from Austria-Hungary. His father – whose mother was Hungarian and father unknown – had been adopted by a banker named Rosenberg and made a citizen of Liechtenstein, then created a baron in the Hungarian nobility by the Emperor of Austria in 1916. Redé's mother was Edith von Kaulla (1890—1931), a member of an ennobled German Jewish family that had been part-owners of the Royal Württemberg Court Bank (″Königlich Württembergische Hofbank″, founded by Karoline Kaulla and Raphael Kaulla). He had two siblings. Born in 1919, his brother Hubert von Rosenberg-Redé was the heir to the barony, while his sister Marion von Rosenberg-Redé (born 1916) was handicapped.

The children were brought up Protestant and raised in a 16-room hotel suite at the Dolder Grand Hotel in Zurich, attended by a great many maids, nannies, porters, and valets. Their father visited occasionally. As their finances decreased with the onset of World War II, they moved into a two-bedroom suite. Diagnosed with leukemia, their mother died in 1931, when Redé was nine years old. Redé and his brother were then sent to be educated together at Institut Le Rosey in Switzerland.

On account of bankruptcy, his father committed suicide in 1939 at the family's estate (Villa Rosin) in the Austrian town of Kaumberg. Living on an insurance policy income of $200 a month, Redé moved to New York City, where he briefly attempted to acquire American citizenship. He traveled to California to work for an antique dealer, where he earned money to support his sister and befriended Elsie de Wolfe (known as Lady Mendl), as well as Salvador and Gala Dalí. He returned in New York in 1941. His brother committed suicide in 1942 in Hollywood, California, whereupon Redé became the third and last Baron von Rosenberg-Redé, which was typically abbreviated as Baron de Redé in France.

== Career and later life ==
=== Entry into Parisian society ===
In a New York restaurant, the 19-year-old Redé caught the eye of businessman Arturo López Willshaw and they became lovers in 1941. A married Chilean millionaire, Lopez-Willshaw (1900–62) lived with his wife Patricia Lopez Huici in a lavishly decorated house in Neuilly, France and was "famous for his extravagant costume entertainments." Shortly after they became a couple, Lopez-Wilshaw allegedly offered Redé $1 million to return with him to France, with Redé initially demurring.

Upon Lopez-Willshaw's urging, in 1946 Redé moved to Paris in the entourage of Lady Mendl, an interior decorator returning to Versailles from California. Lopez-Willshaw's wife, a first cousin born Patricia Lopez-Huici, was cool towards her husband's companion, though the three often attended social events as a group and traveled together, moving between suites in European and American hotels, the house in Neuilly, a yacht (Gaviota IV), and an apartment in California. The Lopez-Wilshaws and Redé also took up organizing lavish costume balls together.

=== Role as aesthete and host ===
Redé was a committed aesthete. In 1949, he moved into the ground floor of the 17th century Hôtel Lambert on the Île Saint-Louis in Paris and restored the building and its décor. He was influenced by such interior decorators as Georges Geffroy and Victor Grandpierre. Redé had become an "important influence in Paris society" by the early 1950s with his luncheons and dinners at the Hotel Lambert, which were known for their decor, luxury, and food. Well-known in Parisian high-society, Nancy Mitford called him "La Pompadour de nos jours." Redé was described as "the Eugène de Rastignac of modern Paris" by Sir Henry 'Chips' Channon and as "the best host in all Europe"; his parties were the center of le tout-Paris. Philippe Jullian described the world of Lopez-Willshaw and Redé as akin to a small 18th-century court. Members of the circle included the poet and patron of the Surrealists, Marie-Laure de Noailles (1902–70); musicians such as Henri Sauguet, Georges Auric, and Francis Poulenc; and the artist Christian Bérard.

A number of his events attracted particular note, and involved designers that would later go on to become well known. Nina Ricci designed the costumes of Redé and the Lopez-Willshaws for the famous 1951 Bal oriental given by Carlos de Beistegui at his Venetian palace, the Palazzo Labia. In 1956, at Redé's Bal des Têtes, the young Yves Saint Laurent provided many of the headdresses—the Duchess of Windsor being one of the judges—and received a boost to his career. In 1964, Redé was included on the first annual list put out by the National Society of Interior Designers for "individuals who have inspired good design". An event Redé threw at the Hotel Lambert, the Oriental Ball (Bal oriental) in December 1969, saw the hotel turned into a lavish fantasy and has been called an "apotheosis" of Redé's parties. 400 guests were invited. When Diana Vreeland heard of the plans for the event, she promptly contacted Redé and expressed her interest in having the event photographed for Vogue. The guest list was the crème de la crème of international high society.

=== Business and later years ===
As his partner, Redé was closely involved with managing Lopez-Willshaw's financial affairs, which he did "adroitly." In 1962, when Arturo Lopez-Willshaw died, Redé inherited half of his fortune. To manage it, he joined Prince Rupert Loewenstein in taking control of Leopold Joseph & Sons, a bank where he served as the deputy chairman. With Loewenstein, Redé was closely involved in managing the money of the Rolling Stones. Redé was also a founder of Artemis, an investment fund specializing in the purchase of fine art. After Lopez-Wilshaw's death, Redé remained involved in art collection. He frequented dealers of art such as Jacques Kugel and Nicolas Landau, and had a great interest in the 17th and 18th centuries. He also continued hosting events. Forging a friendship with Marie-Hélène de Rothschild, the two worked together to throw a great many balls at the Rothschild Château de Ferrières, east of Paris.

In 1971, he was included on The New York Times best-dressed list. In 1972, Redé had his portrait painted by the fashionable painter Anthony Christian, and he was named in the International Best Dressed List Hall of Fame. Also in 1972, Redé won the Prix de Diane horse race, and the same year he came in second at the Prix de l'Arc de Triomphe.

In 1975, Redé persuaded his close friends, Marie-Hélène de Rothschild and her husband Baron Guy de Rothschild, to purchase the Hôtel Lambert. Redé kept his apartments in the building, and they shared the house for the rest of his life, with the Rothschilds henceforth using it as their Paris residence. He and the Rothschilds remained close, and all three went on vacations together. Redé was inseparable from Marie-Hélène until she died in 1996. Redé afterwards spent much of his time with Charlotte Aillaud, sister of Juliette Gréco. In 2003, he was appointed a commandeur of the Ordre des Arts et des Lettres for his restoration of the Hôtel Lambert. He continued to entertain at the Lambert until 2004.

== Personal life ==
By his own account, Redé was largely uninterested in affection or sex, and had only ever loved a Polish classmate at Le Rosey, an interest he never acted on. Redé was romantically involved with Arturo Lopez-Willshaw (1900 - 1962), a married businessman, from 1941 until Lopez-Wilshaw's death in 1962. Upon meeting Lopez-Wilshaw, Redé recollected losing his virginity to the man at the "sleazy" hotel Winslow on East 55th Street. As Redé recalled of the beginning of the relationship, "I was not in love. But I needed protection, and I was aware that he could provide this." In addition, he observed, "The money gave me the security I craved, and it would also enable me to look after my handicapped sister." After their move to Paris, Lopez-Wilshaw unofficially lived with Redé at the Hôtel Lambert while maintaining a formal residence with his wife in Neuilly.

With his wealth deriving from his lover, Redé's social notoriety rested on being a kept man. In 1953, author Christian Mégret published Danaé, a popular roman à clef based on Redé's and Lopez-Willshaw's life together. The racy details were provided by one of their close friends and Mégret's companion, Princess Ghislaine de Polignac. Lopez-Willshaw promptly banned Polignac from his home, although Redé later relented and became friends again.

Redé maintained his apartment at the Hotel Lambert throughout his later years, remaining an active host. He died suddenly at the home of a friend, Carmen Saint, at the age of 82, of heart issues. A mass was held at Saint Louis en L'Isle on July 13, at the church near the Hotel Lambert. He was interred in a crypt at Pere Lachaise near the tomb of Arturo Lopez-Willshaw. A larger memorial was held in September. Redé's estate, notably the contents of his apartment at the Hôtel Lambert, was auctioned after his death by Sotheby's and realized £5.2 million. His memoirs, Alexis: The Memoirs of the Baron de Redé, were published posthumously in 2005. Hugo Vickers was its editor and ghostwriter.
