= Labium =

Labium is the Latin word for lip. In English, it may refer to:

- Labium (botany), a modified petal in certain monocot flowers, which attracts insects for pollination
- Labium (arthropod mouthpart), a mouthpart of arthropods (the lower "lip")
- Labium (wasp), a genus of wasps in the subfamily Labeninae of the family Ichneumonidae
- Labium (wind instrument), a part of wind instruments, such as the flue pipe or the recorder; see Recorder (musical instrument) § Basic sound production

Labia is the plural of labium. It may refer to:

- Labia, a part of the vulva
- Labia (earwig), a genus of earwigs in the family Labiidae
- Fausta Labia (1870–1935), Italian operatic soprano
- Maria Labia (1880–1912), Italian operatic soprano, sister of Fausta
- Labia family, a noble family of Venice

== See also ==
- Labial (disambiguation)
- Labrum (disambiguation)
