= Christian Mégret =

French journalist and writer (1904–1987)

Christian Mégret (French pronunciation: [kʁistjɑ̃ meɡʁɛ]; 11 November 1904, Vincennes – 1987), was a 20th-century French journalist and novelist, winner of the Prix Femina in 1957.

== Life ==
Christian Mégret began his career as a colonial administrator in Togo, which inspired his first novel Anthropophages ('Cannibals') which appeared in 1934. He became a journalist at Jour in 1933 and then at Carrefour in 1945. He led a parallel career as a novelist, and in 1957 was awarded the Prix Femina for his work Le Carrefour des solitudes. His lovers included Princess Ghislaine de Polignac, whose intimate knowledge of the relationship of Baron de Redé and Arturo Lopez enabled Mégret to pen Danaë, a roman à clef based on the pair.

== Works ==
- Anthropophages, éditions Or (1934)
- Ils sont déjà des hommes, Librairie Fayard Arthème (1938)
- Les Fausses Compagnies, Plon (1939)
- Jacques, Plon (1941)
- L'Absent, Plon (1946)
- Carte forcée, Plon (1947)
- C'était écrit, Plon (1948)
- Danaë, Editions Robert Laffont (1953)
- Le Carrefour des solitudes, Editions René Julliard (1957)
- Haïssable moi, Grasset (1963)
- Les Chimères bleues de Chandernagor, Robert Laffont (1964)
- Un agent double, Gallimard (1967)
- J'ai perdu mon ombre, Denoë (1974)
- La Croix du sud, Beetle editions (1984)
- Les Liens du sang, Vertigo editions (1985)
