= Labra =

Labra may refer to:

- Labra (Cangas de Onís), a civil parish in Asturias, Spain
- Labra (village), in the territory subject to a dispute between Georgia and Abkhazia
- Labra (Bonaire), an abandoned village
- Labra (surname)

== See also ==
- Labrum (disambiguation) (Latin for "lip"; plural "labra")
