= Andrea Cominelli =

Italian sculptor

- Born: Venice, Venetian Republic
- Occupation: Architect
- Known for: Palazzo Labia facade

Andrea Cominelli was an Italian stonemason, sculptor and architect, who was active in the Republic of Venice during the second half of the 17th century.

== Early years ==
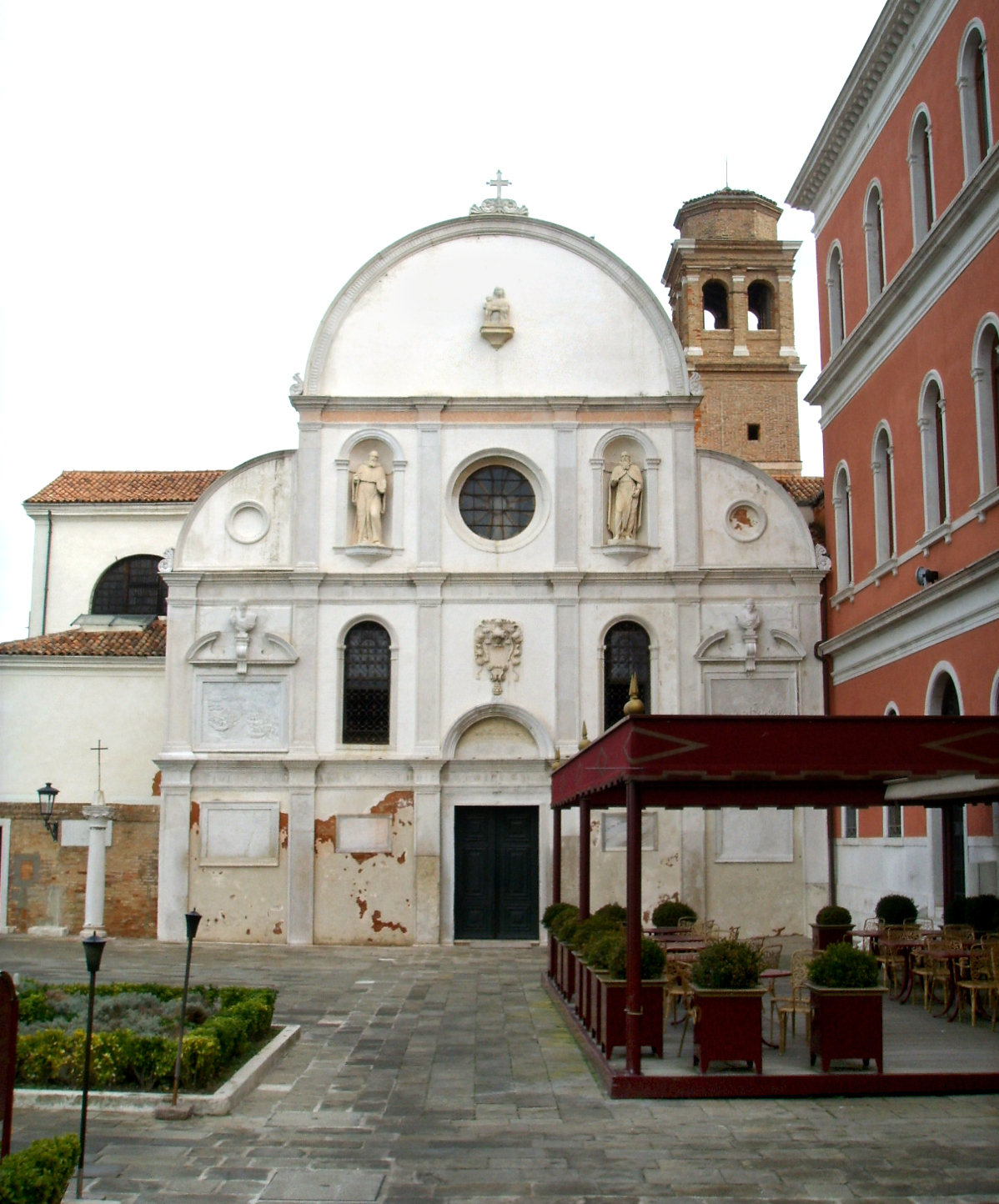
Facade of the Church of San Clemente

Little is known of Cominelli's youth. He was probably born in Venice in the first half of the 17th century into a family from Bergamo.

In 1652 Francesco and Tommaso Morosini commissioned Cominelli to restore the facade of the Church of San Clemente on the Isola di San Clemente. He included busts of Morosini family members above the portal, and their coat of arms. He also added statues of Saint Benedict and Saint Romuald, and a Madonna and cherub. The facade includes reliefs of scenes from battles commemorating the Morosini's victories in the war against the Turks. He is thought to have himself made the sculptures of the two brothers Morosini and of the two saints.

== Carmelite convent ==
Cominelli is recorded on a bill of payment dated 4 April 1653 for implementation of an altar in the church of the new Venetian convent of the Carmelites of St. Theresa. He was engaged in this work until the end of 1654. He supervised construction of the convent and church of San Palo between 1682 and 1683, said by Brandolese in 1795 to have "some elegance, that would be greater if it were not encrusted with stucco". In 1679 he was in charge of the arrangement of the organ, with the work done by Eugenio Gasparini. On 7 April 1682 he signed an agreement for the partial reconstruction and beautification of the altar of the Blessed Virgin of Carmel. The church and convent of St. Teresa were built by Cominelli for the Sisters of Saint Theresa and consecrated in 1688. The church has a tall, square and simple design.

== Other work ==
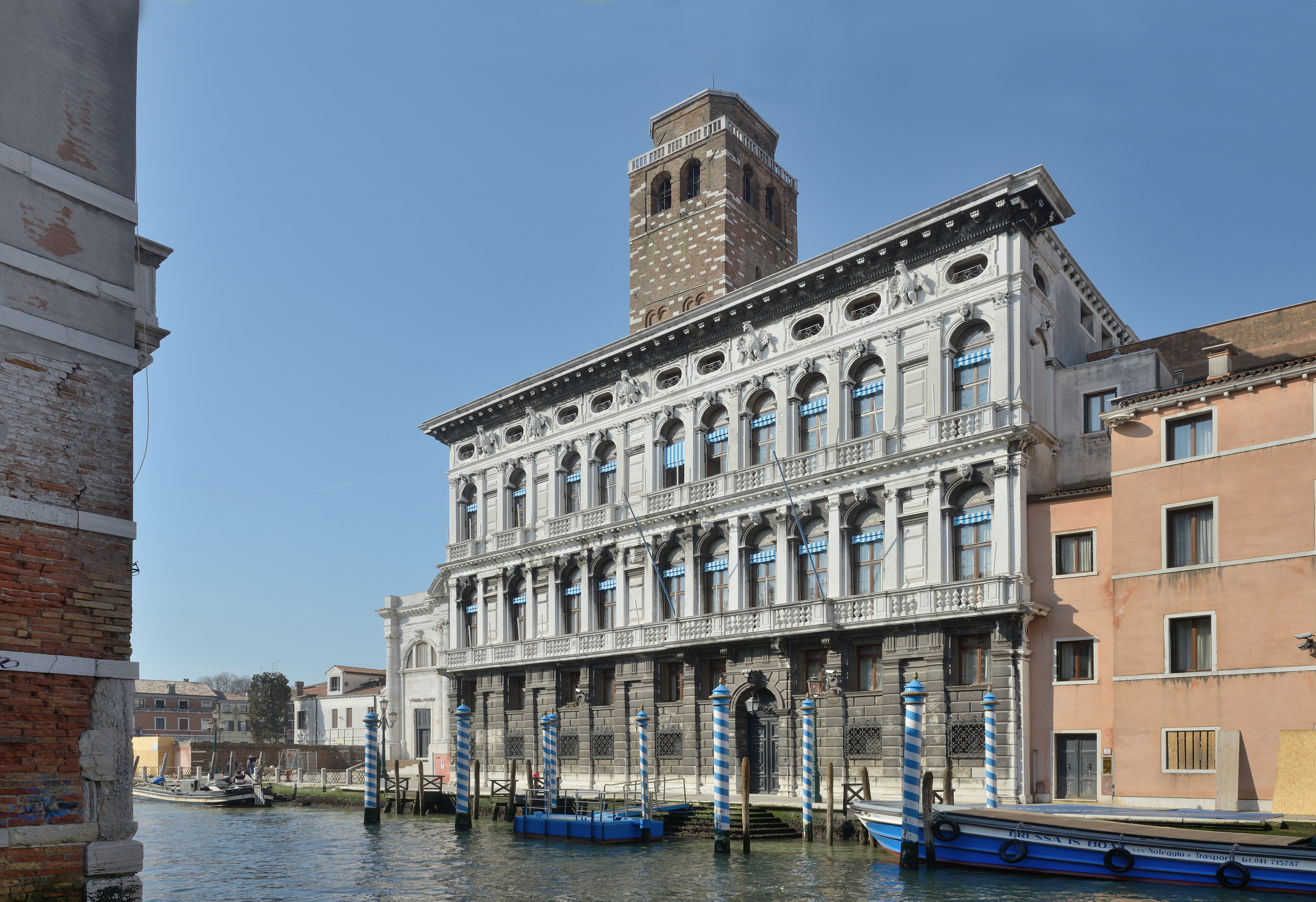
The Palazzo Labia in Venice on the Cannaregio canal

While working almost continuously for the Carmelites, Cominelli undertook other works. He made the altar of Baldassarre Longhena's St. Mary the Virgin in 1674-1677. He participated in the competition for design of the "Dogana da Mar" customs house (1676-1677). There are no records of activity after 1688. However, he was credited with the design of the Palazzo Labia, built for private clients. Cominelli designed the water facades of the building. The building was completed in 1696. Later the ballroom was decorated by the perspective artist Gerolamo Mengozzi Colonna and the fresco painter Giovanni Battista Tiepolo. The paintings tell the story of Anthony and Cleopatra. In the mid-18th century Alessandro Tremignon designed the campo facade of the palace.

== Sources ==
- Concina, Ennio (1982). Dizionario Biografico degli Italiani. Vol. 27. Treccani.
- Cotton, Jeff (2013). "Dorsoduro: Santa Teresa". The Churches of Venice.
- Garrett, Martin (2001). Venice: A Cultural and Literary Companion. Signal Books. ISBN 978-1-902669-29-8.
- "Labia a San Geremia Palace". J.-Ch. Rößler.
- "San Clemente Church". San Clemente Palace Hotel & Resort. Permak Investments. Archived from the original on 2013-12-03.
- Touring club italiano (1985). Venezia. Touring Editore. ISBN 978-88-365-0006-2.
