= Palazzo Labia =

Baroque palace in Venice, Italy

Coordinates: 45.44306°N 12.32494°E

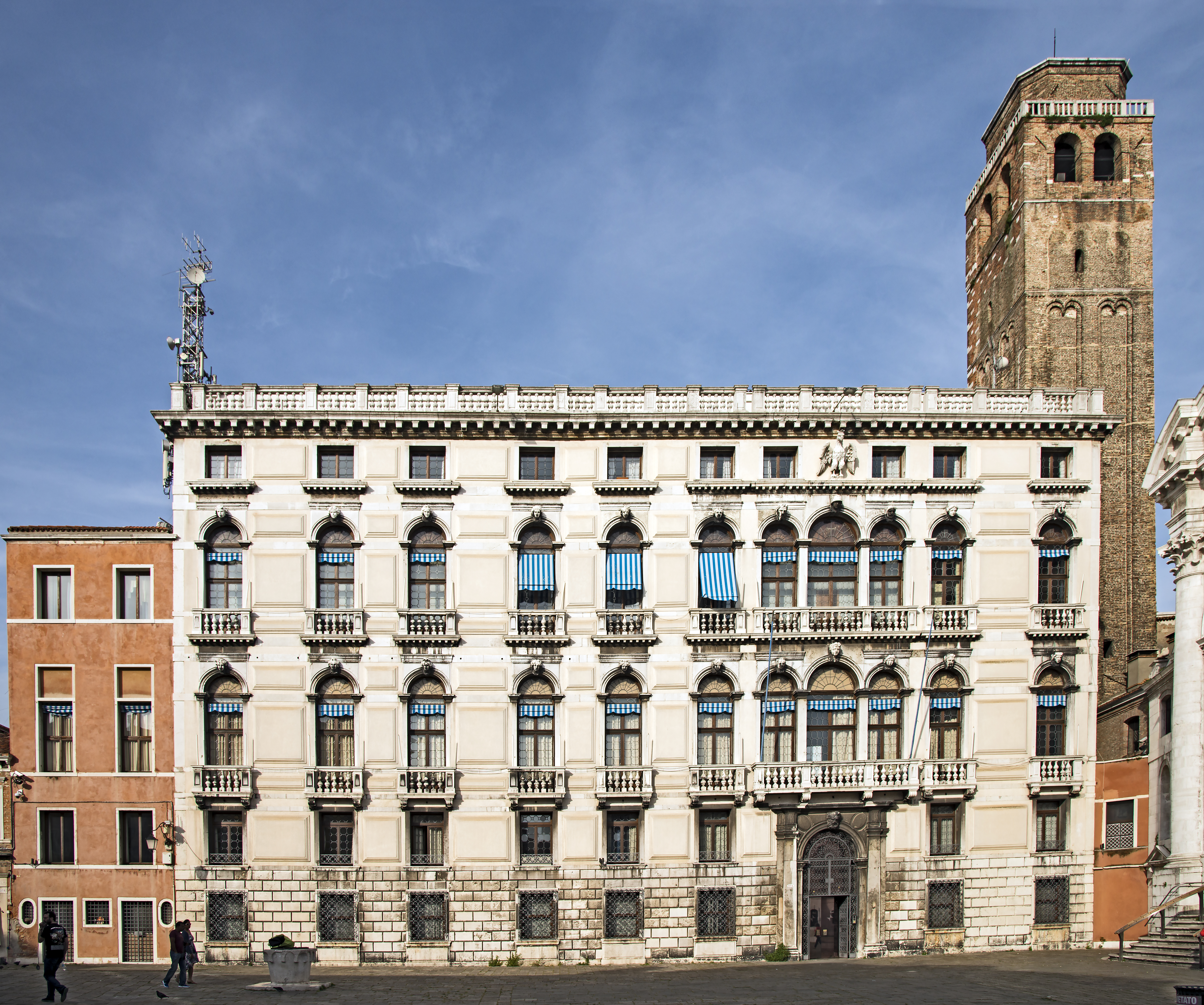
Palazzo Labia facade Campo San Geremia

Palazzo Labia is a baroque palace in Venice, Italy. Built in the 17th and 18th centuries, it is one of the last great palazzi of Venice. Alought little known outside of Italy, it is most notable for the remarkable frescoed ballroom painted 1746–47 by Giovanni Battista Tiepolo, with decorative works in trompe-l'œil by Gerolamo Mengozzi-Colonna.

In a city often likened to a cardboard film set, the Palazzo is unusual by having not only a formal front along the Grand Canal, but also a visible and formal facade at its rear, and decorated side as well, along the Cannaregio Canal. In Venice, such design is very rare. The palazzo was designed by the architect Andrea Cominelli (by Alessandro Tremignon according to others). The principal facade is on the Cannaregio Canal while a lesser three bayed facade faces the Grand Canal. A later facade probably designed by Giorgio Massari is approached from the Campo San Geremia.

== The Labia ==
The Labia family, who commissioned the palazzo, were originally Catalan and bought their way into nobility in 1646, hence considered arriviste by the old Venetian aristocracy. The wars with the Ottoman Empire had depleted the coffers of the Republic of Venice which then sold inscriptions into nobility, thus giving political clout. It has been said that they compensated for their lack of ancestors by a great display of wealth. Today the Palazzo Labia is the sole remaining example of this ostentation.

It is the members of the Labia family of the mid 18th century to whom the palazzo owes its notability today, it was inhabited by two brothers with their wives, children, and mother. The brothers Angelo Maria Labia and Paolo Antonio Labia employed Tiepolo at the height of his powers to decorate the ballroom. Employing Tiepolo seems to have been the most remarkable thing the brothers ever achieved. Angelo Maria became an Abbé, merely in order to escape the political obligations of an aristocrat of the Republic. Curiously his holy employment did not prevent him marrying. His wife however was a commoner, which indicates an almost morganatic status to the marriage. Angelo's chief interests were constructing a marionette theatre, which concealed real singers behind its scenes. The marionettes often performed satirical plays which Angelo wrote himself. In later life he failed to endear himself to Venetian society by becoming an informer to the dreaded inquisition. His younger brother Paolo, married conventionally into the old Venetian aristocracy, a class prepared to accept the Labia's money and hospitality if not equality. Paolo too never assumed any public duties. It appears that it was their mother, Maria Labia, who was the intellectual driving force of the family, in her youth a great beauty, she was painted by Rosalba Carriera. The French traveller and social commentator Charles de Brosses reported that in old age she had a lively wit, flirtatious nature, and possessed the finest collection of jewels in Europe. This collection was also portrayed in some of Tiepolo's work in the palazzo.

== Design ==
Palazzo Labia. The Grand Canal facade to the right of the campanile, on the junction of the Cannaregio and Grand Canal Painted by Sargent

While the palazzo was begun at the very end of the 17th century it can be considered a product of the 18th century when such architects as Baldassarre Longhena had previously dominated the palazzo architecture of the city in a style exemplified by dramatic facades, rich in moulding with detached columns—a style little changed since the late renaissance.

Two little-known architects, Tremignon and Cominelli, were commissioned to design the palazzo. The selection of two comparatively unknown architects is strange, considering the desire of the Labia family to make an impression on Venetian society. However, the placement of the site more than compensated for any risk involved in the selection of unknown architects. The site chosen for the palazzo was the junction of the Cannaregio Canal and the Grand Canal in the parish of San Geremia, in fact the church of San Geremia was the palazzo's immediate neighbour, its campanile seemingly incorporated into the palazzo. The Cannaregio Canal is one of the most important tributaries of the Grand Canal.

While like many of the other larger palazzi in Venice the Palazzo Labia is rectangular in design built around an inner courtyard, the two architects Tremignon and Cominelli broke the architectural traditions of such architects as Longhena, by designing the facades of the Palazzo Labia to be more simple and less cluttered, than those of the earlier Venetian classical palazzi, while still maintaining a baroque richness achieved through the effect of light and shadow, a second break with Venetian architectural tradition was that the new palazzo had three facades, it was common practice in Venice for only the waterfront facade to have a richness of detail, while the rear elevations were often an evolved mismatch of asymmetrical windows and styles. The new palazzo's site being at the junction of two canals, and also bordering the Campo San Geremia provided the opportunity for three facades. Hence this attention to detail of the less obvious parts of the palazzo's exterior, away from its principal water front facade, was able to provide further evidence of the Labia's vast wealth.

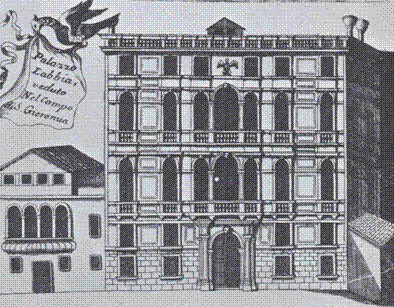
Palazzo Labia. Alessandro Tremignon's facade facing the Campo San Geremia. Portrayed here in the 18th century it was later extended.

The facade facing the Campo San Geremia is of equal splendour to that on the Cannaregio. The Grand Canal facade is the smaller of the three, set back from the fondamenta itself and of only three bays. The palazzo is of five floors. The ground and first floors are both low, the first being rusticated, the next two floors the piano nobile and the secondo piano, have tall segmented windows separated by pilasters, the tall windows are fenced by balustraded balconettes. The fifth floor is a low mezzanine beneath the projecting hipped roof, here the small oval windows are divided by the heraldic eagles of the Labia family. The facade on the Campo San Geremia designed by Tremignon which hints at the more floral Venetian Gothic style contrasts to the more classical canal facades. However the Venetian Gothic is more of a subtle suggestion than defining style, the typical central recessed loggias of the piano nobili, typical features of the Venetian Gothic, are however glazed, and the roof line, unlike on the water fronts, is concealed by classical balustrading, but the repetition and placing of the fenestration continues the theme of the canal facades.

== Interior ==
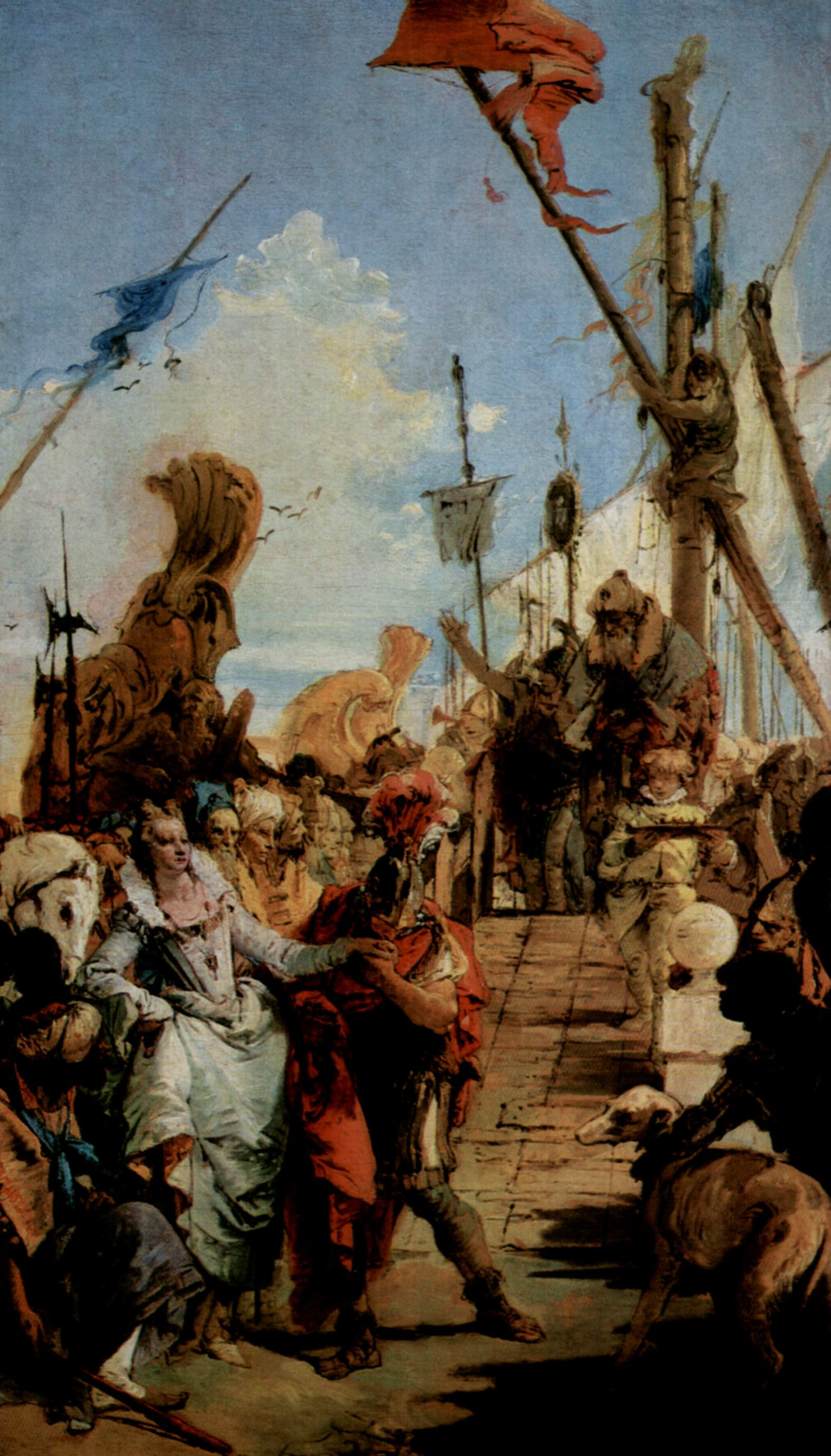
Palazzo Labia. Tiepolo's Meeting of Marc Antony and Cleopatra.

The double height palazzo ballroom (or Salone delle Feste) is entirely frescoed with scenes from the romantic encounters of Marcus Antonius and Cleopatra. These frescoes were a collaboration between Tiepolo and Girolamo Mengozzi Colonna. The frescos are framed by architectural elements in trompe-l'œil, featuring doorways, windows, and balconies. Through the illusionary elements we view the encounter of Anthony and the Egyptian queen at a banquet, while from the painted balconies and upper windows members of Cleopatra's court seem to look down. It is thought that the models for these figures were members of the Labia household. In the scene, Cleopatra dissolves her priceless pearl in a goblet of wine, demonstrating to Anthony her wealth; Maria Labia would have seen this as a metaphor to her nouveau riche position in Venetian society. It is said Maria Labia herself was the model for Cleopatra, but no documentary evidence supports the claim.

While Tiepolo's frescoes in the ballroom are among his finest in Italy, they also display Tiepolo's shortcomings as an artist. He was totally uninterested in psychology; as a result of this, a debate continues today concerning the depiction (illustrated right) of Marc Anthony and Cleopatra, more specifically concerning whether this the meeting or the parting of Marc Anthony and Cleopatra. Some experts claim they can detect a certain haughtiness in Cleopatra's pose which indicates that some form of farewell is intended, but opinion is strongly divided.

The remaining state rooms, built around the internal courtyard, pale in comparison to the ballroom. Nonetheless, each of those other rooms is a masterpiece in its own right. As for the Green Damask Salone, in addition to its sculpted fireplace of inlaid marble it contains huge frescoes, and a ceiling by Pompeo Batoni.

== In the 19th, 20th, and 21st centuries ==
The wealth and power of the Labia family declined with the fall of the Serene Republic in 1797. During the 19th century the Palazzo fell into decay. This coincided with a period where Tiepolo's work was unpopular and unappreciated. In 1945 a munitions boat exploded close to the palazzo, shattering its already precarious foundations, and causing fragments of the ballroom frescoes to fall to the ground.

In 1948 the palazzo acquired a new owner, Don Carlos de Beistegui (Charlie de Beistegui), French-born into a Basque-Spanish family heir to a Mexican fortune, who began an intensive restoration. Beistegui was a skilled natural interior decorator, and for the derelict palazzo, he purchased furnishings acquired from the palazzo's less fortunate neighbours, including frescoes by Raphael, Annibale Carracci, and Guido Reni. These works of art, coupled with newly acquired tapestries and antiques, restored to the palazzo its former splendour. So avid a collector was Don Carlos that his taste became known as le goût Beistegui (the Beistegui style)."

On 3 September 1951 Don Carlos held a masquerade ball, Le Bal oriental, at the Palazzo Labia. It was one of the largest and most lavish social events of the 20th century. It launched the career of the Venetian fashion designer Pierre Cardin, who designed about 30 of the costumes worn by members of the "dolce vita" who attended. Christian Dior and Salvador Dalí designed each other's costumes. Cecil Beaton's photographs of the ball display an almost surreal society, reminiscent of the Venetian life immediately before the fall of the republic at the end of the 18th century. The party was to be one of the truly spectacular events ever held in the famous ballroom.

Don Carlos had a series of strokes in the 1960s and retired to his French seat at Montfort l'Amaury, so he sold it to RAI, Italian State television, who used it as their regional headquarters. He died in 1970, without leaving a will. His estate, which included many of the Palazzo Labia's former contents, and his French home Château de Groussay, which was similarly furnished, went to his brother, who gave Groussay to his son Jean (Johnny) de Beistegui. When Groussay and the former Palazzo Labia items were auctioned by Sotheby's in 1999, it proved to be France's largest and most highly priced auction.

Occasionally the ballroom is used for high-ranking international conferences and summits; this room and some of the state rooms are open to public viewing by appointment.

In April 2008 RAI put the palazzo on sale, binding it to cultural use, as requested by Venice Municipality.

Then during the press preview week of the 2019 Venice Biennale Dior and Venetian Heritage Foundation staged at the palazzo, the Tiepolo Ball in the spirit of Le Bal Oriental. It was attended by many celebrity guests including Tilda Swinton, Sienna Miller, Karlie Kloss, Hamish Bowles, Dasha Zhukova, Monica Bellucci, and Sandro Kopp.
