= Labra (surname) =

Labra is a surname. Notable people with the surname include:

- Armando Labra (1943–2006), Mexican economist
- Berting Labra (1933–2009), Filipino actor
- Carilda Oliver Labra (1922–2018), Cuban poet
- Carlos Fernando Flores Labra (born 1943), Chilean engineer, entrepreneur and politician
- Onofre Jarpa Labra (1849–1940), Chilean landscape painter
- Patricia Labra (born 1986), Chilean lawyer
- Rafael María de Labra (1840–1918), Spanish educator and politician
