= Labial =

The term labial originates from Labium (Latin for "lip"), and is the adjective that describes anything of or related to lips, such as lip-like structures. Thus, it may refer to:

- the lips
  - In linguistics, a labial consonant
  - In zoology, the labial scales
- the labia (genitalia)
- Labial (gene), a gene in Drosophila melanogaster
