= Alessandro Tremignon =

Italian architect

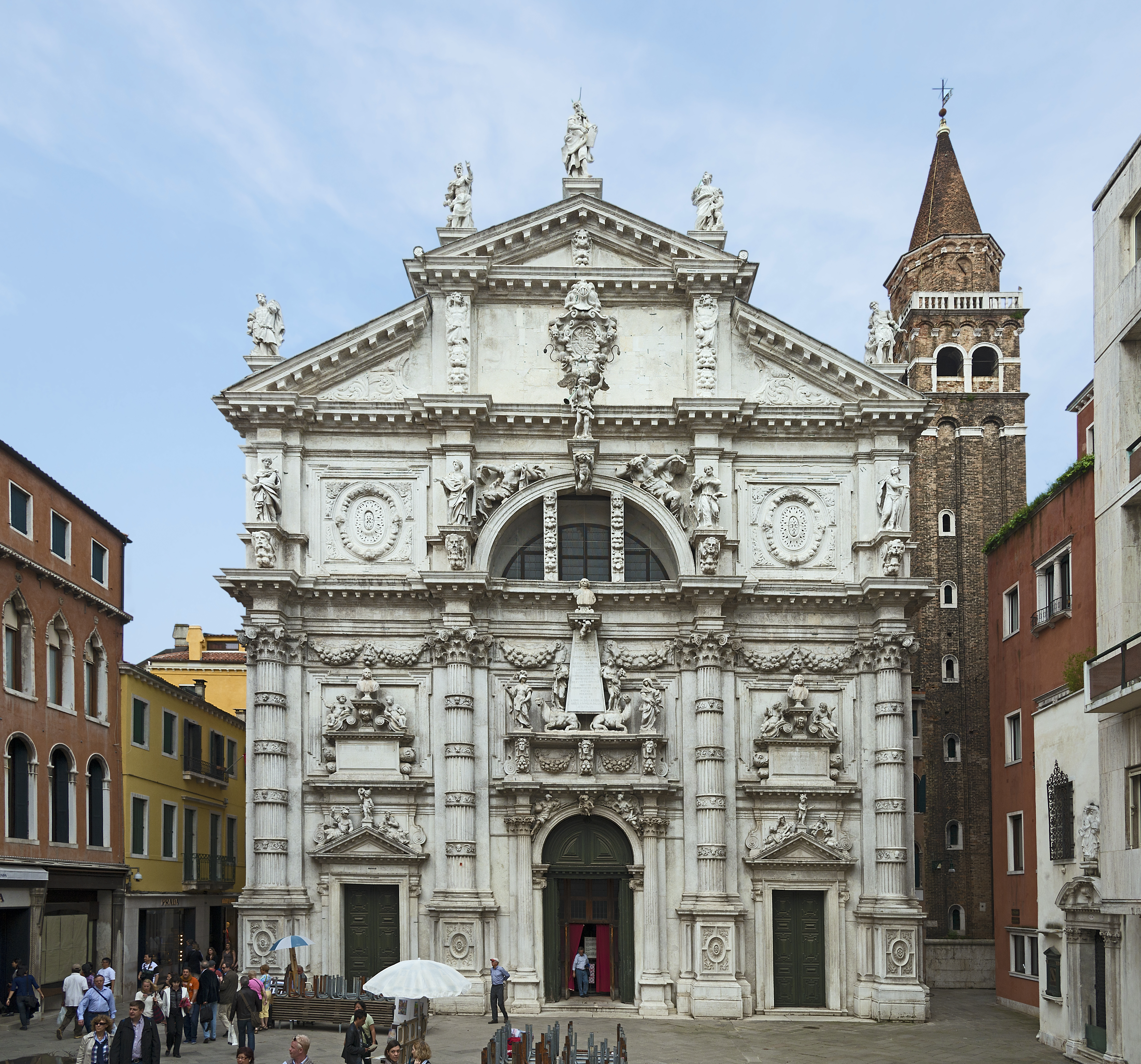
- Facade of the San Moisè church (1668)
- Born: 1635; Padua
- Died: 1711 (aged 75–76); Venice
- Occupation: Architect
- Known for: Facade of the San Moisè church

Alessandro Tremignón (or Tremignàn, Tremiglióne; 1635–1711) was an Italian architect from Padua.

== Work ==
Tremignon was active in Venice. He was influenced by Baldassare Longhèna. Tremignon adapted the High Baroque structural style of Longhena into a typically Late Baroque style with pictorial effects exemplified by the facade of the San Moisè church.

His most famous work is the c. 1688 facade of the San Moisè with its exuberant sculptural decorations. The name of the church of San Moisè (Saint Moses) treats the old-Testament figure of Moses as a saint in the Byzantine manner. It also honors Moisè Venier, who paid for restoration of the church in the tenth century. The facade was designed by Tremignon and mostly sculpted by Heinrich Meyring (Arrigo Meréngo), one of Gian Lorenzo Bernini's pupils. It features grotesque carvings of camels above the main entrance. The main altarpiece, also the work of Tremignon and Meyring, represents Mount Sinai with Moses Receiving the Tablets. John Ruskin wrote of San Moisè, "It is notable as one of the basest examples of the basest school of the Renaissance."

The Palazzo Flangini Fini is attributed to Tremignon, and was built around 1688. Tremignon built the entrance to the Venetian Arsenal to the east of St. Mark's Square between 1692 and 1694. Around 1700 Tremignon and Andrea Cominelli were the architects of the Palazzo Labia. Tremignon also designed the high altar of the Cathedral of Santa Maria Assunta (Chioggia), with engraved scenes of the life of the Virgin Mary and the two patron saints.

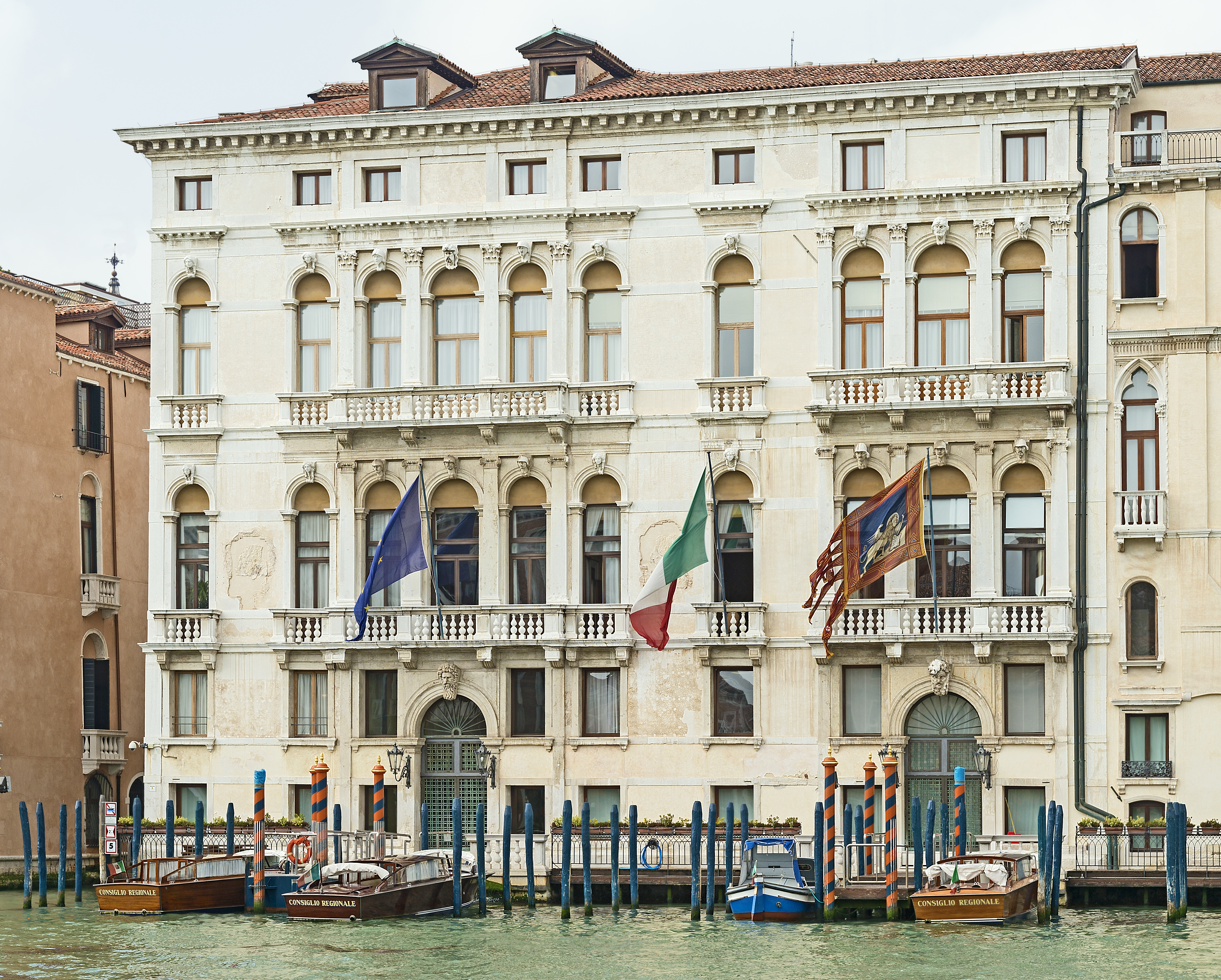
Palazzo Flangini Fini (1688)

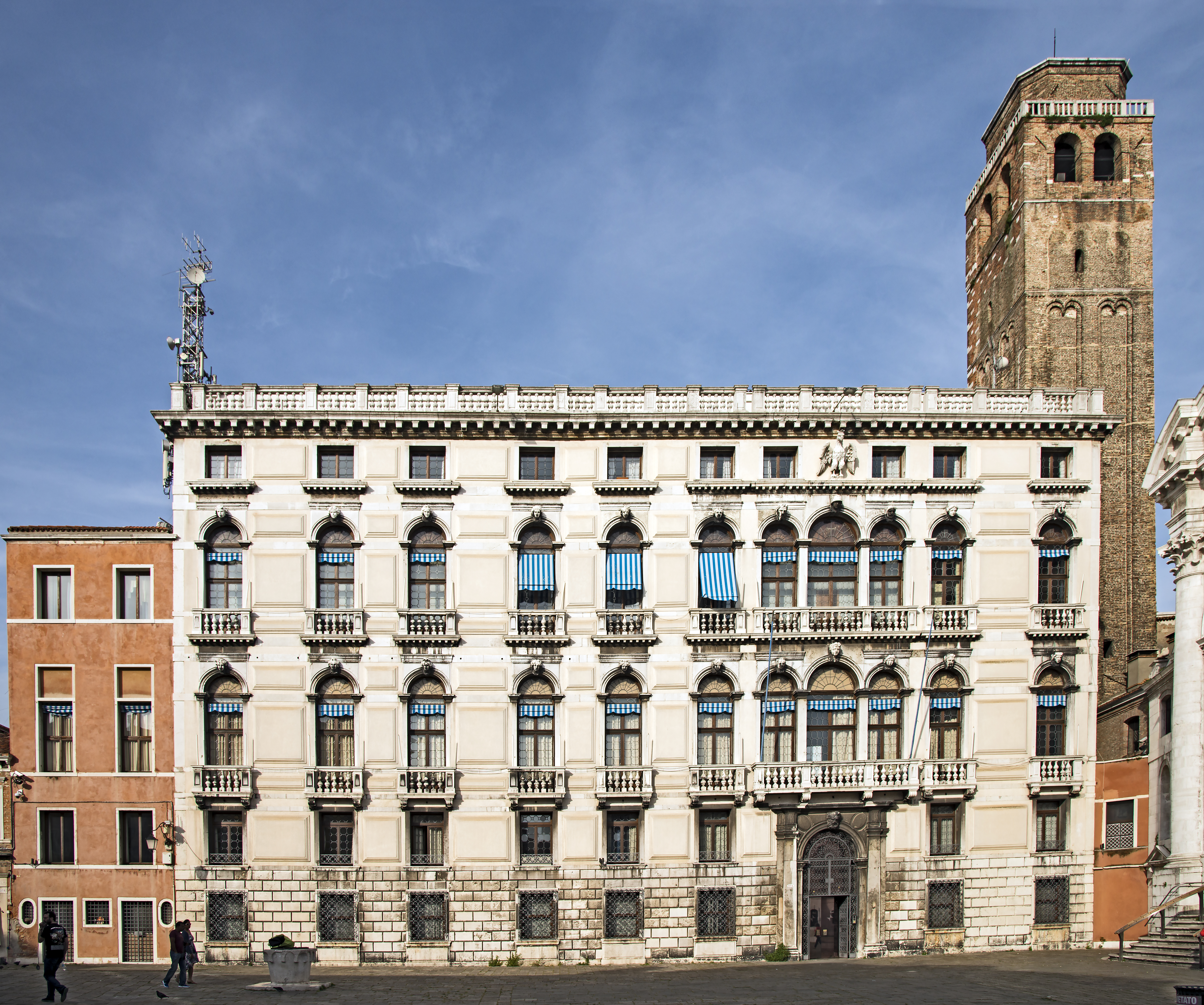
Palazzo Labia (1700)

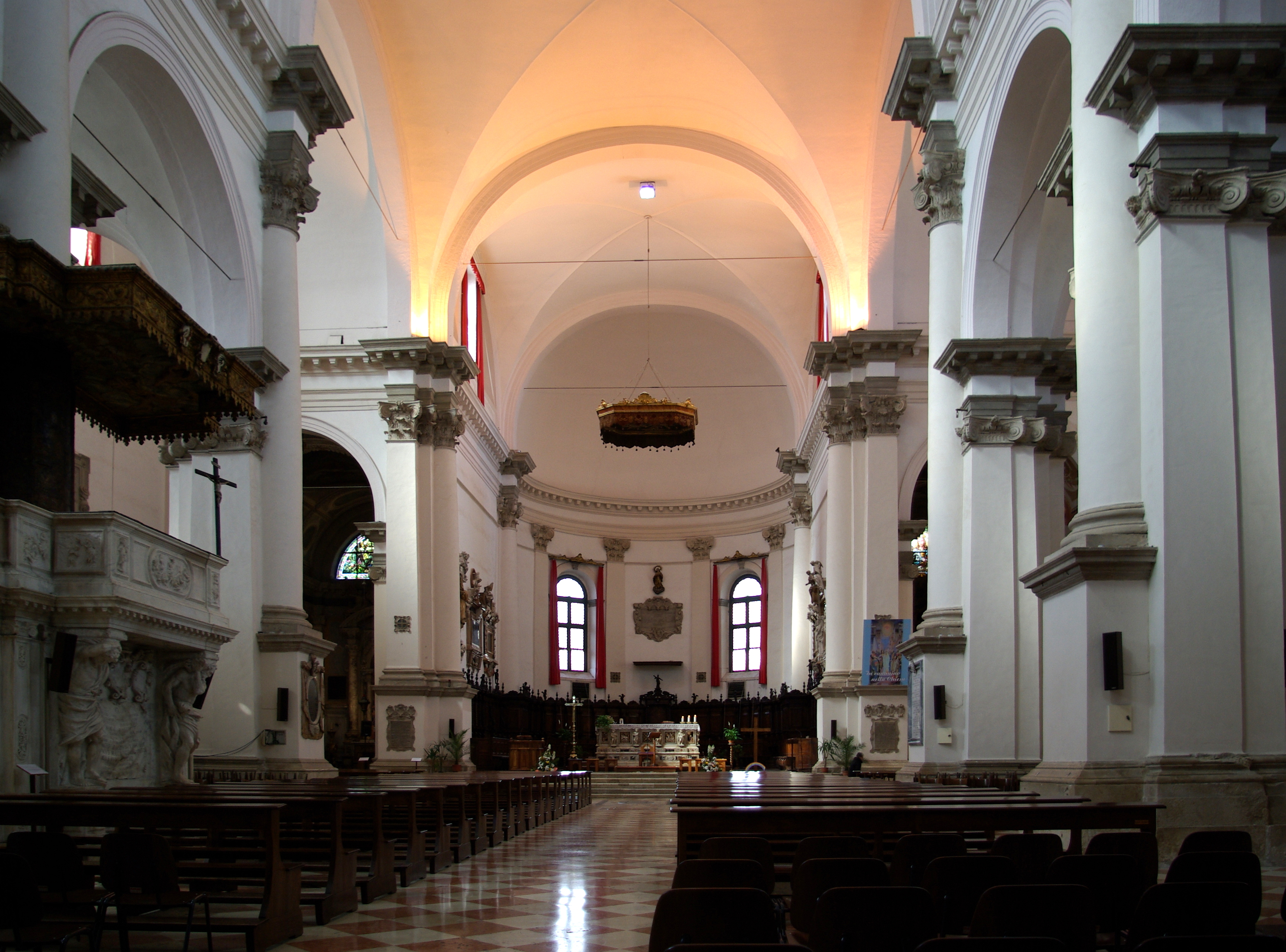
Cathedral of Santa Maria Assunta (Chioggia)

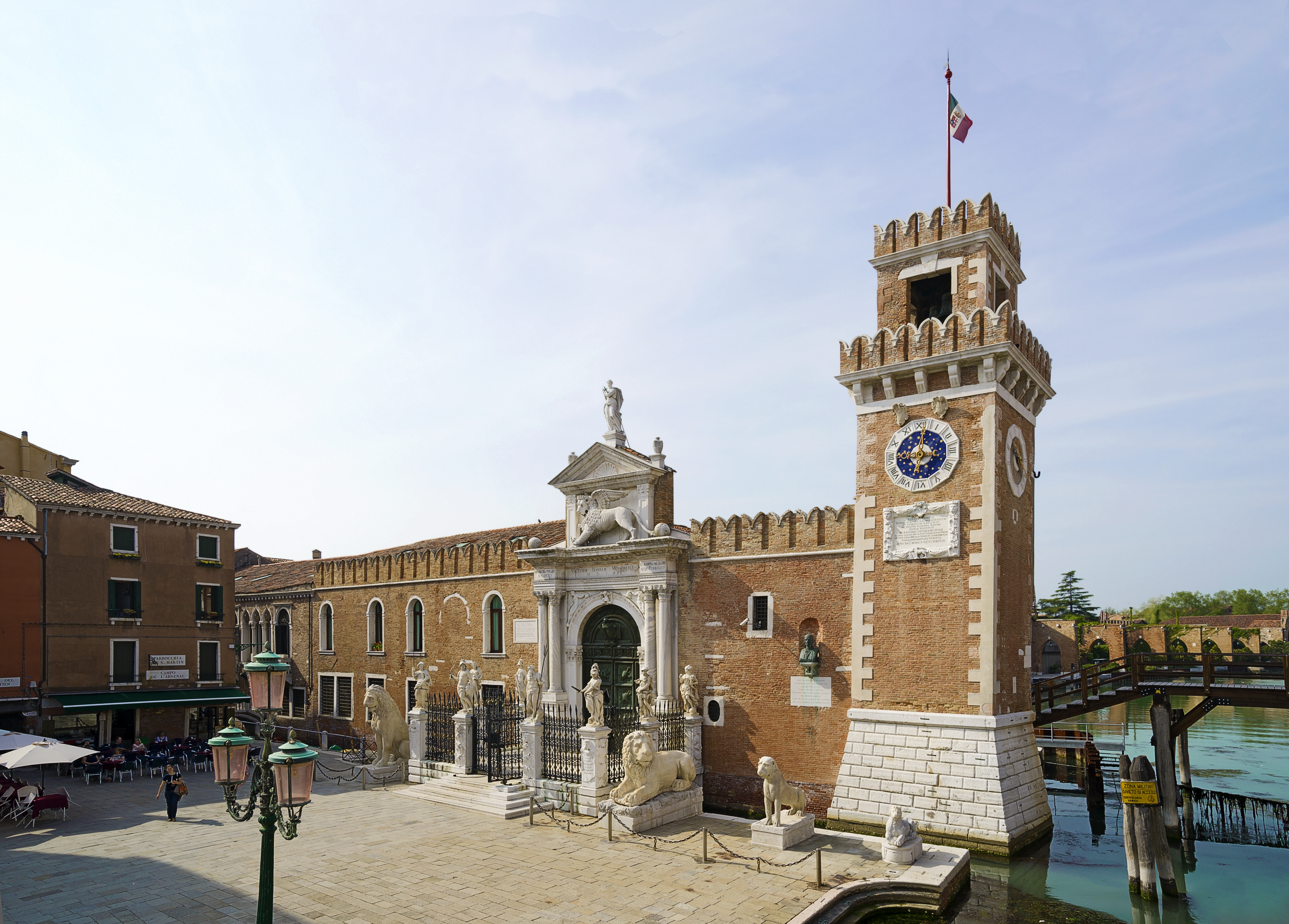
The porta magna of the Venetian Arsenal

== Sources ==
- Dunford, Martin; Belford, Ros; Jepson, Tim; Woolfrey, Celia (2013-03-01). The Rough Guide to Italy. Rough Guides. ISBN 978-1-4093-2545-1.
- Ferraro, Joanne M. (2012-07-30). Venice: History of the Floating City. Cambridge University Press. ISBN 978-0-521-88359-7.
- Gianni, Letizia (1985). Venezia (in Italian). Touring Editore. ISBN 978-88-365-0006-2.
- Hattersley, Sara (2013-11-23). "The Venetian Arsenal" (PDF). University of Warwick. Archived from the original (PDF) on 2014-10-29.
- Honour, Hugh (1997). The Companion Guide to Venice. Companion Guides. ISBN 978-1-900639-24-8.
- "Santa Maria Assunta Cathedral (Chioggia)". My Best Planet. Archived from the original on 2014-10-29.
- "Tremignón, Alessandro". L'Enciclopedia Italiana. Trecanni.
- Wittkower, Rudolf (1999). Art and Architecture in Italy, 1600-1750. Yale University Press. ISBN 978-0-300-07941-8.
