= Labrum =

Labrum Latin, defined as "having the edge"

- Labrum (architecture), a large water-filled vessel or basin with an overhanging lip
- Labrum (arthropod mouthpart), a flap-like structure in front of the mouth in almost all extant Euarthropoda
- Bronwyn Labrum, New Zealand cultural historian and author
- Delta Crateris, a star in the constellation Crater with the traditional name Labrum
- Acetabular labrum, a ring of cartilage that surrounds the acetabulum, the socket of the hip joint
- Glenoid labrum, a lip-like projection of cartilage on the human scapula (shoulder blade) surrounding the joint between the humerus and the shoulder blade

== See also ==
- Labium (disambiguation)
- Labra (disambiguation)
