= Palazzo Ferro Fini =

Palace in Venice

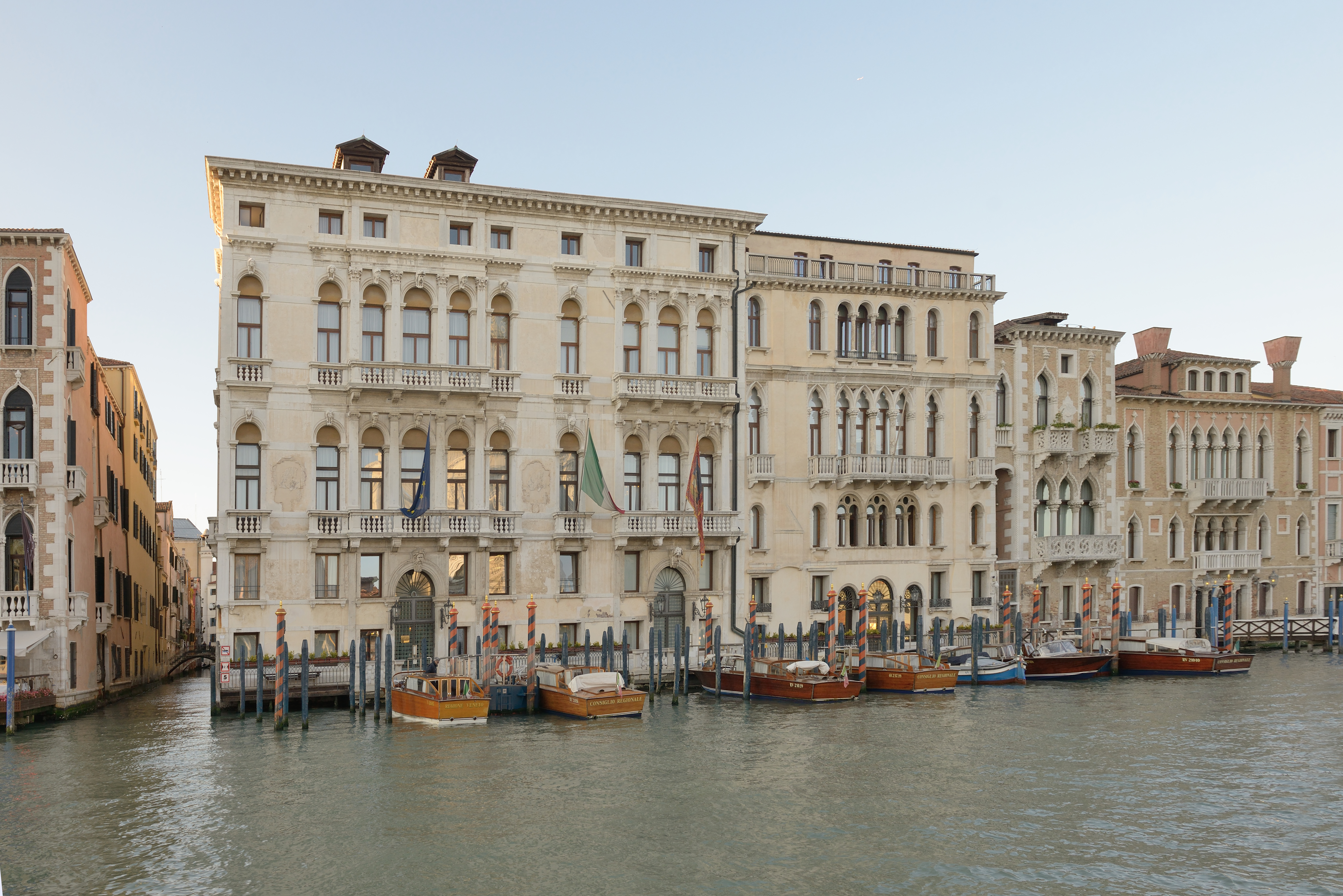
- Palazzo Ferro Fini, facade on Grand Canal

- Location within Veneto

General information
- Type: Palace
- Coordinates: 45.431738°N 12.333875°E
- Elevation: 0
- Completed: 17th century

Technical details
- Floor count: 4

Design and construction
- Architect: Alessandro Tremignon

The Palazzo Ferro Fini is a historical building in Venice, Italy. It was originally two buildings, the Palazzo Morosini Ferro and the Palazzo Flangini Fini, which were combined into one in the 1860s to create the luxury Hotel New York, later renamed the Grand Hotel. The hotel was occupied by troops in World War II (1939–45). By 1970 the hotel was in decay, and the building was purchased by the Veneto region, which undertook extensive renovations and made it the seat of the regional council.

== Building ==
The Palazzo Ferro Fini is located on the north bank of the Grand Canal in the section between the Ponte dell'Accademia and Piazza San Marco, opposite the Church of Santa Maria della Salute built by the 17th century architect Baldassarre Longhena. The building combines two adjacent Renaissance-style buildings. It has the classic Venetian layout, with an atrium that spans the whole building from the waterfront to the landward side, and an interior garden or courtyard. The interior has been renovated several times, but the exterior is unchanged. The larger Palazzo Fini has a typical Renaissance facade, while the facade of the smaller Palazzo Ferro is Gothic in style. Both have light plaster walls, recently restored. The two buildings had separate histories until they were combined into a hotel in the late 19th century. After extensive interior renovations, the palace today is the seat of the Regional Council of Venice.

== History ==
=== Palazzo Flangini Fini ===
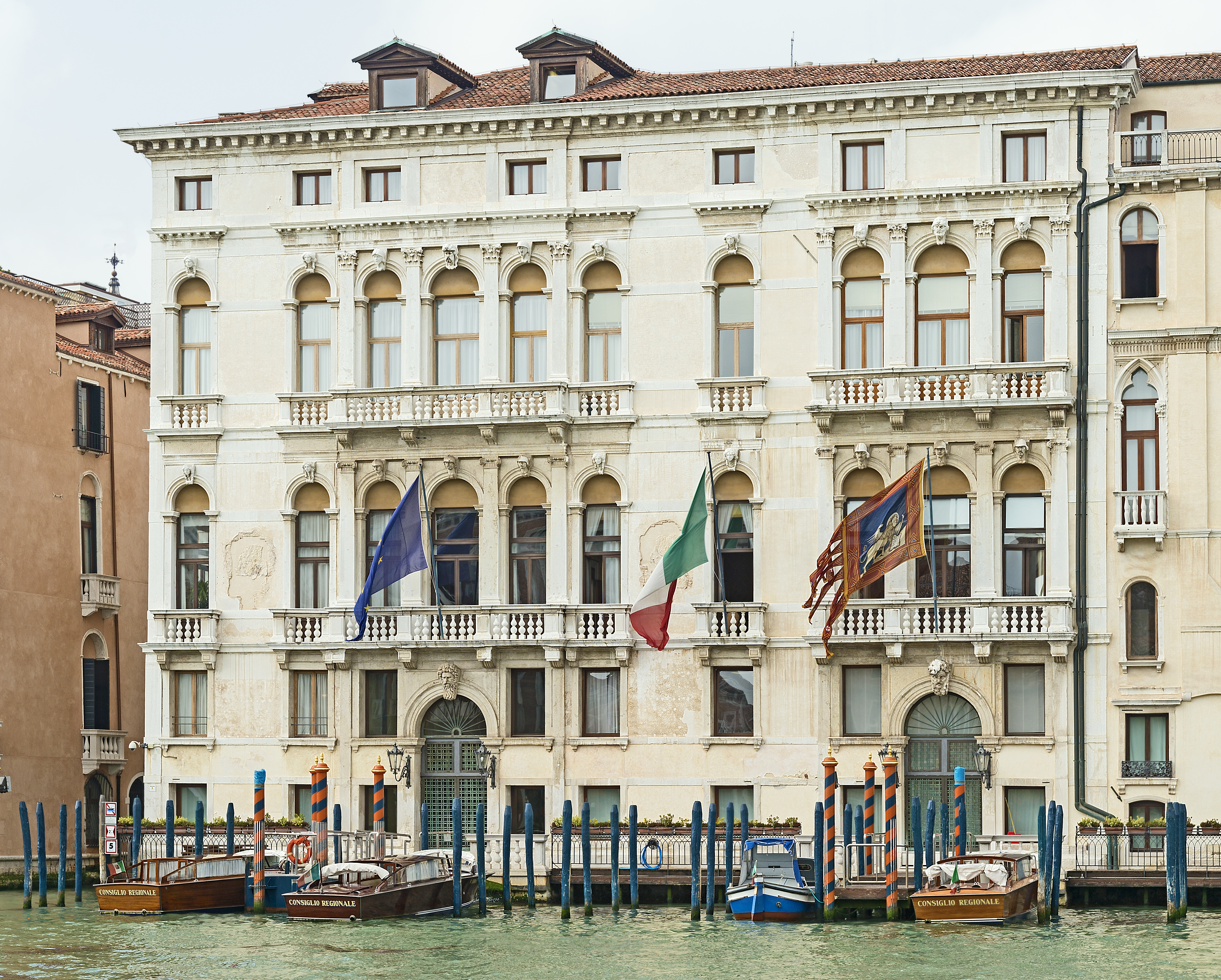
Palazzo Flangini Fini

The Palazzo Fini was started by Tommaso Flangini, a wealthy Greek tax lawyer from Corfu. In 1620 he rented a house on the Grand Canal owned by the Contarini family, who promised to renovate the building which was in dilapidated condition. In 1638, Flangini bought the building and its neighbor, razed them to the ground, and put up a new building completed in 1640. After Flangini's daughter died without heirs, the building was inherited by the Greek community of Venice, to be sold and the proceeds used to support young Greeks. In 1662, Jerome Fini bought the palace. He was also a wealthy tax lawyer, from a Greek family that had moved from Cyprus in the 16th century. Fini paid the large sum of 120,000 ducats for the palace and other real estate in the province.

The Fini family contributed much in decorations, and restored the palace several times. The Palazzo Flangini Fini is generally attributed to Alessandro Tremignon, from around 1688. Tremignon did much work for the Fini family. However, it appears that Pietro Bettinelli did most of the work, and Tremignon was brought in at the end to finish the interior and facade. The facade is impressive, but is clearly asymmetric since it was derived from two earlier buildings, formerly owned by the Contarini and the Da Ponte families. All openings other than the rectangular windows of the two mezzanines have round arches and balconies, with marble keystones in the arches decorated with bold and expressive heads. The overall effect is simple and elegant.

The interior was decorated with high quality stucco and with framed paintings by Antonio Zanchi, Luca da Reggio and Pietro Liberi. Many of the rooms had magnificent ceilings with beams decorated in gilt and polychrome motifs. Later, the palace fell into decay. The Fini family was impoverished after the fall of the Republic of Venice. In 1850 Bianca Zane Fini left her children the palace, now divided into apartments, some leased and some sold.

=== Palazzo Morosini Ferro Manolesso ===
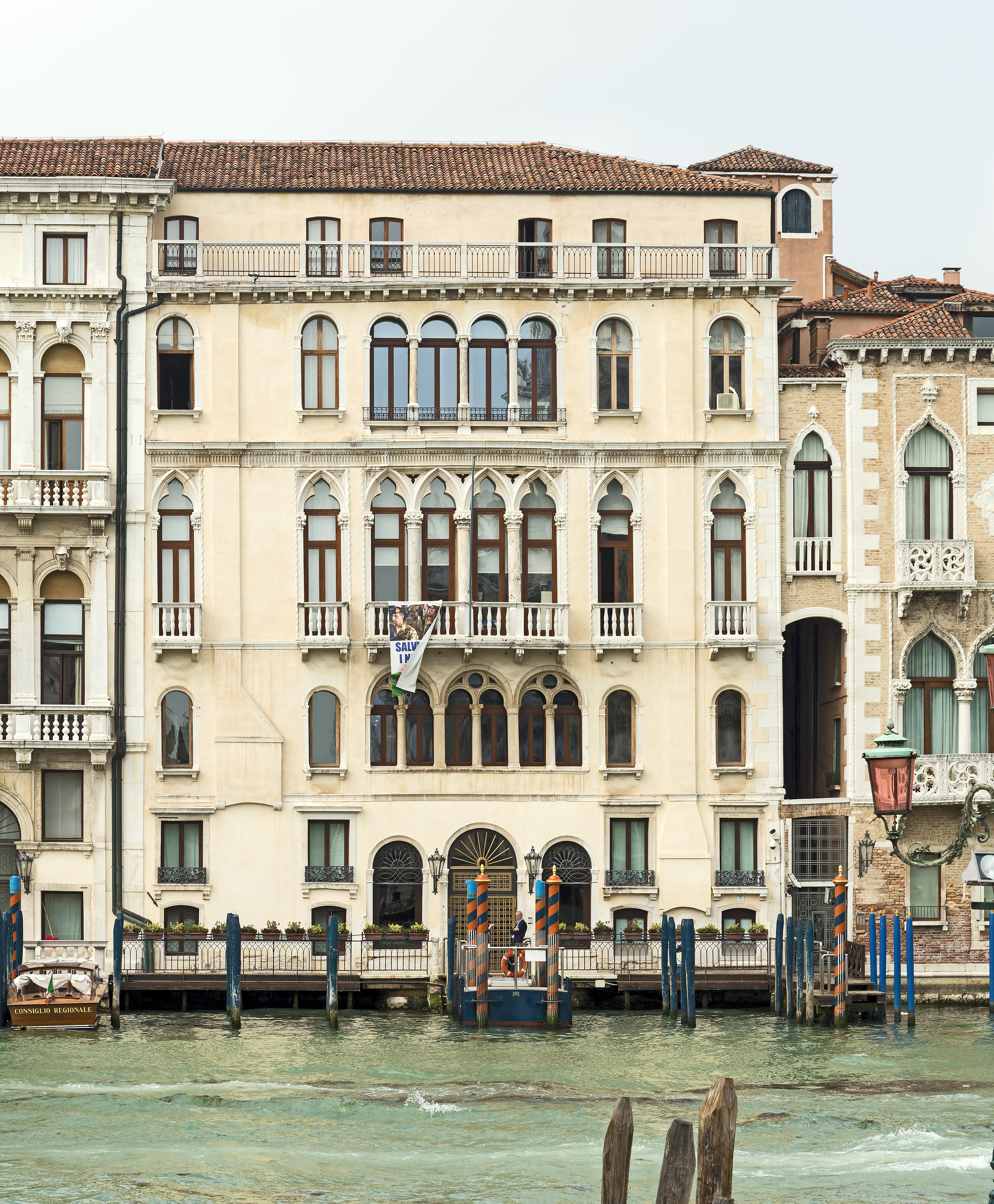
Palazzo Morosini Ferro Manolesso

The site of the Palazzo Ferro was originally occupied by a house owned by the Morosini family. It was bought by Michele Morosini, Doge of Venice in 1382. He acquired the property at a time when many Venetians were leaving the city due to the threat from Genoa, and property was cheap. The Morosini family decorated the palace with paintings by artists such as Titian, Tintoretto and Jacopo Bassano. Around 1740 the building passed to the Ferro family, who had come from Flanders in the 14th century. In 1816 the last family member, Anthony Lazzaro Ferro, died without an heir and left the palace to his nephew Zorzi Monolesso.

=== Palazzo Ferro Fini ===
In 1860, Laura Moschini, wife of the Dalmatian Luigi Ivancich, bought the Palazzo Ferro and transformed it into one of the most elegant and comfortable hotels in Venice, originally called the Hotel New York, and later the Grand Hotel. In the years that followed the Ivancich family acquired the Palazzo Fini and gradually integrated it with the Palazzo Ferro. Around the end of the 19th century and start of the 20th century the luxury hotel was at its peak, with royal apartments and prestigious suites occupied by the rich and famous. During World War II the hotel was occupied first by German troops and then by Americans. After the war the hotel remained in the state of decay, with only minor repairs. The Ivancich family retained ownership until 1972 when the property was purchased by the Province of Venice, then transferred to the Region of Venice, which undertook extensive renovations.

== Renovation ==
The palace was restored by the architect Luciano Parenti for the Veneto Region. The renovation tried to restore the original interior organization, which had been much altered over the years. This involved careful research and analysis of the structure to determine what could be preserved or restored, consistent with modern requirements. Restoration of the original halls and rooms was largely compatible with the need for open spaces and reception rooms. A meeting chamber for the Regional Council was built in the center of the palace. Surviving paintings, stucco ceilings and other valuables were cleaned, and the exterior facade was radically cleaned and restored to reveal the original architectural elements.

On the ground floor the Hall of Arms runs through the palace from the landing on the Grand Canal to the landward entrance. It is decorated with the ancient coat of arms of Veneto municipalities and symbols of the seven provinces, as well as the work of contemporary Veneto artists. A plaster cast of a lion, symbol of the Venetian Republic, stands in the center of the room. The first floor of the building is the Piano nobile with reception rooms for guests and delegations. There are paintings on the walls and ceilings, stucco and wooden ceilings. The rooms have an excellent view over the Grand Canal. The second floor is used for the offices of the senior staff of the Region of Venice. The restored rooms represent the living space of the typical Venetian lord, with painted ceilings, terrazzo floors, damask upholstery, fireplaces, mirrors, wardrobes and balconies over the canal. The Sala cuoi (Leather room) takes its name from the wall coverings, which are made of leather squares molded into three-dimensional patterns and then glued to the wall. The wall covering, coated with gold dust, served to insulate and also to display the wealth of the family.

== 2019 Venice floods ==
On November 12, 2019, the Regional Council of Veneto, which meets in the Palazzo, "rejected a number of policy amendments designed to tackle climate change." Just minutes later, at around 10 PM, "flood waters rushed into the council chambers." This was first time the Palazzo had ever flooded.

== Sources ==
- Gianni, Letizia (1985). Venezia (in Italian). Touring Editore. ISBN 978-88-365-0006-2.
- "Il Consiglio". Consiglio regionale del Veneto. Archived from the original on 2018-10-13.
- "Palazzo Ferro Fini (Consiglio Regionale del Veneto)". Canal Grande di Venezia.
- "Sala cuoi", Visita Vitualle a Palazzo Ferro Fini, Consiglio Regionale del Veneto, archived from the original on 2014-11-11
- "Salone degli stemmi", Visita Vitualle a Palazzo Ferro Fini, Consiglio Regionale del Veneto, archived from the original on 2014-11-11
