= Georges Geffroy =

Georges Geffroy (January 8th, 1905 – April 29th, 1971) was a post-war French interior designer.

== Biography ==
"An eighteenth-century gentleman, a figure from another era, one of a breed of decorators that is extinct today,” remembers couturier Hubert de Givenchy; Geffroy was a purist. He never accepted more than one job at a time, so he could devote himself entirely to each assignment. He guided his clients in buying art, assisting them with the polite authority of a connoisseur. In the appraisal of antique furniture, he had an especially unerring eye. The designer was a prominent society figure in postwar Paris, and his clients were invariably personal friends. In the afternoons, he could be seen making the rounds of the dealers with millionaire socialite Arturo Lopez-Willshaw, whom he would later escort through the galleries.

Geffroy was born in Paris on January 8th, 1905. He began his career as a fashion designer, working for Antoine de Grandsaignes of Decour. He later became an interior designer and was popular among the French elite in postwar Paris. He had his taffetas, silk satins, and failles made by Prelle, a silk manufacturer located in Lyon. He is known for his unconventional choices in textiles, unique pieces of furniture that he designed, and a love of antiques.

He died in Paris on April 29th, 1971, at the age of 66.
