= Gerolamo Mengozzi Colonna =

Italian painter

Gerolamo Mengozzi Colonna (1688 – Venice, 27 October 1774) was an Italian painter, mostly of frescoed quadratura.

== Biography ==
Born in Ferrara, Gerolamo was a pupil of the painters of architectural perspective painters Antonio Felice Ferrari and Francesco Scala in Emilia-Romagna. He moved to Venice by 1716, where he began collaborations that spanned over four decades with Giovanni Battista Tiepolo and his son Giandomenico.

By 1716, he signs a contract with Mattia Bortoloni to decorate in fresco the Villa Cornaro in Piombino Dese for the patrician Andrea Cornaro. It is presumed that the two latter artists collaborated in decorating the octagonal room of the Villa Morosini Vendramin Calergi in Fiesso Umbertiano.

Mengozzi's first collaboration with Tiepolo was the decoration of the hall on the first floor (1719-1720) of the Villa Baglioni in Massanzago, depicting the Myth of Phaeton on the walls and the Triumph of Aurora on the ceiling. This was followed by the Apotheosis of Santa Teresa (1724-1725) in the vault of a chapel of the church of Santa Maria degli Scalzi. He also collaborated with Tiepolo in paintings for the church of the Cappucini in the sestiere of Castello. The products of these collaborations featured Mengozzi in the quadratura or painted architectural vistas, and Tiepolo painting the figures.

In 1726, he worked with Tiepolo in the gallery of the archbishop's palace and the Chapel of the Holy Sacrament in the Cathedral of Udine. This work was commissioned by the patrician Dionisio Dolfin. The frescoed scenes of Dream of Jacob, Sacrifice of Isaac, Hagar in the Desert, Rachel and the Idols, Abraham and the Angels, and Sarah and the Angel were all completed in collaboration with Mengozzi

Together with the Tiepolo, Mengozzi helped decorate the Venetian Palazzo Labia in 1745-1747 . The ceiling depicts Bellerophon on Pegasus in flight toward the Glory and Eternity, while the walls are frescoed with the Meeting and Banquet of Anthony and Cleopatra. The quadratura painted frames the events.

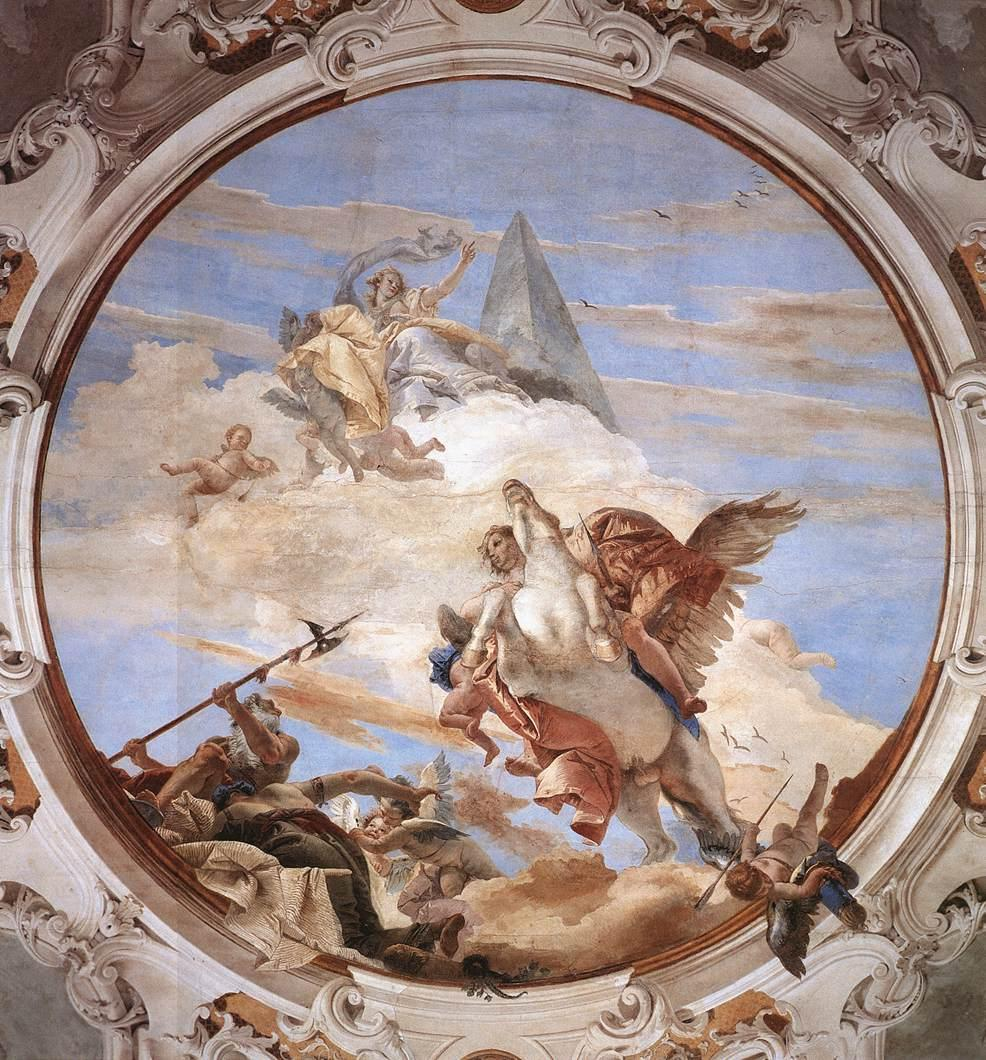
Mengozzi's contribution to the fresco of Bellerophon is the Trompe-l'œil architecture around scenes, doorways and framing this oval

During most of the years between 1720 and 1743, Mengozzi was a member of the Venetian painters' guild. He journeyed to Rome in 1724. He entered the Academy of St. Luke, gave lectures in perspective in 1725-26. Returning to Venice, in 1727 he became a member of the newly formed Accademia of Fine Arts in Venice, and became a professor by 1766.

Between 1728 and 1733, he also worked as a scenic designer, a common pursuit for quadraturistas. He painted sets for the theaters of San Samuele and of San Giovanni Grisostomo. Between 1749-1750 he also worked with sets of Teatro Regio in Turin. He was employed in decoration of the Palazzina di Caccia of Stupinigi.

Mengozzi also collaborated with the son of Giovanni Battista, Giandomenico Tiepolo. In 1754 he completed architectural perspective for scenes filled with figures by Giandomenico in the church of Santi Faustino e Giovita in Brescia. In 1757, with father and son Tiepolo, he painted the walls of the Palazzo Valmarana at Vicenza. Later that year, he collaborated with the elder Tiepolo in decorating certain salons in Ca' Rezzonico. In the Palazzo Rezzonico, Tiepolo and Mengozzi were commissioned to decorate rooms for the wedding of Louis and Faustina Savorgnan. In the wedding room ceiling, we see the couple carried on Apollo's chariot, drawn by four white horses, preceded by Cupid, blindfolded and surrounded by allegorical figures: the three Graces, Fame, Wisdom, bearing the flag of Merit with the heraldic arms of the Rezzonico and Savorgnan family. Again Tiepolo made the figures, while Mengozzi frames the scenes. In the Throne Room, they depicted the Triumph of Merit, which ascends to the temple of glory. Between 1760 and 1762 and Mengozzi and the elder Tiepolo collaborated in the massive Glory of the Pisani family on the ceiling of the central hall in the Villa Pisani at Stra.

With the departure of Tiepolo for Spain in 1762, Mengozzi began a collaboration with Jacopo Guarana, a pupil of Tiepolo, in the chapel of the ducal palace. In addition, Mengozzi's son, Agostino (Venice, c. 1725-1792), also became well known as a quadraturista. Among his pupils was Giovanni Giacomo Monti.

== Sources ==
- Boni, Filippo de' (1852). Biografia degli artisti ovvero dizionario della vita e delle opere dei pittori, degli scultori, degli intagliatori, dei tipografi e dei musici di ogni nazione che fiorirono da'tempi più remoti sino á nostri giorni. Seconda Edizione.. Venice; Googlebooks: Presso Andrea Santini e Figlio. pp. 640–641.
