= Ghislaine de Polignac =

Princess Ghislaine de Polignac
- Born: 5 September 1918
- Died: January 2011 (aged 92)
- Occupations: Fashion stylist and promoter, author
- Spouse: Prince Edmond Jean Henri Marie de Polignac (1939-1946)
- Children: Two sons and two daughters
- Parents: Victor Brinquant (father); Simone Durand de Villers (mother)

Princess Ghislaine de Polignac (5 September 1918 – January 2011) was a prominent member of Paris society, bon vivant, fashion stylist and promoter, and author.

== Early life and title ==
Born on 5 September 1918 as Ghislaine Charlotte Claire Brinquant, she was the daughter of Parisian banker Victor Brinquant and Simone Durand de Villers. On 7 July 1939, she married Prince Edmond Jean Henri Marie de Polignac (2 April 1914 – 13 February 2010) of the French noble family. They had two sons and two daughters, before divorcing in November 1946. A court action by the Prince to prevent her subsequently using her title failed, and she remained Princess de Polignac for the remainder of her life.

== Career ==
She subsequently built a career using her extensive contacts to assist society figures, and to create publicity for fashion houses and designers, including Pierre Cardin. In 1952, she became the first fashion stylist of the luxury department store Galeries Lafayette in Paris. In that position, she selected pieces from fashion collections for the store to produce as ready-to-wear clothes.

In the 1960s, she authored monographs on two historic Parisian mansions.

== Personal life ==
After her divorce, she stated she intended to enjoy herself. Considered vivacious, Baron de Redé called her "a live wire in Paris life. She is certainly a survivor, adapting like a chameleon to the changing times". Her lovers included Duff Cooper when British Ambassador to France who wrote in his diary "She is a girl after my own heart, good company, a formidable appetite for pleasure and no nonsense about love".

In 1947 she created a scandal after being discovered by her wealthy American host Rosita Winston in bed with her husband, property magnate Norman Kenneth Winston. In the early 1950s she was the girlfriend of drama critic and novelist Christian Mégret. Her intimate knowledge of the relationship between de Rede and Arturo Lopez enabled Mégret to pen a novel based on them called Danaé, which resulted in her deletion for a time from de Rede's famous guest list. Her last relationship was with the fellow bon vivant Baron Philippe du Pasquier.

She was a close friend of the Duke and Duchess of Windsor.

== Death ==
Princess de Polignac died in Paris aged 92 in January 2011. She was survived by two sons and two daughters, and a mass was held for her in Paris on 3 February 2011.

== Works ==
- L'Hôtel Lambert, Imprimerie Nationale (1964)
- Hôtel des Ambassadeurs de Hollande, Imprimerie Nationale (1968)
