= Karoline Kaulla =

German banker

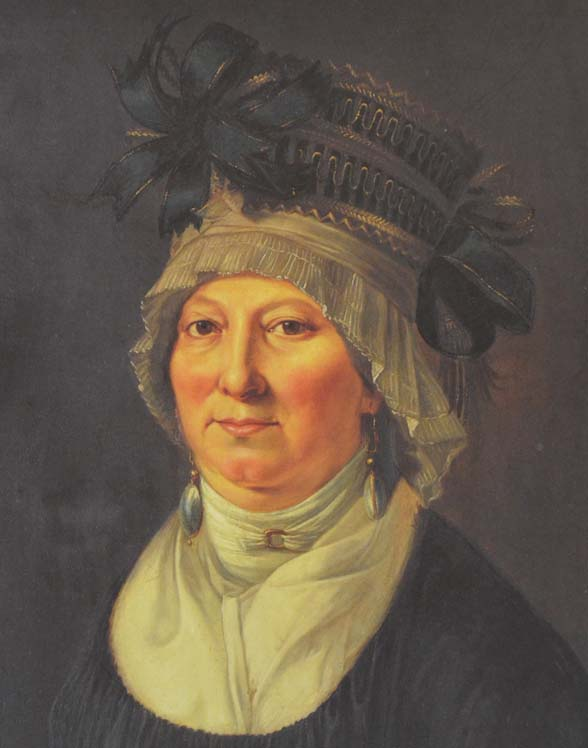
- Portrait of Karoline Kaulla by Johann Baptist Seele

Personal life
- Born: Chaile Raphael; 1739 Buchau am Federsee
- Died: March 18, 1809 (aged 69–70) Hechingen
- Occupation: Court Jew

Religious life
- Religion: Judaism
- Profession: Banker

Karoline (Hebrew: Chaile) Kaulla née Raphael, known foremost as 'Madame Kaulla' or '"Kiefe" Auerbacher' (1739, in Buchau am Federsee – 18 March 1809, in Hechingen), was a German banker. She was one of the most famous Court Jews of her time, and reputed to have been the richest woman in Germany.

== Life ==
=== Early life ===
Karoline Kaulla was the daughter of the banker Yitzchak (Isaak) Raphael and Rifka Wasserman. She was the sister of Jacob Kaulla. They had gained the family name Raphael by adopting the name of their father. She would later change her family name to Kaulla, a play on her birth name Chaile and was adopted by her brother. Her father was Court Jew for the house of Hohenzollern. In 1757, she married Akiva Auerbach who would adopt her last name.

=== Business career ===
In 1768, Karoline Kaulla was appointed court factor to the court of Fürstenberg of Donaueschingen. She provided the court in Donaueschingen with horses, silver, jewellery and other expensive goods.

In 1770, she became court factor for the Duke of Wuerttemberg in Stuttgart.

She functioned as the treasurer at the Royal Württemberg Court, and leader of the Trading House Kaulla in Stuttgart. She was a co-founder of the Royal Württemberg Court Bank, which after many fusions resulted in the Deutsche Bank in the 1920s.

Kaulla was praised for the welfare, her care for the poor regardless of religion, and her works for the Jewish community in Hechingen.

In 1808, Karoline Kaulla was awarded the honor of the Civil-Verdienst-Medaille with golden chain, presented to her by Emperor Franz I, as a recognition of her financial contributions to the Imperial army. The golden chain is now displayed at Yad Vashem historic museum in Jerusalem.
