= Patricia Labra =

Chilean lawyer

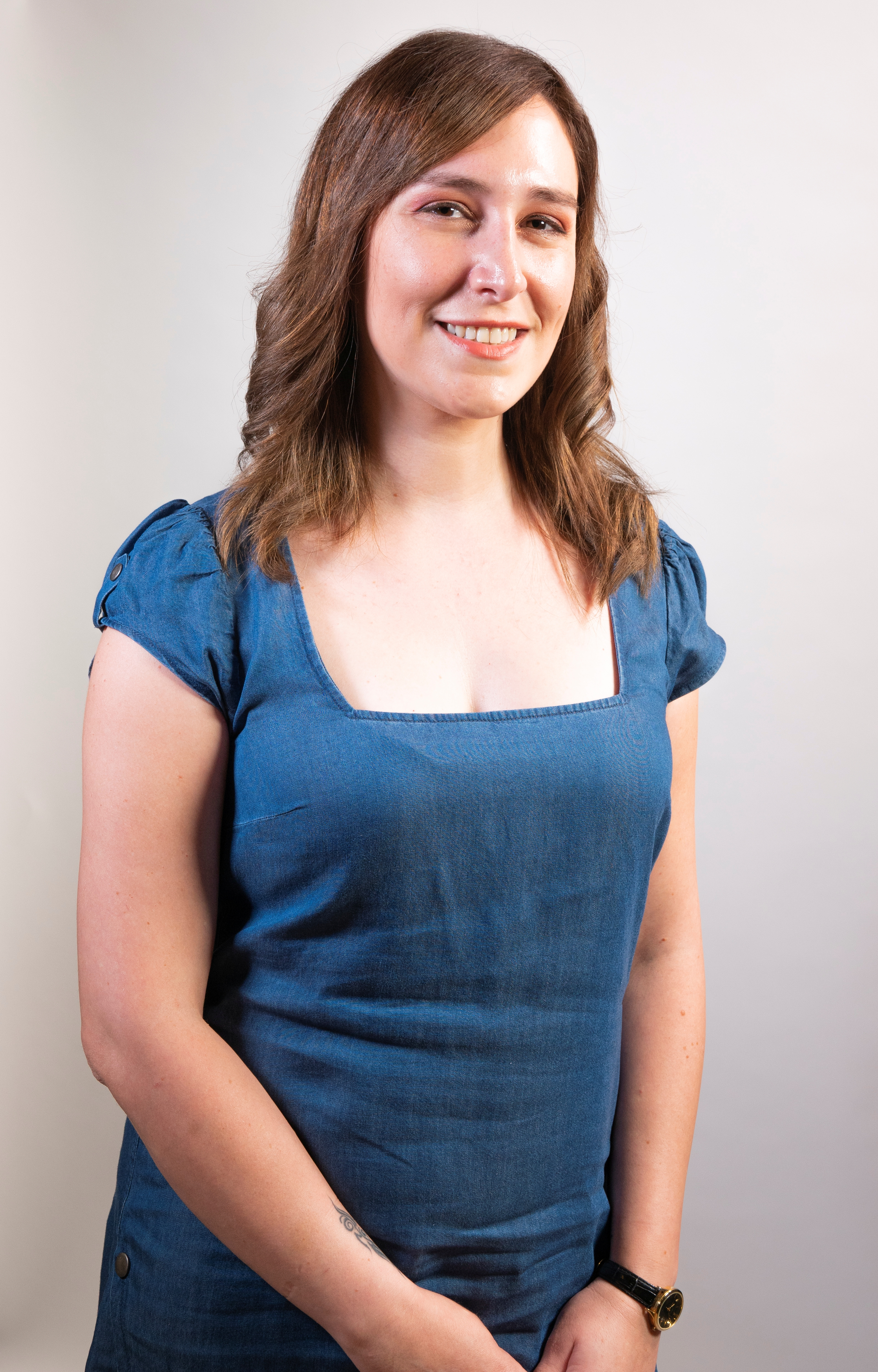

Member of the Constitutional Convention
- In office 4 July 2021 – 4 July 2022
- Constituency: 18th District

Personal details
- Born: 25 April 1986 (age 40) Parral, Chile
- Party: National Renewal
- Relatives: Paula Labra
- Education: Catholic University of the Most Holy Conception (LL.B); University for Development (LL.M)
- Profession: Lawyer

Patricia Labra Besserer (born 25 April 1986) is a Chilean lawyer and politician.

A member of National Renewal, she was elected as a member of the Constitutional Convention in 2021, representing the 18th District of the Maule Region.

== Biography ==
Labra was born on 25 April 1986 in Concepción, Chile. She is the daughter of Guillermo Antonio Labra Ballesta and Gloria Patricia Elisabeth Besserer Camposano.

She is married to Felipe Diez González.

== Professional career ==
Labra completed her secondary education at Colegio Concepción and Colegio San José, both located in the city of Parral. She studied law at the Catholic University of the Most Holy Conception, and later obtained a master’s degree in business law from the University for Development.

She has worked professionally at the Municipality of Retiro and at the Regional Secretariat of the Ministry of National Assets in the Biobío Region, as well as in the private sector.

== Political career ==
In July 2018, she was appointed Regional Coordinator of the National Service for the Elderly (SENAMA) in the Maule Region, a position she held until 2020.

In the elections held on 15–16 May 2021, Labra ran as a candidate for the Constitutional Convention representing the 18th District of the Maule Region, as part of the Vamos por Chile electoral pact.

She obtained 11,890 votes, corresponding to 10.7% of the valid votes cast, and was elected as a member of the Convention.
