= Prelle =

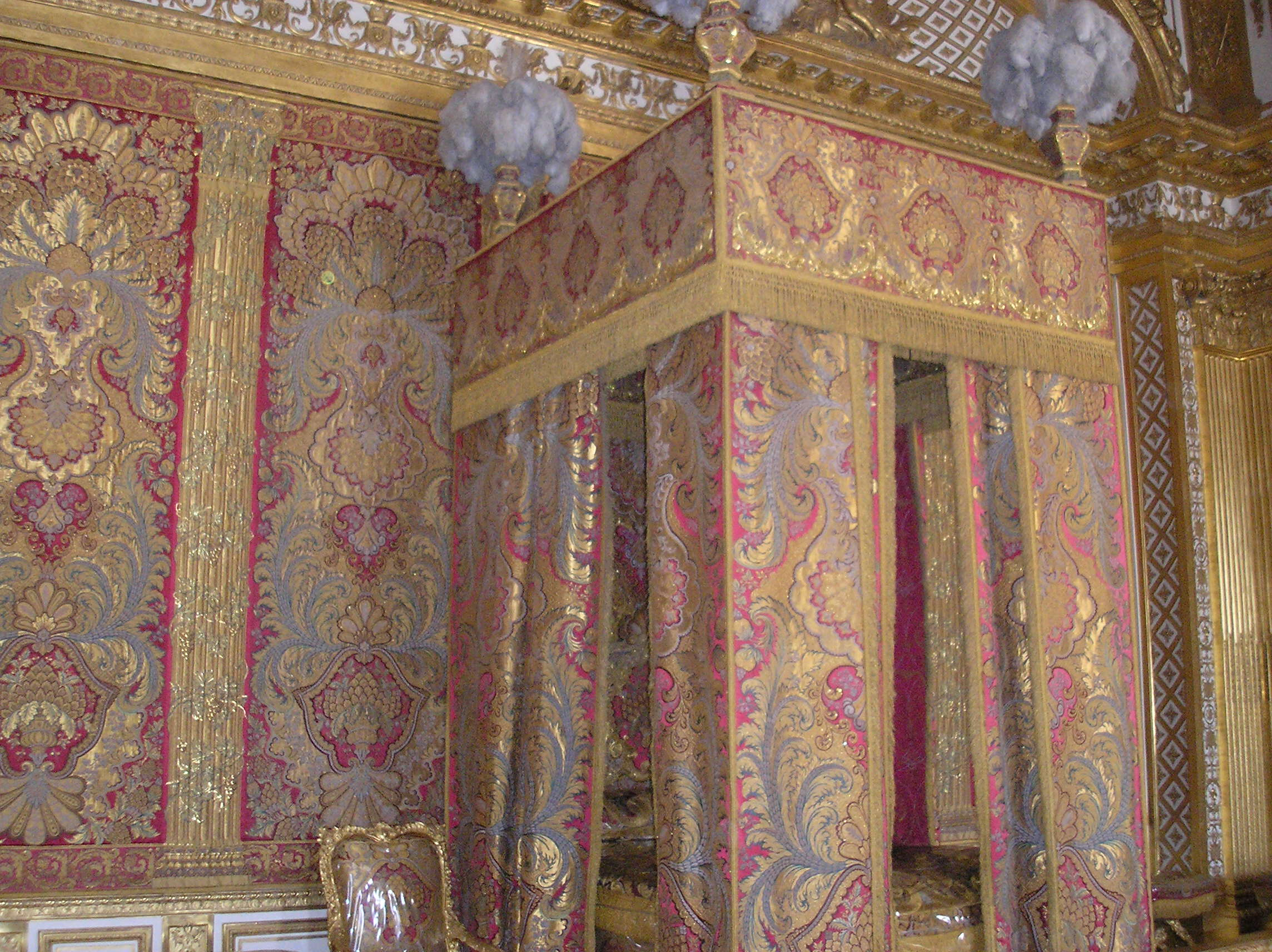

Prelle is a family-owned silk textile mill in operation since 1752. Curators, collectors and interior designers worldwide use their fabrics. The company still has the capability of weaving by hand using century-old wooden looms to recreate 18th and 19th century-style brochés (a type of brocade) and velours ciselé, figured velvets. Some of these fabrics, depending on the complexity of the pattern, will only yield 12 inches of material per day, and lead times for this rarefied fabric can extend to years.

Prelle's archivist has been able to provide their clients with fabric documents for many restoration projects based on the company's own records; these include the draperies for Palais Garnier in Paris, rewoven in this century from original renderings submitted to Prelle in 1874 by Charles Garnier. The Gilded Age homes of America, many of them Vanderbilt Homes, have had their draperies woven and walls paneled with Prelle textiles, a process that continues to this day.

The company also weaves fabrics of contemporary designs on 21st-century computerized looms. Prelle keeps an open stock of dozens of historic patterns at its mill in Lyon, as well as weaving custom textiles for clients throughout the world.
