= Raphael Kaulla =

German court banker

Jacob Raphael Kaulla (died 1 May 1810 in Hechingen) was a German court banker; born at Buchau on the Feder-See about the middle of the eighteenth century.

By a decree dated 27 June 1806, King Frederick of Württemberg, "in view of the various services that the Kaulla family has rendered to the country in critical periods", conferred upon Jacob and a number of his immediate relatives and their descendants of both sexes all rights of citizenship in Württemberg. Jacob Kaulla and his sister, Madame Kaulla, were distinguished as philanthropists.
