= Fausta Labia =

Italian operatic soprano (1870–1935)

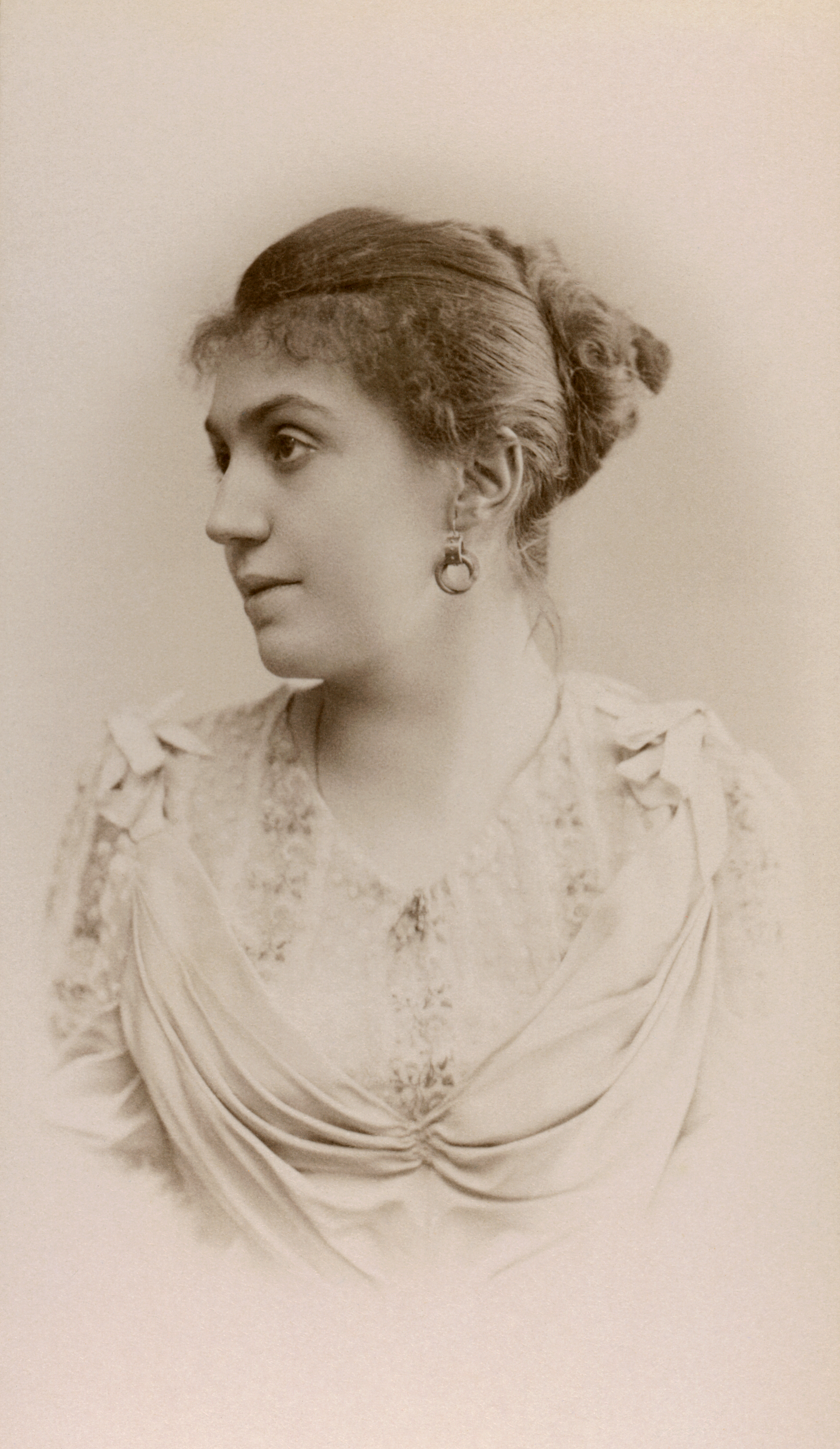
- Fausta Labia in 1893
- Born: 3 April 1870; Verona, Italy
- Died: 6 October 1935 (aged 65); Rome, Italy
- Occupations: Operatic soprano; Voice teacher

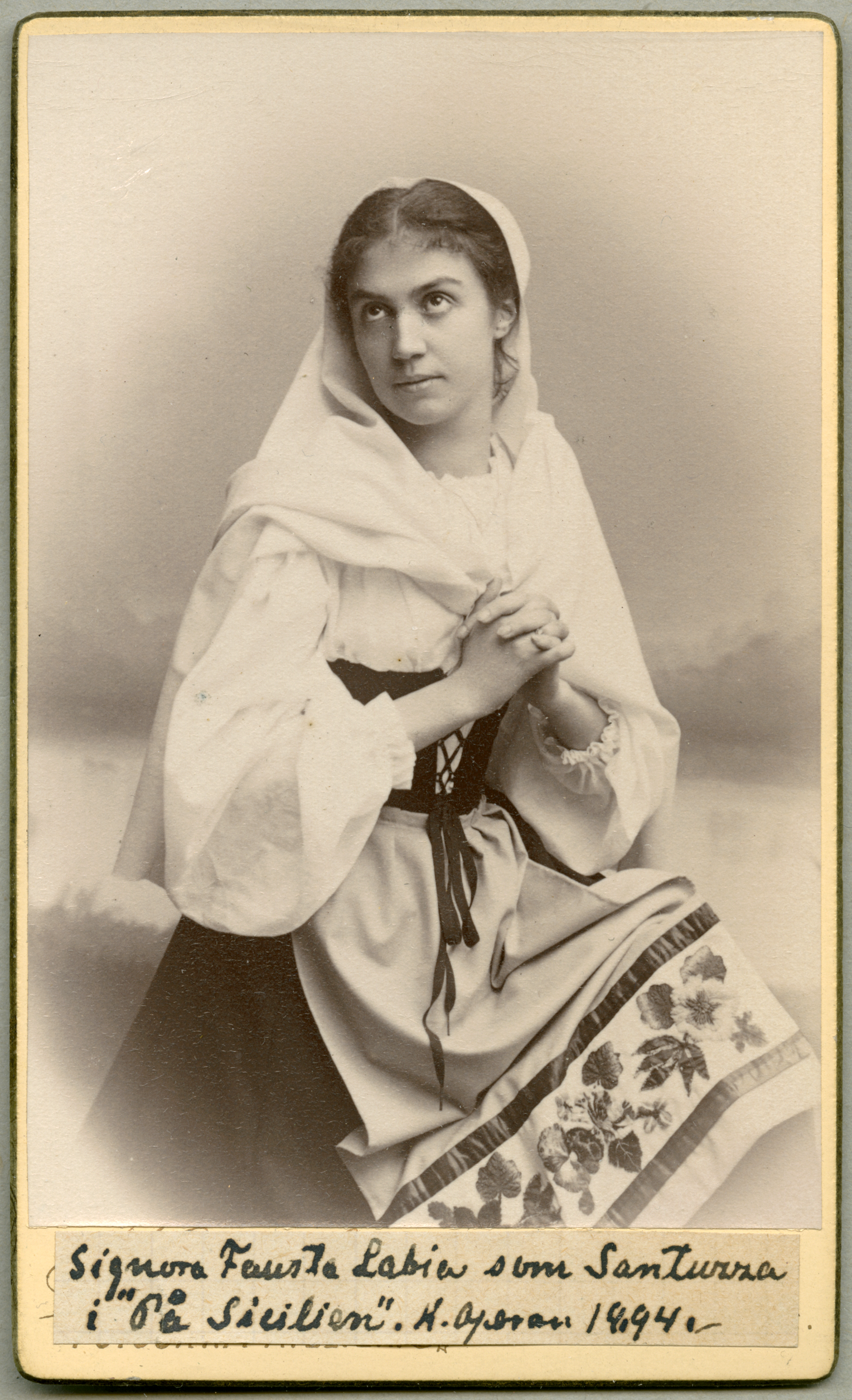
Fausta Labia as Santuzza (Stockholm 1894)

Fausta Labia (3 April 1870 – 6 October 1935) was an Italian operatic soprano who was active mainly from 1892 to 1908. She made her debut in Naples in April 1892 as Valentine in Meyerbeer's Les Huguenots. After engagements at the Royal Swedish Opera in Stockholm (1893–95) and Lisbon (1896), she returned to Italy where she performed first in Turin, Rome and Bologna. Thereafter notable performances included the title role in Mascagni's Iris at La Fenice in Venice (1900) and Sieglinde in Wagner's Die Walküre at Milan's La Scala (1901).

== Early life, education and family ==
Born in Verona on 3 April 1870, Fausta Labia was the daughter of the Venetian count Gianfrancesco Labia and his wife Cecilia née Dabalà who was a singer and voice teacher. Her younger sister Maria became a celebrated opera singer. She was trained by her mother and by the soprano Maria Spezia-Aldighieri. In 1907 she married the tenor Emilio Perea with whom she had a daughter, Gianna Perea-Labia (1908–1994), also an operatic soprano. The marriage was dissolved in 1911.

== Career ==
Labia made her debut at the Teatro di San Carlo in Naples on 10 April 1892 as Valentine in Meyerbeer's Les Huguenots. She performed at Verona's Teatro Filarmonico during the 1892–93 season, appearing as Isabelle in Meyerbeer's Robert le diable and as Margherita in Boito's Mefistofele.

The director of the Royal Swedish Opera, Axel Rundberg, engaged Labia for the 1893–94 season as a substitute for Carolina Östberg who was to tour the United States. She first appeared in September 1893 as both Margherita and Elena in Mefistofele, receiving acclaim from the audience. That November she appeared in the title role of Ponchielli's La Gioconda, followed by Santuzza in Mascagni's Cavalleria rusticana, Elisabeth in Wagner's Tannhäuser, Valentine, Leonora in Verdi's Il trovatore and the title role in his Aida. She also gave recitals, in particular in December 1893 when she enchanted the audience with Mendelssohn's aria "Infelice" accompanied by the Oslo Philharmonic. In the 1894–95 season, new roles included Adalgisa in Bellini's Norma, Donna Anna in Mozart's Don Giovanni and, in her final Stockholm appearance on 30 May 1895, Nedda in Leoncavallo's Pagliacci. In Sweden, she gained appreciation for her artistic delivery and her pleasant stagecraft.

Thereafter Labia spent a year at the Teatro São Carlos in Lisbon before returning to Italy to sing in Turin. In 1897, she appeared at the Neues Deutsches Theater in Prague, after which she sang in Trieste and Bologna. In 1898, Labia appeared at the Turin Italian Exhibition, contributing to the world premiere of Verdi's Quattro pezzi sacri, conducted by Arturo Toscanini in the presence of the composer. Among her most notable performances were the title role in Mascagni's Iris at La Fenice in Venice (1900) and Sieglinde in Wagner's Die Walküre at Milan's La Scala (1901). She spent much of her remaining career at the Teatro Costanzi in Rome where she specialized in Wagner roles. In 1902 she appeared as Brünnhilde in Wagner's Siegfried. After marrying Emilio Perea in 1907, she retired from the stage, but after her divorce in 1911 she appeared one last time in Buenos Aires as Eva in Wagner's Die Meistersinger von Nürnberg. She then became a voice teacher in Rome.

Fausta Labia died in Rome on 6 October 1935.
