= Maria Labia =

Italian operatic soprano

Maria Labia as Carmen

Maria Labia (14 February 1880, Verona – 10 February 1953, Malcesine, Lake Garda) was an Italian operatic dramatic soprano who was particularly associated with roles of the verismo repertoire.

== Career ==
Labia studied voice with her mother, Cecilia Labia, who was also an opera singer. She made her professional opera début in Stockholm in 1905 portraying the role of Mimì in Puccini's La bohème. Two years later she joined the Komische Oper Berlin where she sang numerous roles including the title role in Puccini's Tosca, the title role in Bizet's Carmen, Marta in Tiefland and the title role in Richard Strauss's Salome, among other roles. In 1908 she joined the Manhattan Opera Company in New York City with whom she sang roles for two years at the Manhattan Opera House. She then returned to Italy where she appeared with several theaters under independent contracts for several years. She joined the roster at La Scala in 1912 and joined the Paris Opéra in 1913. In 1916 she was imprisoned for a year in Ancona as a suspected German agent. Resuming her career after the war, she sang Giorgetta in the first European performance of Il tabarro (1919, Rome), repeating the role in that year in Buenos Aires. She also portrayed Felice in La Scala's first production of Wolf-Ferrari’s I quattro rusteghi (1922), a role that became her favourite and in which she continued to appear until 1936. Her performances in verismo operas were said to be impulsive and, for their day, ‘shamelessly sensual’. She used her warm, not especially large voice with particular reliance on the chest register. Some early recordings remain of her Tosca and Carmen.

Her elder sister Fausta (1870–1935) had a relatively short career (1892–1912), which included performances as Sieglinde under Toscanini at La Scala. She retired shortly after her marriage to the tenor Emilio Perea.

== Sources ==
- Harold Rosenthal: "Maria Labia", Grove Music Online ed. L. Macy (Accessed October 31, 2008), (subscription access)
