= Campo San Geremia =

Square in Venice, Italy

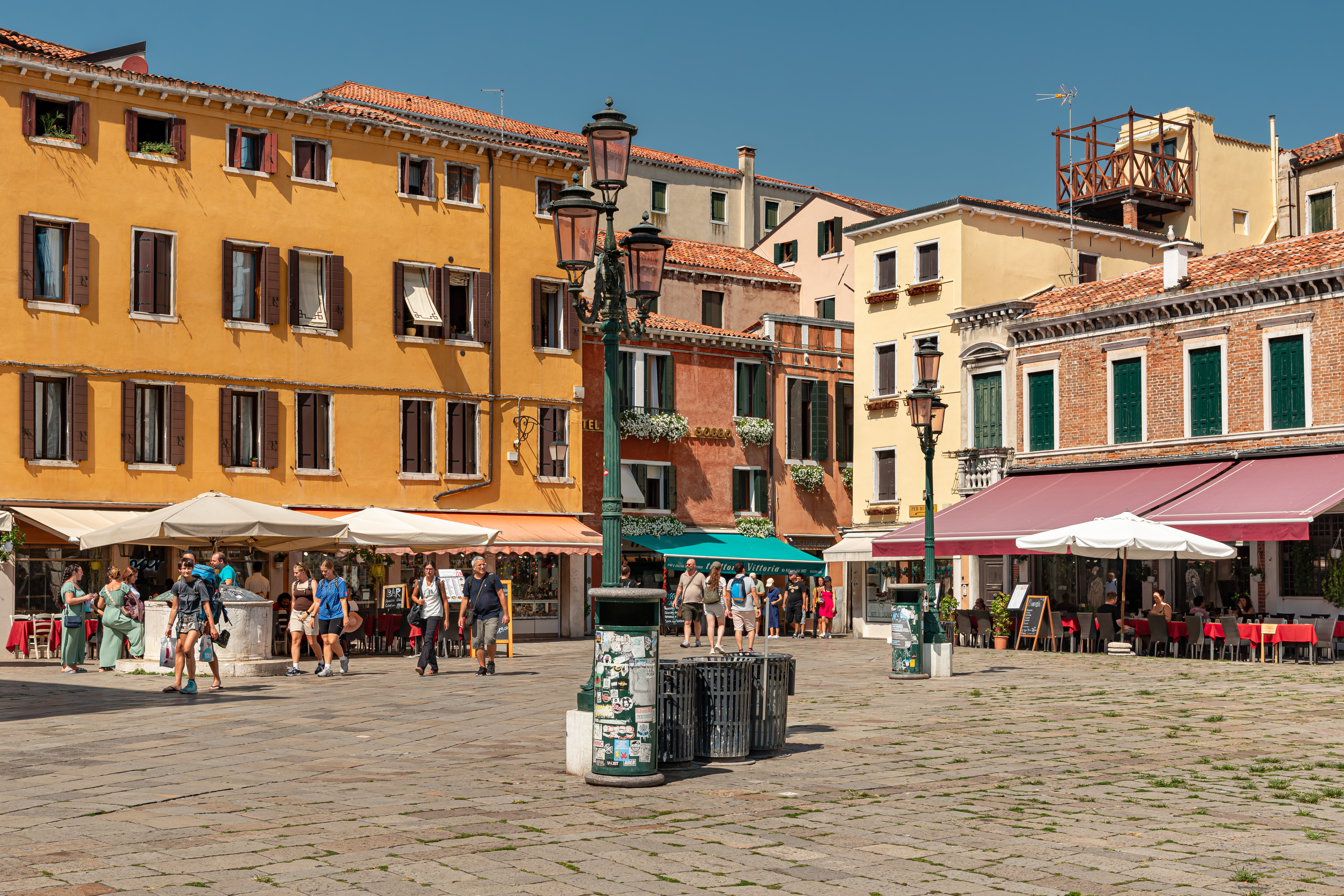
The square in 2024

Campo San Geremia is a square in Venice, Italy. It features an "unassuming" church, a "striking" palace, and an entrance to a park.
