= Maria Cecilia Guardi =

Italian art model, wife of Giovanni Battista Tiepolo

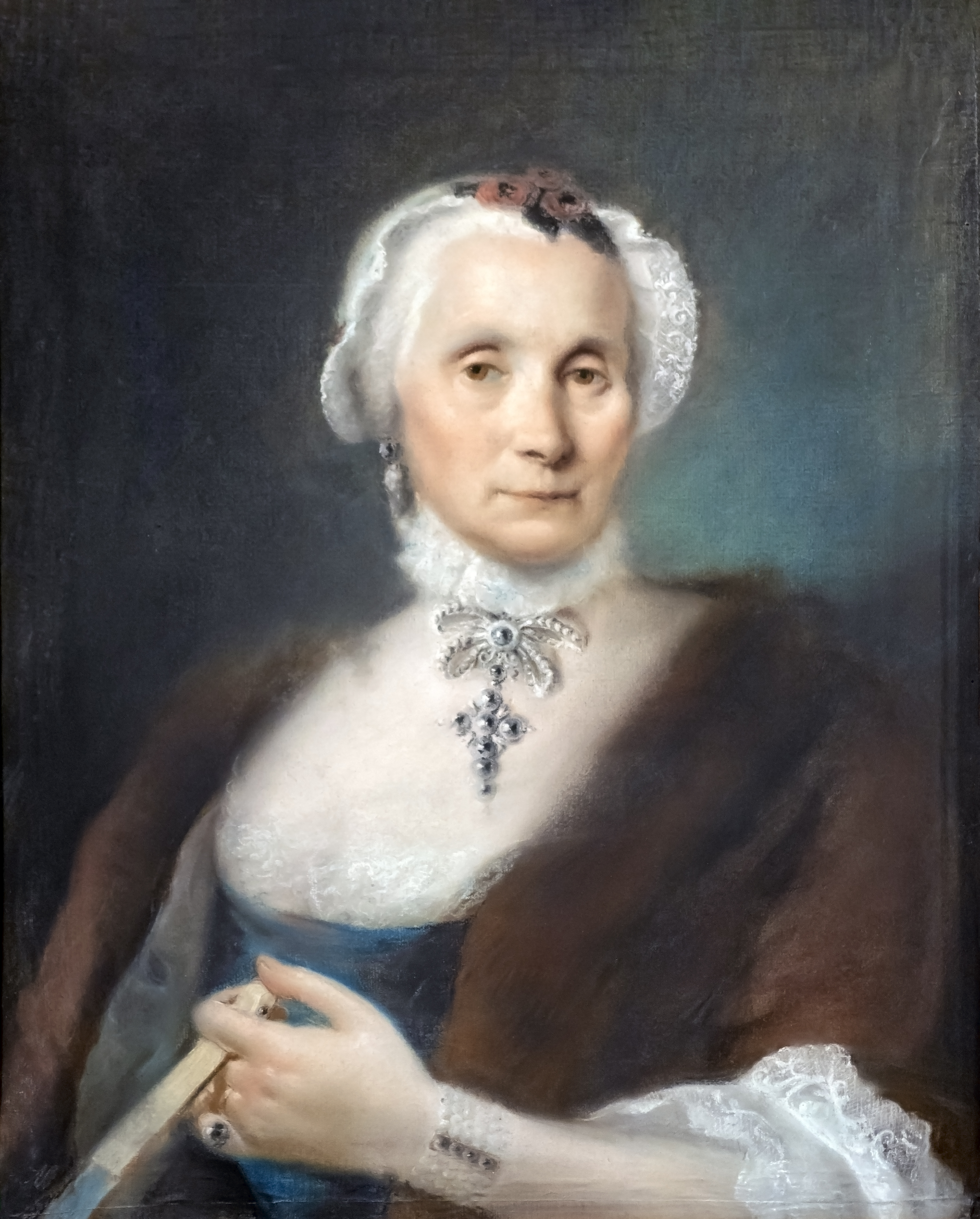
Maria Cecilia Guardi portrayed by her son Lorenzo Baldissera Tiepolo, Ca' Rezzonico Museum, Venice.

Maria Cecilia Guardi (Venice, 1702 – Venice, 1779) was a Venetian woman known to have been the wife of the rococo painter Giambattista Tiepolo and the model of many of his artwork. In other sources she's also remembered as Cecilia Guardi or Maria Cecilia Guardi Tiepolo.

== Biography ==
Born both as a daughter and sister of artist, her parents were the vedutist painter Domenico Guardi and Maria Claudia Pichler, meanwhile her brothers were Francesco, Giovanni Antonio and Giacomo. Orphaned young by her father and without dowry, at 17 years old she married in secret Giambattista Tiepolo on 21 november 1719, at the Santa Ternita church on the Castello part of Venice.

She was the principal model of many female figures in Giambattista Tiepolo's works, like Cleopatra on his masterpiece The Banquet of Cleopatra or Rachel in Rachel Hiding the Idols from her father. Their marriage produced ten children, of whom four daughters and three sons survived to adulthood, including the painters Giandomenico and Lorenzo, which they too adopted their mother as a model to some of their more intimate works, like Lorenzo's portrait of his mother in 1757, when she was 55 years old.

She became a widow in the year 1770, when her husband was in Spain for the frescos of the Royal Palace of Madrid.
