= The Immaculate Conception (Tiepolo) =

Painting by Giovanni Battista Tiepolo

- Artist: Giovanni Battista Tiepolo
- Year: 1767–1768
- Medium: Oil on canvas
- Dimensions: 115 cm × 170 cm (3' 10" in × 5' 5" in)
- Location: Prado Museum, Madrid

The Immaculate Conception is a painting by Italian painter Giovanni Battista Tiepolo (1696–1770). The painting was one of seven altarpieces commissioned in March 1767 from Tiepolo by King Charles III of Spain for the Church of Saint Pascual in Aranjuez, then under construction. This was originally an Alcantarine (Franciscan) monastery that was later assigned to the Conceptionist nuns.

The painting was commissioned in 1767, at a time when the Immaculate Conception was already a common theme in Ecclesiastical art, the Feast of the Immaculate Conception (8 December) having been restored to the Calendar of Saints in 1708, though its theology would not be definitively settled as dogma until Pope Pius IX's declaration in 1854. It represents the Immaculate Conception, a tradition of the Catholic Church stating that the Virgin Mary was conceived without original sin. It depicts the Virgin Mary, surrounded by angels and crowned with the circle of stars. She is shown trampling a snake, representing her victory over the devil. The lilies and the rose are references to hortus conclusus ("enclosed garden"), and symbolize Mary's love, virginity and purity. The painting is now in the Prado Museum, Madrid.

Tiepolo's altarpieces were transferred to the adjoining convent soon after they were installed in the church. They were replaced by an identically themed set by Anton Raphael Mengs, whose neo-classicism was more to Charles III's taste. Finally The Immaculate Conception was transferred to the Prado Museum in 1827.

== Painting ==
The imposing Baroque style of the painting is meant to evoke emotion. It was completed between 1767 and 1768. The depiction of the Virgin Mary is done according to traditional Christian iconography, and represents her Immaculate Conception, free from original sin. Standard iconographic elements include the dove above her, the stars around her head, her position on the crescent moon with a snake crushed under her feet, her hands held together in prayer, and the obelisk on her right.

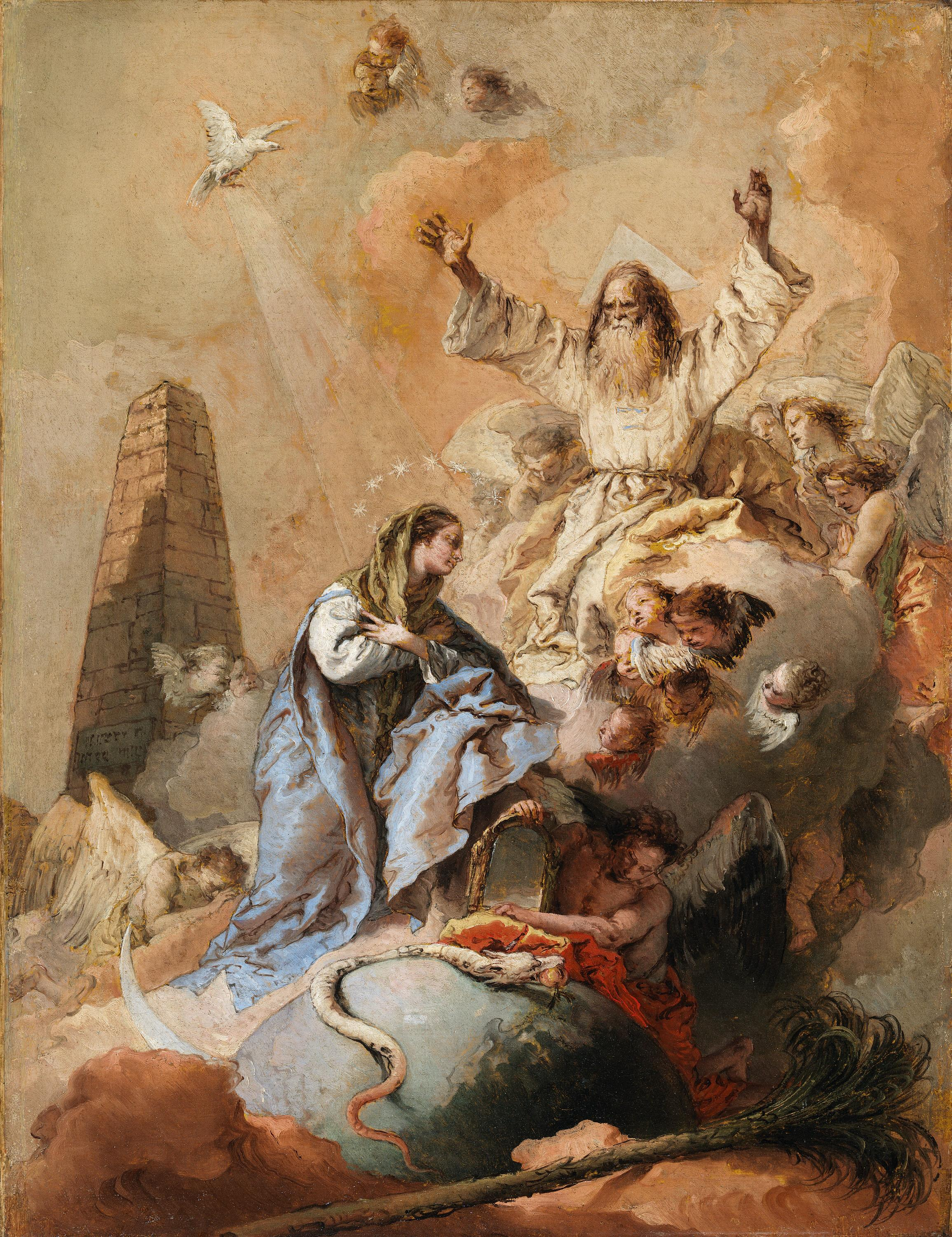
Allegory of the Immaculate Conception, c. 1769, National Gallery of Ireland

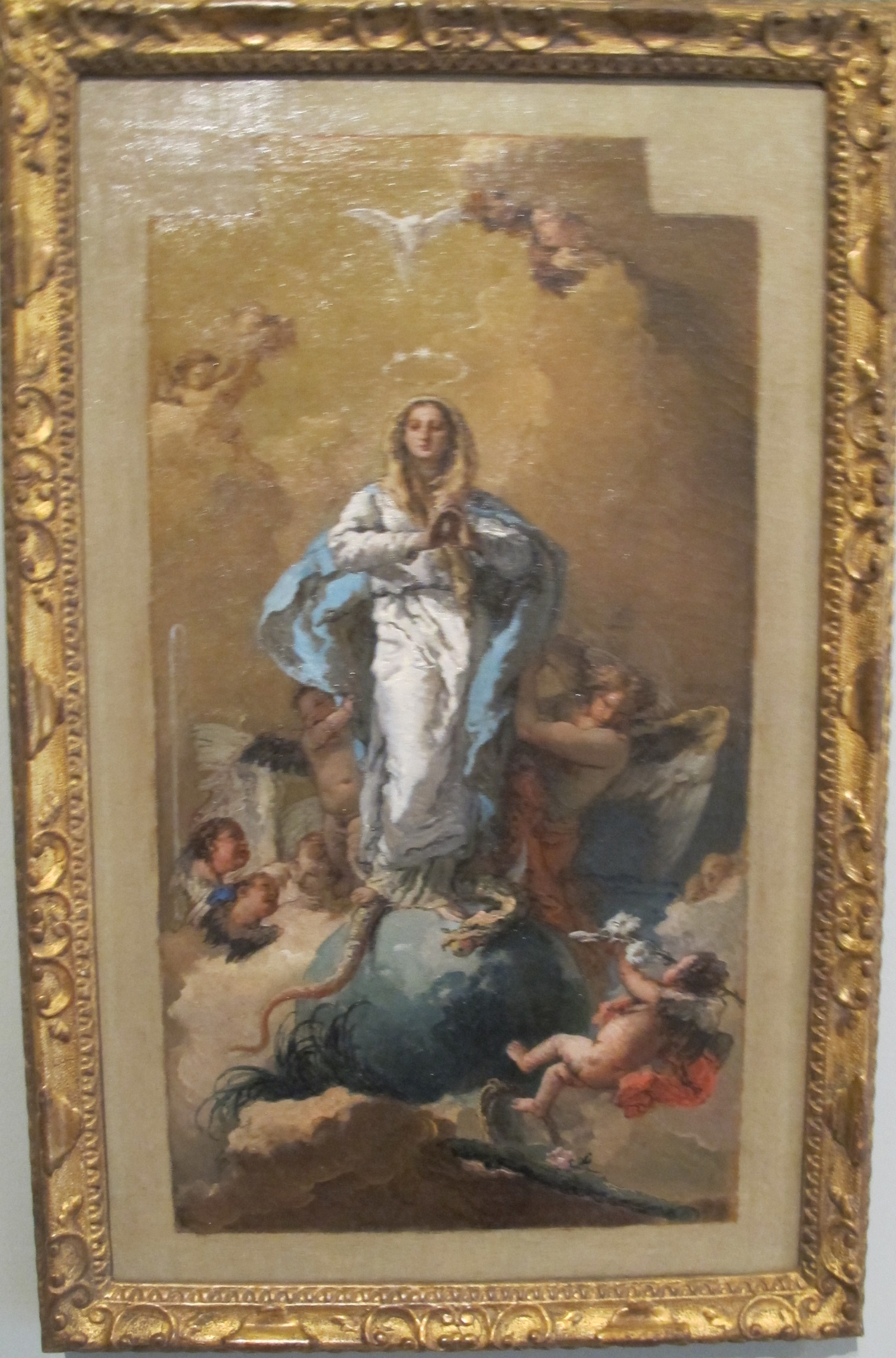
Modello, 1767, Courtauld Institute of Art

Additional iconography which accords to this theme include clouds, cherubs, lilies and a pink rose, flowers which are often associated with Mary. The dove above her head symbolizes the Holy Ghost, while the rose and the lilies are her customary symbols, lilies representing her purity, while the rose is the symbol for Mary, Queen of heaven and earth. Her girdle should be the cord of St. Francis.

The globe symbolizing the whole world, the crescent moon and the starry crown above her head are traditional symbols of the "woman clothed with the sun" (Virgo in Sole) described in Revelation 12:1-2. The crescent moon itself is an ancient symbol of chastity deriving from the Roman goddess Diana. Just as the moon derives its light from the sun, so Mary's special grace derives from the merits of Christ, her Son. The obelisk to her right also shimmers in the light of the sun and references traditional symbols of the Immaculate Conception associated with the Tower of David and the Ivory Tower, evoking impregnability, virginity and purity. Mary is depicted as trampling a serpent holding an apple in its mouth, representing the serpent in the Garden of Eden and Original Sin. A palm branch, and a mirror are seen under her feet. The palm branch signifies Mary's victory and exaltation, the mirror her purity.

Originating in Spain with Francisco Pacheco, the popularity of this particular representation of The Immaculate Conception spread across Europe. Tiepolo had painted an earlier version of the Immaculate Conception in 1734 for the Franciscan church of Santa Maria in Araceli in Vicenza. That version depicted the Virgin Mary as a beautiful young girl in the manner already established by Guido Reni and Bartolomé Esteban Murillo following Pacheco. The painting is now in Vicenza's civic museum at the Palazzo Chiericati. In the present version the depiction of Mary is rather more majestic and solemn in keeping with the Alcantarine tradition of austerity.

Tiepolo painted a set of five modelli for his altarpieces. These are now all at the Courtauld Institute of Art in London and are considered amongst his finest work. The modello for the Immaculate Conception differs from the final version in several respects. In the final version the figure of Mary occupies more space and lacks the muscular supporting angel on her left. That angel is thought to be a representation of the archangel Michael whose slaying of Lucifer prefigured Mary's role as an instrument of salvation. The angel is present in an oil sketch executed around the same time, now in the National Gallery of Ireland, considered iconographically the most complex of Tiepolo's depictions of the Immaculate Conception. Note the triangular halo signifying the Trinity.

== Background ==
Baroque art was meant to evoke emotion and passion instead of the calm rationality that had been prized during the Renaissance. Tiepolo's works, many of which are on an imposing scale, are also characterized by tension, exuberance, hedonism and intricate designs. Among Tiepolo's most popular works are mythological and religious themes conveying an atmosphere of grandeur and beauty.

== Provenance ==
- Church of S. Pascual Baylon, Aranjuez (1770–1775)
- Convent of S. Pascual Baylon, Aranjuez (1775–1827)
- Museo del Prado, Madrid (from 1827)

== See also ==
- Marian art in the Catholic Church
- Woman of the Apocalypse
- Virgo in Sole
