= Domenico Pasquini =

Italian painter

Domenico Pasquini (1740–June 29, 1798) was an Italian painter, active in Poland and the Russian Empire, where he painted a portrait of Catherine the Great. He was a pupil of Giovanni Battista Tiepolo in Venice. He died in Italy in 1798.

== Sources ==
- Zannandreis, Diego (1891). Giuseppe Biadego (ed.). Le vite dei pittori, scultori e architetti veronesi. Verona: Stabilimento Tipo-Litografico G. Franchini. p. 484.
