= Scipio Africanus Freeing Massiva =

Painting by Giovanni Battista Tiepolo

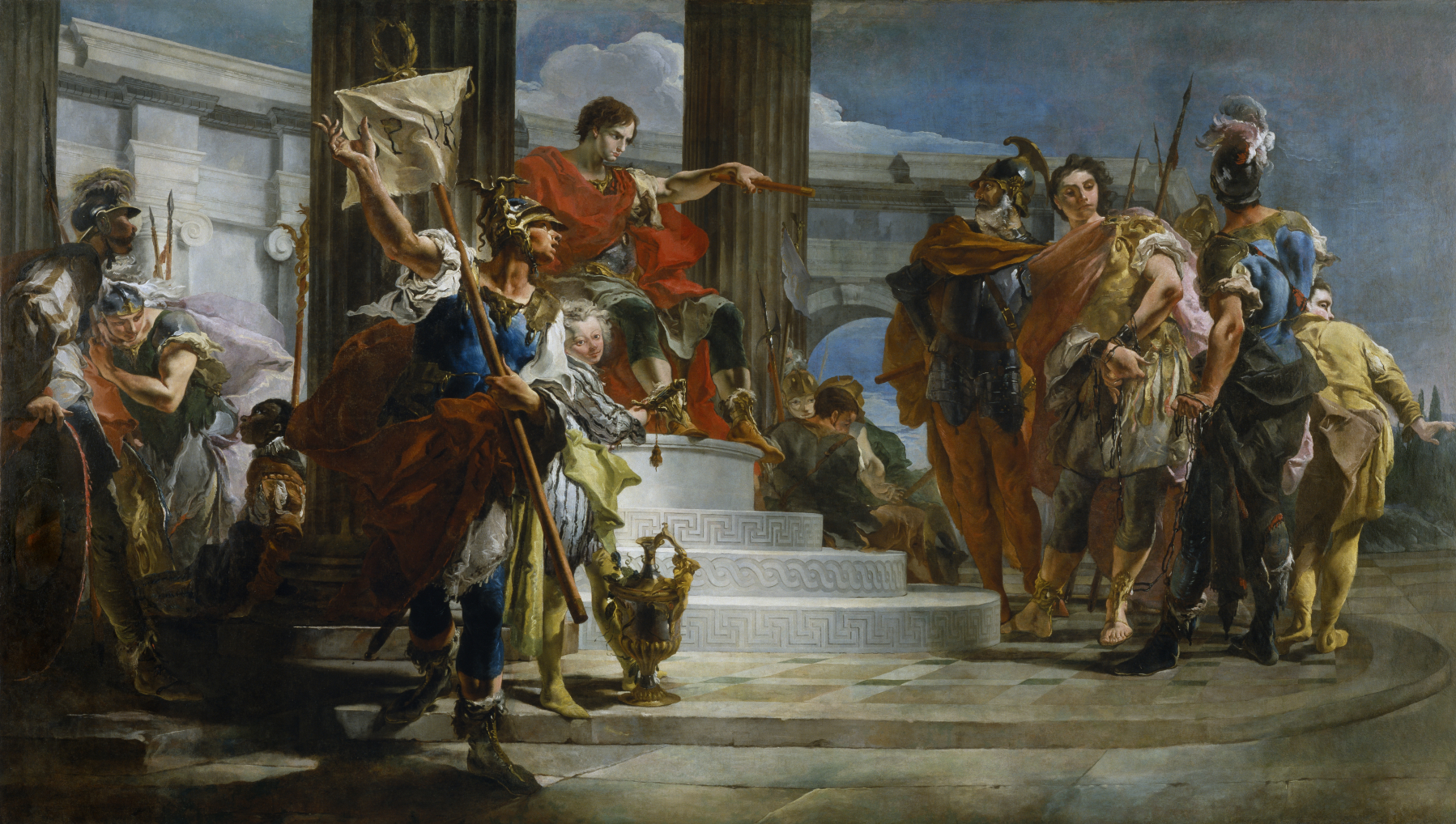
- Artist: Giovanni Battista Tiepolo
- Year: 1719–1721
- Medium: Oil on canvas
- Dimensions: 279.4 cm × 487.6 cm (110.0 in × 192.0 in)
- Location: The Walters Art Museum; Baltimore

Scipio Africanus Freeing Massiva (alt. Scipio Liberating Massiva) is a painting depicting a scene from ancient Roman history by the Venetian artist Giovanni Battista Tiepolo (alt. Giambattista Tiepolo), painted between 1719 and 1721. The painting depicts the Roman general Scipio Africanus after the 209 BCE Battle of Baecula in present-day Spain where he defeated the Carthaginians, capturing their Iberian and North African allies. The painting details the moment in which one of the captured Africans is brought before Scipio, who recognises him to be Massiva, the nephew of a chieftain of Eastern Numidia, Massinissa. Scipio reportedly frees Massiva, sending him home to his uncle laden with gifts and so winning Massinissa's loyalty for Rome.

Giovanni Battista Tiepolo (1696-1770) was an Italian painter and etcher most famous for his decorative fresco cycles. Tiepolo joined the Venetian painters’ confraternity in 1717 at twenty one years of age. His patrons included such people as doge Giovanni II Cornaro, archbishop Dionisio Dolfin of Udine, the Swedish ambassador Count Carl Gustaf Tessin and Charles III of Spain. Tiepolo died in Madrid while working for Charles III and his work quickly went out of style. Tiepolo's works, especially his frescoes, were developed through a process of drawings and oil sketching and then finally he would work onto the wall where the fresco would be. Tiepolo's work was famous, and is still highly regarded today, for his responses to the light at the site where the painting was to the executed and how this affected his processes.

== Composition ==
Tiepolo's use of oil paints achieves bright pearlescent colours, with vibrant reds and blues drawing attention over the somewhat subdued orange and yellow tones of much of the painting. Because few colours are highly saturated the strong red at the centre of the painting draws the eye directly to Scipio on the top of the central dais. Scipio's outstretched arm then leads the viewer's eye around the painting to the right.

This sight line is the basis of a pyramid, formed as the eye is then drawn to the left along the base of the painting by the sweeping curve of the dais. The rich blue in the costume of the standard bearer directly in the foreground then catches the eye and leads the viewer back to the top of the dais along the diagonal lines of his body. The figures on the right are bathed in a bright light which strongly contrasts the deep shadows and dark tones to the left of the painting. This helps to direct the gaze as the eye is drawn towards the brightly light space and then directed back to the centre, away from the darker areas.

The painting is separated into three sections by the dais at the base and the architectural feature towards the top, both of which use strong horizontal lines to create a defined central area of the painting. The colours and figures are confined to the central section of the painting where their diagonal and open stances create a strong sense of movement. The top and bottom sections of the painting are dominated by layered horizontal and vertical lines, in the floor tiles in the lower section and the architectural features in the top, that give the painting depth. Tiepolo's masterful use of foreshortening in the figures accentuates this depth.

== Historical context ==
During the 18th century the French took the lead as culture makers in Europe. The French courts lead the way in fashion, art and thought and most of Europe looked towards them as the strongest example of culture. As in the renaissance the world of art was fascinated by the ‘ancients’, with Ancient Roman history and culture being looked back upon and reflected in the art world. The French Académie royale de peinture et de sculpture (royal academy of painting and sculpture) founded in 1648 was a leading force in the production of art and had a strong impact on the rest of Europe. The 18th century was also a time of huge global exploration and trade making ‘exotic’ places such as Asia and Africa points of interest and fascination. This fascination with the exotic and the power of holding knowledge of the world outside of Europe was not found only in France, but can be seen all over Europe, including in Italy.

The original placement and patron of Scipio Africanus Freeing Massiva is unknown and so the reasons for the commissioning of the work remains unclear however looking at the image with ideas of material culture in mind it is possible to extrapolate at least the meanings that the patron wished to portray by the commissioning of the work. The fascination with Roman history and the prestige of history painting, especially in the French academy, means that this painting would probably have been held in high regard.

The decision to depict Scipio Africanus himself, however, gives the deepest insight into the meanings of the image. Scipio gained his fame in Rome through his exploration and conquering of areas of Africa for the Roman Republic. Scipio is here depicted as the benevolent and powerful conqueror, physically being raised above the other figures of the image and is the only figure to penetrate the upper third of the composition. Scipio's exploration of and power over the African continent has been used here to reflect and show off the patron's power and worldly knowledge.

== Off the Wall ==
In 2012 Scipio Africanus Freeing Massiva was featured in Off the Wall, an open-air exhibition on the streets of Baltimore, Maryland. A reproduction of the painting, the original is part of The Walters Art Museum collection, was on display at the Clarence M. Mitchell, Jr. Courthouse. The National Gallery in London began the concept of bringing art out of doors in 2007 and the Detroit Institute of Art introduced the concept in the U.S. The Off the Wall reproductions of the Walters' paintings are done on weather-resistant vinyl and include a description of the painting and a QR code for smart phones.
