= Giovanni Battista Tiepolo =

Italian painter (1696–1770)

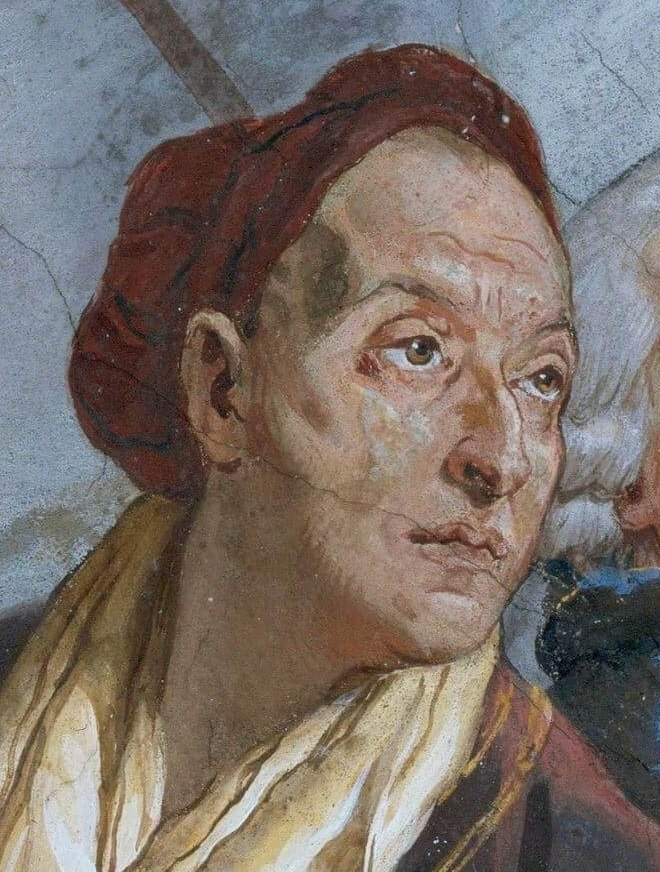
- Self-portrait (1750–1753), from the ceiling fresco in the Würzburg Residence
- Born: 5 March 1696; Venice, Venetian Republic
- Died: 27 March 1770 (aged 74); Madrid, Spain
- Other names: Gianbattista Tiepolo, Giambattista Tiepolo
- Known for: Painting
- Movement: Rococo

Signature
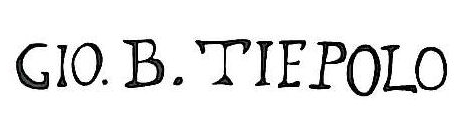

Giovanni Battista Tiepolo (/tiˈɛpəloʊ/ tee-EP-ə-loh, Italian: [dʒoˈvanni batˈtista ˈtjɛːpolo, ˈtjeː-]; 5 March 1696 – 27 March 1770), also known as Giambattista (or Gianbattista) Tiepolo, was an Italian painter and printmaker from the Republic of Venice who painted in the Rococo style, considered an important member of the 18th-century Venetian school. He was prolific, and worked not only in Italy, but also in Germany and Spain.

Giovan Battista Tiepolo, together with Giambattista Pittoni, Canaletto, Giovan Battista Piazzetta, Giuseppe Maria Crespi, and Francesco Guardi are considered the traditional Old Masters of that period.

Successful from the beginning of his career, he has been described by Michael Levey as "the greatest decorative painter of eighteenth-century Europe, as well as its most able craftsman".

== Biography ==
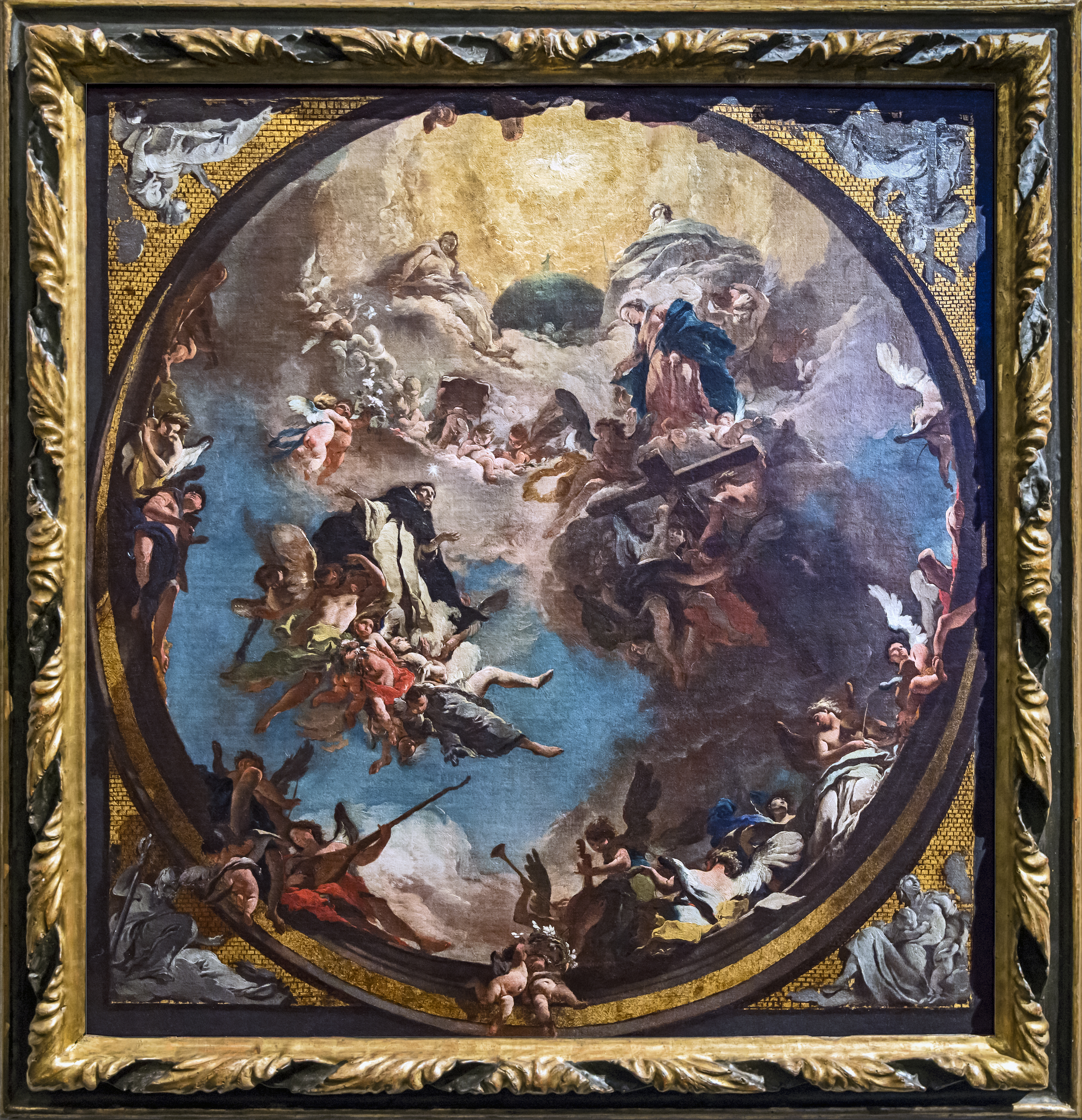
The Glory of St. Dominic, 1723

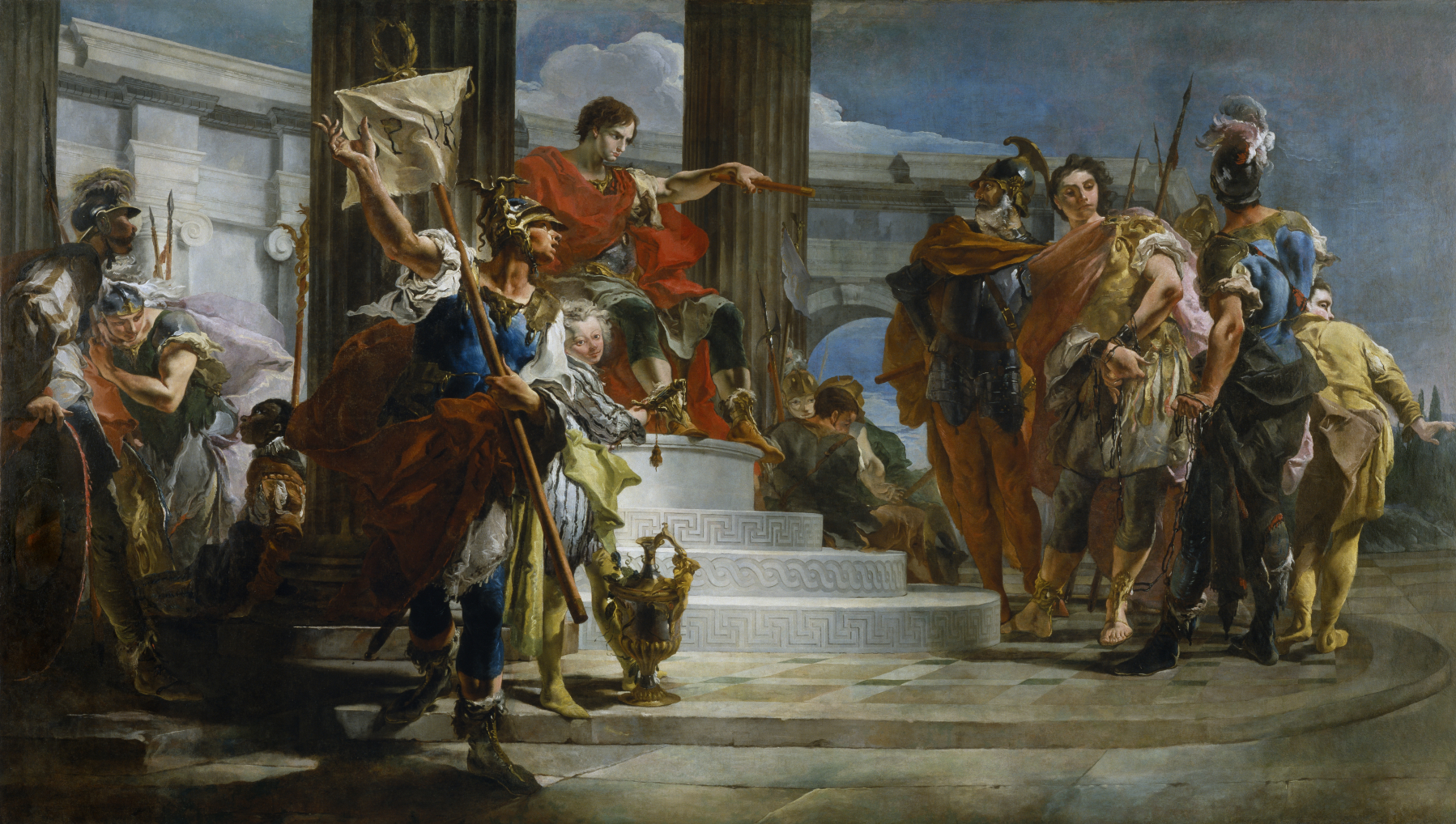
Scipio Africanus Freeing Massiva shows Massiva, the nephew of a prince of Numidia, being released after capture by Scipio Africanus. Walters Art Museum.

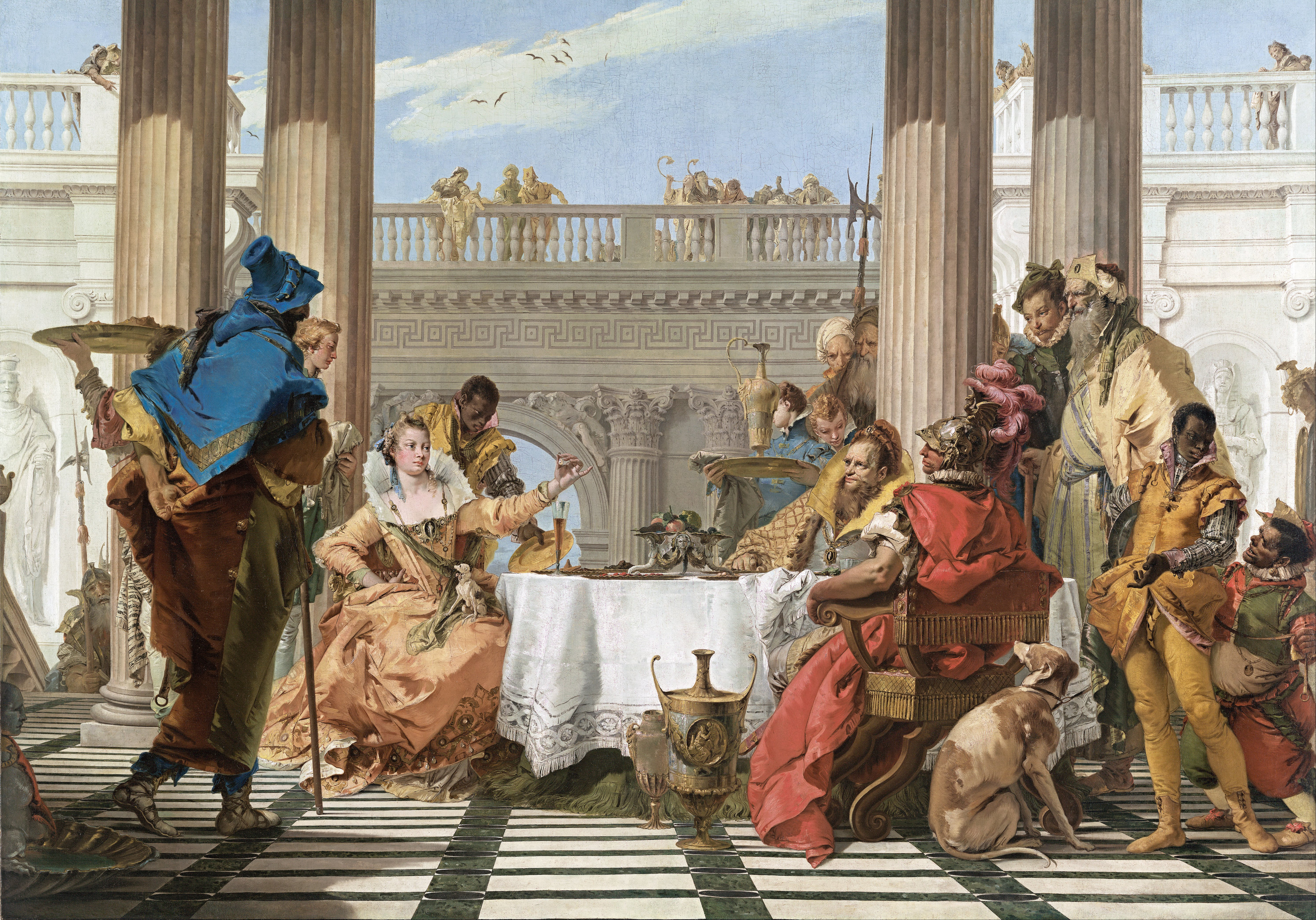
The Banquet of Cleopatra, 1743–44, National Gallery of Victoria, Melbourne

=== Early life (1696–1726) ===
Born in Venice, he was the youngest of six children of Domenico and Orsetta Tiepolo. His father was a small shipping merchant who belonged to a family that bore the prestigious patrician name of Tiepolo without claiming any noble descent. Some of the children acquired noble godparents, and Giambattista was originally named after his godfather, a Venetian nobleman called Giovanni Battista Dorià. He was baptised on 16 April 1696 in the local church, San Pietro di Castello (then still officially the cathedral of Venice). His father died about a year later, leaving his mother to bring up a family of young children, presumably in somewhat difficult circumstances.

In 1710, he became a pupil of Gregorio Lazzarini, a successful painter with an eclectic style. He was, though, at least equally strongly influenced by his study of the works of other contemporary artists such as Sebastiano Ricci, Giovanni Battista Piazzetta and Federico Bencovich, as well those of his Venetian predecessors, especially Tintoretto and Veronese. A biography of his teacher, published in 1732, says that Tiepolo "departed from [Lazzarini's] studied manner of painting, and, all spirit and fire, embraced a quick and resolute style". His earliest known works are depictions of the apostles, painted in spandrels as part of the decoration of Santa Maria dei Derelitti in Venice in 1715–6. At about the same time he became painter to the Doge, Giovanni II Cornaro, and oversaw the hanging of pictures at his palace, as well as painting many works himself, of which only two portraits have been identified. He painted his first fresco in 1716, on the ceiling of a church at Biadene, near Treviso. He probably left Lazzarini's studio in 1717, the year he was received into the Fraglia or guild of painters.

In around 1719–20, he painted a scheme of frescoes for the wealthy and recently ennobled publisher Giambattista Baglione in the hall of his villa at Massanzago near Padua. Tiepolo depicted the Triumph of Aurora on the ceiling, and the Myth of Phaethon on the walls, creating the kind of fluid spatial illusion which was to become a recurring theme in his work.

In 1722 he was one of twelve artists commissioned to contribute a painting on canvas of one of the apostles as part of a decorative scheme for the nave of San Stae in Venice. The other artists involved included Ricci, Piazetta, and Pellegrini.

=== Marriage and children ===
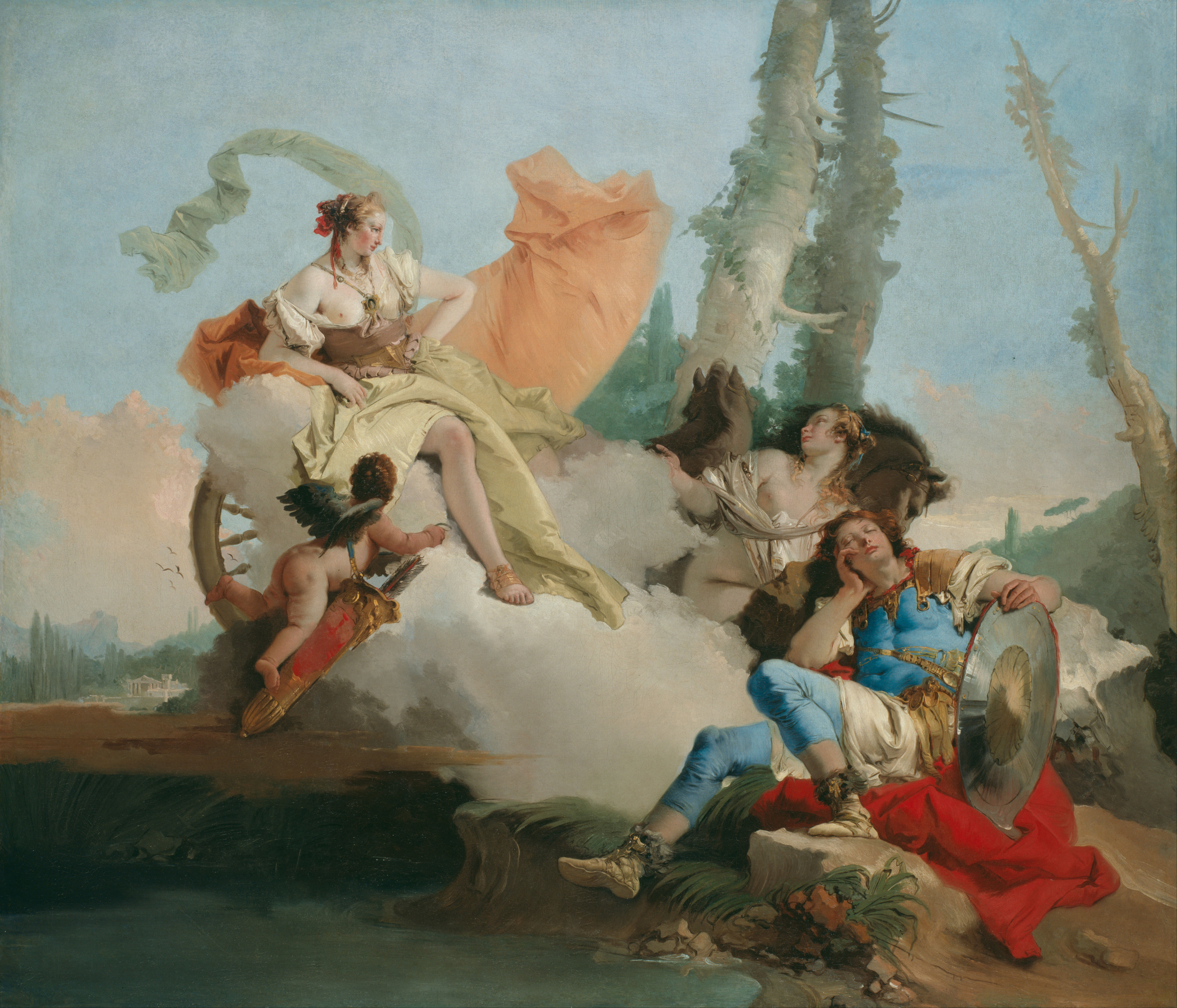
Rinaldo Enchanted by Armida, 1742–1745

In 1719, Tiepolo married noblewoman Maria Cecilia Guardi, sister of two contemporary Venetian painters, Francesco and Giovanni Antonio Guardi. Tiepolo and his wife had nine children, of whom four daughters and three sons survived to adulthood. Two of his sons, Giovanni Domenico and Lorenzo, painted with him as his assistants and later achieved some independent recognition, in particular Giovanni Domenico Tiepolo. His children painted figures with a design similar to that of their father, but with distinctive, including genre, styles. His third son became a priest. Fabio Canal, Francesco Lorenzi, and Domenico Pasquini were among his pupils.

=== Early mature work (1726–1750) ===
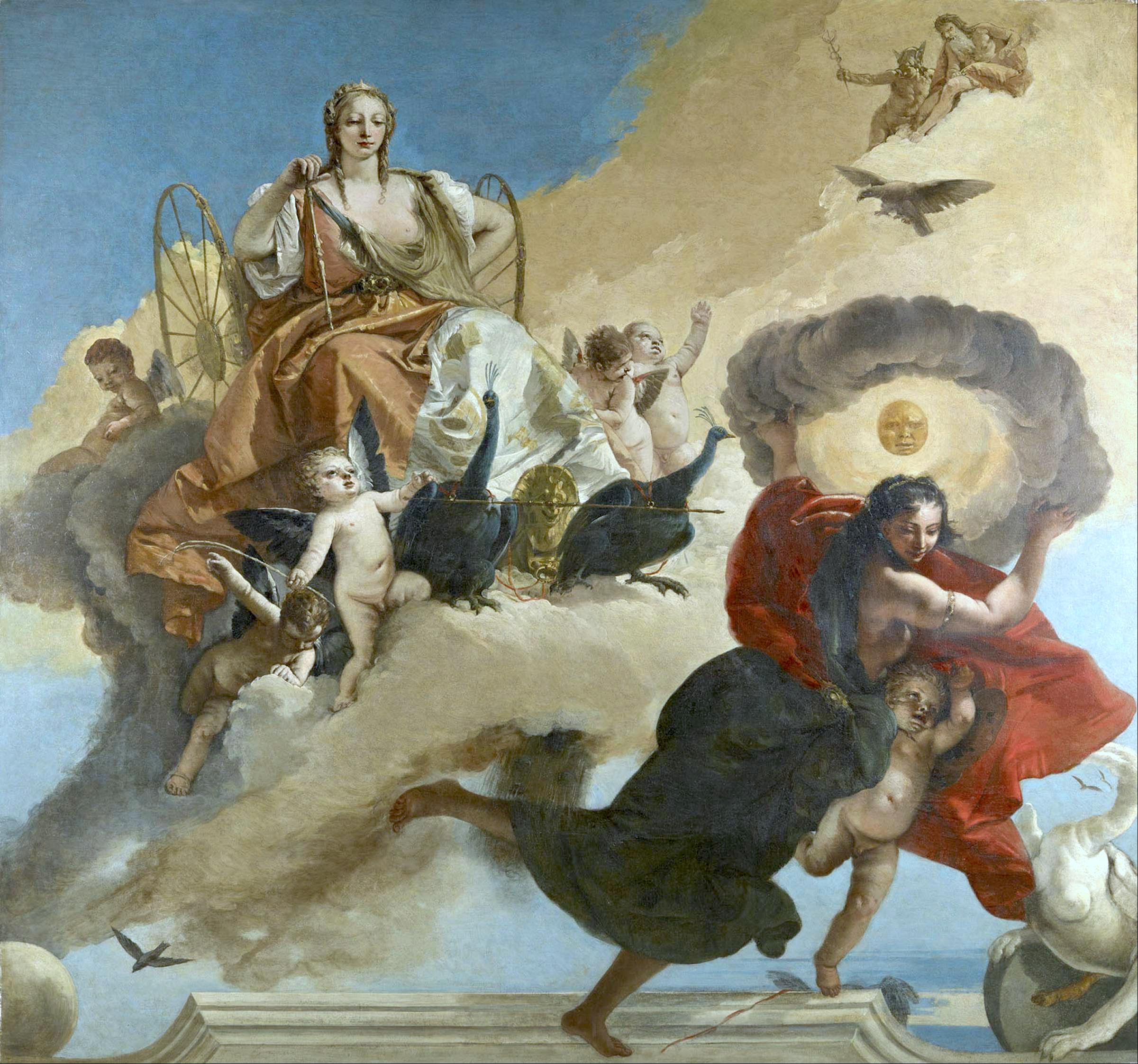
Juno and Luna, c. 1735–1745

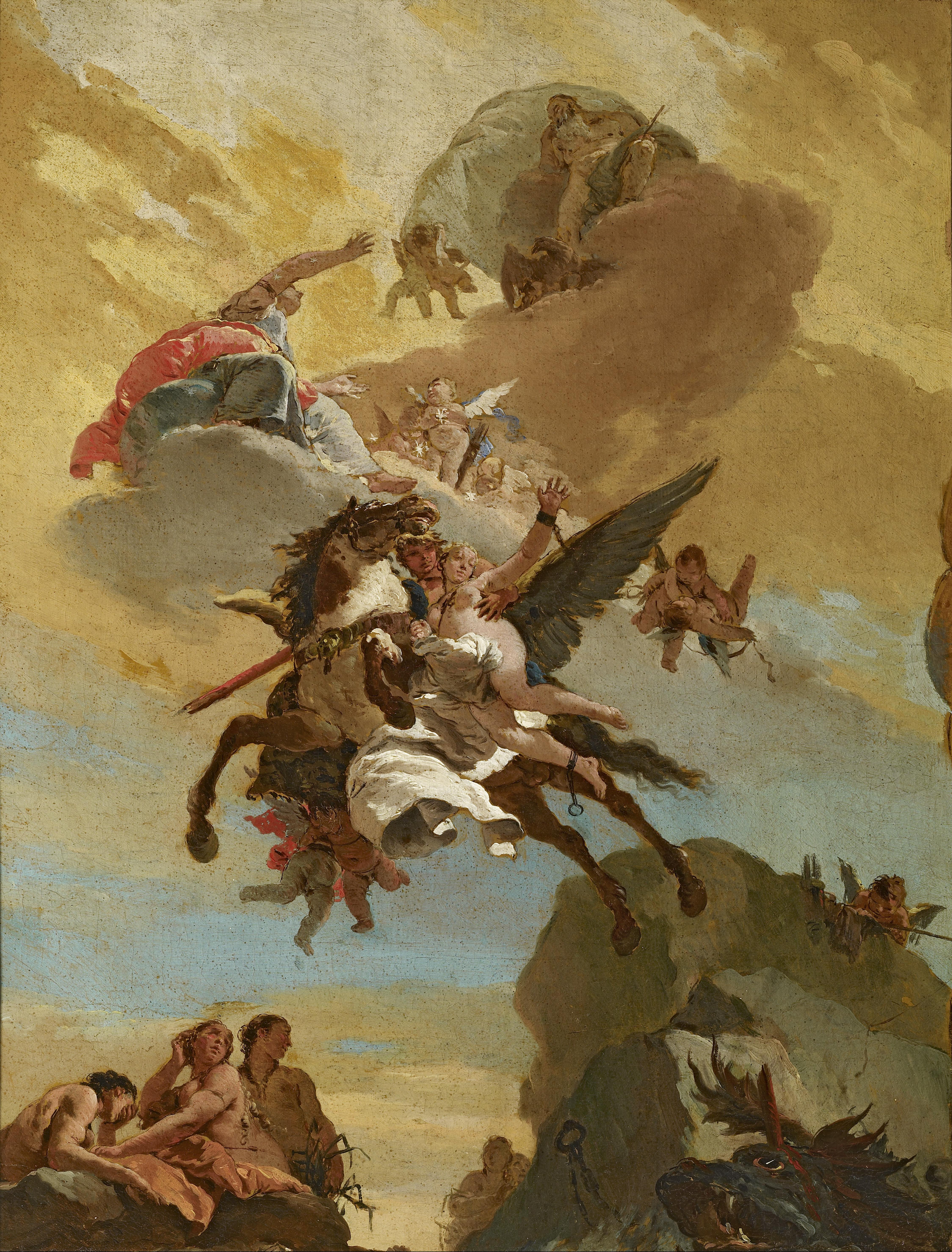
Perseus and Andromeda, c. 1730–1731

Some major commissions came from the patrician Dolfin family. Dionisio Dolfin, the Archbishop of Udine in Friuli, employed him to decorate a chapel in Udine Cathedral, and then to paint another cycle depicting episodes from the lives of Abraham and his descendants from the Book of Genesis at his archiepiscopal palace (the "Arcivescovado") (completed 1726–1728). Despite their elevated subject matter, they are bright in colour, and light-hearted in mood: Michael Levey describes the paintings at the palace as "a shimmering set of tableaux, full of wit and elegance". Tiepolo used a much cooler palette than previous Venetian painters, in order to create a convincing effect of daylight. His first masterpieces in Venice were a cycle of ten enormous canvases painted to decorate a large reception room of Ca' Dolfin on the Grand Canal of Venice (ca. 1726–1729), depicting battles and triumphs from the history of ancient Rome.

These early masterpieces, innovative amongst Venetian frescoes for their luminosity, brought him many commissions. He painted canvases for churches such as that of Verolanuova (1735–1740), for the Scuola Grande dei Carmini (1740–1747), in Cannaregio, a ceiling for the Palazzi Archinto and Palazzo Dugnani in Milan (1731), the Colleoni Chapel in Bergamo (1732–1733), a ceiling for the Gesuati (Santa Maria del Rosario) in Venice of St. Dominic Instituting the Rosary (1737–1739), Palazzo Clerici, Milan (1740), decorations for Villa Cordellina Molin, a ceiling for the Chiesa degli Scalzi (1743–1744); now destroyed (reconstitution :), Villa Cordellina Molin, Montecchio Maggiore (1743–1744) and for the ballroom of the Palazzo Labia in Venice (now a television studio), showing the Story of Cleopatra (1745–1750).

=== Etchings ===
Tiepolo produced two sets of etchings, the Capricci (c. 1740–1742) and the Scherzi di fantasia (c. 1743–1757). The ten capricci were first published by Anton Maria Zanetti, incorporated into the third edition of a compilation of woodcuts after Parmigianino. They were not published separately until 1785. The subject matter is often bizarre and fantastical, and the works owe a lot to the example of Salvator Rosa and Giovanni Benedetto Castiglione. The 23 Scherzi were etched over more than ten years and privately circulated, only being commercially published after Tiepolo's death, with numbers and titles added by his son, Giandomenico. Subjects include mysterious Eastern figures, and, in some of the later prints, scenes of necromancy.

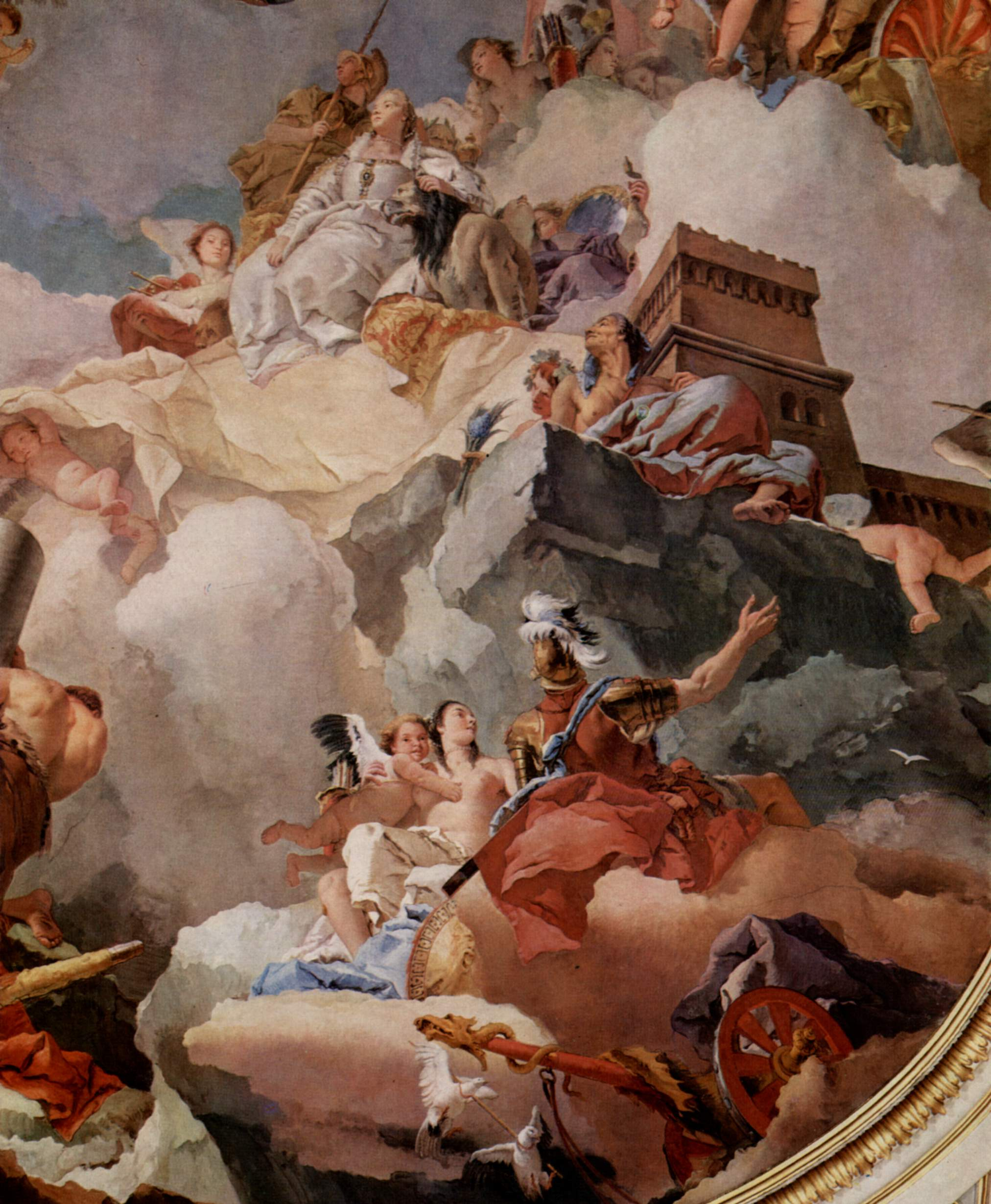
Apotheosis of Spain, 1762–1766, Royal Palace of Madrid

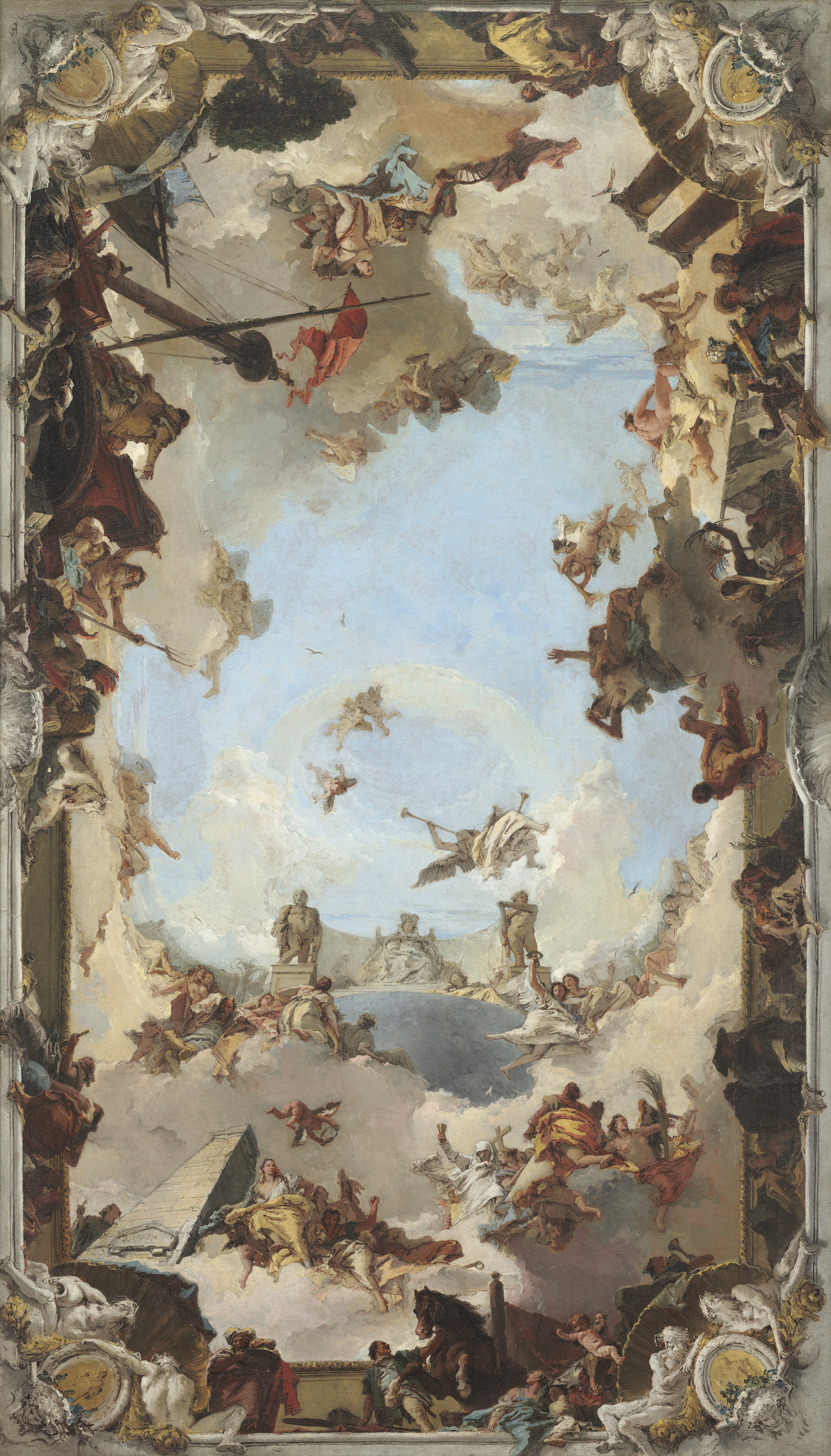
Wealth and Benefits of the Spanish Monarchy under Charles III, 1762, National Gallery of Art

=== Würzburg Residenz (1750–1753) ===
By 1750, Tiepolo's reputation was firmly established throughout Europe, with the help of his friend Francesco Algarotti, an art dealer, critic and collector. That year, at the behest of Prince-Bishop Karl Philipp von Greifenclau zu Vollraths, he traveled to Würzburg where he arrived in November 1750. He remained there for three years during which he executed ceiling paintings in the New Residenz palace (completed 1744). He frescoed the Kaisersaal salon in collaboration with his sons Giandomenico and Lorenzo and was then invited to deliver a design for the grandiose entrance staircase (Treppenhaus) designed by Balthasar Neumann. It is a massive ceiling fresco at 7287 square feet (677 m^{2}), and was completed in November 1753. His Allegory of the Planets and Continents depicts Apollo embarking on his daily course; deities around him symbolize the planets; allegorical figures (on the cornice) represent the four continents. He included several portraits in the Europe section of this fresco, including a self-portrait; one of his son Giandomenico; one of the prince-bishop von Greiffenklau; one of the painter Antonio Bossi; and one of the architect, Balthasar Neumann.

=== Return to Venice and the Veneto (1753–1770) ===
The Immaculate Conception, 1767–1768

Tiepolo returned to Venice in 1753. He was now in demand locally, as well as abroad where he was elected President of the Academy of Padua. He went on to complete theatrical frescoes for churches; the Triumph of Faith for the Chiesa della Pietà; panel frescos for Ca' Rezzonico (which now also houses his ceiling fresco from the Palazzo Barbarigo); and paintings for patrician villas in the Venetian countryside, such as Villa Valmarana in Vicenza and an elaborate panegyric ceiling for the Villa Pisani in Stra.

In some celebrated frescoes at the Palazzo Labia, he depicted two scenes from the life of Cleopatra: Meeting of Anthony and Cleopatra and Banquet of Cleopatra, as well as, in a central ceiling fresco, the Triumph of Bellerophon over Time. Here he collaborated with Girolamo Mengozzi Colonna. This connection with Colonna, who also designed sets for opera, highlights the increasing tendency towards composition as a staged fiction in Tiepolo's frescoes. The architecture of the Banquet fresco also recalls that of Veronese's Wedding at Cana. In 1757, he painted an altar piece for the Thiene family, representing the apotheosis of Saint Cajetan. It is in the church of hamlet of Rampazzo in the Camisano Vicentino.

=== Madrid ===
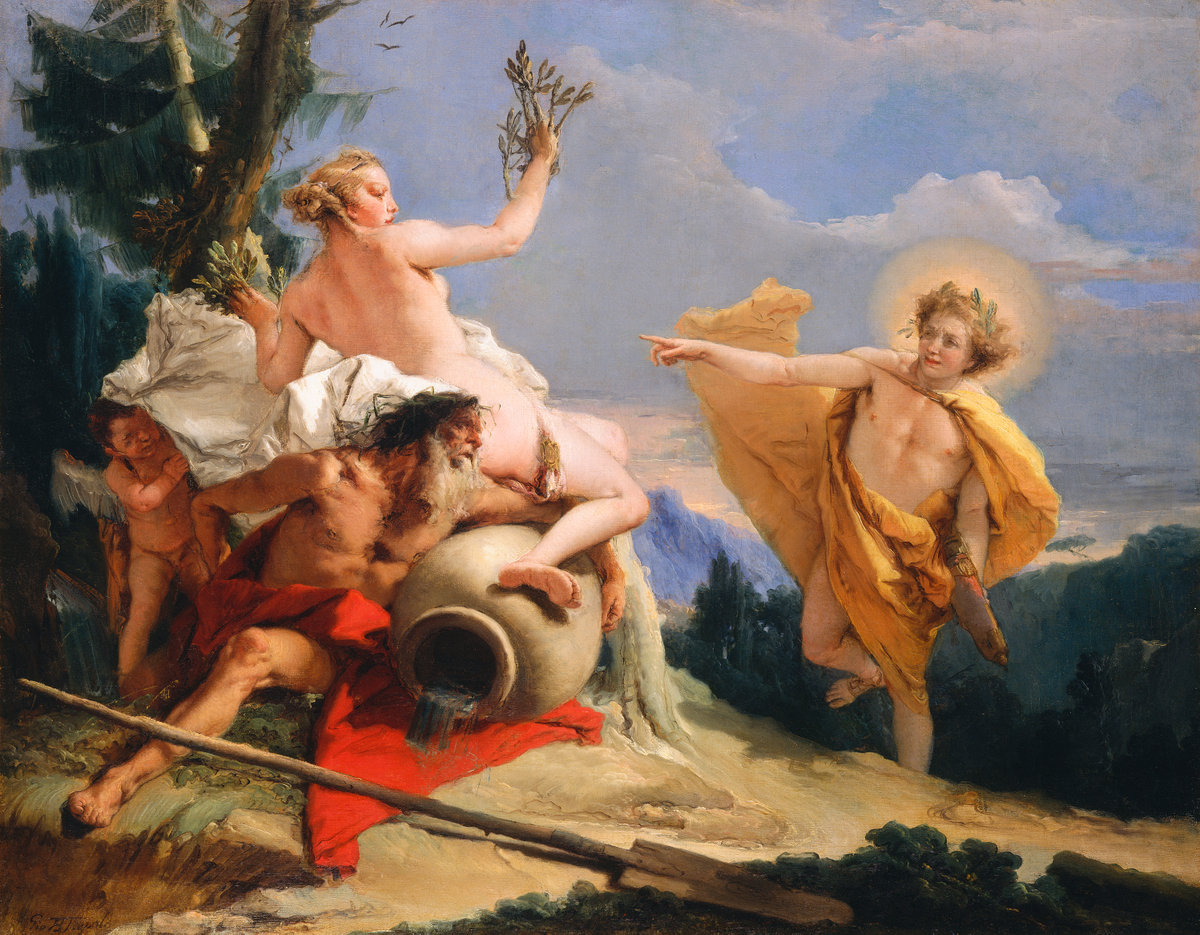
Apollo Pursuing Daphne, 1755–1760

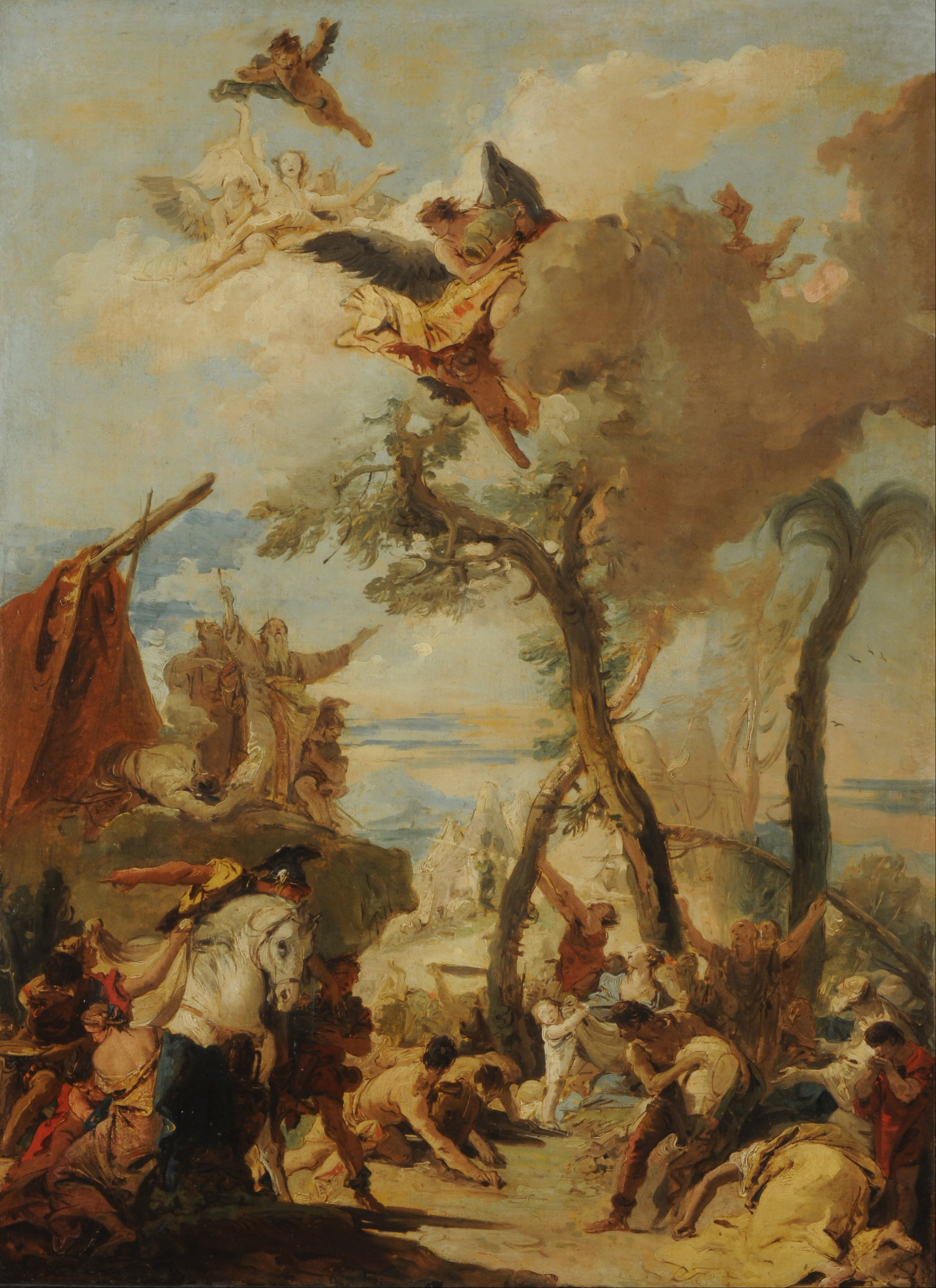
Manna in the desert

In 1761, King Charles III of Spain commissioned Tiepolo to create a ceiling fresco to decorate the throne room of the Royal Palace of Madrid. The panegyric theme is the Apotheosis of Spain and has allegorical depictions recalling the dominance of Spain in the Americas and across the globe.

He also painted two other ceilings in the palace, and carried out many private commissions in Spain. However, he suffered from the jealousy and the bitter opposition of the rising champion of Neoclassicism, Anton Raphael Mengs; at the instigation of Mengs' supporter, the King's confessor Joaquim de Electa, had Tiepolo's series of canvases for the church of San Pascual at Aranjuez replaced by works by his favourite.

=== Death ===
Tiepolo died in Madrid on 27 March 1770. He is buried in Madonna dell'Orto in Venice.

After his death, the rise of a stern Neoclassicism and the post-revolutionary decline of absolutism led to the slow decline of the Rococo style associated with his name, but failed to dent his reputation. In 1772, Tiepolo's son was sufficiently respected to be painter to Doge Giovanni II Cornaro, in charge of the decoration of Palazzo Mocenigo in the sestiere of San Polo, Venice.

== Gallery ==
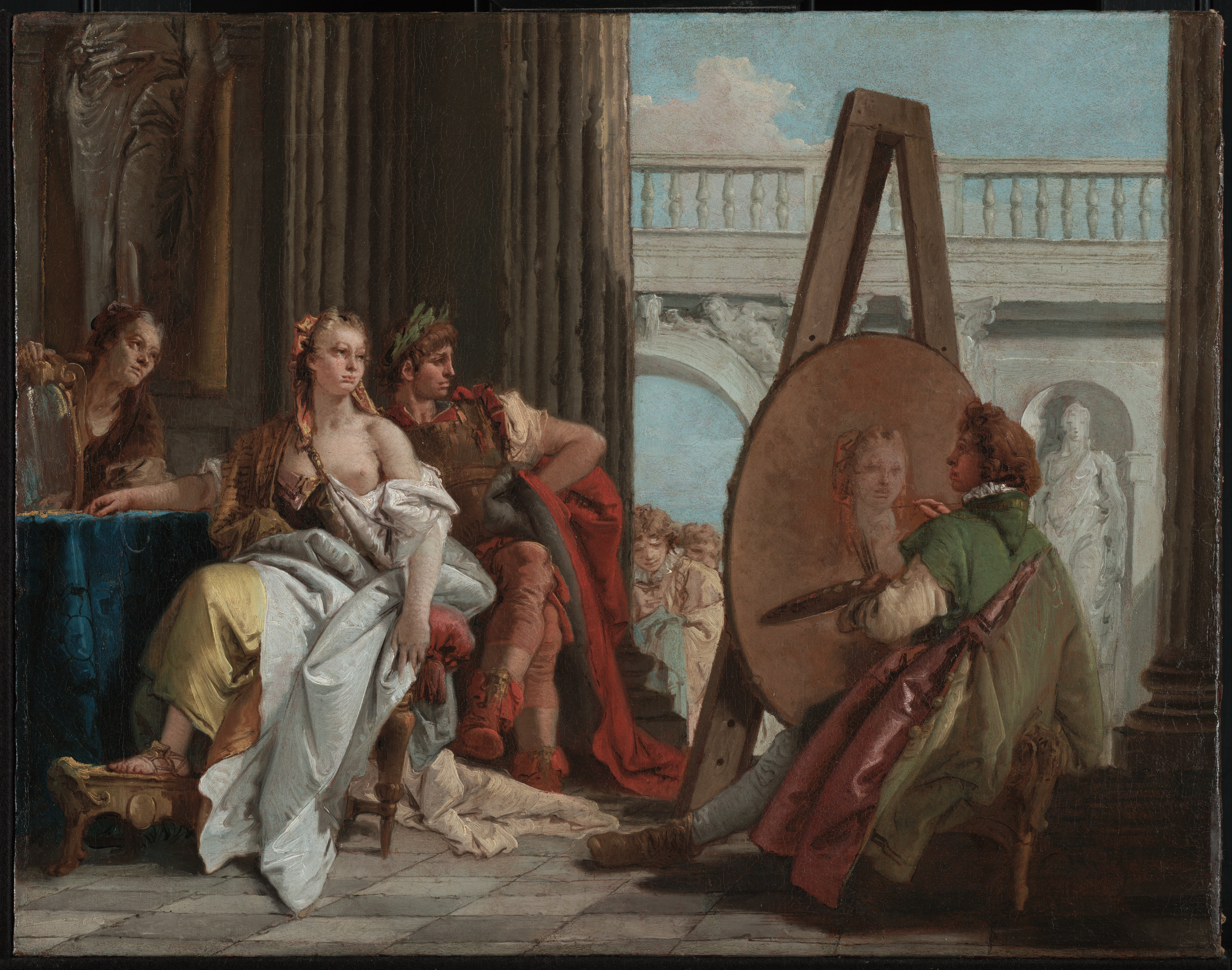
Alexander the Great and Campaspe in the Studio of Apelles, 1740

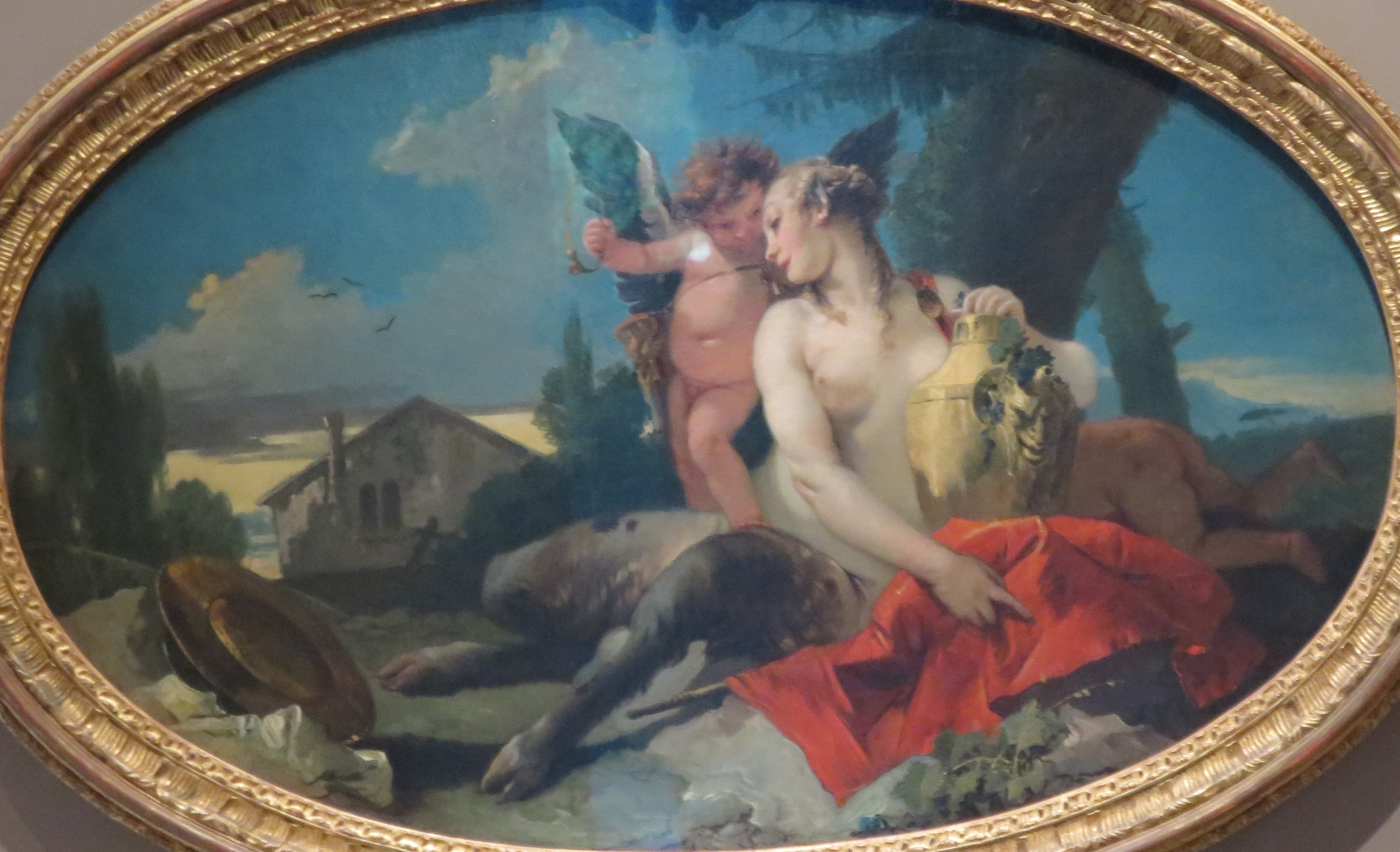
Satyress with a Putto, c. 1740–1742, Norton Simon Museum

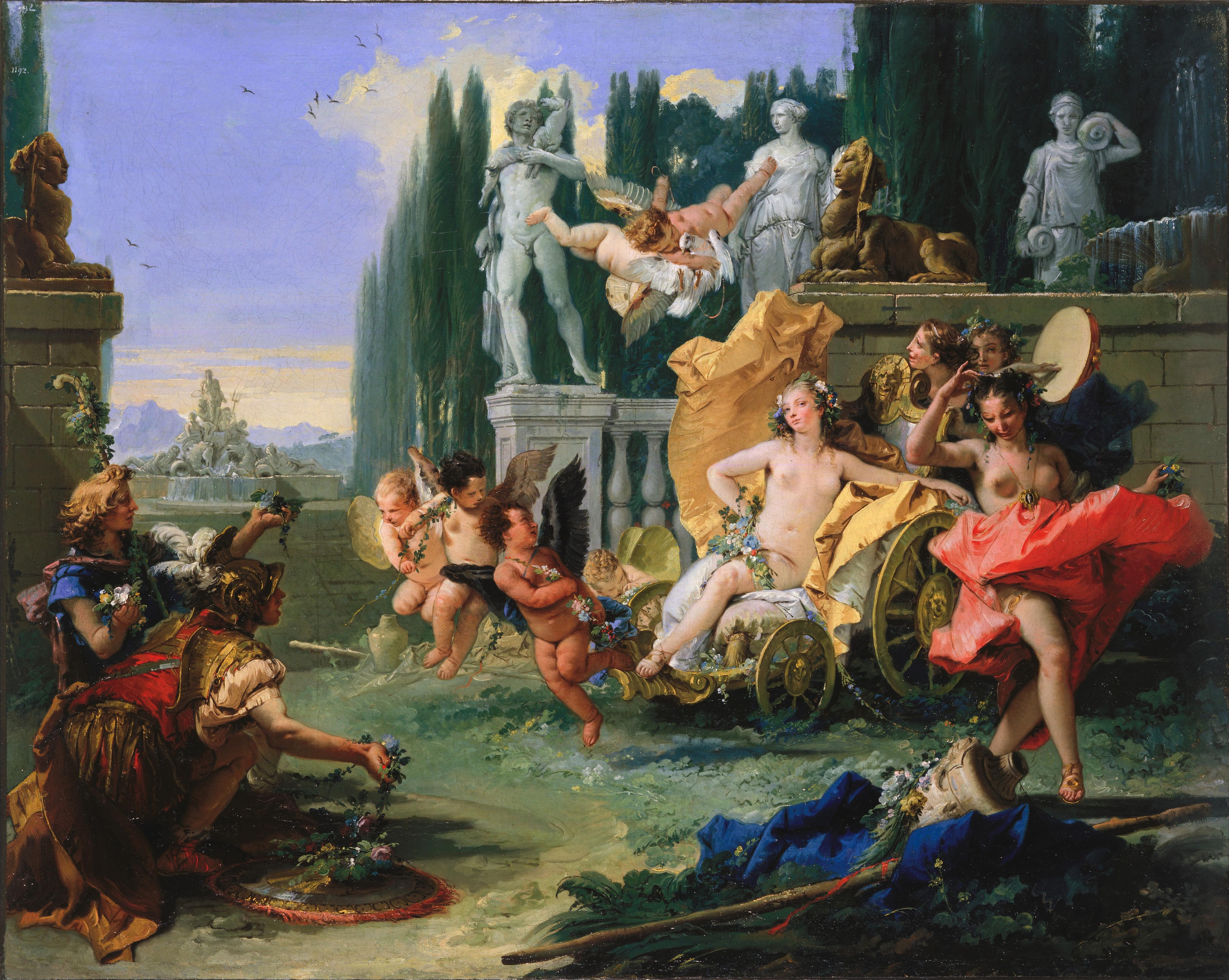
The Empire of Flora, c. 1743, Fine Arts Museums of San Francisco

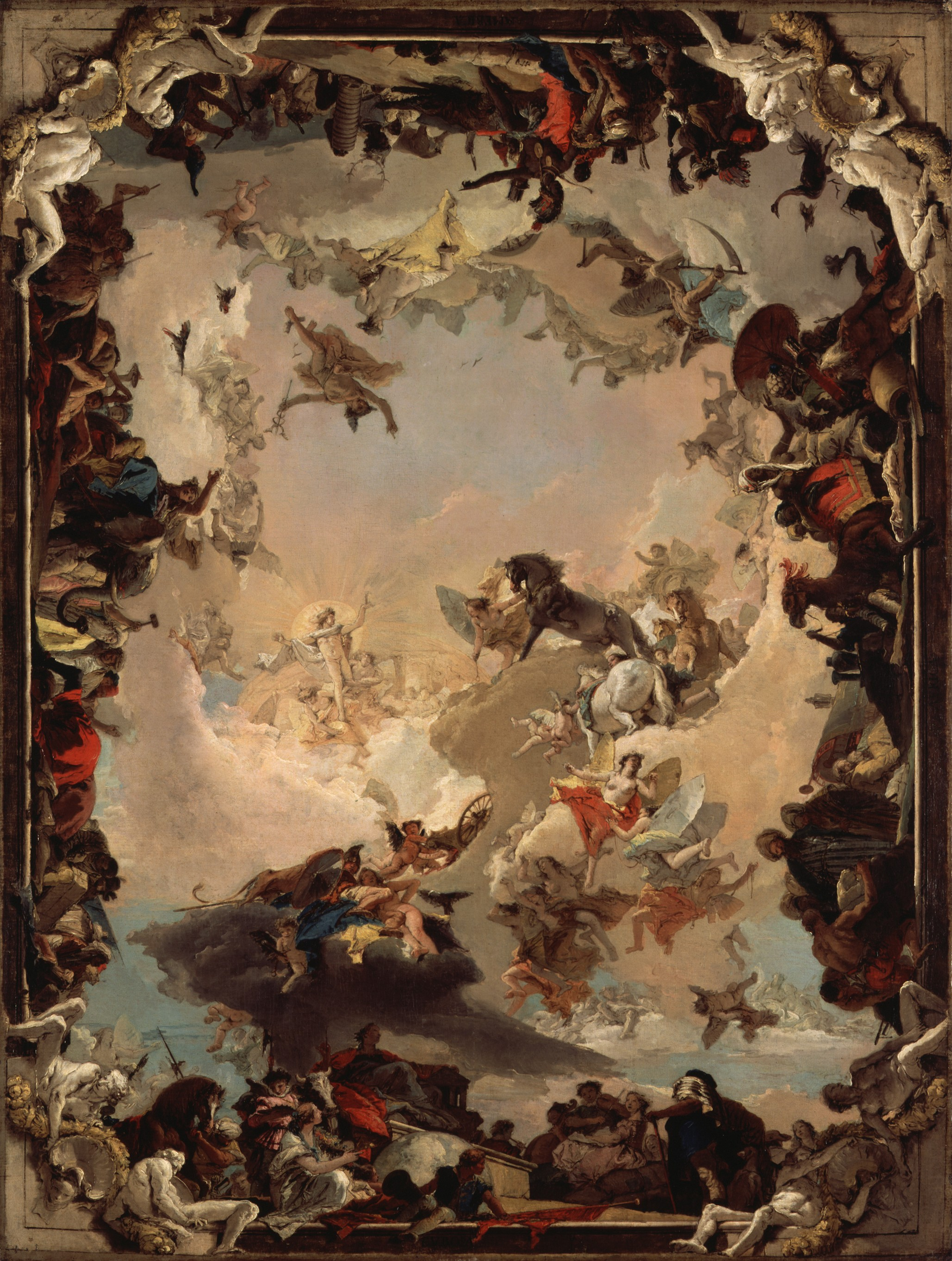
Allegory of the Planets and Continents, 1752

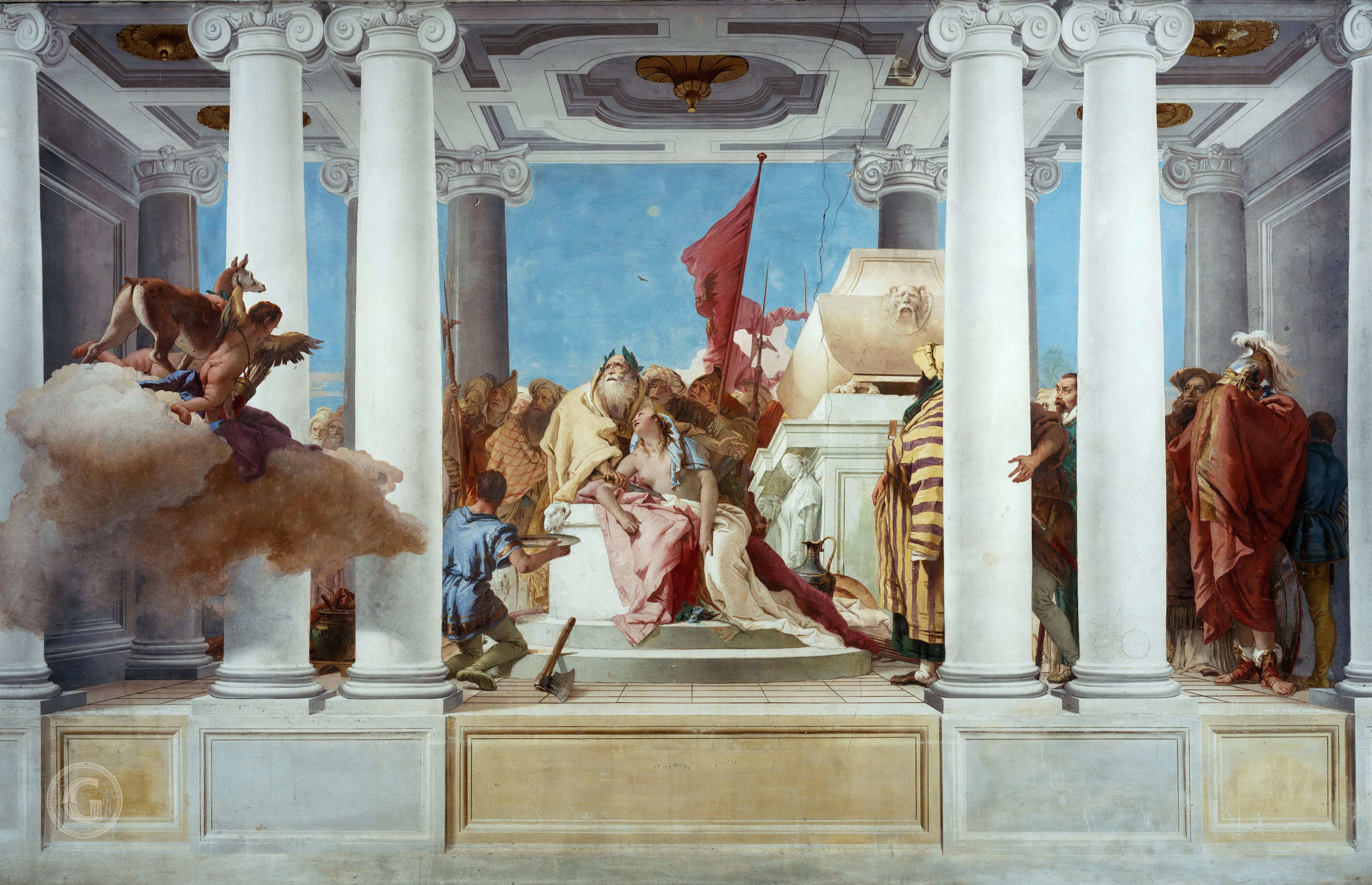
The Sacrifice of Iphigenia, 1757, Villa Valmarana

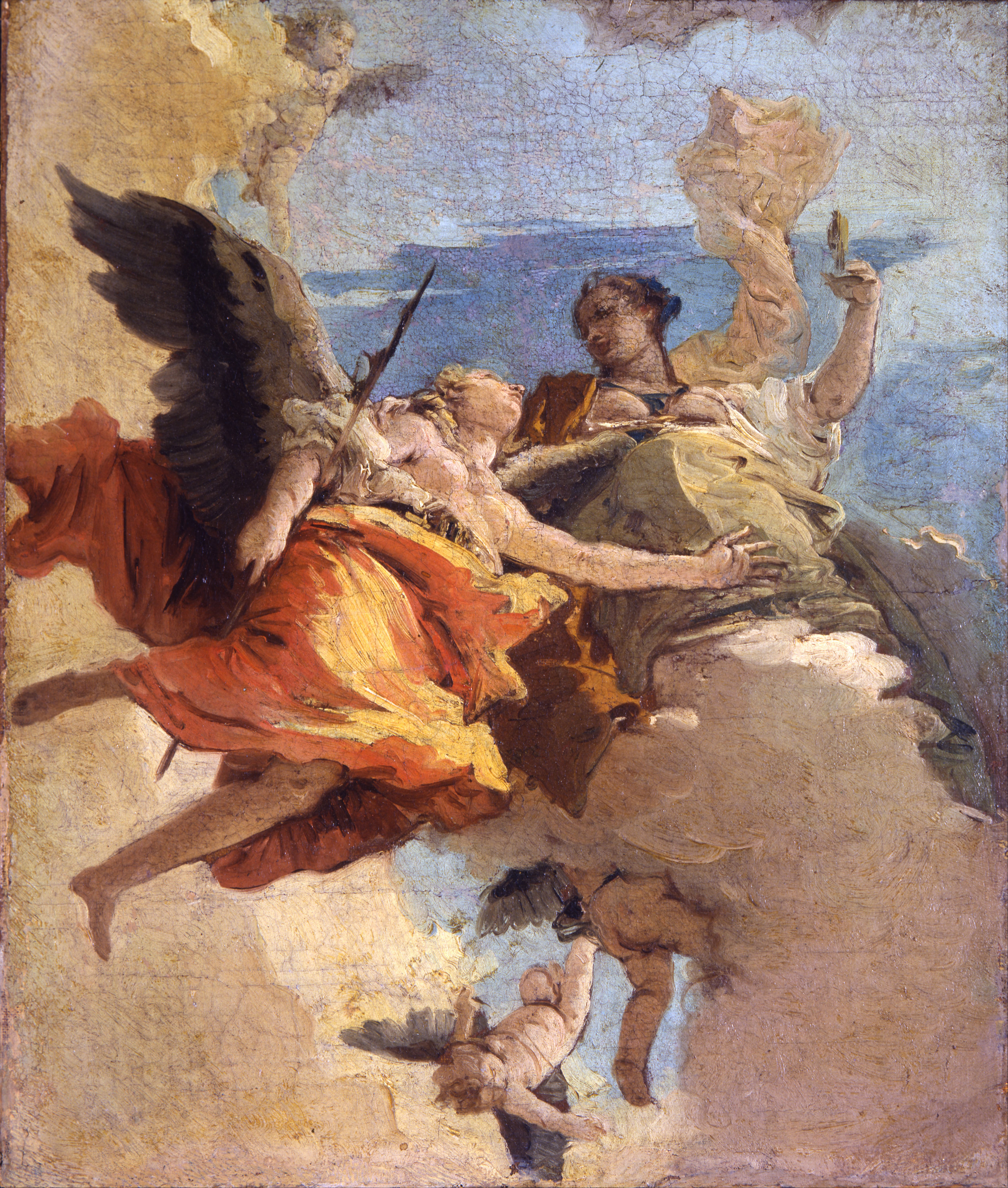
Allegory of Virtue and Nobility (Allegory of Strength and Wisdom), c. 1740–1750, Museo Poldi Pezzoli

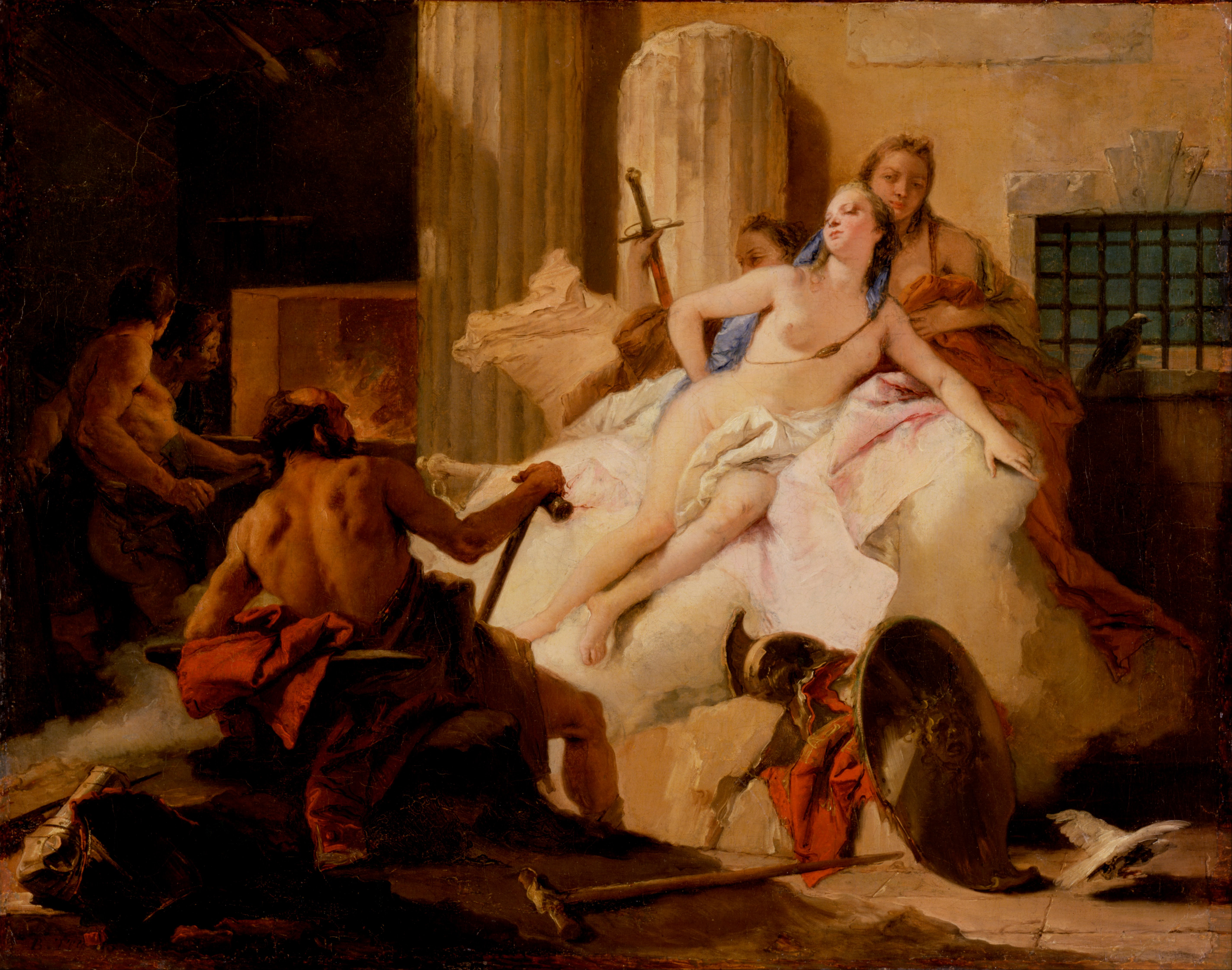
Sketch for Venus and Vulcan, 1765–66

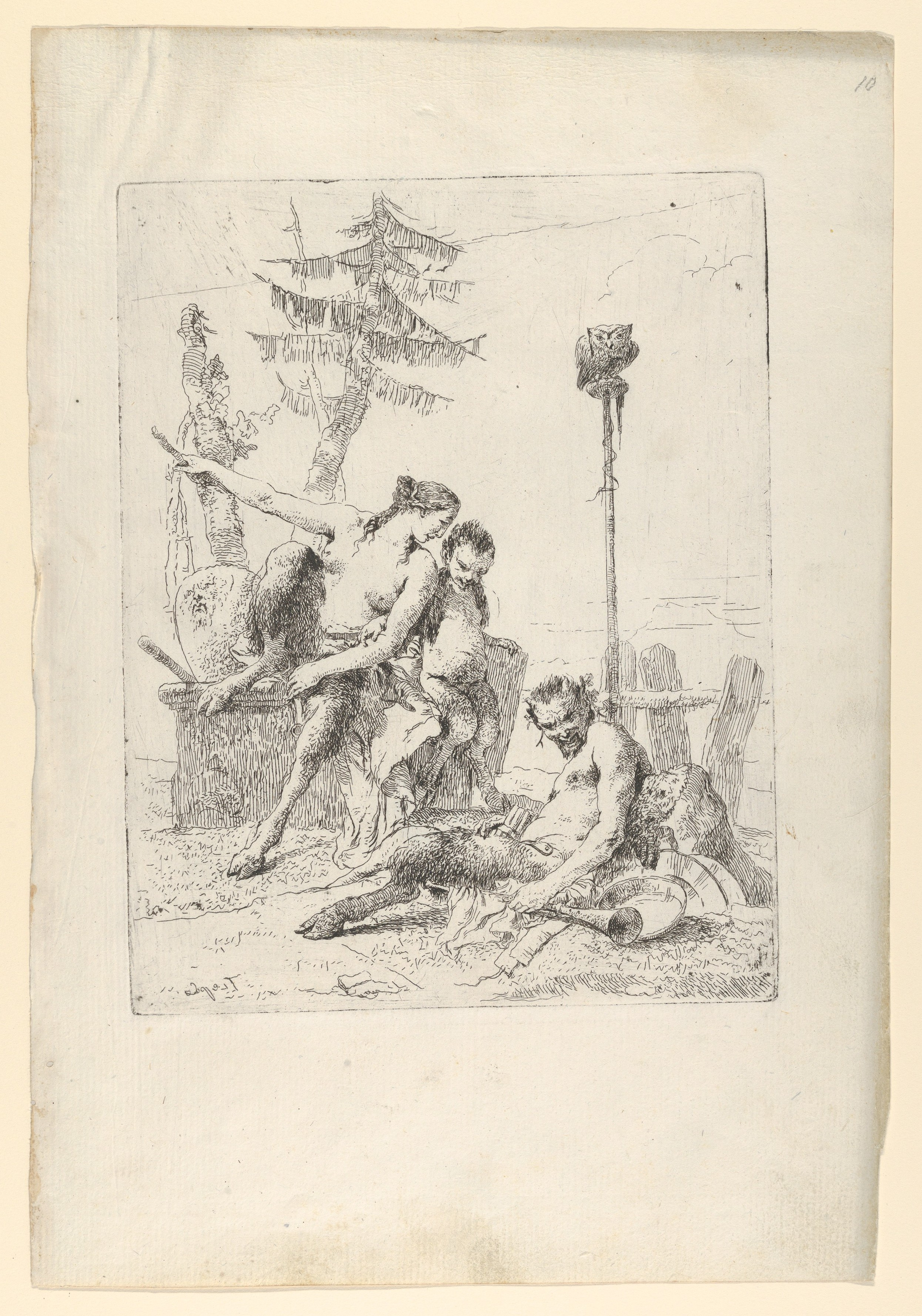
Satyr Family (Pan and his Family), etching, c. 1743–1750

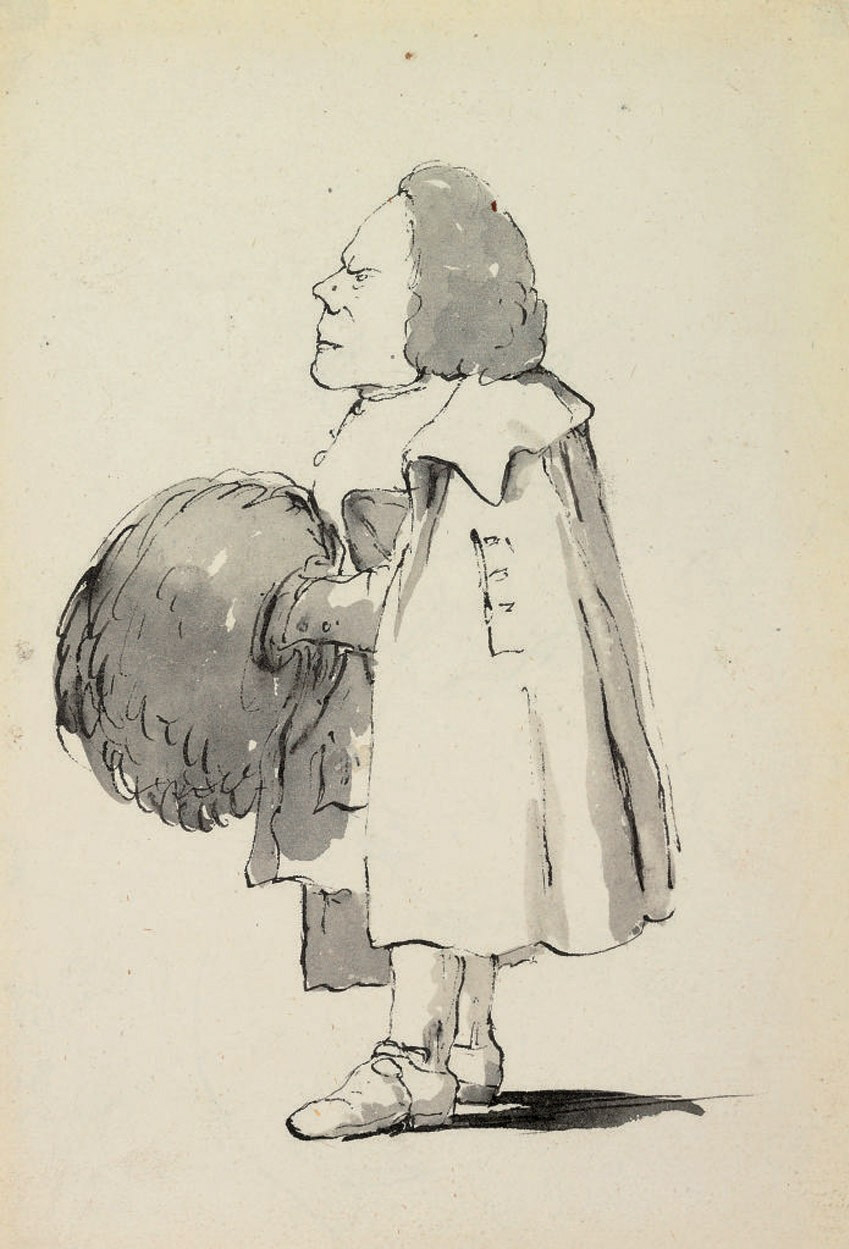
Caricature of a short gentleman holding a muff, pen and ink with gray wash

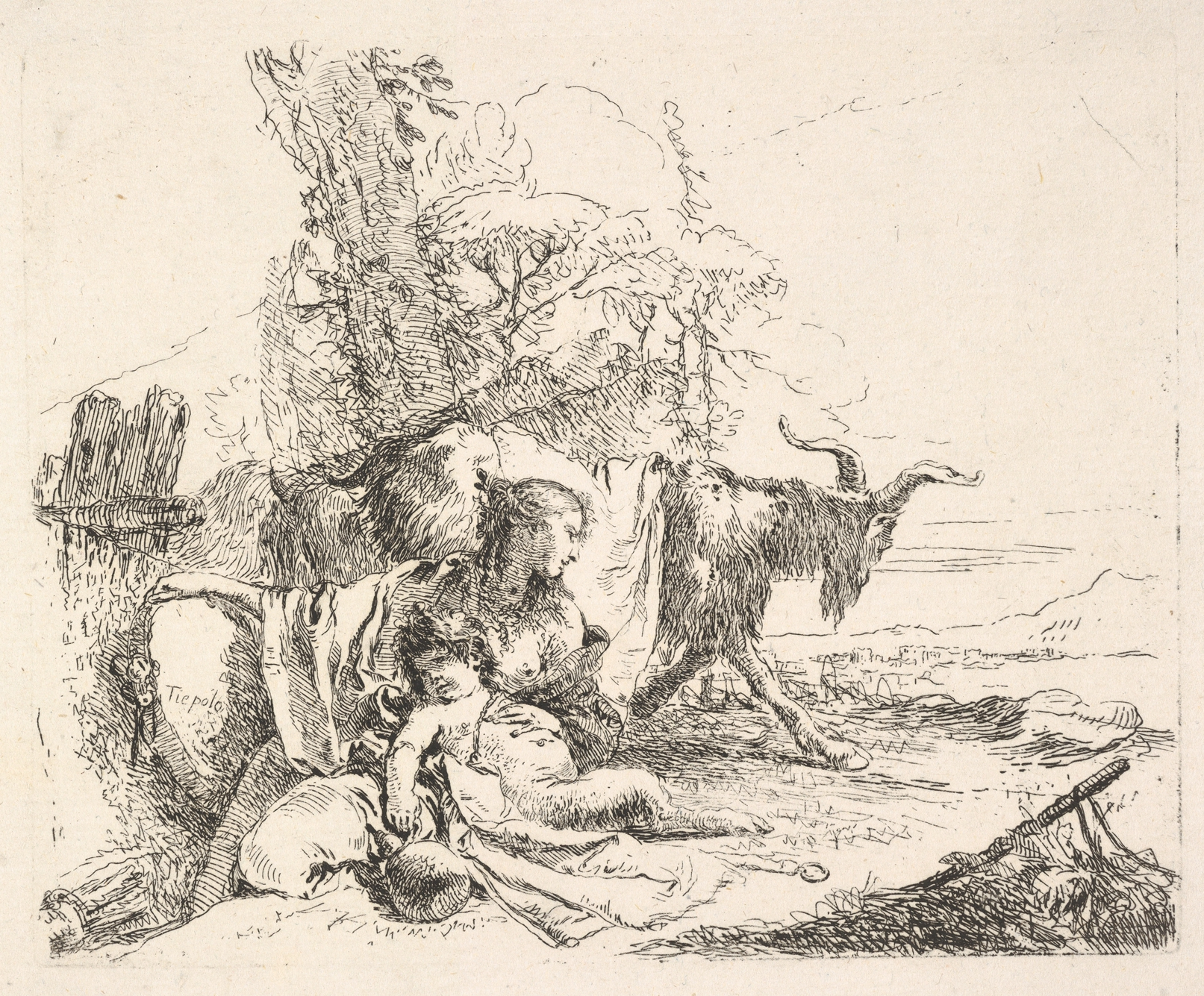
Woman and infant satyr in a landscape, from the etching series 'The Capricci'

== List of works ==
=== Paintings before 1740 ===
Work	Date	Location	Link
Scipio Africanus Freeing Massiva	between 1719 and 1721	The Walters Art Museum, Baltimore, USA	
The Martyrdom of St. Bartholomew	1722	San Stae, Venice	
The Glory of St. Dominic	1723	Gallerie dell'Accademia, Venice	
The Rape of Europa	c. 1725	Gallerie dell'Accademia, Venice	
Allegory of the Power of Eloquence	c. 1725	Courtauld Institute, Modello for Palazzo Sandi, Venice	
Frescoes	1726	Episcopal palace, Udine	
Ca' Dolfin Tiepolos	1726–1729	Metropolitan Museum of Art, New York; Hermitage Museum, St Petersburg; Kunsthistorisches Museum, Vienna	
Perseus & Andromeda	1730	Frick Collection	
Education of the Virgin	1732	Santa Maria della Consolazione (Fava), Venice	
Angel rescuing Hagar	1732	Scuola di San Rocco, Venice	
John the Baptist preaching	1732–1733	Cappella Colleoni, Bergamo	
Beheading of John the Baptist	1732–1733	Cappella Colleoni, Bergamo	
Scourge of the Serpents	1732–1735	Gallerie dell'Accademia, Venice	
Joseph receiving ring from pharaoh	1732–1735	Dulwich Picture Gallery	
Triumph of Zephyr and Flora	1734–1735	Museo del Settecento Veneziano, Ca' Rezzonico, Venice	
Jupiter and Danaë	1736	Universitet Konsthistoriska Institutionen, Stockholm	
The Finding of Moses	1736–1738	National Gallery of Scotland, Edinburgh	
Pope St. Clement Adoring the Trinity	1737–1738	Alte Pinakothek, Munich	
Saint Augustin, Saint Louis of France, Saint John the Evangelist and a bishop	1737–1738	Palais des Beaux-Arts de Lille	
Institution of the Rosary	1737–1739	Church of the Gesuati, Venice	
Christ Carrying the Cross	1737–1738	Sant'Alvise, Venice	
The Madonna of Mount Carmel	1730s	Pinacoteca di Brera, Milan	
Virgin with Six Saints	1737–1740	Museum of Fine Arts, Budapest	

=== Works from 1740–1750 ===
Work	Date	Location	Link
The Virgin with 3 female Dominican Saints	1739–1748	Church of the Gesuati, Venice	
Alexander the Great and Campaspe in the Studio of Apelles	1740	Getty Center, Los Angeles	
The Virgin Appearing to St. Philip Neri	1740	Museo Diocesano, Camerino	
The Gathering of Manna	1740–1742	Parrocchiale, Verolanuova	
The Sacrifice of Melchizedek	1740–1742	Parrocchial church, Verolanuova	
The Finding of Moses	1740–1745	National Gallery of Victoria, Melbourne	
Rinaldo Enchanted by Armida	1742	Art Institute of Chicago	
Rinaldo and Armida in Her Garden	1742	Art Institute of Chicago	
Armida Abandoned by Rinaldo	1742	Art Institute of Chicago	
Rinaldo and the Magus of Ascalon	1742	Art Institute of Chicago	
The Triumph of Virtue and Nobility over Ignorance	1743	Norton Simon Museum, (Pasadena, CA)	
Empire of Flora	1743	The Legion of Honor, (San Francisco, CA)	
Time Unveiling Truth	c. 1743	Museo Civico Palazzo Chiericati, Vicenza	
The Banquet of Cleopatra	1743–1744	National Gallery of Victoria, Melbourne	
Worshippers	1743–1745	Gallerie dell'Accademia, Venice	
Apollo and Daphne	1755–1760	National Gallery of Art, Washington DC	
Discovery of the True Cross	c. 1745	Gallerie dell'Accademia, Venice	
Time Unveiling Truth	c. 1745–1750	Museum of Fine Arts, Boston	
Frescoes of the story of Cleopatra	1746	Palazzo Labia, Venice	
Saint Patrick, Bishop of Ireland	1746	Musei Civici di Padova, Padua	
Last Communion of St. Lucy	1747–1748	Santi Apostoli, Venice	
The Banquet of Cleopatra and Antony	1747–1750	North Carolina Museum of Art, Raleigh, North Carolina, USA	
The Glorification of the Barbaro Family	1749–1750	Metropolitan Museum of Art, New York, USA	
St. James the Greater Conquering the Moors	1749–1750	Museum of Fine Arts, Budapest, Hungary	
Bacchus and Ariadne	1743–1745	National Gallery of Art, Washington, D.C., USA	

=== Works after 1750 ===
Work	Date	Location	Link
Frescoes	1751–1753	Residenz, Würzburg	
Collecting Manna	c. 1751	National Museum of Serbia, Belgrade	
Allegory of Planets and Continents	1752	Metropolitan Museum of Art, New York	
The Death of Hyacinth	1752–1753	Thyssen-Bornemisza Museum, Madrid	
Adoration of the Magi	1753	Alte Pinakothek, Munich	
Coronation of the Virgin	1754	Kimbell Art Museum, Dallas (modelo for Ospedale della Pietà)	
The Entrance of the Gonfaloniere Piero Soderini into Florence in 1502 (L'ingresso di gonfaloniere Piero Soderini in Firenze nel 1502)	1754	Swiss Embassy, Rome, Italy	
An Allegory with Venus and Time	1754–1758	National Gallery, London	
Frescoes from Roman mythology	1757	Villa Valmarana, Vicenza	
A Seated Man and a Girl with a Pitcher	c. 1755	National Gallery, London	
The Theological Virtues	c. 1755	Royal Museums of Fine Arts of Belgium, Brussels	
The Martyrdom of St. Agatha	c. 1756	Gemäldegalerie, Berlin,	
Allegory of Merit Accompanied by Nobility and Virtue	1757–1758	Museo del Settecento Veneziano, Ca' Rezzonico, Venice	
Santa Tecla prays for the Liberation of Este from the Plague	1759	Church of Santa Tecla, Este	
Pope St. Sylvester baptises emperor Constantine the Great	1759	Chiesa di San Silvestro, Brescia	
The Vision of St. Anne	1759	Gemäldegalerie Alte Meister, Dresden	
Virtue and Nobility Crowning Love	1759–1761	Museum of Fine Arts, Boston	
Modello for the Apotheosis of the Pisani Family	1760	Musée des Beaux-Arts d'Angers	
Madonna of the Goldfinch	c. 1760	National Gallery of Art, Washington	
Woman with a Parrot	1760–1761	Ashmolean Museum, Oxford	
Apotheosis of the Pisani Family	1761–1762	Villa Pisani, Stra	
San Carlo Borromeo	1767–1769	Cincinnati Art Museum	
The Immaculate Conception	1767–1769	Museo del Prado, Madrid	
Glory of Spain	1762–1766	Throne Room of Royal Palace of Madrid	
The Apotheosis of the Spanish Monarchy	1762–1766	Queen's Antechamber, Royal Palace of Madrid	
Venus and Vulcan	1762–1766	Halberdiers' Room, Royal Palace of Madrid	
The Entombment of Christ	1769–1770	National Museum of Ancient Art, Lisbon	
The Flight to Egypt	1765–1770	National Museum of Ancient Art, Lisbon	

== Legacy ==
In 1878, Mark Twain wrote in his diary: "Tiepolo is my artist."

Roberto Calasso's Tiepolo Pink (Italian: Il Rosa Tiepolo), which takes its name from an epithet Marcel Proust uses to describe several of his female characters, is an interpretation of Tiepolo's life as the last artist of the ancien régime, depicting his work as "the last breath of happiness in Europe." It contains detailed analysis of Tiepolo's mysterious Capricci and Scherzi.

== Sources ==
- Giambattista Tiepolo 1698–1770 (Exhibition catalogue). New York: Metropolitan Museum of Art. 1996. ISBN 9780870998119.
- Levey, Michael (1980). Painting in Eighteenth-Century Venice (revised ed.). Cornell University Press. pp. 225–230. ISBN 9780801413315.
- Wittkower, Rudolf (1993). Art and Architecture in Italy.
