= Saint Patrick, Bishop of Ireland =

Painting by Giambattista Tiepolo

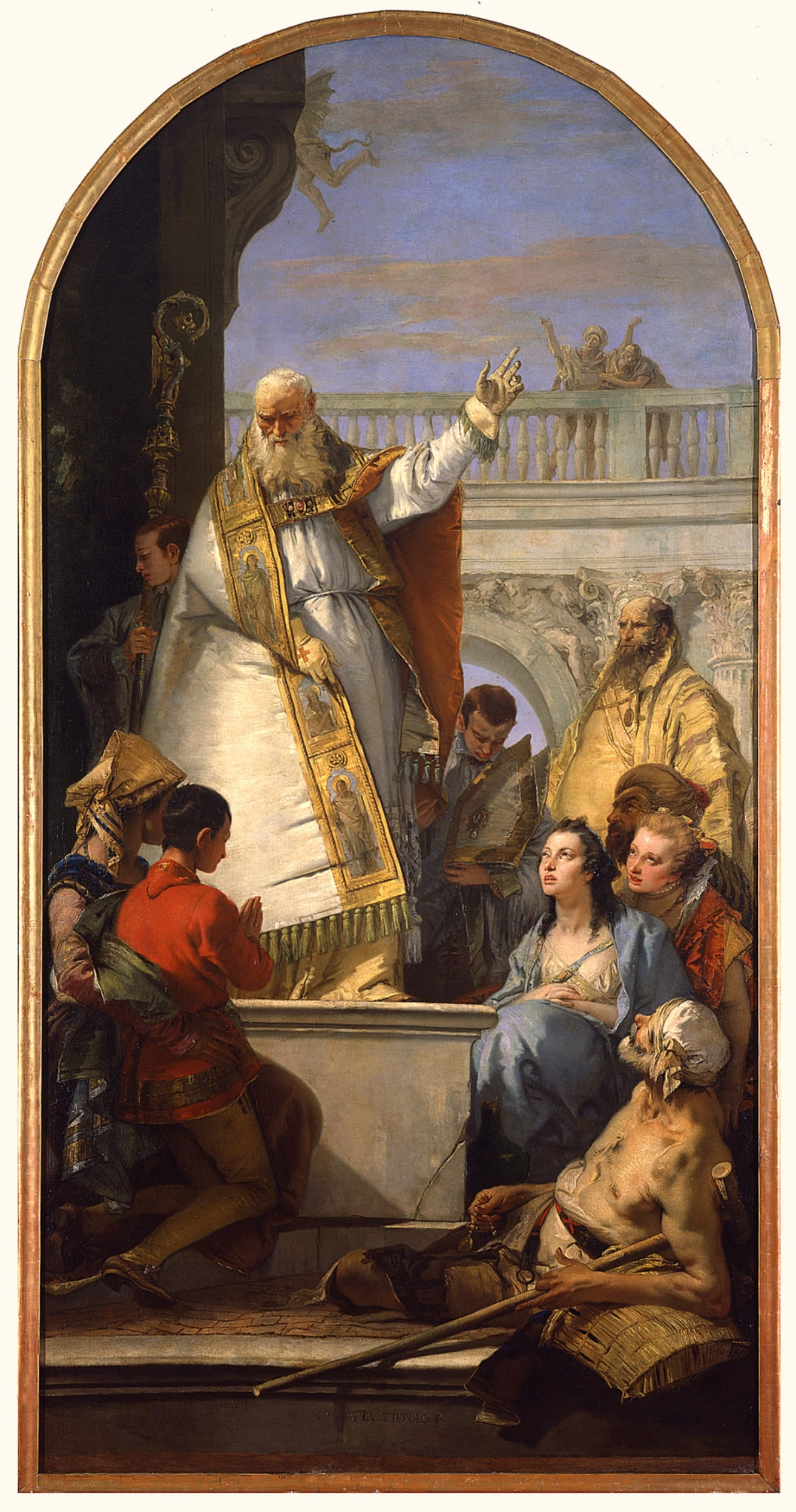
Saint Patrick, Bishop of Ireland (1746)

Saint Patrick, Bishop of Ireland is a 1746 painting by Giambattista Tiepolo, produced for the Canons Regular of the Lateran at the church of San Giovanni di Verdara, who venerated him as a member of their own order. It is now in the Musei civici di Padova.

It shows Saint Patrick in the vestments of a bishop, standing on a marble pedestal and raising his left hand as he cures an invalid. The artist had difficulty with the composition - a group of pen and ink drawings survive showing possible compositions of him healing a young man, preaching or exorcising a demon.
