= Lorenzo Baldissera Tiepolo =

Italian painter

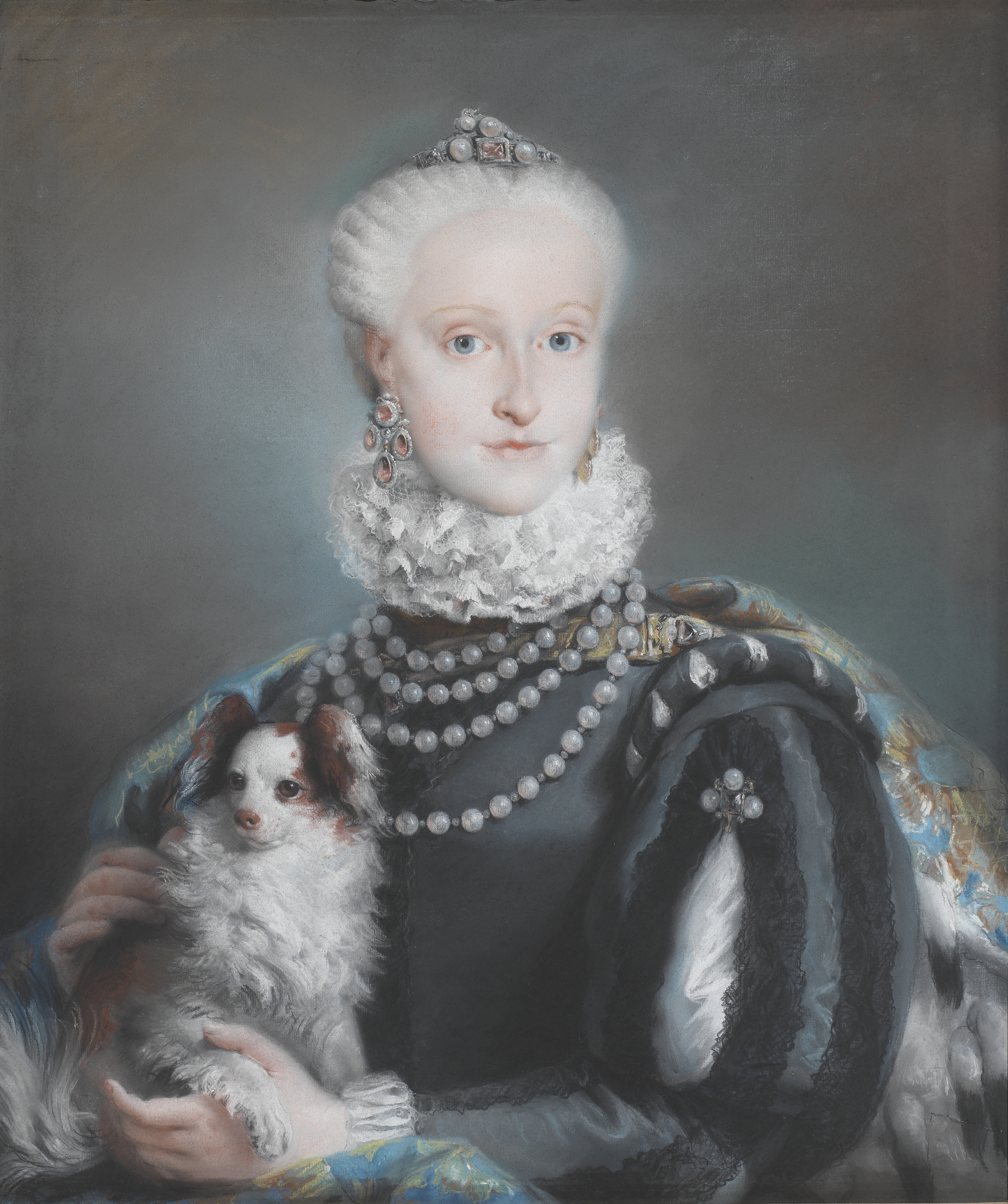
Infanta Maria Josefa Carmela by Lorenzo Baldissera Tiepolo

Lorenzo Baldissera Tiepolo (8 August 1736 – August 1776) was an artist and son of the more famous Giovanni Battista Tiepolo. In 1750, he travelled to Würzburg with his father and brother, Giovanni Domenico Tiepolo, where he worked alongside them on the decorative fresco cycle in the Würzburg Residence. A number of drawings have been attributed to him from these apprentice years.
