= The Banquet of Cleopatra (Tiepolo) =

Painting by Giovanni Battista (Tiepolo)

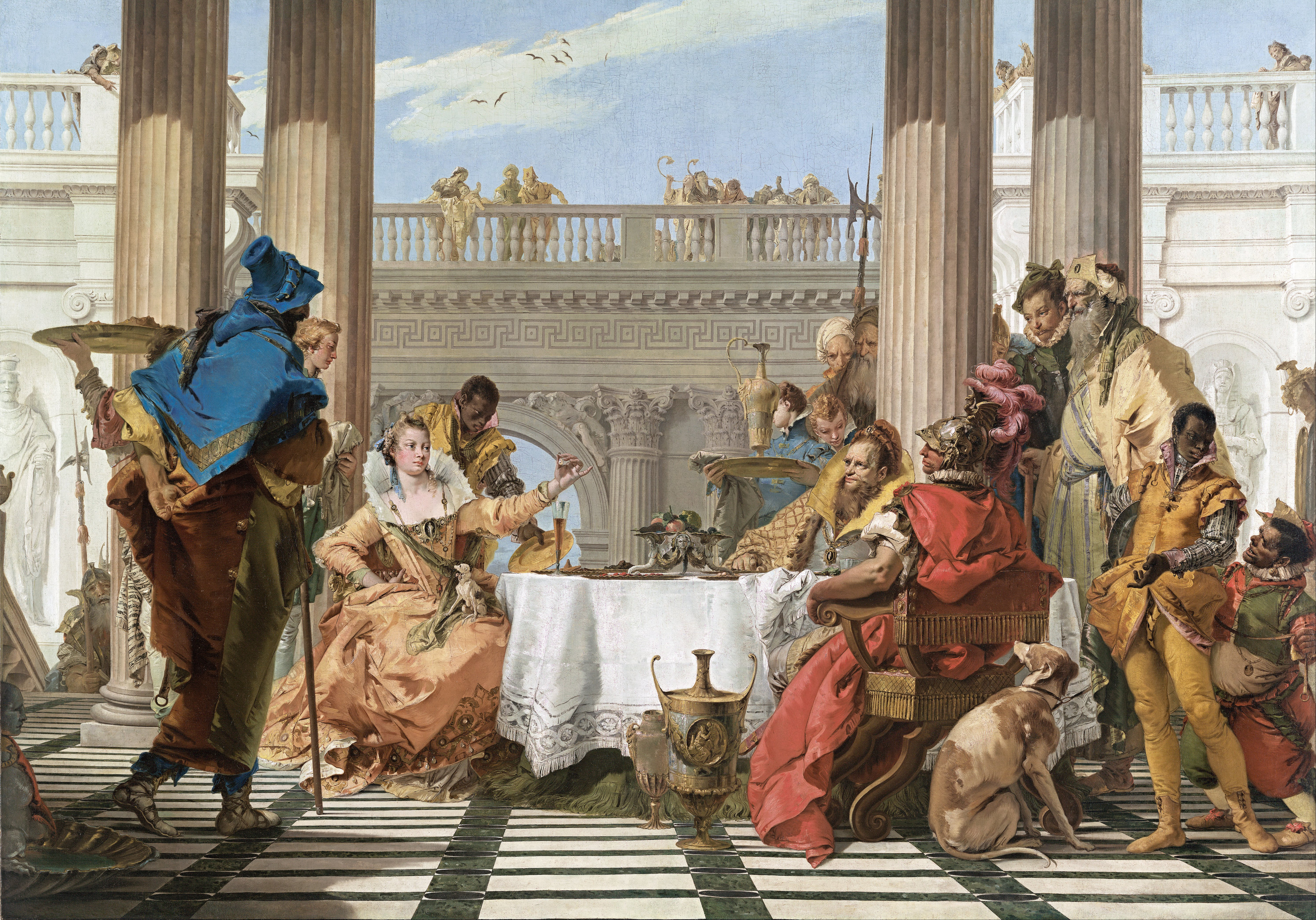
- Artist: Giovanni Battista Tiepolo
- Year: 1744
- Type: Oil paint on canvas
- Dimensions: 250.3 by 357 centimetres (98.5 in × 140.6 in)
- Location: National Gallery of Victoria, Melbourne

The Banquet of Cleopatra is a painting by Giovanni Battista Tiepolo completed in 1744. It is now in the National Gallery of Victoria in Melbourne, Australia.

The subject of the painting is a supposed historical banquet, hosted by Cleopatra for Marc Antony, and described by both Pliny's Natural History (9.58.119–121) and Plutarch's Lives (Antony 25.36.1). During this banquet Cleopatra takes an expensive pearl and dissolves it in her wine, prior to imbibing the drink.

This is the first of three large paintings of the subject by Tiepolo. In addition to these, the much smaller oil studies or modelli for each of the larger paintings survive.

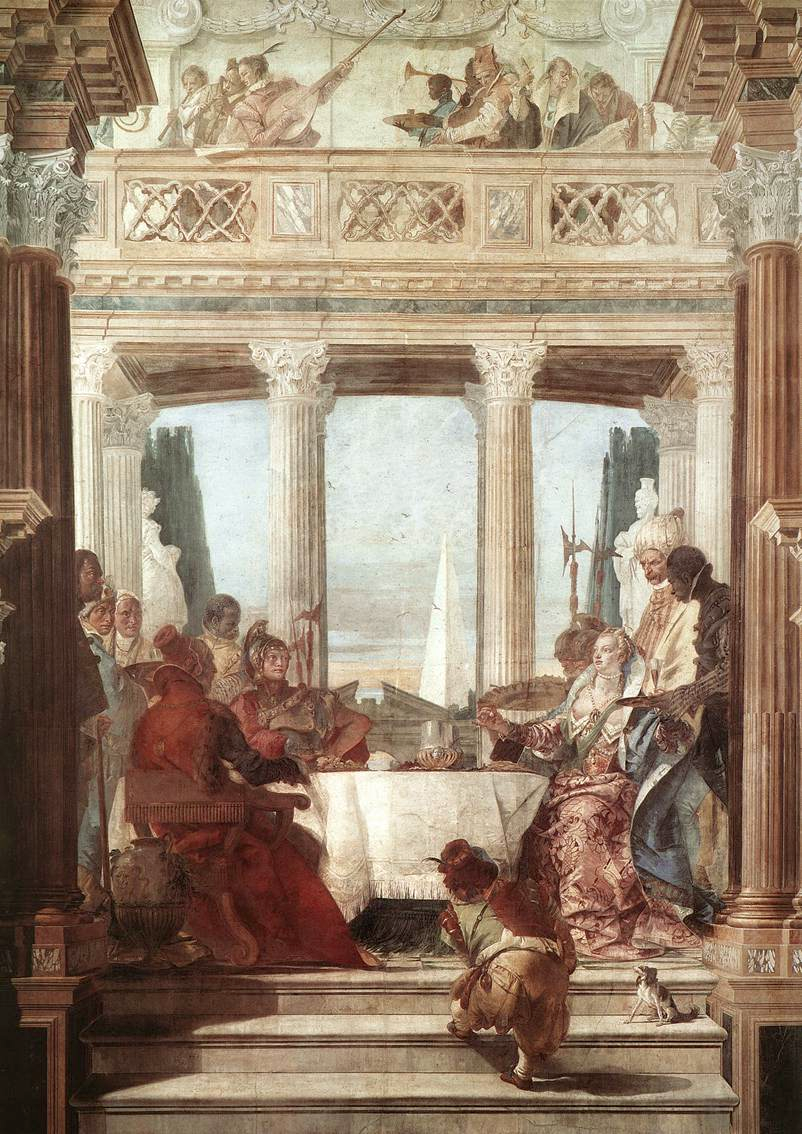
Tiepolo's fresco version for the ballroom of the Palazzo Labia, Venice (slightly trimmed)

Tiepolo returned to the subject a few years later at the Palazzo Labia in Venice with his frescoes on the theme of Mark Antony and Cleopatra: the Banquet was paired with a Meeting of Cleopatra and Mark Antony and surrounding scenes of gods and attendants. Two further large canvases by Tiepolo of these scenes are in the Arkhangelskoye Palace near Moscow (1747; 338 × 600 cm).

Tiepolo typically made oil sketch modelli with varying degrees of finish to show his composition and, perhaps, submit it for approval to the client. The modello for the Melbourne painting is in the Musée Cognacq-Jay in Paris, and was owned by Count Francesco Algarotti until his death. There is a small (46.3 by 66.7 centimetres (18.2 in × 26.3 in)) oil sketch by Tiepolo in the National Gallery, London, which may relate to the painting in the Palazzo Labia, although it differs considerably from that work; it is more usually regarded as a study for the Archangelskoye painting. There is another small work in oils in the collection of Stockholm University in Sweden, a modello for the Palazzo Labia composition, and there are a number of preparatory drawings in various collections.

== Composition ==
All three large paintings show the banquet taking place in the open air or in a loggia with a grand architectural setting but with the sky visible, and include a raised terrace closing off the back of the pictorial space. In the Palazzo Labia and Arkhangelskoye paintings (and the Paris and London modelli) there are steps in the foreground leading up to the dining table; although the Melbourne painting lacks these steps, the pattern of the marble floor gives a similar visual effect. Only the two or three main figures are seated, but various attendants stand around them. All the compositions show a clear debt to Paolo Veronese's grandly theatrical feast paintings of nearly a century earlier, such as The Wedding at Cana (1563, Louvre) and The Feast in the House of Levi (1573, Accademia, Venice). Venetian taste approved of such explicit reference to the city's artistic tradition. In the Palazzo Labia the frescoes were designed in conjunction with a scheme of trompe-l'œil architecture by Gerolamo Mengozzi Colonna embracing the whole space. The frescoes come almost down to the floor, so that the steps bring the main scene up to a height where they could be seen across a crowded room.

The episode depicts the spartan Roman warrior represented by Antony being seduced by the sensual opulence of the East, as exemplified by Cleopatra. The wealth of the scene is compounded by the presence of black servants, often held as slaves in Venice. With respect to the Labia frescoes, it is not clear if this family, newly inducted into the patriciate, would have been attempting through this fresco, not only to display their ability to employ one of the best local artists, but also to remind visitors of the Labia's wealth, and specifically the palazzo's owner, Maria Labia's jewelry collection. It is also not clear whether the fresco is a distant allegory of the movement eastward of the Labia family, originally from Spain, to this mainly Levantine republic.

== Provenance ==
The Melbourne painting was commissioned for Frederick Augustus III, Elector of Saxony, by his agent Francesco Algarotti. According to a letter of 1744 from Algarotti to Heinrich von Brühl (1700–1763), the Saxon chief minister, he saw it unfinished in Tiepolo's studio, where it had been commissioned by someone else, and persuaded Tiepolo to finish it for Dresden. It has been speculated that the original commissioner was the English "Consul Smith".

It was acquired in 1764 by Catherine the Great in Amsterdam. The work remained in the collection of the Hermitage Museum in what was then Saint Petersburg and later became Leningrad. It was part of the Soviet sale of Hermitage paintings, and was purchased by an English art dealer in 1932. It was purchased by the National Gallery of Victoria in 1933 for A£25,000; an account of the transaction by the agent for the National Gallery of Victoria describes how "...he carried payment made at the request of the vendor in bundles of small currency across Trafalgar Square in a suitcase.”

== Notes ==
- Anderson, Jaynie, Tiepolo's Cleopatra, 2003, Macmillan Education Australia, ISBN 1876832444, 9781876832445,google preview
- Christiansen, Keith, Giambattista Tiepolo, 1696–1770: Catalog of an Exhibition Held at the Museo Del Settecento Veneziano, Ca' Rezzonico, Venice, from Sept. 5 – Dec. 9, 1996 and at the Metropolitan Museum of Art, New York, from Jan. 22 – Apr. 27, 1997, 1996, Metropolitan Museum of Art, ISBN 0870998129, 9780870998126, Paris modello is #19 with the entry for it by William L. Barchem, google preview
- Martineau, Jane, and Robison, Andrew, The Glory of Venice: Art in the Eighteenth Century, 1994, Yale University Press/Royal Academy of Arts, ISBN 0300061862 (Catalogue for exhibition in London and Washington)
