= Provincial elections in Lombardy =

This page gathers the results of provincial elections in Lombardy since 2004. Elections were suspended in 2012.

== Results by year ==
=== 2004 provincial elections ===
	House of Freedoms			The Olive Tree			Lega Nord			Others
	candidate	1st round	2nd round	candidate	1st round	2nd round	candidate	1st round	2nd round	1st round
Bergamo	Valerio Bettoni (Forza Italia)	35.2%	52.8%	Giuseppe Facchetti (Democracy is Freedom)	30.3%	35.2%	Giacomo Stucchi (Lega Lombarda–Lega Nord)	21.9%	-	11.0%
Brescia	Alberto Cavalli (Forza Italia)	38.6%	54.0%	Ernesto Bino (Democrats of the Left)	36.2%	46.0%	Alessandro Cè (Lega Lombarda–Lega Nord)	13.1%	with CdL	12.1%
Cremona	Giovanni Rossoni (Forza Italia)	35.6%	44.0%	Giuseppe Torchio (Democracy is Freedom)	46.2%	56.0%	Cesare Giovinetti (Lega Lombarda–Lega Nord)	12.4%	with CdL	5.8%
Lecco	Dario Luigi Perego (Forza Italia)	31.5%	43.5%	Virginio Brivio (Democracy is Freedom)	47.3%	56.5%	Ugo Parolo (Lega Lombarda–Lega Nord)	20.7%	with CdL	0.5%
Lodi	Angelo Mazzola (Forza Italia)	35.7%	45.1%	Lino Felissari (Democrats of the Left)	44.8%	54.9%	Mauro Rossi (Lega Lombarda–Lega Nord)	13.4%	with CdL	6.1%
Milan	Ombretta Colli (Forza Italia)	38.3%	46.0%	Filippo Penati (Democrats of the Left)	43.2%	54.0%	Massimo Zanello (Lega Lombarda–Lega Nord)	8.6%	with CdL	9.9%
Sondrio	Eugenio Tarabini (Forza Italia)	32.2%	29.9%	Giacomo Tognini (Democracy is Freedom)	26.8%	-	Fiorello Provera (Lega Lombarda–Lega Nord)	28.3%	70.1%	12.7%

Source: La Repubblica

=== 2006 provincial elections ===
	House of Freedoms (incl. Lega Nord)			The Union			Others
	candidate	1st round	2nd round	candidate	1st round	2nd round	1st round
Mantua	Giovanni Rossi (Forza Italia)	45.0%	-	Maurizio Fontanili (Democracy is Freedom)	53.5%	-	1.5%
Pavia	Vittorio Poma (Forza Italia)	50.3%	-	Andrea Albergati (Democracy is Freedom)	46.4%	-	3.2%

Source: La Repubblica

=== 2007 provincial elections ===
	House of Freedoms (incl. Lega Nord)			The Union			Others
	candidate	1st round	2nd round	candidate	1st round	2nd round	1st round
Como	Leonardo Carioni (Lega Lombarda–Lega Nord)	67.8%	-	Mauro Guerra (Democrats of the Left)	28.6%	-	3.7%
Varese	Marco Reguzzoni (Lega Lombarda–Lega Nord)	67.1%	-	Mario Aspesi (Democracy is Freedom)	25.3%	-	7.7%

Source: La Repubblica

=== 2008 provincial elections ===
	The People of Freedom–Lega Nord			Democratic Party and allies			Others
	candidate	1st round	2nd round	candidate	1st round	2nd round	1st round
Varese	Dario Galli (Lega Lombarda–Lega Nord)	64.1%	-	Mario Aspesi (Democratic Party)	26.1%	-	13.0%

Source: La Repubblica

=== 2009 provincial elections ===
	The People of Freedom–Lega Nord			Democratic Party and allies			Union of the Centre			Others
	candidate	1st round	2nd round	candidate	1st round	2nd round	candidate	1st round	2nd round	1st round
Bergamo	Ettore Pirovano (Lega Lombarda–Lega Nord)	59.0%	-	Francesco Cornolti (Democratic Party)	20.3%	-	Luigi Pisoni (Union of the Centre)	13.6%	-	7.1%
Brescia	Daniele Molgora (Lega Lombarda–Lega Nord)	55.5%	-	Diego Peli (Democratic Party)	22.5%	-	Gianmarco Quadrini (Union of the Centre)	7.6%	-	14.4%
Cremona	Massimiliano Salini (The People of Freedom)	51.1%	-	Giuseppe Torchio (Democratic Party)	35.9%	-	Giuseppe Trespidi (Union of the Centre)	4.1%	-	9.0%
Lecco	Daniele Nava (The People of Freedom)	54.3%	-	Virginio Brivio (Democratic Party)	38.0%	-	Marco Carboni (Union of the Centre)	3.4%	-	4.2%
Lodi	Pietro Foroni (Lega Lombarda–Lega Nord)	54.2%	-	Lino Felissari (Democratic Party)	38.2%	-	Giacomo Arcaini (Union of the Centre)	4.0%	-	3.6%
Milan	Guido Podestà (The People of Freedom)	48.8%	50.2%	Filippo Penati (Democratic Party)	38.8%	49.8%	Enrico Marcora (Union of the Centre)	3.7%	-	8.6%
Monza	Dario Allevi (The People of Freedom)	54.1%	-	Pietro Luigi Ponti (Democratic Party)	33.5%	-	Domenico Pisani (Union of the Centre)	4.5%	-	7.9%
Sondrio	Massimo Sertori (Lega Lombarda–Lega Nord)	61.1%	-	Giacomo Ciapponi (Democratic Party)	31.8%	-	Michele Aili (Union of the Centre)	4.9%	-	2.2%

Source: La Repubblica

=== 2011 provincial elections ===
	The People of Freedom–Lega Nord			Democratic Party and allies			Union of the Centre			Others
	candidate	1st round	2nd round	candidate	1st round	2nd round	candidate	1st round	2nd round	1st round
Mantua	Gianni Fava (Lega Lombarda–Lega Nord)	41.1%	42.7%	Alessandro Pastacci (Democratic Party)	41.8%	57.3%	Pietro Marcazzan (Union of the Centre)	5.1%	-	12.0%
Pavia	Ruggero Invernizzi (The People of Freedom)	44.1%	48.8%	Daniele Bosone (Democratic Party)	33.8%	51.2%	Vittorio Poma (Union of the Centre)	9.6%	-	12.5%

Source: Ministry of the Interior
