= 1976 Italian Senate election in Lombardy =

- June 20, 1976

All 48 Lombard seats to the Italian Senate
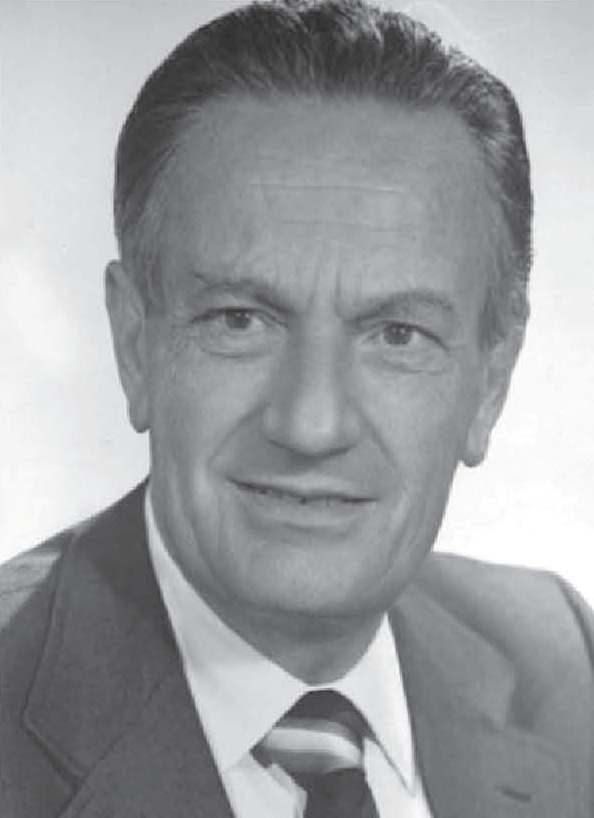

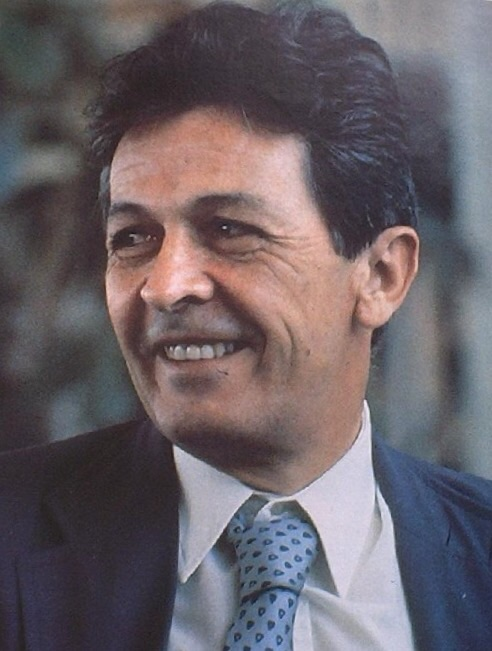

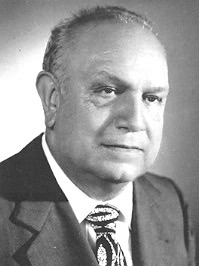
	Majority party	Minority party	Third party
Leader	Benigno Zaccagnini	Enrico Berlinguer	Francesco De Martino
Party	DC	PCI	PSI
Last election	41.7%, 20 seats	24.5%, 12 seats	13.0%, 6 seats
Seats won	21	16	6
Seat change	▲1	▲4	=
Popular vote	2,170,893	1,598,097	613,253
Percentage	41.8%	30.7%	11.8%
Swing	▲0.1%	▲6.2%	▼1.2%
Old local plurality before election
DC
New local plurality
DC

Lombardy elected its seventh delegation to the Italian Senate on June 20, 1976. This election was a part of national Italian general election of 1976 even if, according to the Italian Constitution, every senatorial challenge in each Region is a single and independent race.

Lombardy obtained three more seats to the Senate, following the redistricting subsequent to the 1971 Census.

The election was won by the centrist Christian Democracy, as it happened at national level. Seven Lombard provinces gave a majority or at least a plurality to the winning party, while the agricultural Province of Pavia and Province of Mantua preferred the Italian Communist Party.

== Background ==
The Italian Communist Party, which had annexed the Italian Socialist Party of Proletarian Unity, strengthened under Enrico Berlinguer's leadership, reducing the gap with the Christian Democracy, which by its part obtained some votes from minor forces, as the Italian Liberal Party and the Italian Democratic Socialist Party, to face the red rising.

== Electoral system ==
The electoral system for the Senate was a strange hybrid which established a form of proportional representation into FPTP-like constituencies. A candidate needed a landslide victory of more than 65% of votes to obtain a direct mandate. All constituencies where this result was not reached entered into an at-large calculation based upon the D'Hondt method to distribute the seats between the parties, and candidates with the best percentages of suffrages inside their party list were elected.

== Results ==
Party	votes	votes (%)	seats	swing
Christian Democracy	2,170,893	41.8	21	▲1
Italian Communist Party	1,598,097	30.7	16	▲4
Italian Socialist Party	613,253	11.8	6	=
Italian Social Movement	210,741	4.1	2	=
Italian Republican Party	185,899	3.6	1	=
Italian Democratic Socialist Party	183,383	3.5	1	▼1
Italian Liberal Party	109,028	2.1	1	▼1
Others	136,997	2.4	-	=
Total parties	5,198,291	100.0	48	▲3

Sources: Italian Ministry of the Interior

=== Constituencies ===
N°	Constituency	Elected	Party	Votes %	Others
1	Bergamo	Angelo Castelli	Christian Democracy	59.1%	
2	Clusone	Leandro Rampa	Christian Democracy	63.8%	
3	Treviglio	Vincenzo Bombardieri	Christian Democracy	57.3%	
4	Brescia	Mino Martinazzoli	Christian Democracy	45.6%	
5	Breno	Giacomo Mazzoli	Christian Democracy	55.3%	
6	Chiari	Mario Pedini	Christian Democracy	57.3%	
7	Salò	Fabiano De Zan; Egidio Ariosto	Christian Democracy; Italian Democratic Socialist Party	48.3% 5.8%	
8	Como	Luigi Borghi	Christian Democracy	44.8%	
9	Lecco	Tommaso Morlino	Christian Democracy	52.3%	
10	Cantù	Siro Lombardini	Christian Democracy	49.6%	
11	Cremona	Vincenzo Vernaschi; Giuseppe Garoli	Christian Democracy; Italian Communist Party	39.6% 36.5%	
12	Crema	Ferdinando Truzzi; Giacomo Carnesella	Christian Democracy; Italian Socialist Party	49.0% 13.1%	Paolo Zanini (PCI) 28.4%
13	Mantua	Carlo Grazioli; Tullia Romagnoli	Christian Democracy; Italian Communist Party (Gsi)	37.0% 35.8%	
14	Ostiglia	Agostino Zavattini; Renato Colombo	Italian Communist Party; Italian Socialist Party	42.6% 14.8%	
15	Milan 1	Luigi Noè; Enzo Bettiza	Christian Democracy; Italian Liberal Party	37.1% 9.3%	
16	Milan 2	Gastone Nencioni	Italian Social Movement	9.0%	
17	Milan 3	Vera Squarcialupi; Giorgio Pisanò	Italian Communist Party; Italian Social Movement	28.9% 7.4%	
18	Milan 4	Urbano Aletti; Giovanni Spadolini	Christian Democracy; Italian Republican Party	36.5% 9.3%	
19	Milan 5	Mario Venanzi	Italian Communist Party	34.5%	
20	Milan 6	Lelio Basso; Carlo Polli	Italian Communist Party (Gsi); Italian Socialist Party	36.9% 13.8%	
21	Abbiategrasso	Ada Valeria Ruhl; Agostino Viviani	Italian Communist Party; Italian Socialist Party	38.0% 13.0%	
22	Rho	Giorgio Milani; Bruno Luzzati	Italian Communist Party; Italian Socialist Party	39.6% 13.1%	
23	Monza	Vittorino Colombo; Generoso Petrella	Christian Democracy; Italian Communist Party	41.0% 32.7%	
24	Vimercate	Giovanni Marcora; Angelo Romanò	Christian Democracy; Italian Communist Party (Gsi)	43.6% 33.6%	
25	Lodi	Camillo Ripamonti; Rodolfo Bollini	Christian Democracy; Italian Communist Party	39.6% 39.3%	
26	Pavia	Renato Cebrelli	Italian Communist Party	39.5%	
27	Voghera	Giovanni Bellinzona	Italian Communist Party	36.1%	
28	Vigevano	Armando Cossutta	Italian Communist Party	45.3%	
29	Sondrio	Eugenio Tarabini; Edoardo Catellani	Christian Democracy; Italian Socialist Party	52.1% 15.5%	
30	Varese	Aristide Marchetti; Claudio Donelli	Christian Democracy; Italian Communist Party	40.8% 29.9%	
31	Busto Arsizio	Gian Pietro Rossi; Modesto Merzario	Christian Democracy; Italian Communist Party	44.1% 29.6%	

- No senator obtained a direct mandate. The electoral system was, in the other cases, a form of proportional representation and not a FPTP race: so candidates winning with a simple plurality could have (and usually had) a candidate (usually a Christian democrat) with more votes in their constituency.

=== Substitutions ===
- Paolo Zanini for Crema (28.4%) replaced Lelio Basso in 1978. Reason: death.
