= 1979 Italian Senate election in Lombardy =

- June 3, 1979

All 48 Lombard seats to the Italian Senate
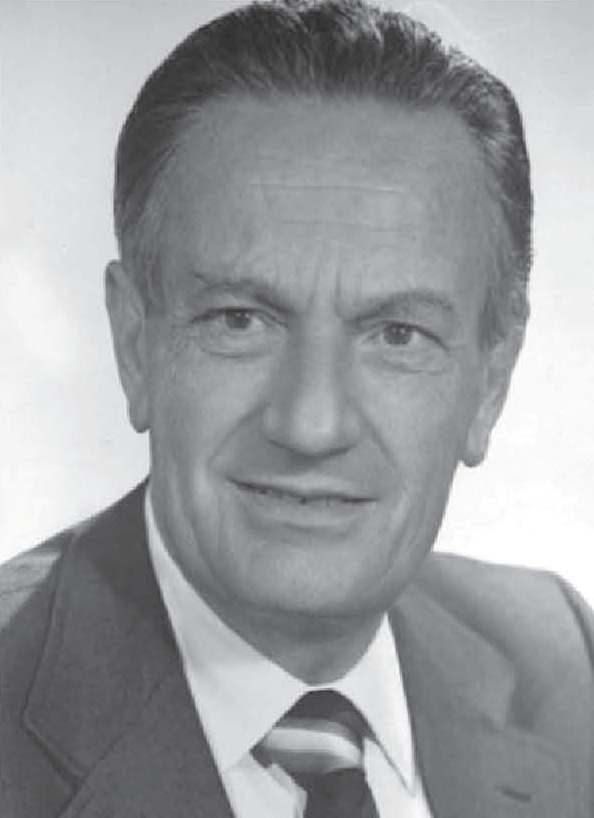

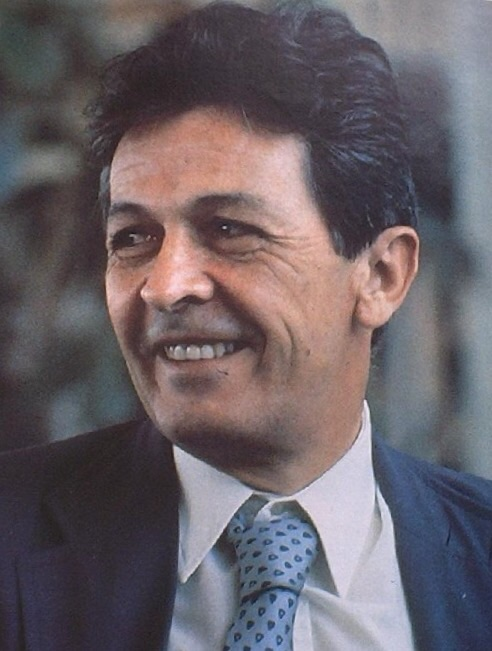
	Majority party	Minority party	Third party
Leader	Benigno Zaccagnini	Enrico Berlinguer	Bettino Craxi
Party	DC	PCI	PSI
Last election	41.8%, 21 seats	30.7%, 16 seats	11.8%, 6 seats
Seats won	21	15	6
Seat change	=	▼1	=
Popular vote	2,117,789	1,530,781	620,900
Percentage	40.7%	29.4%	11.9%
Swing	▼1.1%	▼1.3%	▲0.1%
Old local plurality before election
DC
New local plurality
DC

Lombardy elected its eighth delegation to the Italian Senate on June 3, 1979. This election was a part of national Italian general election of 1979 even if, according to the Italian Constitution, every senatorial challenge in each Region is a single and independent race.

The election was won by the centrist Christian Democracy, as it happened at national level. Seven Lombard provinces gave a majority or at least a plurality to the winning party, while the agricultural Province of Pavia and Province of Mantua preferred the Italian Communist Party.

== Background ==
For the first time the Italian Communist Party lost votes, after a period of terroristic attacks by the Red Brigades. Even the far-right Italian Social Movement was weakened. Between other minor parties, the Radical Party obtained its first seat.

== Electoral system ==
The electoral system for the Senate was a strange hybrid which established a form of proportional representation into FPTP-like constituencies. A candidate needed a landslide victory of more than 65% of votes to obtain a direct mandate. All constituencies where this result was not reached entered into an at-large calculation based upon the D'Hondt method to distribute the seats between the parties, and candidates with the best percentages of suffrages inside their party list were elected.

== Results ==
Party	votes	votes (%)	seats	swing
Christian Democracy	2,117,789	40.7	21	=
Italian Communist Party	1,530,781	29.4	15	▼1
Italian Socialist Party	620,900	11.9	6	=
Italian Democratic Socialist Party	217,704	4.2	2	▲1
Italian Social Movement	186,412	3.6	1	▼1
Italian Republican Party	162,090	3.1	1	=
Italian Liberal Party	156,745	3.0	1	=
Radical Party	154,257	3.0	1	▲1
Others	63,291	1.2	-	=
Total parties	5,209,969	100.0	48	=

Sources: Italian Ministry of the Interior

=== Constituencies ===
N°	Constituency	Elected	Party	Votes %	Others
1	Bergamo	Angelo Castelli	Christian Democracy	54.8%	
2	Clusone	Enzo Berlanda	Christian Democracy	62.1%	
3	Treviglio	Vincenzo Bombardieri	Christian Democracy	55.7%	
4	Brescia	Mino Martinazzoli; Gino Torri	Christian Democracy; Italian Communist Party	44.9% 28.3%	
5	Breno	Giacomo Mazzoli	Christian Democracy	54.2%	
6	Chiari	Mario Pedini	Christian Democracy	56.6%	
7	Salò	Fabiano De Zan; Egidio Ariosto	Christian Democracy; Italian Democratic Socialist Party	48.0% 6.5%	
8	Como	Luciano Forni; Gianfranco Conti Persini	Christian Democracy; Italian Democratic Socialist Party	42.0% 8.9%	
9	Lecco	Tommaso Morlino	Christian Democracy	49.6%	
10	Cantù	Luigi Granelli	Christian Democracy	47.5%	
11	Cremona	Vincenzo Vernaschi; Renzo Antoniazzi	Christian Democracy; Italian Communist Party	39.6% 36.6%	
12	Crema	Ferdinando Truzzi; Maurizio Noci	Christian Democracy; Italian Socialist Party	48.4% 13.2%	
13	Mantua	Carlo Grazioli; Giuseppe Chiarante; Gino Scevarolli	Christian Democracy; Italian Communist Party; Italian Socialist Party	36.7% 35.0% 13.4%	
14	Ostiglia	Agostino Zavattini; Enrico Novellini	Italian Communist Party; Italian Socialist Party	42.7% 14.9%	
15	Milan 1	Libero Mazza; Giovanni Malagodi	Christian Democracy; Italian Liberal Party	37.2% 9.7%	
16	Milan 2	Giorgio Pisanò; Gianfranco Spadaccia	Italian Social Movement; Radical Party	7.3% 6.0%	
17	Milan 3	None elected'			
18	Milan 4	Giovanni Spadolini	Italian Republican Party	7.9%	
19	Milan 5	Mario Venanzi	Italian Communist Party	32.1%	
20	Milan 6	Marina Rossanda; Rino Formica	Italian Communist Party; Italian Socialist Party	33.7% 13.8%	
21	Abbiategrasso	Ada Valeria Ruhl	Italian Communist Party	35.7%	Ambrogio Colombo (DC) 36.3%
22	Rho	Giorgio Milani	Italian Communist Party	37.7%	Vincenzo La Russa (DC) 34.6%
23	Monza	Vittorino Colombo; Libero Riccardelli	Christian Democracy; Italian Communist Party (Gsi)	39.9% 30.9%	
24	Vimercate	Giovanni Marcora; Angelo Romanò	Christian Democracy; Italian Communist Party (Gsi)	42.2% 31.8%	
25	Lodi	Camillo Ripamonti; Rodolfo Bollini	Christian Democracy; Italian Communist Party	38.9% 38.1%	
26	Pavia	Armelino Milani	Italian Communist Party	37.7%	Angelo Cordara (DC) 34.1%
27	Voghera	Carlo Lavezzari; Giovanni Bellinzona	Christian Democracy; Italian Communist Party	37.4% 34.0%	
28	Vigevano	Armando Cossutta	Italian Communist Party	43.2%	
29	Sondrio	Eugenio Tarabini; Libero Della Briotta	Christian Democracy; Italian Socialist Party	51.5% 17.3%	
30	Varese	Aristide Marchetti; Modesto Merzario; Attilio Spozio	Christian Democracy; Italian Communist Party; Italian Socialist Party	39.0% 28.1% 13.7%	
31	Busto Arsizio	Gian Pietro Rossi	Christian Democracy	42.4%	

- No senator obtained a direct mandate. The electoral system was, in the other cases, a form of proportional representation and not a FPTP race: so candidates winning with a simple plurality could have (and usually had) a candidate (usually a Christian democrat) with more votes in their constituency.

=== Substitutions ===
- Ambrogio Colombo for Abbiategrasso (36.3%) replaced Mario Pedini in 1980. Reason: resignation.
- Vincenzo La Russa for Rho (34.6%) replaced Ferdinando Truzzi in 1981. Reason: resignation.
- Angelo Cordara for Pavia (34.1%) replaced Giovanni Marcora in 1983. Reason: death.
