= Chorionic villi =

Villi that sprout from the chorion

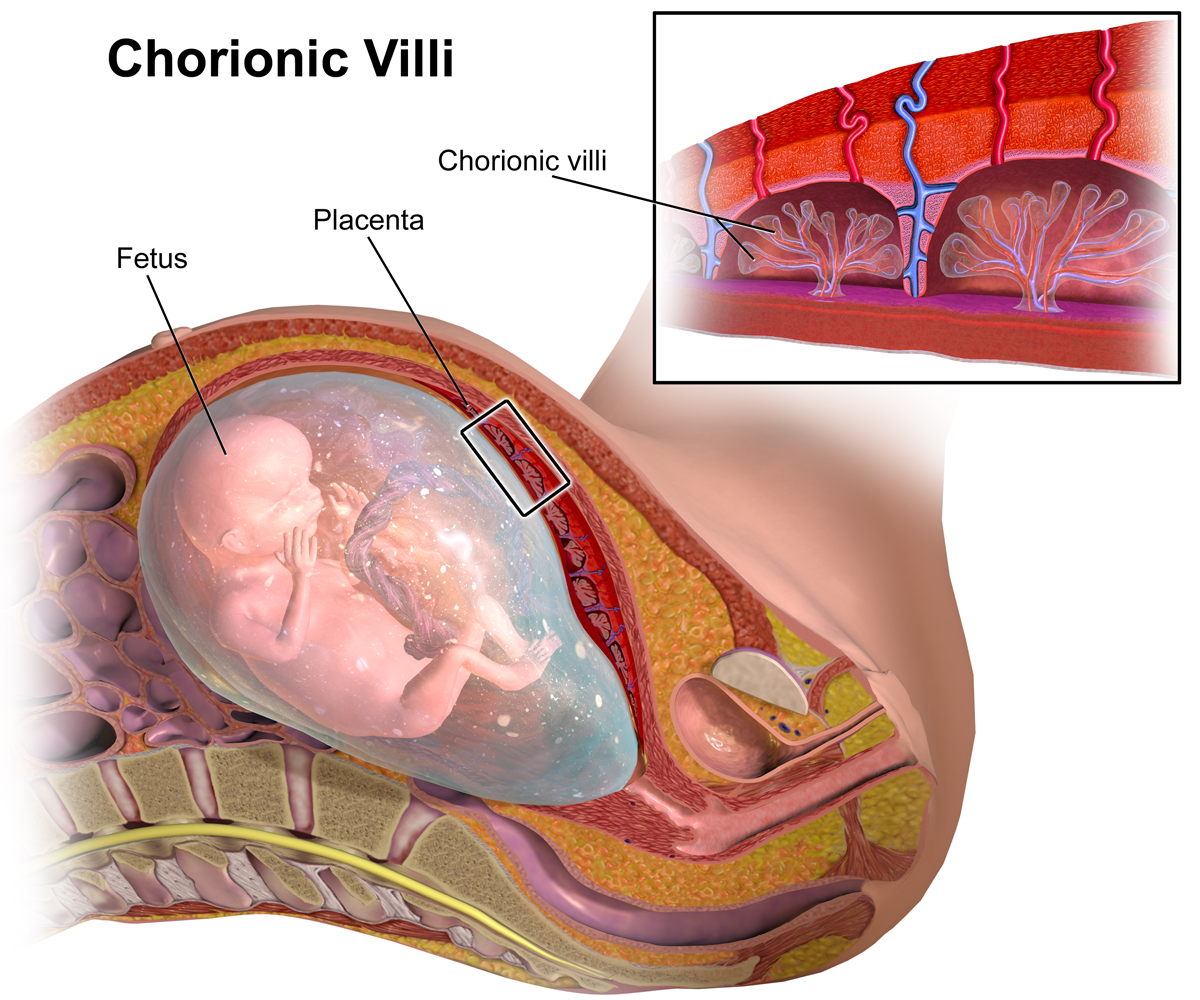

Details
- Days: 24

Identifiers
- MeSH: D002824

Chorionic villi are villi that sprout from the chorion to provide maximal contact area with maternal blood.

They are an essential element in pregnancy from a histomorphologic perspective, and are, by definition, a product of conception. Branches of the umbilical arteries carry embryonic blood to the villi. After circulating through the capillaries of the villi, blood returns to the embryo through the umbilical vein. Thus, villi are part of the border between maternal and fetal blood during pregnancy.

== Structure ==
Villi can also be classified by their relations:

- Floating villi float freely in the intervillous space. They exhibit a bi-layered epithelium consisting of cytotrophoblasts with overlaying syncytium (syncytiotrophoblast).
- Anchoring (stem) villi stabilize the mechanical integrity of the placental-maternal interface.

=== Development ===
The chorion undergoes rapid proliferation and forms numerous processes, the chorionic villi, which invade and destroy the uterine decidua and at the same time absorb from it nutritive materials for the growth of the embryo. They undergo several stages, depending on their composition.

Stage	Description	Period of gestation	Contents
Primary	The chorionic villi are at first small and non-vascular.	13–15 days	trophoblast only
Secondary	The villi increase in size and ramify, while the mesoderm grows into them.	16–21 days	trophoblast and mesoderm
Tertiary	Branches of the umbilical artery and umbilical vein grow into the mesoderm, and in this way the chorionic villi are vascularized.	17–22 days	trophoblast, mesoderm, and blood vessels

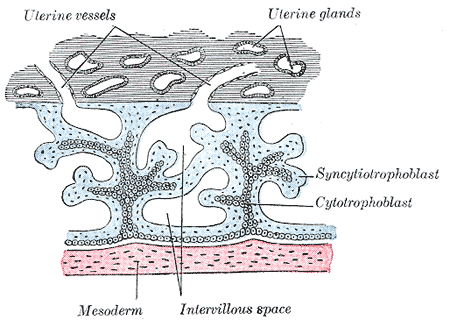
Primary chorionic villi.

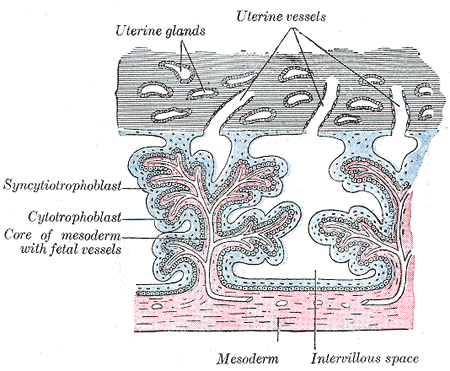
Tertiary chorionic villi.

Until about the end of the second month of pregnancy, the villi cover the entire chorion, and are almost uniform in size—but after then, they develop unequally.

=== Microanatomy ===
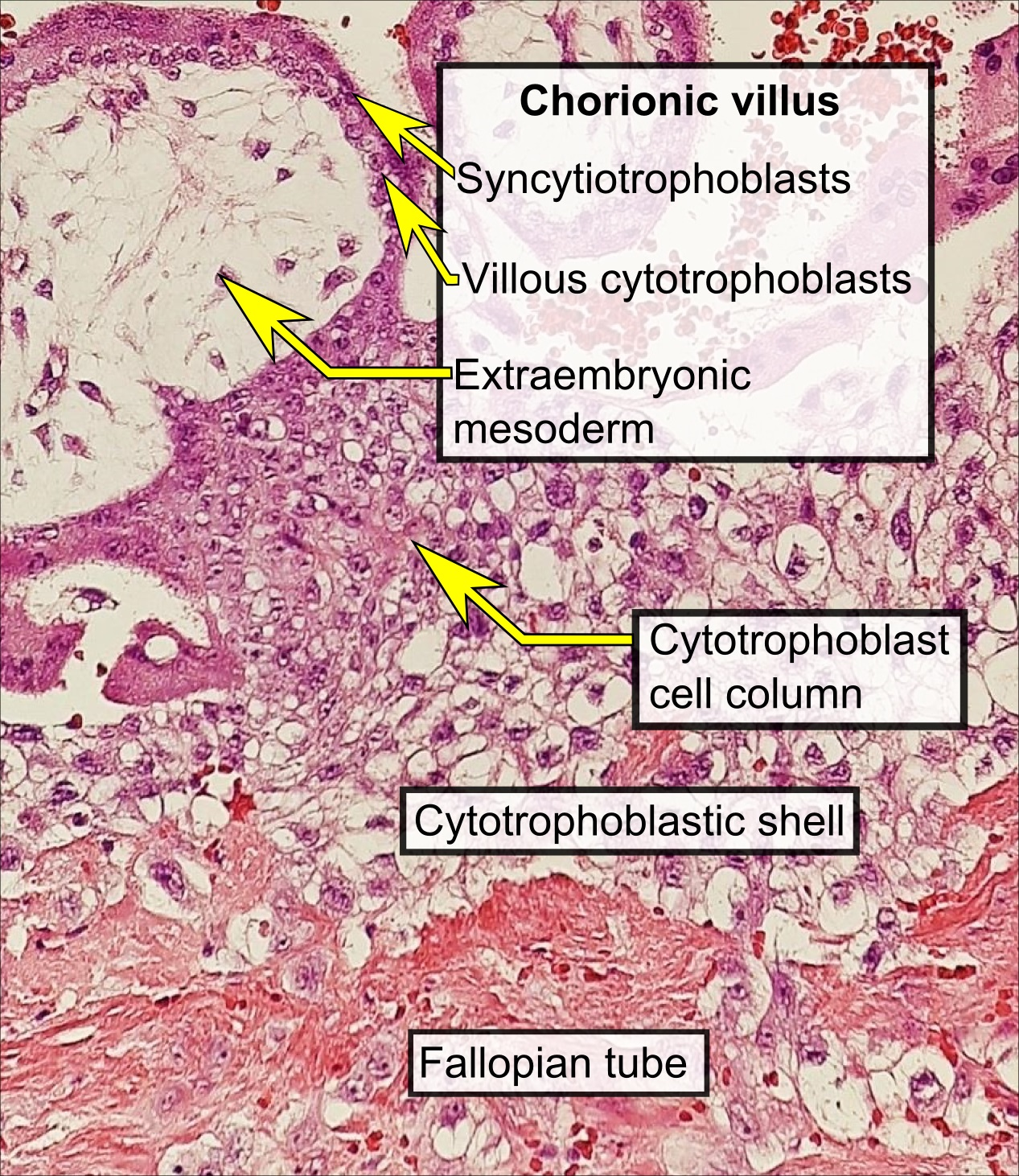
Histopathology of a chorionic villus, in a tubal pregnancy.

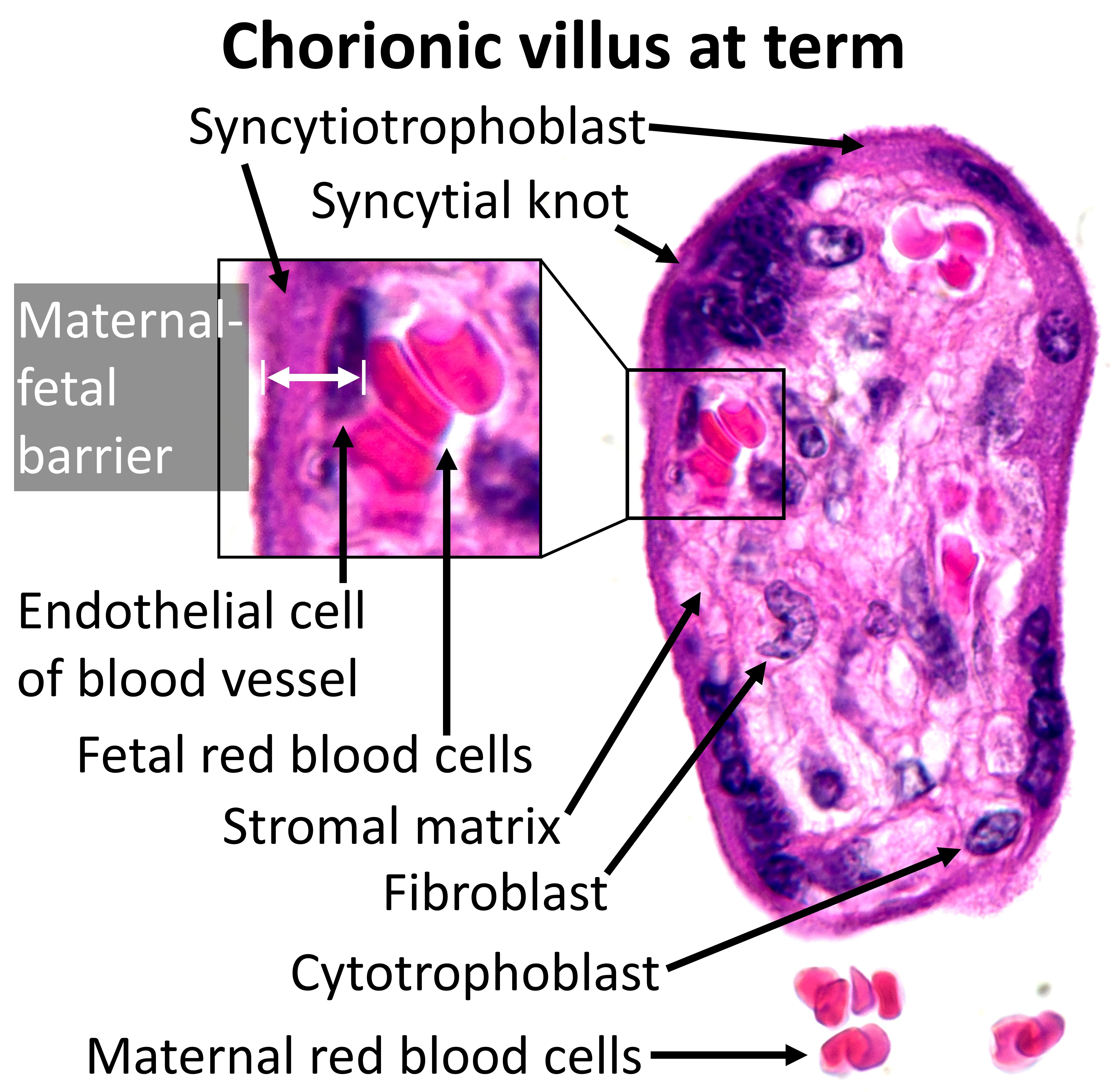
High-magnification H&E micrograph of a cross-section of a chorionic villus at term. The villus is covered by a continuous multinucleated syncytiotrophoblast, including a focal aggregation of syncytial nuclei termed a syncytial knot. The villous core contains connective tissue with fibroblasts and fetal capillaries lined by endothelium. Fetal erythrocytes are contained within the capillaries, whereas maternal erythrocytes lie outside the villi in the intervillous space. A rounded cell immediately beneath the syncytiotrophoblast is labeled as a possible cytotrophoblast; cytotrophoblasts are sparse and discontinuous at term and may be difficult to identify.

The chorionic villi form the principal exchange surface between the maternal and fetal circulations. Maternal blood flows through the intervillous space and directly bathes the external surface of the villi, while fetal blood remains within capillaries in the villous cores. The two circulations therefore normally remain anatomically separate.

The surface of each villus is formed by the syncytiotrophoblast, a continuous, terminally differentiated, multinucleated epithelium without lateral cell boundaries. Its maternal-facing surface bears numerous microvilli that increase the area available for exchange. Beneath it are individual mononuclear villous cytotrophoblasts, which serve as progenitor cells and fuse with the overlying syncytiotrophoblast. Cytotrophoblasts form a conspicuous, nearly continuous layer early in pregnancy but become sparse and discontinuous as gestation advances.

The villous core consists of fetal connective tissue containing capillaries, fibroblasts and fetal macrophages known as Hofbauer cells. Near term, many fetal capillaries are positioned immediately beneath attenuated areas of syncytiotrophoblast. These thin regions, termed vasculosyncytial membranes, minimize the diffusion distance between maternal and fetal blood. The exchange barrier at these sites consists principally of syncytiotrophoblast, closely approximated basement membranes, and fetal capillary endothelium.

Syncytial knots are localized aggregates of syncytiotrophoblastic nuclei protruding from the villous surface. They become more frequent with advancing gestational age and are therefore commonly encountered in mature term placentas. Their presence alone is physiological; only a diffuse or excessive increase relative to gestational age may indicate abnormal villous maturation or maternal vascular malperfusion.

== Clinical significance ==
=== Use for prenatal diagnosis ===
In 1983, an Italian biologist named Giuseppe Simoni discovered a new method of prenatal diagnosis using chorionic villi.

=== Stem cell ===
Chorionic villi are a rich source of stem cells. Biocell Center, a biotech company managed by Giuseppe Simoni, is studying and testing these types of stem cells. Chorionic stem cells, like amniotic stem cells, are uncontroversial multipotent stem cells.

=== Infections ===
Recent studies indicate that the chorionic villi may be susceptible to bacterial and viral infections. Recents findings indicate that ureaplasma parvum can infect the chorionic villi tissues of pregnant women, thereby impacting pregnancy outcome. DNA from JC polyomavirus and Merkel cell polyomavirus has been detected in chorionic villi from pregnant women and women affected by miscarriage. DNA from BK polyomavirus has also been detected in the same tissues but to a lesser extent.

=== Early miscarriage ===
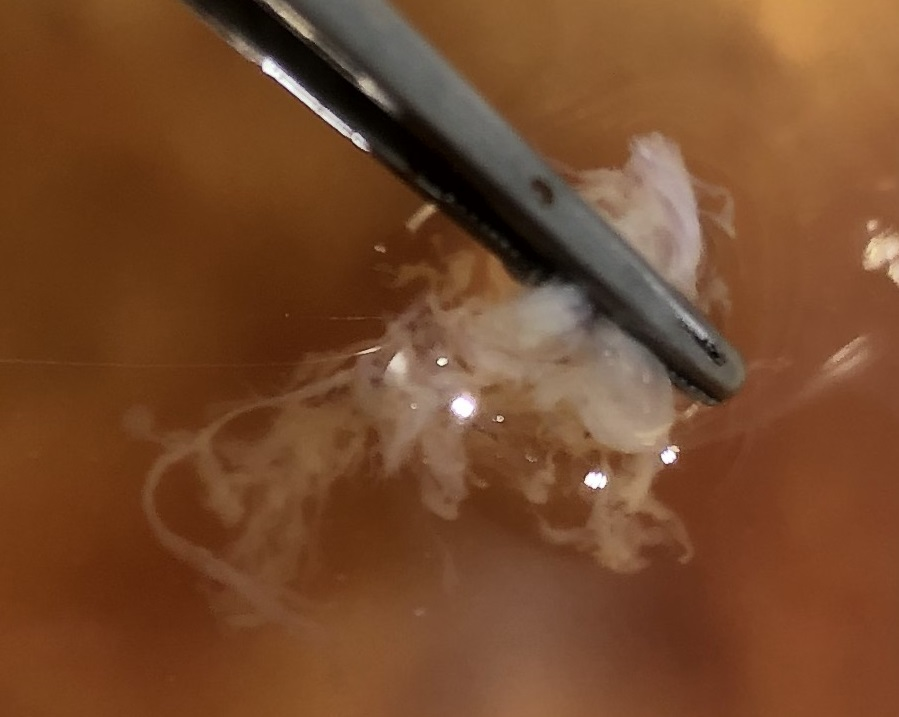
Gross pathology of chorionic villi after a miscarriage.

In early miscarriage, the finding of chorionic villi in vaginal expulsions is often the only definite confirmation that there was an intrauterine pregnancy rather than an ectopic pregnancy.

== Additional images ==
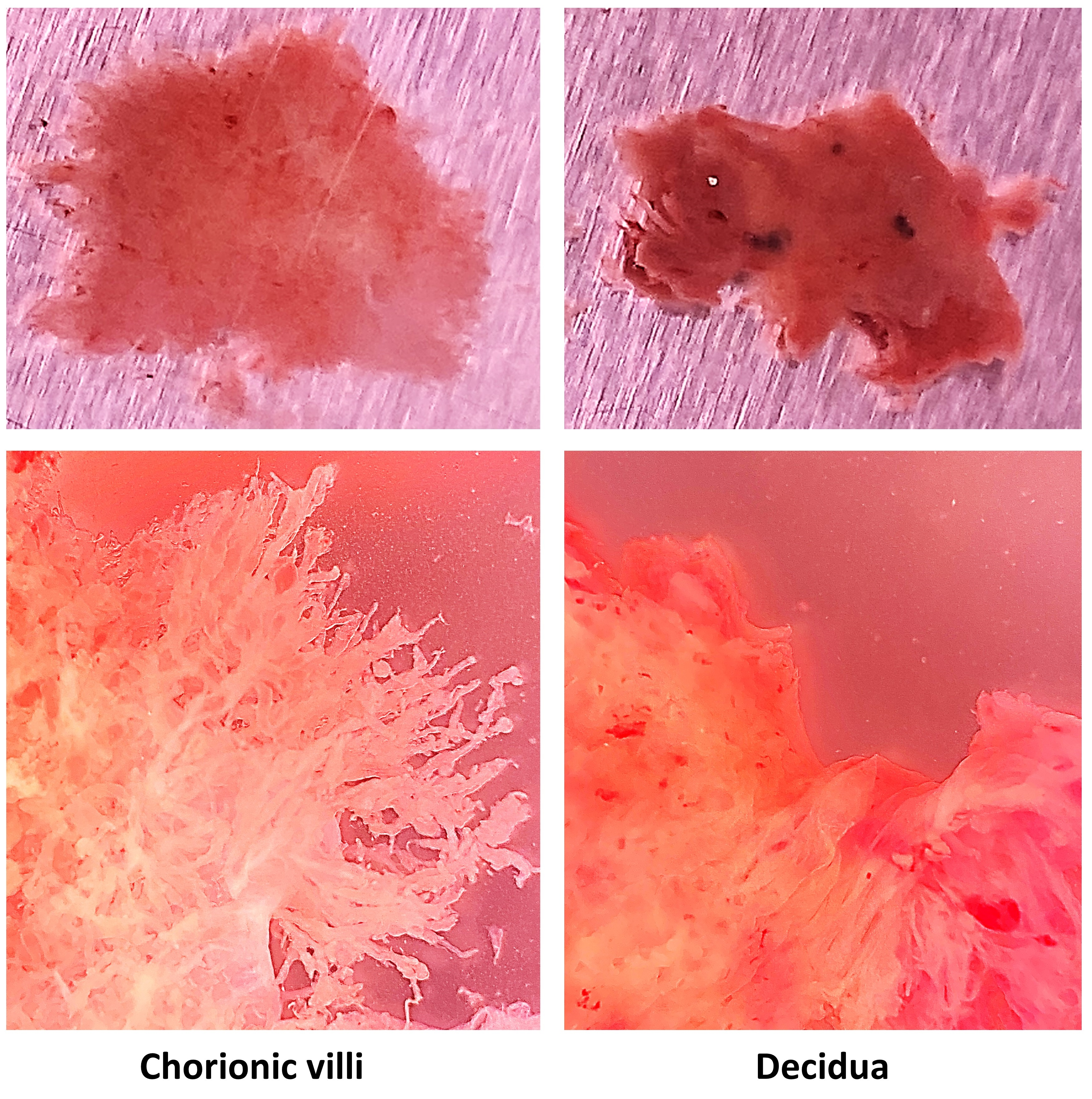
Gross appearance of chorionic villi versus decidua

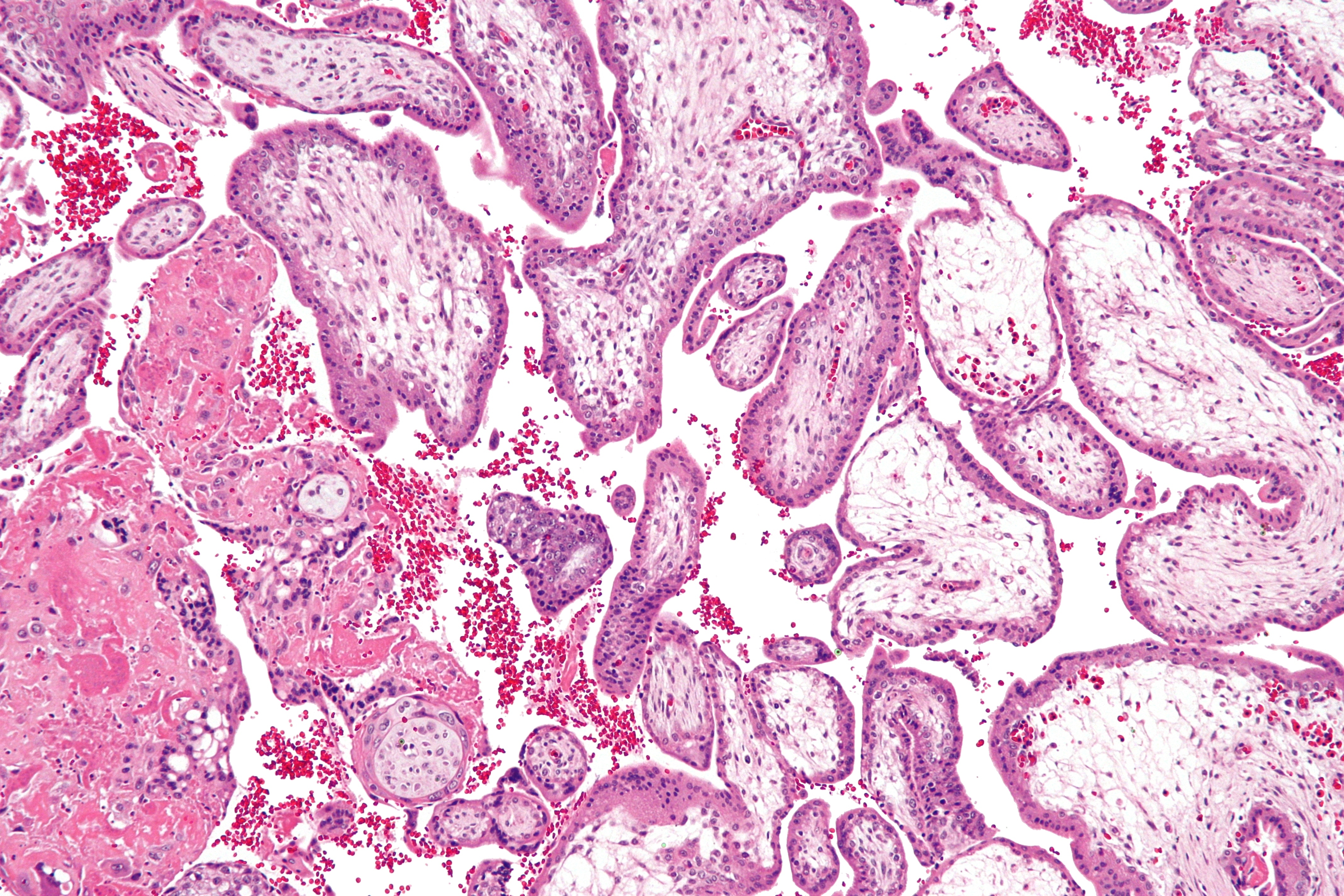
Micrograph showing chorionic villi. Intermediate magnification. H&E stain.

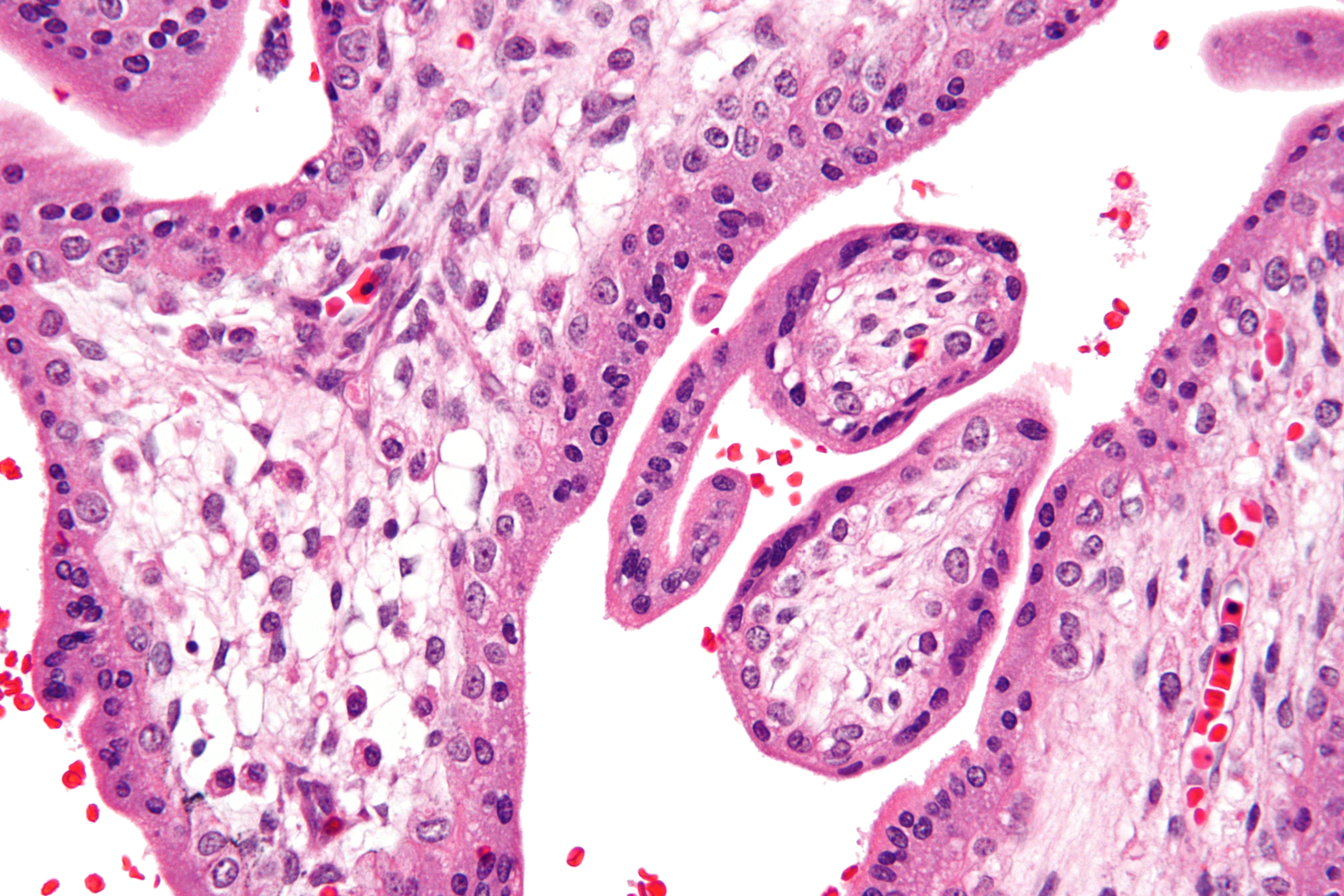
Micrograph showing chorionic villi. Very high magnification. H&E stain.

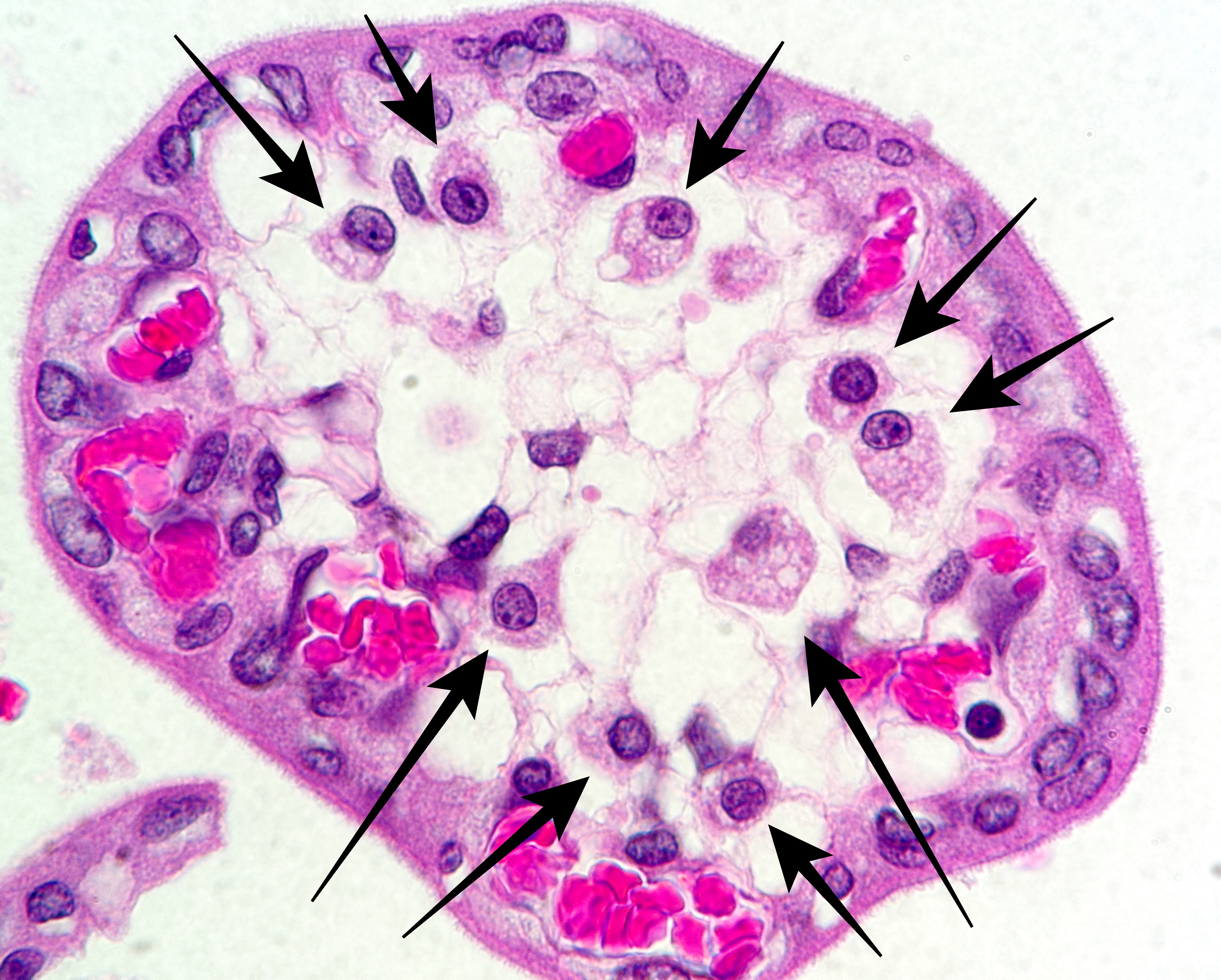
Chorionic villus with Hofbauer cells, annotated by black arrows. H&E stain

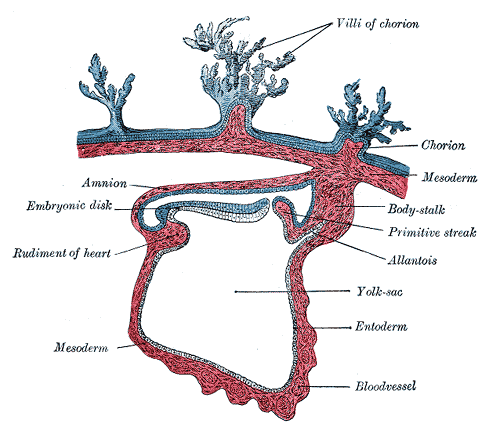
Section through the embryo.

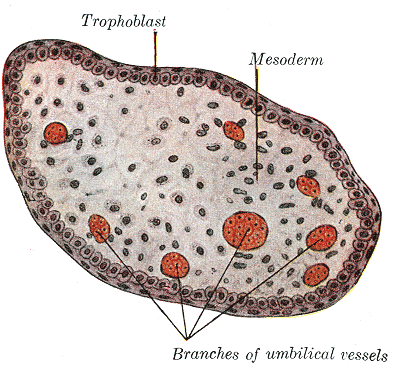
Transverse section of a chorionic villus.

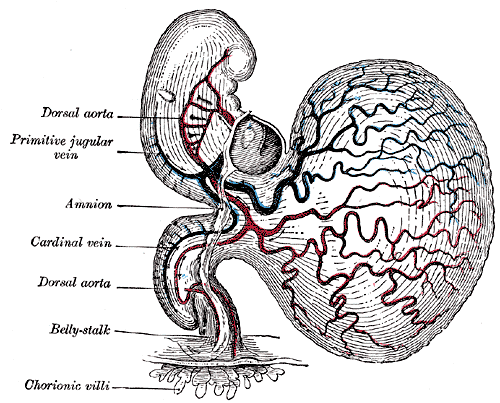
Human embryo of about 28 days, with yolk-sac.

== See also ==
- Villitis of unknown etiology
