= 1963 Italian Senate election in Lombardy =

- 28 April 1963

All 45 Lombard seats to the Italian Senate

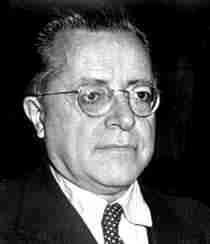

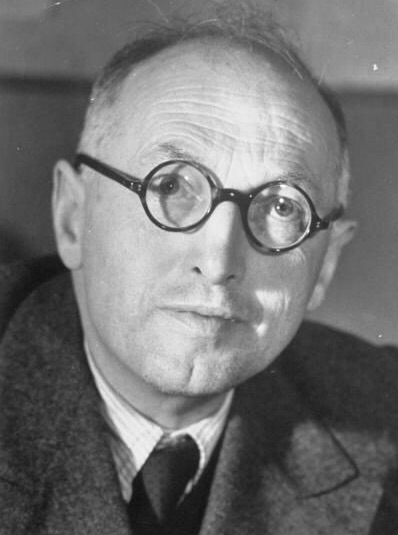
	Majority party	Minority party	Third party
Leader	Aldo Moro	Palmiro Togliatti	Pietro Nenni
Party	DC	PCI	PSI
Last election	44.8%, 16 seats	18.5%, 6 seats	18.5%, 7 seats
Seats won	19	10	8
Seat change	▲3	▲4	▲1
Popular vote	1,757,450	910,939	780,648
Percentage	39.9%	20.7%	17.7%
Swing	▼4.9%	▲2.2%	▼0.8%
Old local plurality before election
DC
New local plurality
DC

Lombardy elected its forth delegation to the Italian Senate on 28 April 1963. This election was a part of national Italian general election of 1963 even if, according to the Italian Constitution, every senatorial challenge in each Region is a single and independent race.

Lombardy obtained twelve more seats to the Senate, following a constitutional reform.

The election was won by the centrist Christian Democracy, as it happened at national level. Eight Lombard provinces gave a majority or at least a plurality to the winning party, while the agricultural Province of Pavia preferred the Italian Communist Party.

== Background ==
The constitutional reform of 1963 created dozens of new senatorial seats to improve the representation of minor parties, but the proportional voting system did not impose changes into the total number of local constituencies. The result was that Christian Democracy (DC) elected the major part of its nominees even if it was weakened by Amintore Fanfani's program to create a centre-left government with the Italian Socialist Party (PSI). If the DC paid its toll to the centre-right Italian Liberal Party, which obtained great results in the bourgeois centre of Milan, the PSI lost votes to the Italian Communist Party, and later it suffered a crisis losing his leftist wing, including senator Giuseppe Roda, which created the Soviet-aligned Italian Socialist Party of Proletarian Unity.

== Electoral system ==
The electoral system for the Senate was a strange hybrid which established a form of proportional representation into FPTP-like constituencies. A candidate needed a landslide victory of more than 65% of votes to obtain a direct mandate. All constituencies where this result was not reached entered into an at-large calculation based upon the D'Hondt method to distribute the seats between the parties, and candidates with the best percentages of suffrage inside their party list were elected.

== Results ==
Party	votes	votes (%)	seats	swing
Christian Democracy	1,757,450	39.9	19	▲3
Italian Communist Party	910,939	20.7	10	▲4
Italian Socialist Party	780,648	17.7	8	▲1
Italian Liberal Party	400,831	9.1	4	▲3
Italian Democratic Socialist Party	300,841	6.8	3	▲1
Italian Social Movement	181,387	4.1	1	=
Others	75,939	1.7	-	=
Total parties	4,408,035	100.0	45	▲12

Sources: Italian Ministry of the Interior

=== Constituencies ===
N°	Constituency	Elected	Party	Votes %	Others
1	Bergamo	Cristoforo Pezzini	Christian Democracy	55.8%	
2	Clusone	Giovanni Zonca	Christian Democracy	66.8%	
3	Treviglio	Daniele Turani	Christian Democracy	61.2%	
4	Brescia	Ludovico Montini	Christian Democracy	43.4%	
5	Breno	Enrico Roselli; Alessandro Morino	Christian Democracy; Italian Democratic Socialist Party	56.9% 10.8%	
6	Chiari	Pietro Cenini	Christian Democracy	57.0%	
7	Salò	Francesco Zane	Christian Democracy	49.0%	
8	Como	Pasquale Valsecchi; Bruno Amoletti	Christian Democracy; Italian Socialist Party	40.3% 20.0%	
9	Lecco	Pietro Amigoni	Christian Democracy	54.8%	
10	Cantù	Mario Martinelli; Ugo Bonafini	Christian Democracy; Italian Socialist Party	52.4% 19.6%	
11	Cremona	Arnaldo Bera	Italian Communist Party	27.1%	Giovanni Lombardi (DC) 38.1%
12	Crema	Ennio Zelioli	Christian Democracy	51.1%	
13	Mantua	Ernesto Zanardi; Tullia Romagnoli	Italian Communist Party; Italian Socialist Party	26.5% 21.6%	Leonello Zenti (DC) 36.2%
14	Ostiglia	Teodosio Aimoni; Gastone Darè	Italian Communist Party; Italian Socialist Party	34.2% 22.8%	Dante Bettoni (DC) 29.7%
15	Milan 1	Giorgio Bergamasco	Italian Liberal Party	29.8%	
16	Milan 2	Luigi Grassi; Gastone Nencioni	Italian Liberal Party; Italian Social Movement	27.5% 8.4%	
17	Milan 3	Lea Alcidi Boccacci; Italo Viglianesi	Italian Liberal Party; Italian Democratic Socialist Party	21.4% 10.8%	
18	Milan 4	Vincenzo Palumbo; Edgardo Lami Starnuti	Italian Liberal Party; Italian Democratic Socialist Party	25.1% 9.8%	
19	Milan 5	Ugo Bartesaghi	Italian Communist Party	25.7%	Pietro Caleffi (PSI) 19.8% Antonio Coppi (PLI) 13.0%
20	Milan 6	Piero Montagnani; Giuseppe Roda	Italian Communist Party; Italian Socialist Party	29.1% 21.2%	
21	Abbiategrasso	Emanuele Samek Lodovici; Carlo Arnaudi	Christian Democracy; Italian Socialist Party	40.8% 20.5%	
22	Rho	Tommaso Ajroldi; Gianfranco Maris; Arialdo Banfi	Christian Democracy; Italian Communist Party; Italian Socialist Party	39.6% 26.2% 20.4%	
23	Monza	Gianmaria Cornaggia	Christian Democracy	42.9%	
24	Vimercate	Guido Corbellini	Christian Democracy	50.1%	
25	Lodi	Giordano Dell'Amore; Francesco Scotti	Christian Democracy; Italian Communist Party	42.8% 28.1%	
26	Pavia	Pietro Vergani	Italian Communist Party	30.8%	Pietro Ferreri (DC) 28.6%
27	Voghera	Giorgio Piovano	Italian Communist Party	29.6%	Giovanni Celasco (DC) 32.5%
28	Vigevano	Giovanni Brambilla	Italian Communist Party	38.6%	
29	Sondrio	Athos Valsecchi	Christian Democracy	55.9%	
30	Varese	Noè Pajetta	Christian Democracy	39.7%	
31	Busto Arsizio	Natale Santero; Guido Canziani	Christian Democracy; Italian Socialist Party	43.2% 19.6%	

- Senators with a direct mandate have bold percentages. The electoral system was, in the other cases, a form of proportional representation and not a FPTP race: so candidates winning with a simple plurality could have (and usually had) a candidate (usually a Christian democrat) with more votes in their constituency.

=== Substitutions ===
- Giovanni Lombardi for Cremona (38.1%) replaced Pietro Amigoni in 1963. Reason: death.
- Leonello Zenti for Mantua (36.2%) replaced Giordano Dell'Amore in 1963. Reason: business incompatibility.
- Pietro Caleffi for Milan 5 (19.8%) replaced Bruno Amoletti in 1964. Reason: recount.
- Giovanni Celasco for Voghera (32.5%) replaced Daniele Turani in 1964. Reason: death.
- Dante Bettoni for Ostiglia (29.7%) replaced Enrico Roselli in 1964. Reason: death.
- Pietro Ferreri for Pavia (28.6%) replaced Noè Pajetta in 1966. Reason: death.
- Antonio Coppi for Milan 5 (13.0%) replaced Luigi Grassi in 1967. Reason: resignation.
