= Borghi (surname) =

Borghi is an Italian surname.

== Geographical distribution ==
As of 2014, 75.0% of all known bearers of the surname Borghi were residents of Italy (frequency 1:2,767), 13.3% of Brazil (1:52,225), 5.6% of Argentina (1:25,921), 2.3% of the United States (1:526,605) and 1.9% of France (1:115,867).

In Italy, the frequency of the surname was higher than national average (1:2,767) in the following regions:

1. Emilia-Romagna (1:474)
2. Lombardy (1:1,121)
3. Tuscany (1:2,470)

== People ==
- Adelaide Borghi-Mamo (1826–1901), Italian operatic mezzo-soprano
- Alessandro Borghi (disambiguation)
- Ayres Borghi-Zerni (fl. 1895–1928), Italian operatic soprano
- Catherine Borghi (born 1976), Swiss alpine skier
- Christel Borghi, Swiss figure skater
- Claudio Borghi (born 1964), Argentine footballer and manager
- Elena Borghi (born 2002), Italian canoeist
- Frank Borghi (1925–2015), American soccer player
- Henri Borghi, O.S.M. (1609–1658), Roman Catholic prelate, Bishop of Alife
- Luigi Borghi (c.1745–c.1806), Italian composer who worked in London
- Max Borghi (born 2000), American football player
- Paolo Borghi (born 1961), Italian high jumper
- Ruggero Borghi (born 1970), Italian cyclist
