= Demattè =

Demattè is a surname. Notable people with the surname include:

- Claudio Demattè (1942–2004), Italian economist
- Luca Demattè (born 1990), Italian pair skater
