= List of presidents of the Province of Sondrio =

President of the Province of Sondrio
- Presidente della Provincia di Sondrio
- Incumbent; Davide Menegola since 30 January 2023
- Term length: 4 years
- Inaugural holder: Gian Giacomo Paribelli
- Formation: 1889

The president of the Province of Sondrio is the head of the provincial government in Sondrio, Lombardy, Italy. The president oversees the administration of the province, coordinates the activities of the municipalities, and represents the province in regional and national matters.

Since January 2023, the office has been held by Davide Menegola, a civic independent.

== List ==
=== Presidents of the Provincial Deputation (1889–1924) ===
No.	Portrait	Name	Term		Party
No.	Portrait	Name	Start	End	Party
1		Gian Giacomo Paribelli	1889	1894	
2		Giacomo Orsatti	1895	1898	
3		Antonio Del Felice	1899	1904	
4		Emilio Quadrio de' Maria Pontaschelli	1905	1911	
5		Giuseppe Guicciardi	1912	1919	
6		Enrico Vitali	1920	1923	

=== Presidents of the Royal Commission (1924–1929) ===
No.	Portrait	Name	Term		Party
No.	Portrait	Name	Start	End	Party
1		Giulio Bertoldi	1924	1926	National Fascist Party
2		Emilio Bosatta	1926	1929	National Fascist Party

=== Presidents of the Provincial Rectorate (1929–1945) ===
No.	Portrait	Name	Term		Party
No.	Portrait	Name	Start	End	Party
1		Arnaldo Sertoli	1929	1931	National Fascist Party
2		Gerolamo Morelli	1931	1933	National Fascist Party
3		Emilio Bosatta	1933	1937	National Fascist Party
4		Bruno Credaro	1938	1941	National Fascist Party
5		Ugo Martinola	1942	1943	National Fascist Party
6		Filippo Orsatti	1943	1944	Republican Fascist Party
7		Bruno Giacconi	1944	1945	Republican Fascist Party

=== Presidents of the Provincial Deputation (1945–1951) ===
No.	Portrait	Name	Term		Party
No.	Portrait	Name	Start	End	Party
1		Ambrogio Caccia Dominioni	1945	1946	Christian Democracy
2		Angelo Schena	1946	1950	Christian Democracy

=== Presidents of the Province (1951–present) ===
No.	Portrait	Name	Term		Party
No.	Portrait	Name	Start	End	Party
1		Michele Melazzini	1951	1956	Christian Democracy
1		Michele Melazzini	1956	1960	Christian Democracy
1		Michele Melazzini	1960	1964	Christian Democracy
2		Arturo Schena	1965	1970	Christian Democracy
3		Giorgio Scaramellini	1970	1975	Christian Democracy
4		Luigi Dassogno	1975	1980	Christian Democracy
5		Roberto Marchini	1980	1985	Christian Democracy
5		Roberto Marchini	1985	26 July 1990	Christian Democracy
6		Tito Bottà	26 July 1990	23 April 1993	Christian Democracy
7		Sergio Pasina	23 April 1993	24 April 1995	Christian Democracy
8		Enrico Dioli	25 April 1995	28 June 1999	Italian People's Party
9		Eugenio Tarabini	28 June 1999	28 June 2004	Rhaetian Populars
10		Fiorello Provera	28 June 2004	11 June 2009	Lega Nord
11		Massimo Sertori	11 June 2009	29 September 2014	Lega Nord
12		Luca Della Bitta	29 September 2014	31 October 2018	Independent (centre-right)
13		Elio Moretti	31 October 2018	30 January 2023	Independent (centre-right)
14		Davide Menegola	30 January 2023	Incumbent	Civic list

== Sources ==
- "Storia amministrativa dell'ente". Ministero dell'Interno.
- "Amministratori alla guida della Provincia di Sondrio dal 1859 ad oggi". Provincia di Sondrio.
- Menichini, Piera (2005). "I presidenti delle Province dall'Unità alla Grande guerra: repertorio analitico". Storia Amministrazione Costituzione (13): 291–292.
