= Tarabini =

Tarabini is a surname. Notable people with the surname include:

- Aníbal Tarabini (1941–1997), Argentine footballer
- Ayelén Tarabini (born 1992), Argentine artistic gymnast
- Eugenio Tarabini (1930–2018), Italian politician
- Patricia Tarabini (born 1968), Argentine tennis player
