= Great North =

Political party in Italy

Great North Confederation Confederazione Grande Nord
- President: Roberto Bernardelli
- Founded: 12 December 2017
- Dissolved: 19 July 2025
- Split from: Lega Nord
- Merged into: Pact for the North
- Headquarters: Piazza Missori, 1 Milan
- Ideology: Regionalism; Federalism; Liberalism
- National affiliation: Freedom (2024)

Website
- Confederazione Grande Nord

Great North (Grande Nord, GN) was a liberal, regionalist, federalist, and somewhat separatist political party based in Northern Italy. The party proposes federalism and liberal economics, aimed at reducing "the size of the state in order to free enterprises, workers and communities, always putting who works and produce first". GN claims to adhere to the Oxford Manifesto and the values of the Liberal International.

== History ==
The party was founded in December 2017 by prominent former members of Lega Nord (LN), including Marco Reguzzoni (leader of The Republicans), Roberto Bernardelli (leader of Padanian Union, Lombard Independence, and Make the North Great Again), Fabrizio Comencini (leader of Liga Veneta Repubblica, member of Independence We Veneto), Angelo Alessandri (leader of I Change), Giuseppe Leoni, Oreste Rossi, Francesca Martini, and Marco Desiderati. Some of them (Reguzzoni, Alessandri, Leoni, Rossi, Martini, and Desiderati) had been loyalists of Umberto Bossi, founder and leader of LN until April 2012, and had left that party in opposition to Roberto Maroni and Matteo Salvini, Bossi's successors; others (Bernardelli and Comencini) had opposed Bossi, and left the LN decades ago. All of them opposed the leadership of Salvini for its right-wing populist turn and his Italian national strategy. Bossi attended the party's founding convention but did not join.

In the 2018 Italian general election, GN fielded candidates only in a few constituencies and obtained 0.1% of the vote. In the run-up of the 2024 European Parliament election in Italy, the party formed a pact with South calls North, through the Freedom electoral list, while Reguzzoni accepted to be a candidate for Forza Italia.

The party merged into Pact for the North on 19 July 2025.

== Election results ==
=== Italian Parliament ===
Election	Leader	Chamber of Deputies				Senate of the Republic			
Election	Leader	Votes	%	Seats	+/–	Votes	%	Seats	+/–
2018	Marco Reguzzoni	19,846	0.06	0 / 630	New	17,507	0.06	0 / 315	New

=== European Parliament ===
Election	Leader	Votes	%	Seats	+/–	EP Group
2024	Roberto Bernardelli	Into Freedom		0 / 76	New	–

=== Regional elections ===
Region	Election	Candidate	Votes	%	Seats	+/–
Lombardy	2018	Giulio Arrighini	13,793	0.26	0 / 80	New

== See also ==
- List of political parties in Italy
