= Nicola Gunnar Vincenzi =

Italian politician (born 1964)

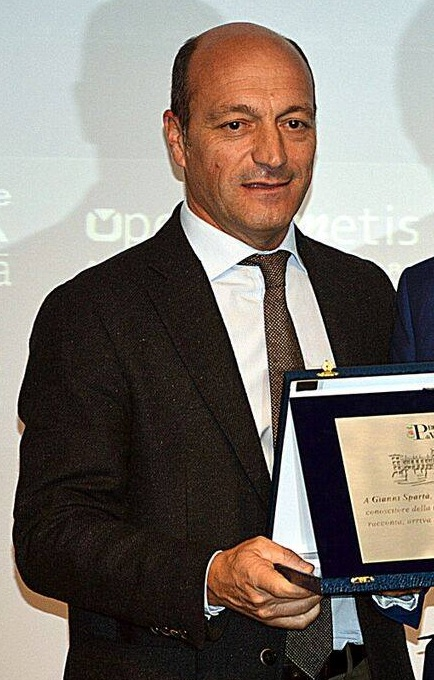
- Vincenzi in 2015

President of the Province of Varese
- In office 13 October 2014 – 31 October 2018
- Preceded by: Dario Galli
- Succeeded by: Emanuele Antonelli

Mayor of Cantello
- Incumbent
- Assumed office 9 June 2024
- In office 8 June 2009 – 26 May 2019

Personal details
- Born: 29 March 1964 (age 62) Milan, Italy
- Occupation: Lawyer

Emanuele Antonelli (born 29 March 1964) is an Italian politician who served as president of the Province of Varese from 2014 to 2018. He has served as mayor of Cantello since 2024.

In October 2014, Vincenzi was elected president of the Province of Varese as the candidate supported by the Democratic Party together with the New Centre-Right, defeating centre-right candidate Silvana Alberio with 54% of the weighted vote. During his presidency, Vincenzi reported a budget deficit of around €50 million, prompting the provincial administration to adopt a multi-year financial recovery plan in 2016. The deficit became the subject of a political dispute over the financial management of the previous administration, led by Dario Galli.
