= List of presidents of the Province of Varese =

President of the Province of Varese
- Presidente della Provincia di Varese

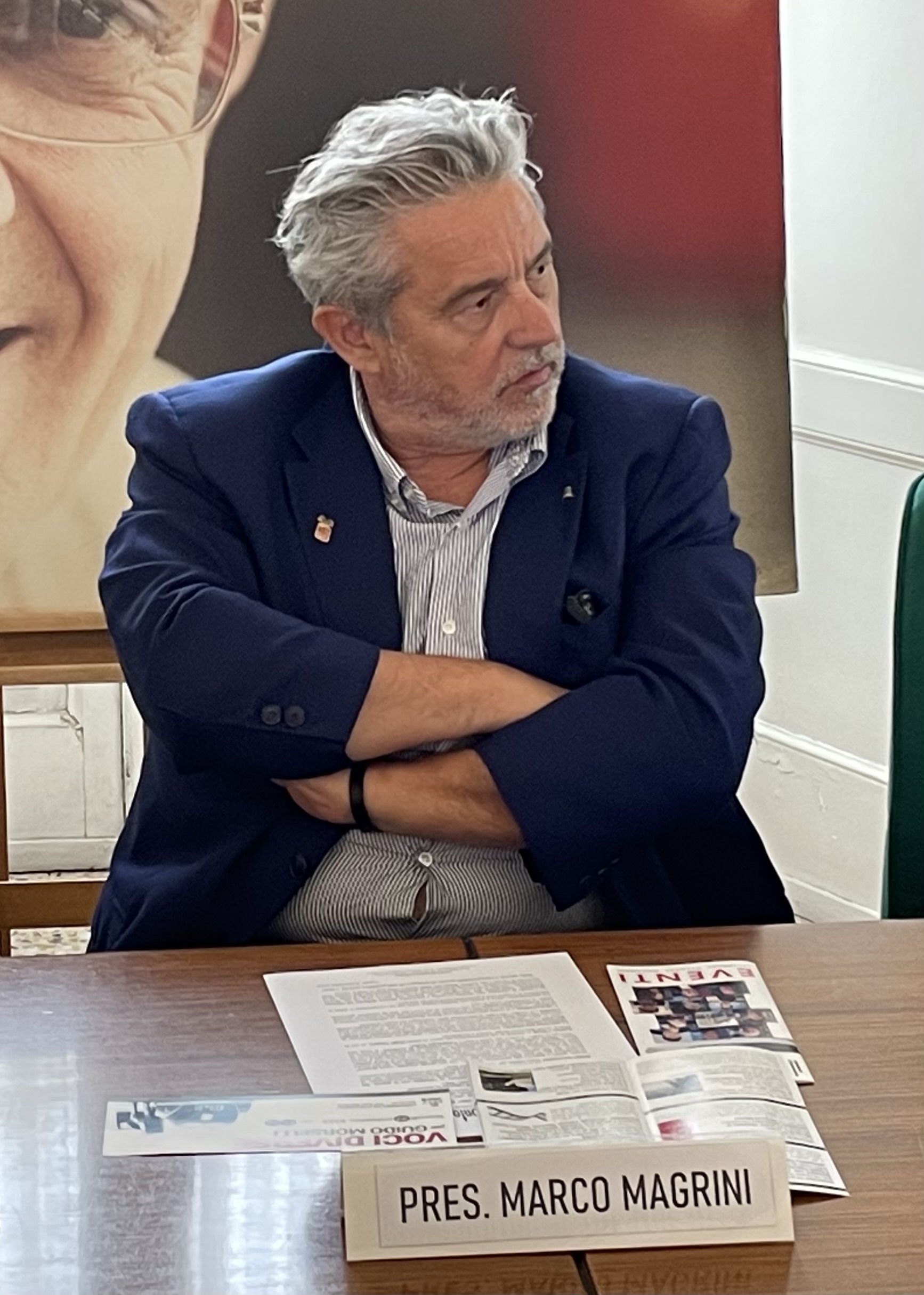
- Incumbent; Marco Magrini since 30 January 2023
- Term length: 4 years
- Inaugural holder: Giovanni Puricelli
- Formation: 1929

The president of the Province of Varese is the head of the provincial government in Varese, Lombardy, Italy. The president oversees the administration of the province, coordinates the activities of the municipalities, and represents the province in regional and national matters.

Since January 2023, the office has been held by Marco Magrini, a civic independent.

== List ==
=== Presidents of the Provincial Rectorate (1927–1945) ===
No.	Portrait	Name	Term of office		Party
No.	Portrait	Name	Start	End	Party
–		Aldo Bonfiglio	31 March 1927	19 May 1929	Royal commissioner
1		Giovanni Puricelli	19 May 1929	20 December 1943	National Fascist Party
2		Giuseppe Bruni	20 December 1943	20 May 1944	Republican Fascist Party
–		Decio Jodice Boffillo	20 May 1944	26 April 1945	Prefectural commissioner

=== Presidents of the Provincial Deputation (1945–1951) ===
No.	Portrait	Name	Term of office		Party
No.	Portrait	Name	Start	End	Party
–		Luigi Roncari	26 April 1945	5 August 1945	Italian Socialist Party
1		Luigi Roncari	5 August 1945	1 March 1948	Italian Socialist Party
2		Gerolamo Piccinelli	1 March 1948	24 May 1948	?
3		Luciano Vignati	24 May 1948	19 June 1951	?

=== Presidents of the Province (1951–present) ===
No.	Portrait	Name	Term of office		Party
No.	Portrait	Name	Start	End	Party
1		Guido Sironi	19 June 1951	4 September 1952	Christian Democracy
2		Noè Pajetta	4 September 1952	26 June 1956	Christian Democracy
3		Aristide Marchetti	26 June 1956	4 August 1962	Christian Democracy
4		Fausto Franchi	4 August 1962	28 September 1975	Christian Democracy
5		Attilio Spozio	28 September 1975	10 April 1979	Italian Socialist Party
6		Giovanni Marchesi	10 April 1979	16 September 1980	Italian Democratic Socialist Party
7		Alfonso Spozio	16 September 1980	23 July 1990	Italian Socialist Party
8		Vittorio Minelli	23 July 1990	3 August 1992	Christian Democracy
9		Maria Fiorina Ripamonti	3 August 1992	3 August 1993	Democratic Party of the Left
–		Armando Levante	3 August 1993	6 December 1993	Prefectural commissioner
10		Massimo Ferrario	6 December 1993	1 December 1997	Lega Nord
10		Massimo Ferrario	1 December 1997	28 May 2002	Lega Nord
11		Marco Reguzzoni	28 May 2002	29 May 2007	Lega Nord
11		Marco Reguzzoni	29 May 2007	26 February 2008	Lega Nord
–		Guido Iadanza	26 February 2008	15 April 2008	Prefectural commissioner
12		Dario Galli	15 April 2008	22 April 2013	Lega Nord
–		Dario Galli	22 April 2013	13 October 2014	Special commissioner
13		Nicola Gunnar Vincenzi	13 October 2014	31 October 2018	Independent (centre-left)
14		Emanuele Antonelli	31 October 2018	30 January 2023	Forza Italia; Brothers of Italy
15		Marco Magrini	30 January 2023	Incumbent	Civic list

== Sources ==
- "Storia amministrativa dell'ente". Ministero dell'Interno.
