= Davide Menegola =

Italian politician (born 1969)

President of the Province of Sondrio
- Incumbent
- Assumed office 30 January 2023
- Preceded by: Elio Moretti

Mayor of Talamona
- Incumbent
- Assumed office 22 September 2020
- Preceded by: Fabrizio Trivella

Personal details
- Born: 27 September 1969 (age 56) Talamona, Province of Sondrio, Italy

Davide Menegola (born 27 September 1969) is an Italian politician serving as president of the Province of Sondrio since 2023. He has served as mayor of Talamona since 2020.

In January 2023, Menegola was elected president of the Province of Sondrio as an independent civic candidate supported by the Lega and centre-left local administrators.
