= The Republicans (Italy) =

Think tank and political association

- Formation: June 2, 2015; 9 years ago
- Type: ONG
- Purpose: Fusionism, Conservatism
- Headquarters: Milan
- President: Marco Reguzzoni
- Key people: Nunzia De Girolamo, Flavio Tosi, Giacomo Zucco, Enzo Raisi
- Budget: Unknown (2015)
- Website: repubblicani.info

The Republicans (Italian: I Repubblicani) is a non-partisan think tank and association in Italy, that operates like federation between several conservative and libertarian organization, as Tea Party Italy, Modernize Italy, as well as businessmen, local politicians and activist.

The organization, launched by Marco Reguzzoni (member and former leader in the Chamber of Deputies of Lega Nord) and Nunzia De Girolamo (member and former leader in the Chamber of the New Centre-Right) on 2 June 2015 (Republic Day), aims at uniting the Italian centre-right by taking example from the United States Republican Party and American-styled fusionism between conservative and libertarian political propositions.

In June the Varese provincial section of Lega Lombarda–Lega Nord expelled Reguzzoni from the party for having launched The Republicans.

== Program ==
The association support several reforms, overstep the parties:

- Cut to public spending and tax cut
- Laws for the political transparency and against bureaucracy
- Abolition of the property tax and the taxes on salaries and pensions
- VAT on 15%
- Income tax on 20%
- Free trade between enterprises of different countries
- Abolition of the Dublin Regulation and immigration reform

== Leadership ==
- President: Marco Reguzzoni (2015–present)
