= Business economics =

Academic discipline

Business economics is a field in applied economics that uses economic theory and quantitative methods to analyze business enterprises and the factors contributing to the diversity of organizational structures and the relationships of firms with labour, capital and product markets. A professional focus of the journal Business Economics has been expressed as providing "practical information for people who apply economics in their jobs."

Business economics is an integral part of traditional economics and extends economic concepts to real-world business situations. It is an applied science in the sense that it is a tool for managerial decision-making and planning. In other words, business economics concerns the application of economic theory to business management. Macroeconomic factors are at times applied in this analysis. Business economics is based on microeconomics in two categories: positive and negative.

Business economics focuses on the economic issues and problems related to business organization, management, and strategy. Issues and problems include: an explanation of why corporate firms emerge and exist; why they expand: horizontally, vertically and spatially; the role of entrepreneurs and entrepreneurship; the significance of organizational structure; the relationship of firms with employees, providers of capital, customers, and government; and interactions between firms and the business environment.

== Ambiguity in the use of the term ==
The term 'business economics' is used in a variety of ways. Sometimes it is used synonymously with industrial economics/industrial organisation, managerial economics, and economics for business. Still, there may be substantial differences in the usage of 'economics for business' and 'managerial economics', with the latter used more narrowly. One view of the distinction between the two is that business economics has a wider scope than industrial economics, in that it is concerned not only with "industry" but also with service-sector businesses. Economics for business examines the major principles of economics and applies them to the real world of business. Managerial economics is the application of economic methods in the managerial decision-making process.

Business economics is a branch of economics, often regarded as the combination of economic theories and relevant theories related to business management. Business economics is the study of how economic theories are affected by the performance of businesses and business activities in practice. Many practical case studies have used economic theories in corporate development. For example, the product life cycle theory has discussed the entire product life cycle based on the economic perspective, which can be categorized by introduction, growth, maturity, and decline. Apple Inc. is a multinational technological company that focuses on the design and development of electronic products as well as software development. iPhone is one of the company's competitive advantages, generating massive profits. However, since the smartphone product has entered the maturity-to-decline stage, Apple Inc. has also pursued research and development in new product areas, such as electric vehicles, as the competitive environment in the smartphone market has intensified and profit margins have declined. This example clearly illustrates how economic theories support decision-making in practical business organisations.

However, Andrei alludes to the fact that although economic theories could provide the theoretical perception to explain the business context, it could be still hard for managers to make an accurate business decision in the organisational management as the economic theories are built on some certain assumptions in the modelling environment, but in the practical business environment is much complex and hard to predict. Economic theory considerations do not mean the business decision will always be accurate. Hence, in the practical business environment, managers should not only consider the application of economic theories but also be mindful of internal and external factors within the organisation when making decisions.

== Interpretations from various universities ==
Many universities offer courses in business economics and offer a range of interpretations as to the meaning of the word. The Bachelor of Business Economics (BBE) Program at University of Delhi is designed to meet the growing need for an analytical and quantitative approach to problem solving in the changing corporate world by the application of the latest techniques evolved in the fields of economics and business. The Autonomous University of Barcelona (UAB), the Universidad Pública de Navarra (UPNa) and the University of the Balearic Islands (UIB) developed an official Master of Science in Management, Organization and Business Economics focused on management and business topics to train professionals in the study of organizations, on a conceptual and quantitative basis. To achieve this, advanced analysis tools are used from the fields of Neoclassical economics, New institutional economics, Statistics, Econometrics, and Operations research. This focus is complemented by contributing ideas and theories to develop the necessary instruments to facilitate the management of sophisticated and complex organizations.

The program at Harvard University uses economic methods to analyze practical aspects of business, including business administration, management, and related fields of business economics. The Universidad del Desarrollo, in Chile, follows the Harvard University definition, adding entrepreneurship as a field of business. The University of Miami defines business economics as the study of how we use our resources to produce, distribute, and consume goods and services. This requires business economists to analyze social institutions, banks, the stock market, the government, and their relationships with labor negotiations, taxes, international trade, and urban and environmental issues.

Courses at the University of Manchester interpret business economics as concerned with the economic analysis of how businesses contribute to the welfare of society rather than that of an individual or a business. This is done via an examination of the relationship between ownership, control and firm objectives; theories of the growth of the firm; the behavioural theory of the firm; theories of entrepreneurship; the factors that influence the structure, conduct and performance of business at the industry level.

Italian universities borrow their concept of business economics from the tradition of Gino Zappa, for example a standard course at the Politecnico di Milano involves studying corporate governance, accounting, investment analysis, budgeting and business strategy.

La Trobe University of Melbourne, Australia, associates business economics with the process of demand, supply, and equilibrium, coordinating the behaviour of individuals and businesses in the market. Also, business economics extends to government policy, economic variables, and international factors that influence business and competition.

== See also ==
- Industrial organisation
- Business studies
