= Hofbauer cell =

Oval eosinophilic histiocytes

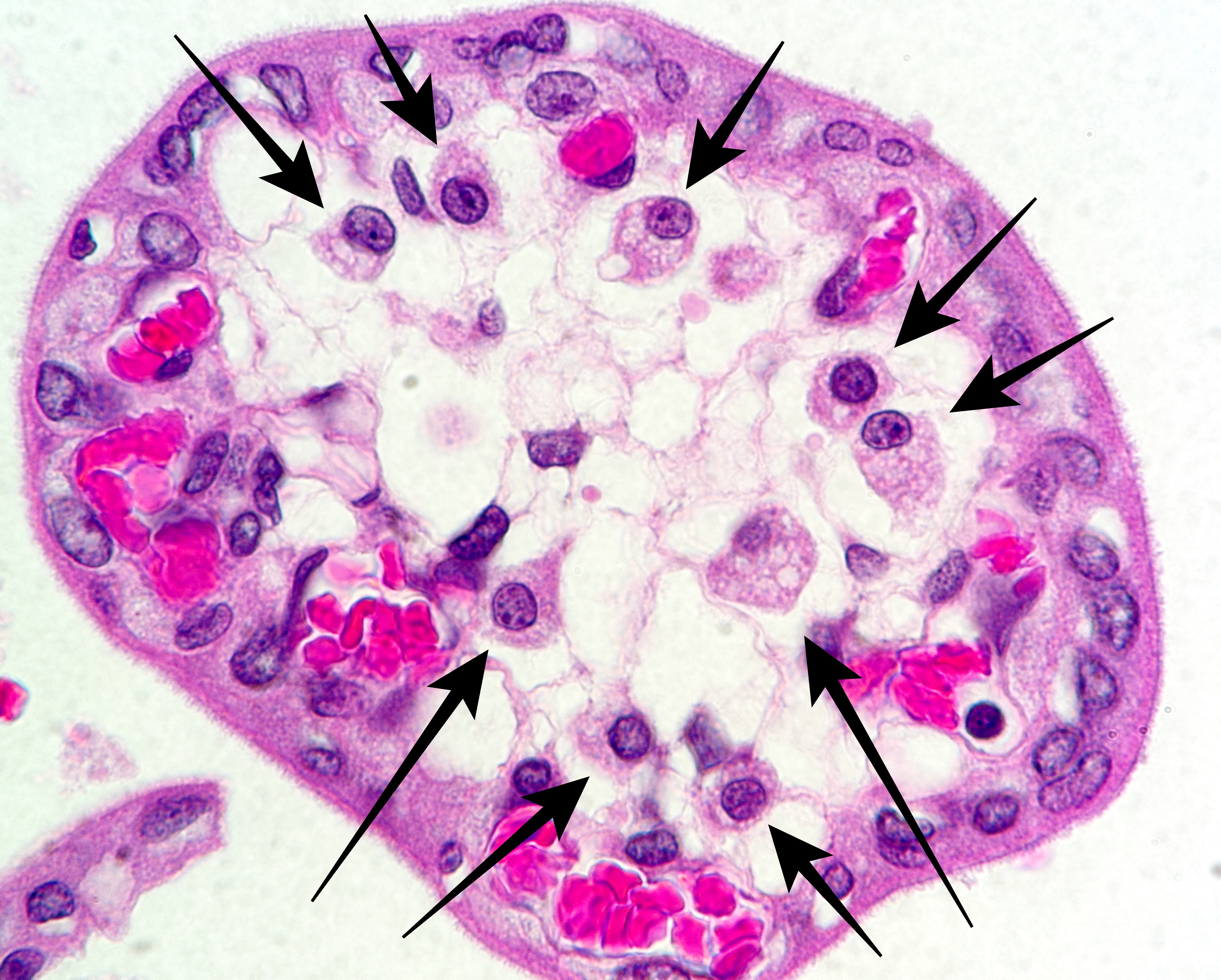
Chorionic villus with Hofbauer cells, annotated by black arrows. H&E stain

Hofbauer cells are oval eosinophilic histiocytes with granules and vacuoles found in the placenta, which are of mesenchymal origin, in mesoderm of the chorionic villi, particularly numerous in early pregnancy.

== Etymology ==
They are named after J. Isfred Isidore Hofbauer (1871-1961), a German-American gynecologist who described the cell type in his book Grundzüge einer Biologie der menschlichen Plazenta, mit besonderer Berücksichtigung der Fragen der fötalen Ernährung (Biology of the Human Placenta with a special emphasis on the question of fetal nourishment).

== Function ==
They are believed to be a type of macrophage and are most likely involved in preventing the transmission of pathogens from the mother to the fetus (vertical transmission). Although there are many studies concerning placental vasculogenesis and angiogenesis, there has been a lack of evidence on the possible roles of Hofbauer cells in these processes. According to a systems level single-cell transcriptomics based study of human placental cell-cell communication, Hofbauer cells produce HBE-GF, an EGFR ligand, which drives differentiation of villous cytotrophoblasts towards syncytiotrophoblasts.

== Histology ==
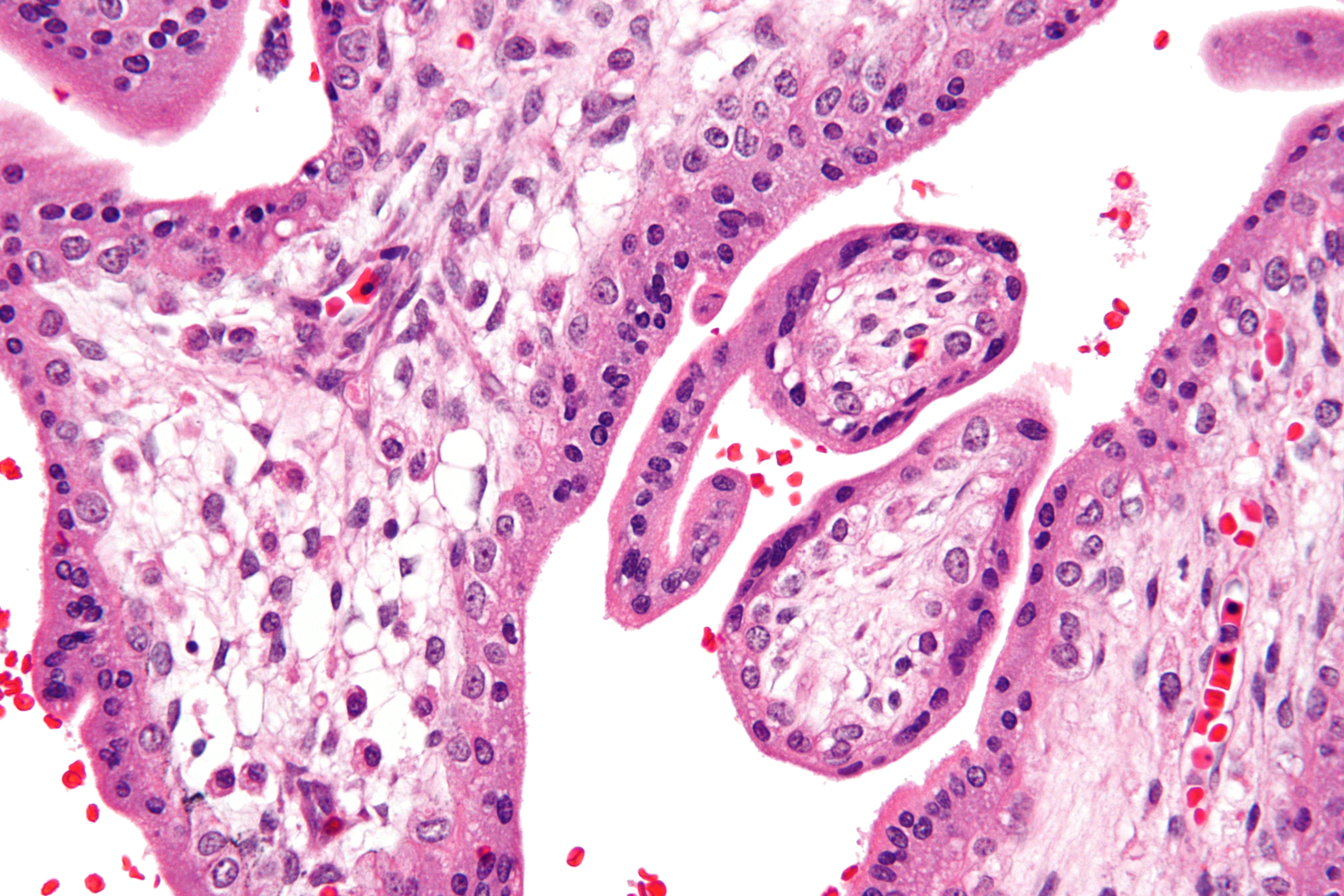
Micrograph of chorionic villi with Hofbauer cells. H&E stain.

Under histology sections, Hofbauer cells have appeared with discernible amount of cytoplasm.
