= Enrico Dioli =

Italian politician (1948–2025)

President of the Province of Sondrio
- In office 7 May 1995 – 27 June 1999
- Preceded by: Sergio Pasina
- Succeeded by: Eugenio Tarabini

Personal details
- Born: 2 February 1948 Sondrio, Italy
- Died: 13 April 2025 (aged 77) Calco, Italy
- Party: DL (2002–2007); PD (2007–2025)
- Occupation: Trade unionist

Enrico Dioli (2 February 1948 – 13 April 2025) was an Italian politician. A member of Democracy is Freedom – The Daisy and the Democratic Party, he served as president of the Province of Sondrio from 1995 to 1999.

Dioli died in Calco on 13 April 2025, at the age of 77.
