= Emanuele Antonelli =

Italian politician (born 1960)

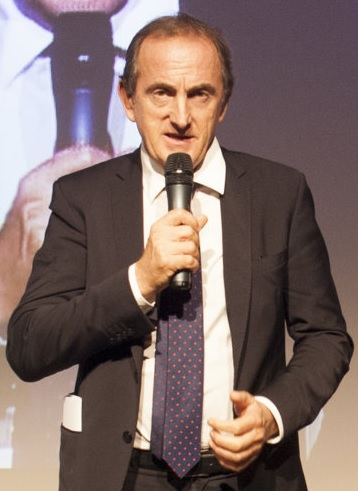
- Antonelli in 2019

President of the Province of Varese
- In office 31 October 2018 – 30 January 2023
- Preceded by: Nicola Gunnar Vincenzi
- Succeeded by: Marco Magrini

Mayor of Busto Arsizio
- Incumbent
- Assumed office 7 June 2016
- Preceded by: Gianluigi Farioli

Personal details
- Born: 9 January 1960 (age 66) Busto Arsizio, Province of Varese, Italy
- Party: The People of Freedom; Forza Italia; Brothers of Italy
- Occupation: Accountant

Emanuele Antonelli (born 13 July 1960) is an Italian politician who served as president of the Province of Varese from 2018 to 2023. He has served as mayor of Busto Arsizio since 2016.

Antonelli was elected to the Provincial Council of Varese in 2008 with the People of Freedom. In the 2016 municipal elections, Antonelli was elected mayor of Busto Arsizio in the first round, supported by Forza Italia, Lega Nord, Brothers of Italy and several civic lists, receiving 50.7% of the vote. In October 2018, he was elected president of the Province of Varese as the centre-right candidate, defeating Stefano Bellaria of the centre-left coalition with 55.3% of the weighted votes. He was re-elected mayor of Busto Arsizio in 2021 within the Brothers of Italy list.
