= Giuseppe Simoni =

Giuseppe Simoni is an Italian biologist and scientist. He was born in Pavia, Italy in 1944, and obtained his degree in biology at the University of Milan, where he later became a professor of genetics and biology for thirteen years.

He is currently the scientific director of the Biocell Center - an international biotechnology company based in Milan, Italy and Medford, Boston area, MA - where he is conducting research on amniotic stem cells.

His studies on amniotic stem cells showed that they are pluripotent, and which can differentiate into various types of tissues and mature cells, which avoids many of the ethical problems arising from the use of stem cells in research.
