= Gino Zappa =

Italian economist

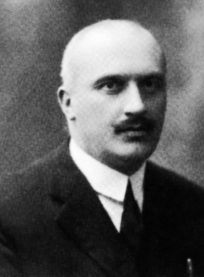
- Born: 1879; Milan
- Died: 1960 (aged 80–81); Venice
- Known for: Italian Corporate economics
- Scientific career
- Fields: Economist
- Workplaces: Bocconi University, Milan; University Ca'Foscari, Venice

Gino Zappa (Milan, 1879 – Venice, 1960) was an Italian economist and one of the most important figures in the fields of economics and accounting in the twentieth century.

== Biography ==
He was a professor at Bocconi University in Milan and University Ca'Foscari of Venice, where he was also Rector. Zappa dedicated his life to the study of business economics. Pietro Onida, Pasquale Saraceno, Tommaso Zerbi, Giordano Dell'Amore, Ugo Caprara, Aldo Amaduzzi, Giorgio Pivato, Ettore Lorusso, Carlo Masini, Lino Azzini, Luigi Guatri, Arnaldo Marcantonio and others would later expand his ideas.

== Business Economics: the unity of the disciplines detection, management, organization ==
"The science that studies the conditions of existence and manifestations of corporate life, the science of economic administration companies, in other words, business administration is our science."

From G. Zappa New Trends in the Studies of Accounting (1927). The lines of the renewal of economics and business studies are drawn from him in this historic inaugural address, delivered in 1926, on the occasion of the inauguration of the academic year at the university Ca 'Foscari of Venice, and published the following year, in 1927. This speech marks the official start of the modern teaching of business economics (“economia aziendale”) in Italian universities.

With this work, Zappa proposed the following challenge: to create a "unified science” of "vast content" "to compose a whole, generally ordered for principles, the study of economics by company in its multiple and complex manifestations" (Zappa 1956, p. 3). G. Zappa proposed a more integrated approach in Italy: scholars of public accounting, management and organization are called to broaden their horizons and to work on complementary research. More specifically Zappa proposed to unify accounting, business legal forms, Corporate governance, organizational studies and business economic analysis (see Investment analysis) in one coherent and unified subject. This vision can be opposed to dominant view of economic profession at the time (see microeconomics) which tended to see business as “black-boxes” not worrying in describing its internal modes of operation.

Modern Italian universities usually offer both courses of business economics as above defined as well standard course in microeconomics to their undergraduate students.

== See also ==
- Bocconi University
- Italian Business Economics
