= Rhaetian Populars =

Rhaetian Populars Popolari Retici
- Leader: Mauro Bianchini
- Founded: 1997
- Headquarters: Via Nazario Sauro n. 29, Sondrio
- Ideology: Christian democracy Autonomism
- Political position: centre-right
- National affiliation: Centre-right coalition

Website
- www.popolariretici.it

Rhaetian Populars (Italian: Popolari Retici) is a political party in Italy based in Sondrio. The founder of the party was Eugenio Tarabini, who was its leader until his death (in 2018).

== History ==
The party was founded around in 1997 by Eugenio Tarabini (former Undersecretary and MP) and Paolo Arrigoni (former president of the Lombardy Region). The party was founded with the aim of obtaining the Valtellina autonomy and regularly appears in the Sondrio administrative elections.

In 1999 the leader and founder of the party, Eugenio Tarabini, was elected President of the Province of Sondrio with the support of the Pole of Freedoms. In 2004 Tarabini lost re-election against Fiorello Provera, candidate of the Northern League.

In 2003 Bianca Bianchini, member of the Rhaetian Populars, was elected Mayor of Sondrio.

After the death of Eugenio Tarabini in 2018, Mauro Bianchini took over the leadership of the party.
