= Biocell Center =

Biocell Center is an international company specializing in the cryopreservation and private banking of amniotic fluid stem cells. The company is headquartered in Italy with several international locations and is involved with numerous partnerships and research studies of amniotic fluid stem cells.

In 2008, Biocell Center opened the first amniotic fluid stem cell bank in the world, and in 2009 it opened the first amniotic fluid stem cell bank in the United States for private storage of stem cells obtained during genetic amniocentesis.

Biocell Center’s Italian headquarters in Busto Arsizio and Milan (Italy), are managed by company president Marco Reguzzoni and scientific director Giuseppe Simoni, and additional subsidiaries are located in Lugano (Switzerland), and Natick, Massachusetts (USA) - Boston area.

Biocell Center is currently collaborating with Harvard University and the Caritas Christi Health Care hospital network on amniotic stem cell research.
