= Marco Magrini =

Italian politician (born 1960)

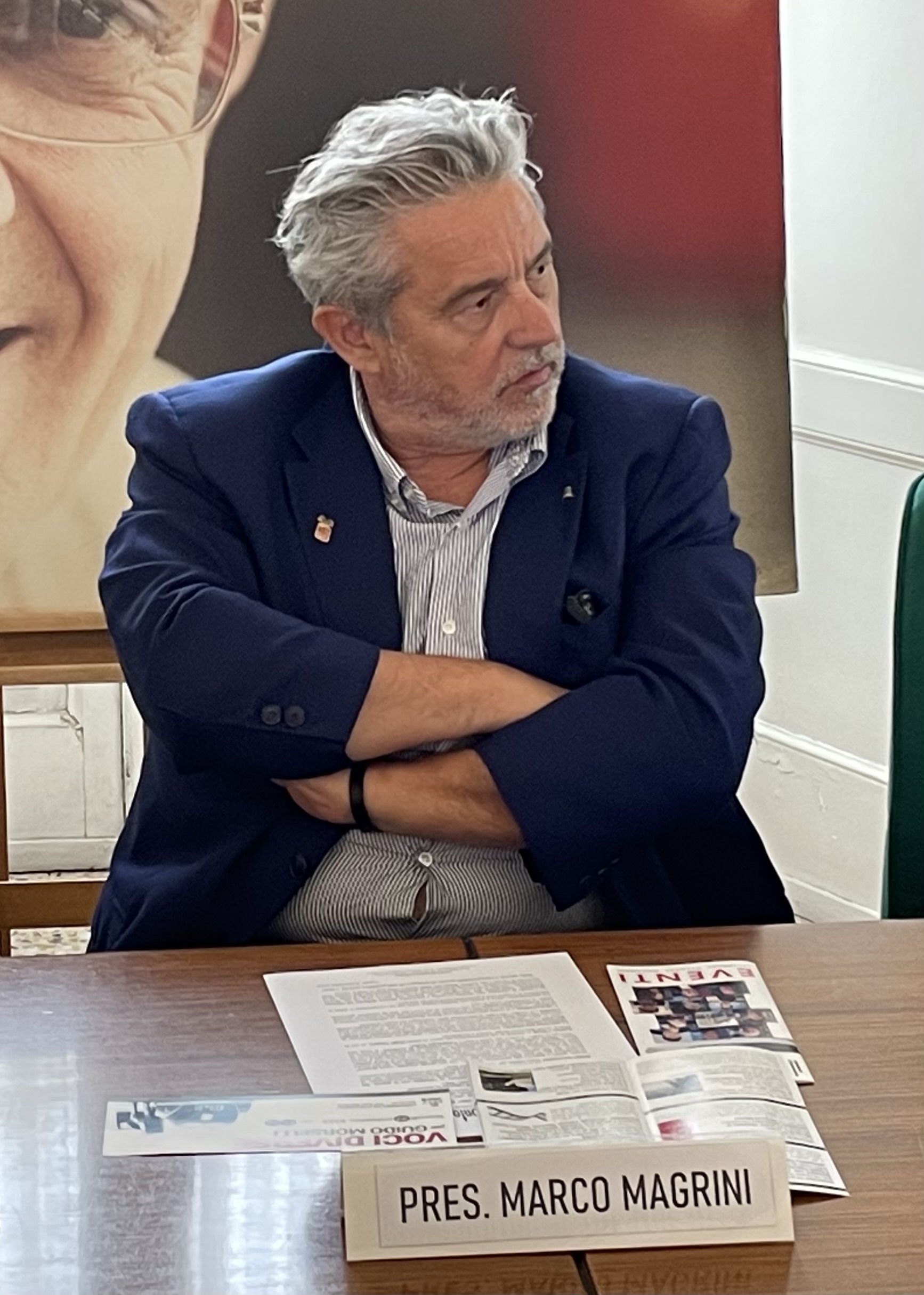
- Magrini in 2023

President of the Province of Varese
- Incumbent
- Assumed office 30 January 2023
- Preceded by: Emanuele Antonelli

Mayor of Masciago Primo
- Incumbent
- Assumed office 22 September 2020

Mayor of Cassano Valcuvia
- In office 14 June 2004 – 27 May 2019

Personal details
- Born: 13 July 1960 (age 66) Cassano Valcuvia, Province of Varese, Italy

Marco Magrini (born 13 July 1960) is an Italian politician serving as president of the Province of Varese since 2023. He has served as mayor of Masciago Primo since 2020.

== Career ==
Magrini entered politics in 1985 as a civic independent and was elected to the municipal council of Cassano Valcuvia, where he also served as an assessor before being elected mayor in 2004. He was re-elected for three consecutive terms, serving until 2019.

In 2014, he entered the Provincial Council of Varese and was vice president from November 2016 to October 2018. In 2020, he was elected mayor of Masciago Primo, and reconfirmed in 2026.

In January 2023, Magrini was elected president of the Province of Varese as a civic candidate supported by the Democratic Party and other civic groups, defeating incumbent Emanuele Antonelli, the centre-right candidate, with 53.67% of the weighted vote.
