= Vincenzo La Russa =

Italian politician (1938–2021)

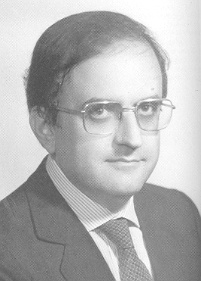
- La Russa in 1983

Member of the Chamber of Deputies of Italy
- In office 12 July 1983 – 1 July 1987
- Constituency: Milan-Pavia

Member of the Senate of the Republic of Italy
- In office 20 June 1979 – 11 July 1983
- Constituency: Lombardy
- In office 15 April 1994 – 8 May 1996
- Constituency: Sicily

Personal details
- Born: 10 July 1938 Paternò, Kingdom of Italy
- Died: 21 November 2021 (aged 83) Milan, Italy
- Party: DC (until (1994); CCD (1994–2002)

Vincenzo La Russa (10 July 1938 – 21 November 2021) was an Italian politician. A member of the Christian Democracy party and the Christian Democratic Centre, he served in the Senate of the Republic from 1979 to 1983 and again from 1994 to 1996 as well as the Chamber of Deputies from 1983 to 1987.

== Biography ==
Born in Paternò (CT), he was the eldest son of Antonino La Russa—political secretary of the National Fascist Party in Paternò during the 1940s and, after the war, a member of the Chamber of Deputies and the Senate for the Italian Social Movement—and Maria Concetta Oliveri, who came from a wealthy family in Paternò.His younger brothers were Ignazio La Russa and Romano Maria La Russa, both active in politics. After graduating from the classical high school in Paternò in 1957, he moved to Milan shortly thereafter with his family.In the Lombard capital, he attended the Università Cattolica del Sacro Cuore, where he earned a law degree with a thesis on constitutional law.He began a career as a civil and administrative lawyer; he was registered with the journalists’ association (as a freelance writer) and the association of certified public accountants.

Married and the father of two children, he died in Milan in 2021 at the age of 83.
