= Noè Pajetta =

Italian politician and partisan (1889–1966)

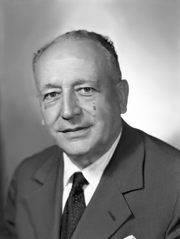

Member of the Senate of the Republic
- In office 12 June 1958 – 1 January 1966
- Succeeded by: Pietro Ferreri

President of the Province of Varese
- In office 4 September 1952 – 26 June 1956
- Preceded by: Guido Sironi
- Succeeded by: Aristide Marchetti

Personal details
- Born: 6 January 1889 Angera, Kingdom of Italy
- Died: 1 January 1966 (aged 76) Varese, Italy
- Party: Christian Democracy
- Profession: Lawyer

Noè Pajetta (6 January 1889 – 1 January 1966) was an Italian lawyer, partisan and politician. A member of Christian Democracy, he served as a member of the Senate during the 3rd and 4th Legislature of Italy.
