= Luigi Grassi =

Italian footballer

Personal information
- Full name: Luigi Grassi
- Date of birth: 21 October 1983 (age 43)
- Place of birth: Camporgiano, Italy
- Height: 1.72 m (5 ft 8 in)
- Position: Forward

Senior career*
Years	Team	Apps	(Gls)
2000–2007	Castelnuovo Garfagnana	122	(17)
2007–2010	San Marino	93	(27)
2010–2011	Lucchese	31	(9)
2011–2012	Borgo a Buggiano	26	(13)
2012–2013	Pontedera	33	(22)
2013–2014	Salernitana	0	(0)
2013–2014	→ Pontedera (loan)	27	(15)
2014–2015	Pontedera	19	(8)
2015	Ascoli	29	(3)
2016–2017	SPAL	13	(2)
2017–2018	Pontedera	29	(5)
- * Club domestic league appearances and goals as of 11 May 2018

Luigi Grassi (born 21 October 1983) is an Italian footballer. He plays as a striker.
