= Claudio Donelli =

Italian politician (1928–2022)

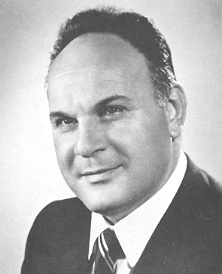
- Donelli in 1972

Member of the Senate of the Republic of Italy
- In office 5 July 1976 – 19 June 1979

Member of the Chamber of Deputies of Italy
- In office 15 May 1972 – 4 July 1976
- Constituency: Como

Personal details
- Born: 24 April 1928 Cusano Milanino, Italy
- Died: 25 December 2022 (aged 94) Varese, Italy
- Party: PCI

Claudio Donelli (24 April 1928 – 25 December 2022) was an Italian politician. A member of the Italian Communist Party, he served in the Chamber of Deputies from 1972 to 1976 and the Senate of the Republic from 1976 to 1979.

Donelli died in Varese on 25 December 2022, at the age of 94.
