= Attilio Spozio =

Italian politician (1927–1980)

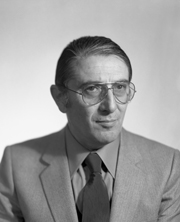

Member of the Senate of the Republic
- In office 20 June 1979 – 29 January 1980
- Succeeded by: Margherita Boniver

President of the Province of Varese
- In office 28 September 1975 – 10 April 1979
- Preceded by: Fausto Franchi
- Succeeded by: Giovanni Marchesi

Personal details
- Born: 3 February 1927 Preglia, Crevoladossola, Province of Varese, Kingdom of Italy
- Died: 29 January 1980 (aged 52) Varese, Lombardy, Italy
- Party: Italian Socialist Party
- Occupation: Lawyer

Attilio Spozio (3 February 1927 – 29 January 1980) was an Italian lawyer and politician. A member of the Italian Socialist Party, he served as a member of the Senate of the Republic during the 8th Legislature and was president of the Province of Varese from 1975 to 1979.
