= Massimo Sertori =

Italian politician (born 1968)

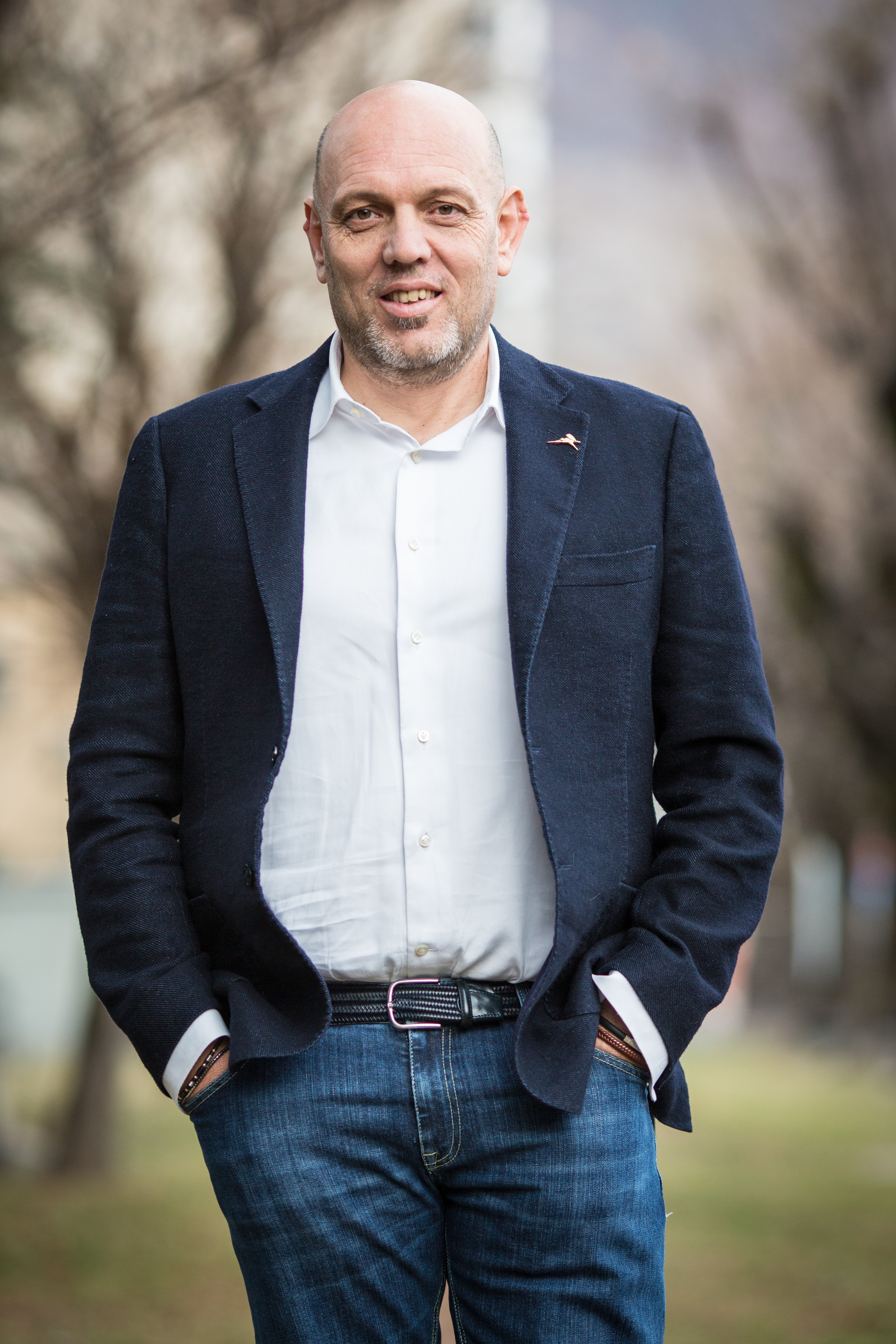

Regional assessor for Local authorities and Energy resources of Lombardy
- Incumbent
- Assumed office 5 April 2018
- President: Attilio Fontana

President of the Province of Sondrio
- In office 11 June 2009 – 29 September 2014
- Preceded by: Fiorello Provera
- Succeeded by: Luca Della Bitta

Personal details
- Born: 11 March 1968 (age 58) Sondrio, Italy
- Party: Lega Nord
- Occupation: Entrepreneur

Massimo Sertori (born 11 March 1968) is an Italian politician and entrepreneur of the Lega Nord who has served as regional assessor for Local authorities and Energy resources of Lombardy since 2018. He previously served as president of the Province of Sondrio from 2009 to 2014, provincial assessor and deputy mayor of Ponte in Valtellina.
