= Giordano Dell'Amore =

Italian politician

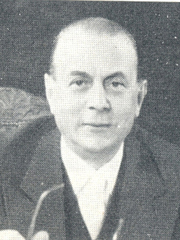
Giordano Dell'Amore

Giordano Dell'Amore (30 November 1902 in Cairo – 6 January 1981 in Milan) was an Italian economist and banker.

== Biography ==
Dell'Amore was born in Cairo of Italian parents. Returned to his homeland while still boy and completed his studies in Milan at the Bocconi University, Faculty of Business Administration and Economics. While a student he was deeply influenced by the guide of Gaetano Mosca and Gino Zappa, but only the latter actually became his mentor in the academic and research career in the early thirties. In the early fifties he met and developed friendship and cooperation with Costantino Bresciani Turroni and Amintore Fanfani. He had also relations of friendly competitive collaboration with Raffaele Mattioli, chairman of Banca Commerciale Italiana, and Enrico Cuccia, chairman of Mediobanca. In these years he became distinguished Professor of Banking at his alma mater, where, later, served also as rector. Among his students may be mentioned several prominent Italian bankers and economists as Mario Monti, Mario Arcelli, Tommaso Padoa Schioppa, Fiorella Kostoris, Giovanni Arrighi, Roberto Mazzotta and Fabrizio Saccomanni. A number of pupils shared his scientific views and became professors in leading Italian universities: among them Francesco Arcucci, Alberto Arienti, Alberto Bertoni, Tancredi Bianchi, Sergio Bortolani, Claudio Demattè, Arnaldo Mauri, Paolo Mottura, Marco Onado, Antonio Pin, Antonio Porteri, and Roberto Ruozi. In 1952 Dell'Amore was appointed Chairman of the board of directors of one of the main Italian banks, Cassa di Risparmio delle Provincie Lombarde and later also elected President of the Associazione fra le Casse di Risparmio Italiane as well as in 1969 President of the International Savings Banks Institute (ISBI) in Geneva, now World Savings Banks Institute in Brussels. As president of ISBI he met the British prime minister Edward Heath at the X World Savings Banks Congress held in London in 1972. Under the guide of Dell'Amore the Lombardy's Savings Bank was shaken out its traditional conservative mould to become transformed in the space of two decades into a dynamic modern financial institution. During that period, its deposits climbed 18 times in real terms while its branch network doubled and its employees tripled in number. In 1970 he met in Milan Haile Selassie and the Ethiopian Minister of Finance Mammo Tadesse to discuss programs on technical assistance to Ethiopia in the field of household savings mobilisation.

In 1973, he established in Milan Finafrica Foundation with the aim to help the improvement of African financial systems by means of training, providing technical assistance and research. Dell'Amore had also relevant roles in politics: Governor of the Province of Milan, Senator of the Republic of Italy in 1963 and previously, in 1954, Minister of foreign trade in the government led by Amintore Fanfani. His funeral was celebrated in Milan by the cardinal Giovanni Colombo. In February 2006 a square in the centre of Milan (nearby la Scala Opera House) has been named after Giordano Dell'Amore.
