= Claudio Demattè =

Italian economist

Claudio Demattè (4 March 1942 – 19 March 2004) was an Italian economist and founder of SDA Bocconi. He was also president of RAI and chairman of Ferrovie dello Stato.

== Biography ==
Claudio Demattè was born in Trento on 4 March 1942. He graduated in economics from Bocconi University under the guide of Giordano Dell'Amore in 1966 and earned his M.B.A. from Harvard Business School in 1970. He spent most of his career at Bocconi University and focused on strategic management, internationalization strategy, finance and the television industry. In 1971 he founded SDA Bocconi and was its Director from 1984 to 1989 and then Chairman from 1996 to 2002. In 1988 he founded the journal Economia & Management (Etas). As a professor and researcher he focused mainly on the following subjects: corporate strategy, internationalization strategy, banking and financial markets, financial services businesses, media & TV. He took also direct management responsibilities in top utilities and banking institutions.

He was president of RAI in 1994, he decided to resign with the entire Board short after Berlusconi's electoral victory, he was chairman of Ferrovie dello Stato from 1998 to 2001, and chairman of the bank CARIME from 1996 to 2000 and before that chairman of Banca di Trento e Bolzano in his home town of Trento. In all these positions he brought competence, innovation, pragmatism and undisputed granitic integrity.

He died at the age of 62 in Milan on 19 March 2004.

== Some of his articles and books ==
The articles he wrote for "Economia & Management" have been collected in the book "Il mestiere di dirigere" (Etas 2004). Some of them can be read here:

- IMPRENDITORI E MANAGER: SI NASCE O SI DIVENTA?
- LA TRIPLICE LEVA VINCENTE: RIDUZIONE DEI COSTI, INNOVAZIONE ED ESPANSIONE INTERNAZIONALE
- PERCHE' BISOGNA BATTERSI PER DIFENDERE E AMPLIARE IL RUOLO DEI MERCATI
- PER ALCUNE IMPRESE ITALIANE E' URGENTE UNA STRATEGIA PANEUROPEA
- IL MESTIERE DI DIRIGERE
- La valutazione delle capacità di credito nelle analisi di fido, Vallardi, Milano
- I mercati finanziari internazionali (con P. De Sury) (a cura di), Egea, Milano, 1992
- Economia degli Intermediari Finanziari (con G.Forestieri, P.Mottura) (a cura di), Egea, Milano, 1993
- Una cultura per l'impresa, Etas, Milano, 1996
- Strategia d'impresa (di G. Saloner, A. Shepard, J. Podolny) (curatela dell'edizione italiana con F. Perretti), Etas, Milano, 2002
- L'impresa televisiva. Principi economici e variabili strategiche (con Fabrizio Perretti), Etas, Milano, 2002 (seconda edizione)

== Other articles ==
- Addio a Demattè il bocconiano doc che guidò le Fs e la Rai dei «professori»
- Il ricordo di un grande manager: Claudio Demattè
- Addio a Claudio Demattè guidò la Rai e le Ferrovie
- Dematté, una borsa per innovare
- Claudio Demattè: «Meno azioni ma a tutti»
- L' addio al bocconiano Demattè Formò generazioni di manager
