= Alessandro Borghi =

Alessandro Borghi may refer to:

- Alessandro Borghi (actor) (born 1986), Italian actor
- Alessandro Borghi (bishop) (1559–1613), Italian Roman Catholic bishop
