= Dario Galli =

Italian politician (born 1957)

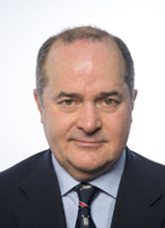
- Galli in 2018

Deputy Minister of Economic Development
- In office 13 June 2018 – 5 September 2019
- Prime Minister: Giuseppe Conte
- Minister: Luigi Di Maio
- Preceded by: Teresa Bellanova; Carlo Calenda
- Succeeded by: Stefano Buffagni

Mayor of Tradate
- In office 25 June 2017 – 16 November 2018
- Preceded by: Laura Fiorina Cavalotti
- Succeeded by: Giuseppe Bascialla
- In office 22 November 1993 – 28 May 2002
- Preceded by: Ferdinando Lucioni
- Succeeded by: Stefano Candiani

President of the Province of Varese
- In office 15 April 2008 – 22 April 2013
- Preceded by: Marco Reguzzoni
- Succeeded by: Nicola Gunnar Vincenzi

Member of the Chamber of Deputies
- In office 23 March 2018 – 12 October 2022
- In office 4 June 1997 – 27 April 2006

Member of the Senate of the Republic
- In office 28 April 2006 – 28 April 2008

Personal details
- Born: 25 June 1957 (age 69) Tradate, Province of Varese, Italy
- Party: Lega Nord; Lega
- Education: Polytechnic University of Milan
- Occupation: Business executive

Dario Galli (born 25 June 1957) is an Italian politician of Lega Nord who served as a member of the Chamber of Deputies and deputy minister of Economic development in the first Conte government. He also served as president of the Province of Varese and mayor of Tradate.
