= Aristide Marchetti =

Italian politician and partisan (1920–1994)

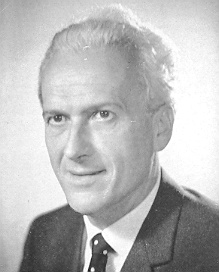

Member of the Senate of the Republic
- In office 5 July 1976 – 11 July 1983

Member of the Chamber of Deputies
- In office 21 June 1968 – 4 July 1976

President of the Province of Varese
- In office 26 June 1956 – 4 August 1962
- Preceded by: Noè Pajetta
- Succeeded by: Fausto Franchi

Personal details
- Born: 2 June 1920 Laveno, Kingdom of Italy
- Died: 9 December 1994 (aged 74) Rome, Italy
- Party: Christian Democracy
- Occupation: Business executive

Aristide Marchetti (2 June 1920 – 9 December 1994) was an Italian partisan, anti-fascist and politician. A member of Christian Democracy, he served as a member of the Chamber of Deputies during the 5th and 6th Legislature, and later as a member of the Senate.
