= Fiorello Provera =

Italian politician (born 1946)

- Provera in 2013

Member of the European Parliament
- In office 14 July 2009 – 30 June 2014
- Parliamentary group: Europe of Freedom and Democracy
- Constituency: North-West Italy

President of the Province of Sondrio
- In office 28 June 2004 – 11 June 2009
- Preceded by: Eugenio Tarabini
- Succeeded by: Massimo Sertori

Member of the Senate of the Republic
- In office 9 May 1996 – 27 April 2006

Member of the Chamber of Deputies
- In office 23 April 1992 – 8 May 1996

Personal details
- Born: 31 March 1946 (age 80) Vigevano, Province of Pavia, Italy
- Party: Lega Nord
- Education: University of Pavia
- Occupation: Paediatrician

Fiorello Provera (born 31 March 1946) is an Italian physician and politician of the Lega Nord party. He served as a deputy, senator, president of the Province of Sondrio from 2004 to 2009 and member of the European Parliament from 2009 to 2014.
