= Luigi Borghi =

Italian violinist and composer

Luigi Borghi (fl. 1772 – 1794) was an Italian violinist and composer, living in London, particularly involved with orchestras of opera houses.

== Life ==
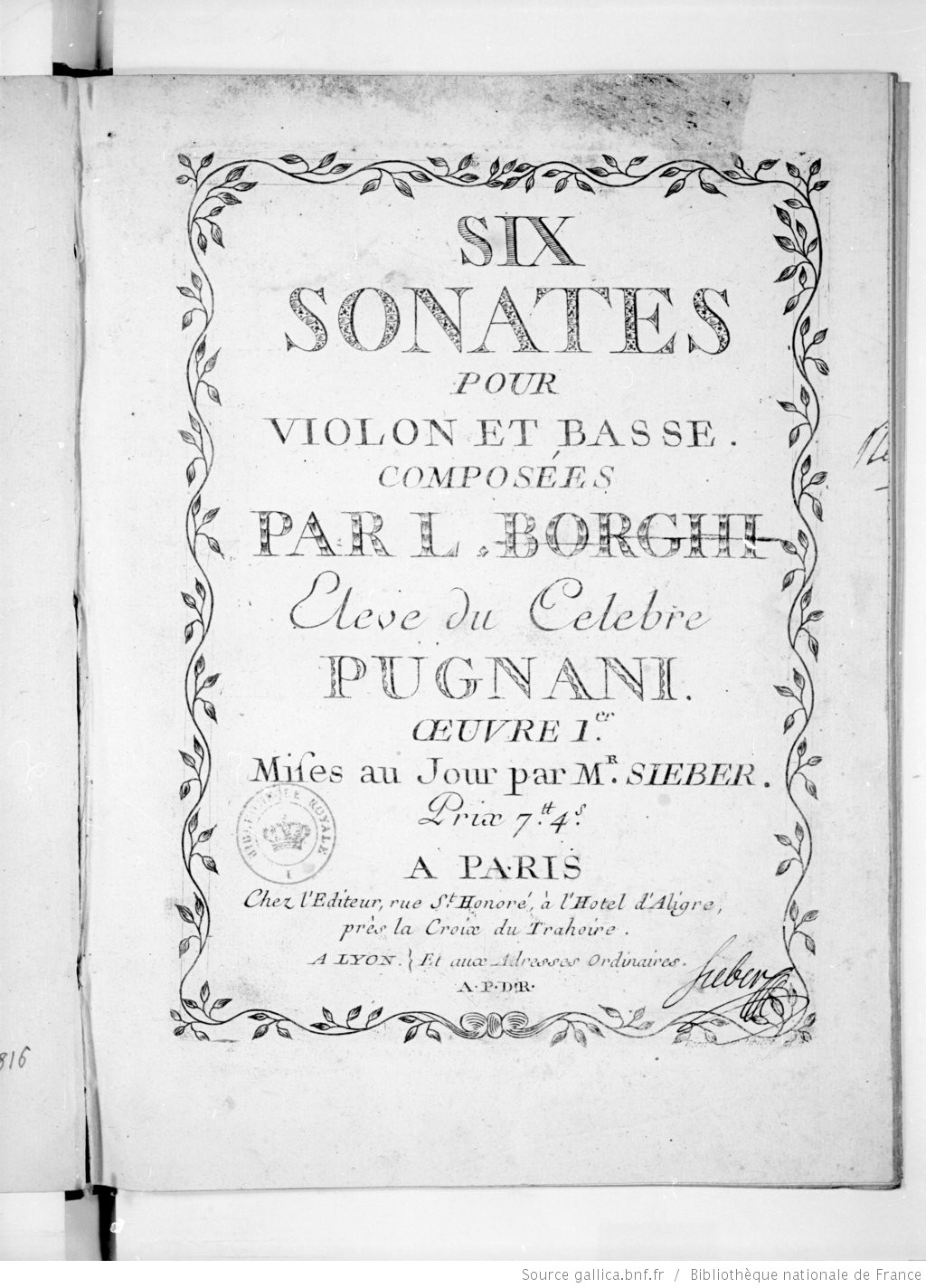
Title page of Luigi Borghi's Opus 1.

Borghi was a pupil of Gaetano Pugnani. From the 1770s he lived in London, where he appeared as a violinist and a violist. He played in the orchestra of the King's Theatre from 1783 to 1785, and was leader of the second violins in the Handel Commemoration at Westminster Abbey in 1784. On 2 July 1785 he was admitted to the Royal Society of Musicians.

He was second violin in a string quartet in Wilhelm Cramer's "Professional Concerts", subscription concerts set up in 1785. He is thought to have been in Berlin in 1788; however in 1790 he was in the orchestra of the London Opera company, led by Wilhelm Cramer, which was in the Haymarket Theatre after a fire at the King's Theatre in 1789.

For the 1791 season at the Pantheon, London Borghi was appointed acting manager of the opera company, and was responsible for 55 nights of operas and ballets from February to July.

He married Anna Casentini, a soprano in the Pantheon company at that time. In 1794 they were living in Hanover Square, Westminster.

== Compositions ==
These include:

- Six Solos for a Violin and Bass, 1772
- Six Sonates à deux violins, about 1780
- The Celebrated Opera Dances, as perform'd at the King's Theatre with others, in 1783, published in four parts by W. Forster
- 6 Duos for violin and viola (or cello), Op. 5 (about 1786); published 1791 in Berlin as Op. 6
- Sixty-four Cadences or Solos for the Violin, about 1790
