= Marco Reguzzoni =

Italian politician (born 1971)

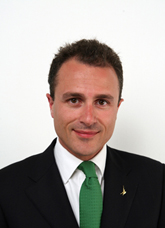

President of the Province of Varese
- In office 26 May 2002 – 12 February 2008
- Preceded by: Massimo Ferrario
- Succeeded by: Dario Galli

Member of the Chamber of Deputies
- In office 29 April 2008 – 14 March 2013

Personal details
- Born: 30 May 1971 (age 55) Busto Arsizio, Italy
- Party: Northern League (1986–2017); Great North (2017–2024); Forza Italia (since 2024)
- Spouse: Elena Speroni
- Children: 2 (Carolina and Beatrice)
- Education: Polytechnic University of Milan
- Profession: Politician, entrepreneur

Marco Giovanni Reguzzoni (born 30 May 1971) is an Italian politician and entrepreneur. He served as President of the Varese Province from 2002 to 2008, and as Group Leader of the Lega Nord party in the Italian Chamber of Deputies from 2010 to 2012, when he resigned from all political office. In 2010 he founded Volandia, an aeronautical museum. He has been a member of the Forza Italia party since 2024.

== Biography ==
Reguzzoni was born in Busto Arsizio. After obtaining a Bachelor in Economical Science and Engineering, he served as councilman in the city of Busto Arsizio from 1993 to 1997 and provincial councilman from 1993 to 2008.

In 2002, he was elected President of the Province of Varese, becoming the youngest president ever elected in a province in Italy up to that point. In 2007, he was re-elected President with around 70% of preferences, and was appointed National Vice-secretary of the Lombard League.

In 2005, he participated at International Leadership Program, a US government sponsored program reserved to emerging leaders. He is honorary citizen of Louisville, Kentucky and a member of Amerigo Italian Chapter.

In 2008, he was elected to the Chamber of Deputies and became the parliamentary chairman of the Northern League. He resigned as chairman in 2012, succeeded by Gianpaolo Dozzo.

In 2015, Reguzzoni joined the "I Repubblicani" association.

He serves as Chairman of Biocell Center, an international company specializing in cryopreservation and banking of amniotic fluid and placental stem cells.

== Books ==
- De Agostini "Varese Provincia d'Autore", photograph book with imagines of Varese province.
- Mondadori printing - Il Giornale "Expo 2015, un'opportunità per tutti". More than 10.000 copies sold.
- Macchione Editore "Marketing of Landing". University of Varese courses .
- Rizzoli "Vento del Nord", 2011.

== Papers review ==
- School of federalism
- Road cycling championship
- Reguzzoni asked to reduce the ban of Ivan Basso
- BBC news msnbc news
- Other articles en English
- wikioScheda personale - Camera dei Deputati
- Biocell Center
- Biocell Center
