= Eugenio Tarabini =

Italian politician (1930–2018)

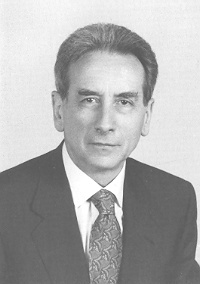

President of the Province of Sondrio
- In office 27 June 1999 – 27 June 2004
- Preceded by: Enrico Dioli
- Succeeded by: Fiorello Provera

Member of the Chamber of Deputies
- In office 5 June 1968 – 4 July 1976
- In office 2 July 1987 – 14 April 1994

Member of the Senate of the Republic
- In office 5 July 1976 – 1 July 1987

Personal details
- Born: 2 May 1930 Morbegno, Italy
- Died: 25 August 2018 (aged 88) Sondrio, Italy
- Party: Christian Democracy; Rhaetian Populars
- Education: Università Cattolica del Sacro Cuore
- Profession: Politician, lawyer

Eugenio Tarabini (2 May 1930 – 25 August 2018) was an Italian politician.

Tarabini was born in Morbegno on 2 May 1930. He married Lucia, with whom he had three children, and was a lawyer. A member of Christian Democracy, he sat on the Italian Parliament from 1968 to 1994, alternating his mandates in the Chamber of Deputies with those in the Senate.

He served as Undersecretary for Treasury seven times between 1978 and 1992.

In the 90s he founded the Rhaetian Populars, of which he was a leader until his death. He was elected president of the province of Sondrio in 1999 with the support of the Pole for Freedoms. Tarabini lost re-election in 2004 against Fiorello Provera, candidate of the Northern League. He died in Sondrio on 25 August 2018, aged 88.
