= Politics of Lombardy =

Political system of Lombardy, Italy

The politics of Lombardy, a region of Italy, takes place in the framework of an "anomalous presidential" representative democracy or prime-ministerial system with an executive presidency, whereby the President of the Region is the head of government, and of a pluriform multi-party system. Legislative power is vested in the Regional Council of Lombardy, while executive power is exercised by the Regional Government led by the President, who is directly elected by the people. The current Statute, which regulates the functioning of the regional institutions, has been in force since 2008.

Prior to the rise of Fascism, most of the deputies elected in Lombardy were part of the liberal establishment (see Historical Right, Historical Left and Liberals), which governed Italy for decades. Lombardy was also the birthplace of the Italian Workers' Party, forerunner of the Italian Socialist Party (PSI), and its eastern and northern provinces were an early stronghold of the Italian People's Party. In the 1924 general election, which led Italy to dictatorship, Lombardy was one of the few regions, along with Veneto and Piedmont, which did not return an absolute majority to the National Fascist Party. After World War II Lombardy became a stronghold of the Christian Democracy, since the 1980s in association with the PSI, which was especially strong in Milan.

Traditionally, Lombardy gives centrist results in elections, reflecting its strong middle class. The Communists and their successors – the Democratic Party of the Left, the Democrats of the Left and the present-day Democratic Party – never prevailed. In the 1980s Lombardy saw the organisation of a new regionalist party, the Lombard League (LL), then merged into the Northern League (LN) in the 1990s.

Lombardy is now a stronghold of the "centre-right coalition" composed of the LN and the liberal conservative Forza Italia (FI), founded by Lombard entrepreneur Silvio Berlusconi. The coalition, which was joined by the LN in 2000, has governed the region since 1995, under three Presidents, Roberto Formigoni (CDU/FI/PdL), Roberto Maroni (LN) and Attilio Fontana (LN).

On 22 October 2017 an autonomy referendum took place in Lombardy: 38.3% of Lombards participated and 95.3% voted "yes".

== Executive branch ==
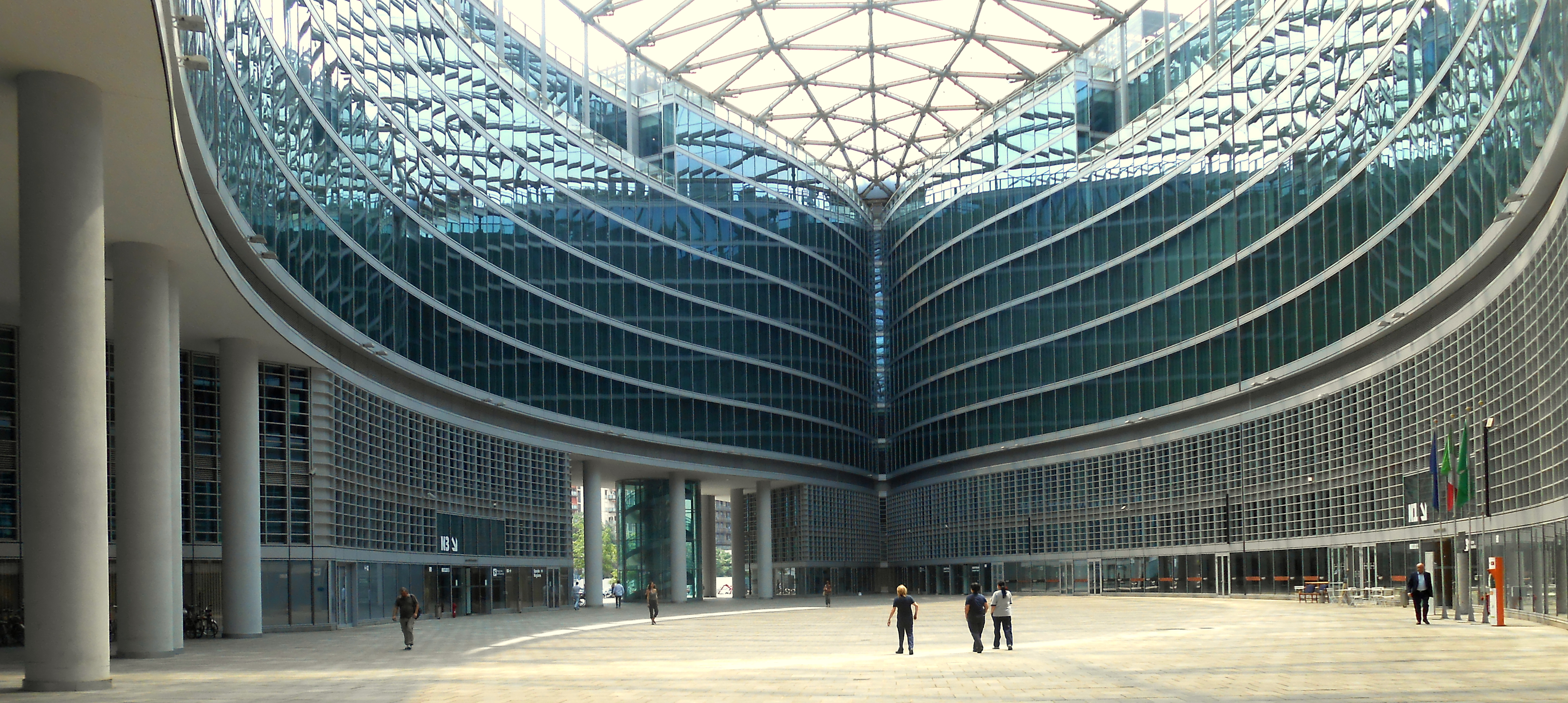
Palazzo Lombardia in Milan is the seat of the Regional Government

The Regional Cabinet (Giunta Regionale) is presided by the President of the Region (Presidente della Regione), who is elected for a five-year term, and is currently composed by 17 members: the President and 16 regional Assessors, including a Vice President (Vice Presidente), while 4 under-secretaries (Sottosegretari) help the President but have no voting rights in the cabinet meetings.

=== Current composition ===
Attilio Fontana was officially sworn in for a second term as President on 1 March 2023. Current executive was officially sworn in on 10 March 2023.

| Party | | Members |
|---|---|---|
| Lega | Lega | President and 5 assessors |
| Brothers of Italy | FdI | Vice President and 6 assessors |
| Forza Italia | FI | 2 assessors |
| Ideal Lombardy | LI | 2 assessors |

| Assessor | Party | Delegate for |
|---|---|---|
| Marco Alparone (vice president) | FdI | Finance and budget |
| Guido Bertolaso | LI | Healthcare and welfare |
| Giorgio Maione | LI | Environment and climate |
| Claudia Terzi | Lega | Public infrastructures |
| Franco Lucente | FdI | Public transports and sustainable mobility |
| Romano La Russa | FdI | Public security and Civil Protection |
| Simona Tironi | FI | Education and labour |
| Alessandro Fermi | Lega | University and research |
| Guido Guidesi | Lega | Economic development |
| Elena Lucchini | Lega | Family, social policies, disability and equal opportunities |
| Paolo Franco | FdI | Social housing |
| Barbara Mazzali | FdI | Tourism, marketing and fashion |
| Massimo Sartori | Lega | Local authorities and mountains |
| Francesca Caruso | FdI | Cultural heritage |
| Alessandro Beduschi | FdI | Agriculture, food policies and food sovereignty |
| Gianluca Comazzi | FI | Regional parks and territory |

=== List of presidents ===
The current President of Lombardy is Attilio Fontana, who is serving his second term after winning the 2023 regional election.

| President | | Term of office | | Party | Administration | Coalition | Legislature |
| President | | Duration in years, months and days | | Party | Administration | Coalition | Legislature |
|---|---|---|---|---|---|---|---|
Presidents elected by the Regional Council (1970–1995)
| 1 | Piero Bassetti (Born 1928) | 29 July 1970 | 27 June 1974 | DC | Bassetti | DC • PSI • PSDI • PRI | I (1970) |
| 1 | Piero Bassetti (Born 1928) | 3 years, 10 months and 30 days | | DC | Bassetti | DC • PSI • PSDI • PRI | I (1970) |
| 2 | Cesare Golfari (1932–1994) | 27 June 1974 | 1 October 1979 | DC | Golfari I | DC • PSI • PSDI • PRI | I (1970) |
| 2 | Cesare Golfari (1932–1994) | 27 June 1974 | 1 October 1979 | DC | Golfari II | DC • PSI • PSDI • PRI | II (1975) |
| 2 | Cesare Golfari (1932–1994) | 5 years, 3 months and 5 days | | DC | Golfari II | DC • PSI • PSDI • PRI | II (1975) |
| 3 | Giuseppe Guzzetti (Born 1934) | 1 October 1979 | 17 July 1987 | DC | Guzzetti I | DC • PSI • PSDI • PRI | II (1975) |
| 3 | Giuseppe Guzzetti (Born 1934) | 1 October 1979 | 17 July 1987 | DC | Guzzetti II | DC • PSI • PSDI • PRI • PLI | III (1980) |
| 3 | Giuseppe Guzzetti (Born 1934) | 1 October 1979 | 17 July 1987 | DC | Guzzetti III | DC • PSI • PSDI • PRI • PLI | IV (1985) |
| 3 | Giuseppe Guzzetti (Born 1934) | 7 years, 9 months and 17 days | | DC | Guzzetti III | DC • PSI • PSDI • PRI • PLI | IV (1985) |
| 4 | Bruno Tabacci (Born 1946) | 17 July 1987 | 31 January 1989 | DC | Tabacci | DC • PSI • PSDI • PRI • PLI | IV (1985) |
| 4 | Bruno Tabacci (Born 1946) | 1 year, 6 months and 15 days | | DC | Tabacci | DC • PSI • PSDI • PRI • PLI | IV (1985) |
| 5 | Giuseppe Giovenzana (Born 1940) | 31 January 1989 | 12 December 1992 | DC | Giovenzana I | DC • PSI • PSDI • PRI • PLI | IV (1985) |
| 5 | Giuseppe Giovenzana (Born 1940) | 31 January 1989 | 12 December 1992 | DC | Giovenzana II | DC • PSI • PSDI • PRI • PLI | V (1990) |
| 5 | Giuseppe Giovenzana (Born 1940) | 3 years, 10 months and 13 days | | DC | Giovenzana II | DC • PSI • PSDI • PRI • PLI | V (1990) |
| 6 | Fiorella Ghilardotti (1946–2005) | 12 December 1992 | 4 June 1994 | PDS | Ghilardotti | DC • PDS • PSI • FdV • PSDI | V (1990) |
| 6 | Fiorella Ghilardotti (1946–2005) | 1 year, 5 months and 24 days | | PDS | Ghilardotti | DC • PDS • PSI • FdV • PSDI | V (1990) |
| 7 | Paolo Arrigoni (1957–2022) | 4 June 1994 | 27 June 1995 | LN | Arrigoni | PPI • LN • PDS | V (1990) |
| 7 | Paolo Arrigoni (1957–2022) | 1 year and 24 days | | LN | Arrigoni | PPI • LN • PDS | V (1990) |
Directly-elected presidents (since 1995)
| 8 | Roberto Formigoni (Born 1947) | 27 June 1995 | 18 March 2013 | CDU | Formigoni I | Pole for Freedoms (FI • AN • CDU • CCD) | VI (1995) |
| 8 | Roberto Formigoni (Born 1947) | 27 June 1995 | 18 March 2013 | FI | Formigoni II | House of Freedoms (FI • LN • AN • CDU • CCD) | VII (2000) |
| 8 | Roberto Formigoni (Born 1947) | 27 June 1995 | 18 March 2013 | FI | Formigoni III | House of Freedoms (FI • LN • AN • UDC) | VIII (2005) |
| 8 | Roberto Formigoni (Born 1947) | 27 June 1995 | 18 March 2013 | PdL | Formigoni IV | PdL • LN | IX (2010) |
| 8 | Roberto Formigoni (Born 1947) | 17 years, 8 months and 20 days | | PdL | Formigoni IV | PdL • LN | IX (2010) |
| 9 | Roberto Maroni (1955–2022) | 18 March 2013 | 26 March 2018 | LN | Maroni | LN • FI • FdI | X (2013) |
| 9 | Roberto Maroni (1955–2022) | 5 years and 9 days | | LN | Maroni | LN • FI • FdI | X (2013) |
| 10 | Attilio Fontana (Born 1952) | 26 March 2018 | Incumbent | Lega | Fontana I | Lega • FI • FdI | XI (2018) |
| 10 | Attilio Fontana (Born 1952) | 8 years, 7 months and 9 days | | Lega | Fontana II | FdI • Lega • FI | XII (2023) |

== Legislative branch ==
Composition of the Regional Council since 2023: FdI (22) PD (18) Lega (14) FI (6) LI (5) Moratti List (4) M5S (3) A–IV (3) PC (2) AVS (1) NM (1)

Composition of the Regional Council by coalition since 2023: Centre-right (49) Centre-left (24) Action – Italia Viva (7)

The Regional Council of Lombardy is composed of 80 members. 64 councillors are elected in provincial constituencies by proportional representation using the largest remainder method with a Droop quota and open lists, while 16 councillors (elected in a general ticket) come from a "regional list", including the President-elect. One seat is reserved for the candidate who comes second. If a coalition wins more than 50% of the total seats in the Council with PR, as happened during the 2000 election, only 8 candidates from the regional list will be chosen and the number of those elected in provincial constituencies will be 72. If the winning coalition receives less than 50% of votes, as happened during the 1995 election, special seats are added to the Council to ensure a large majority for the President's coalition.

The Council is elected for a five-year term, but, if the President suffers a vote of no confidence, resigns or dies, under the simul stabunt, simul cadent clause introduced in 1999 (literally they will stand together or they will fall together), also the Council is dissolved and a snap election is called.

=== Current composition ===
In the 12th legislature the Council has been composed of the following political groups:

| Party | Election | Now | Status |
|---|---|---|---|
| Brothers of Italy (FdI) | 22 / 80 | 21 / 80 | Government |
| Democratic Party (PD) | 18 / 80 | 18 / 80 | Opposition |
| League – Lombard League | 14 / 80 | 15 / 80 | Government |
| Forza Italia (FI) | 6 / 80 | 11 / 80 | Government |
| Five Star Movement (M5S) | 3 / 80 | 3 / 80 | Opposition |
| Ideal Lombardy (LI) | 5 / 80 | 3 / 80 | Government |
| Better Lombardy (LM) | 4 / 80 | 2 / 80 | Opposition |
| Civic Pact (PC) | 2 / 80 | 2 / 80 | Opposition |
| Mixed Group | 2 / 80 | 2 / 80 | External support |
| Action – Italia Viva (A–IV) / Italia Viva (IV) | 3 / 80 | 1 / 80 | Opposition |
| Greens and Left Alliance (AVS) | 1 / 80 | 1 / 80 | Opposition |
| Us Moderates – Renaissance (NM) | 1 / 80 | 1 / 80 | External support |

By coalition:

| Party | Election | Now | Status |
|---|---|---|---|
| Centre-right coalition | 49 / 80 | 53 / 80 | Government |
| Centre-left coalition | 24 / 80 | 24 / 80 | Opposition |
| Action – Italia Viva | 7 / 80 | 3 / 80 | Opposition |

== Local government ==
=== Provinces ===
Lombardy is divided in twelve provinces, which are a traditional form of local administration in the region, the first ones being yet established under Habsburg rule by Maria Theresa of Austria in the 18th century. Socialist and Christian-democratic ideas had an early diffusion in quite all the provinces around World War I. After the Fascist parenthesis, left-wing parties found their strongholds in south-eastern agricultural provinces near Emilia, especially in the Province of Mantua, while Christian Democracy obtained high scores in the northern mountainous part of the Region, where nowadays the Lega Lombarda–Lega gets a strong backing.

After the 2014 reform of local authorities the Province of Milan was replaced by the new Metropolitan City of Milan. Since 2014 the president of the province is no more elected directly by citizens, but is chosen by mayors and councilors of the municipalities of the province.

| Province | Inhabitants | President | Party | Election |
|---|---|---|---|---|
| Metropolitan City of Milan (former Province of Milan) | 3,237,101 | Giuseppe Sala (metropolitan mayor) | Independent (Democratic Party) | 2021 |
| Brescia (list) | 1,254,322 | Emanuele Moraschini | Independent (Forza Italia) | 2023 |
| Bergamo (list) | 1,102,670 | Gianfranco Gafforelli | Forza Italia | 2026 |
| Varese (list) | 878,059 | Marco Magrini | Independent (Democratic Party) | 2023 |
| Monza and Brianza (list) | 870,112 | Luca Santambrogio | Lega | 2019 |
| Como (list) | 594,657 | Fiorenzo Bongiasca | Independent (Democratic Party) | 2022 |
| Pavia (list) | 534,691 | Giovanni Palli | Lega | 2021 |
| Mantua (list) | 404,440 | Carlo Bottani | Independent (Forza Italia) | 2021 |
| Cremona (list) | 351,287 | Roberto Mariani | Democratic Party | 2024 |
| Lecco (list) | 332,435 | Alessandra Hofmann | Independent (Lega) | 2021 |
| Lodi (list) | 227,064 | Fabrizio Santantonio | Democratic Party | 2022 |
| Sondrio (list) | 178,208 | Davide Menegola | Independent (Forza Italia) | 2023 |

=== Municipalities ===
Lombardy is also divided in 1,546 comuni (municipalities), which have even more history, having been established in the Middle Ages when they were the main places of government. There are twelve provincial capital cities in Lombardy and twenty-four comuni have more than 40,000 inhabitants, most of which are ruled by the centre-left.

Provincial capitals

| Municipality | Inhabitants | Mayor | Party | Election |
|---|---|---|---|---|
| Milan (list) | 1,371,498 | Giuseppe Sala | Independent (Democratic Party) | 2021 |
| Brescia (list) | 196,850 | Laura Castelletti | Independent (Democratic Party) | 2023 |
| Monza (list) | 122,099 | Paolo Pilotto | Democratic Party | 2022 |
| Bergamo (list) | 120,207 | Elena Carnevali | Democratic Party | 2024 |
| Como (list) | 83,626 | Alessandro Rapinese | Independent | 2022 |
| Varese (list) | 78,875 | Davide Galimberti | Democratic Party | 2021 |
| Pavia (list) | 71,159 | Michele Lissia | Democratic Party | 2024 |
| Cremona (list) | 70,943 | Andrea Virgilio | Democratic Party | 2024 |
| Mantua (list) | 48,648 | Mattia Palazzi | Democratic Party | 2020 |
| Lecco (list) | 47,060 | Mauro Gattinoni | Democratic Party | 2020 |
| Lodi (list) | 44,793 | Andrea Furegato | Democratic Party | 2022 |
| Sondrio (list) | 21,180 | Marco Scaramellini | Lega | 2023 |

Other municipalities

Cities with more than 40,000 inhabitants.

| Municipality | Inhabitants | Mayor | Party | Election |
|---|---|---|---|---|
| Busto Arsizio | 82,981 | Emanuele Antonelli | Brothers of Italy | 2021 |
| Sesto San Giovanni | 79,732 | Roberto Di Stefano | Lega | 2022 |
| Cinisello Balsamo | 74,534 | Giacomo Ghilardi | Lega | 2023 |
| Vigevano | 62,384 | Andrea Ceffa | Lega | 2020 |
| Legnano | 59,816 | Lorenzo Radice | Democratic Party | 2020 |
| Gallarate | 52,826 | Andrea Cassani | Lega | 2021 |
| Rho | 50,604 | Pietro Romano | Democratic Party | 2021 |
| Paderno Dugnano | 47,084 | Anna Varisco | Democratic Party | 2024 |
| Cologno Monzese | 46,790 | Stefano Zanelli | Democratic Party | 2023 |
| Lissone | 46,142 | Laura Borella | Lega | 2022 |
| Seregno | 44,832 | Alberto Rossi | Democratic Party | 2023 |
| Desio | 41,635 | Simone Gargiulo | Democratic Party | 2021 |
| Rozzano | 41,437 | Gianni Ferretti | Forza Italia | 2019 |

== Parties and elections ==
=== Latest regional election ===
In the latest regional election, which took place on 12–13 February 2023, Attilio Fontana (Lega Lombarda–Lega) was re-elected President of Lombardy with the support of centre-right coalition.

12–13 February 2023 Lombard regional election results
| Candidates | Votes | % | Seats | Parties | Votes | % | Seats |
|---|---|---|---|---|---|---|---|
| Attilio Fontana | 1,774,477 | 54.67 | 1 | | | | |
| Attilio Fontana | 1,774,477 | 54.67 | 1 | Brothers of Italy | 725,402 | 25.18 | 22 |
| Attilio Fontana | 1,774,477 | 54.67 | 1 | League – Lombard League | 476,175 | 16.53 | 14 |
| Attilio Fontana | 1,774,477 | 54.67 | 1 | Forza Italia | 208,420 | 7.23 | 6 |
| Attilio Fontana | 1,774,477 | 54.67 | 1 | Fontana for President | 177,387 | 6.16 | 5 |
| Attilio Fontana | 1,774,477 | 54.67 | 1 | Us Moderates – Renaissance | 33,711 | 1.17 | 1 |
| Attilio Fontana | 1,774,477 | 54.67 | 1 | Total | 1,621,095 | 56.27 | 48 |
| Pierfrancesco Majorino | 1,101,417 | 33.93 | 1 | | | | |
| Pierfrancesco Majorino | 1,101,417 | 33.93 | 1 | Democratic Party | 628,774 | 21.82 | 17 |
| Pierfrancesco Majorino | 1,101,417 | 33.93 | 1 | Five Star Movement | 113,229 | 3.93 | 3 |
| Pierfrancesco Majorino | 1,101,417 | 33.93 | 1 | Civic Pact – Majorino for President | 110,126 | 3.82 | 2 |
| Pierfrancesco Majorino | 1,101,417 | 33.93 | 1 | Greens and Left Alliance | 93,019 | 3.23 | 1 |
| Pierfrancesco Majorino | 1,101,417 | 33.93 | 1 | Total | 945,148 | 32.80 | 23 |
| Letizia Moratti | 320,346 | 9.87 | – | Moratti for President | 152,652 | 5.30 | 4 |
| Letizia Moratti | 320,346 | 9.87 | – | Action – Italia Viva | 122,356 | 4.25 | 3 |
| Letizia Moratti | 320,346 | 9.87 | – | Total | 275,008 | 9.55 | 7 |
| Mara Ghidorzi | 49,514 | 1.53 | – | People's Union | 39,913 | 1.39 | – |
| Total candidates | 3,245,754 | 100.00 | 2 | Total parties | 2,881,164 | 100.00 | 78 |
Source: Ministry of the Interior – Historical Archive of Elections
