= Elections in Lombardy =

Elections in Italian region

This page gathers the results of elections in Lombardy.

== Regional elections ==
=== Latest regional election ===
In the latest regional election, which took place on 12–13 February 2023, Attilio Fontana (Lega Lombarda–Lega) was re-elected President of Lombardy with the support of centre-right coalition.

12–13 February 2023 Lombard regional election results
| Candidates | Votes | % | Seats | Parties | Votes | % | Seats |
|---|---|---|---|---|---|---|---|
| Attilio Fontana | 1,774,477 | 54.67 | 1 | | | | |
| Attilio Fontana | 1,774,477 | 54.67 | 1 | Brothers of Italy | 725,402 | 25.18 | 22 |
| Attilio Fontana | 1,774,477 | 54.67 | 1 | League – Lombard League | 476,175 | 16.53 | 14 |
| Attilio Fontana | 1,774,477 | 54.67 | 1 | Forza Italia | 208,420 | 7.23 | 6 |
| Attilio Fontana | 1,774,477 | 54.67 | 1 | Fontana for President | 177,387 | 6.16 | 5 |
| Attilio Fontana | 1,774,477 | 54.67 | 1 | Us Moderates – Renaissance | 33,711 | 1.17 | 1 |
| Attilio Fontana | 1,774,477 | 54.67 | 1 | Total | 1,621,095 | 56.27 | 48 |
| Pierfrancesco Majorino | 1,101,417 | 33.93 | 1 | | | | |
| Pierfrancesco Majorino | 1,101,417 | 33.93 | 1 | Democratic Party | 628,774 | 21.82 | 17 |
| Pierfrancesco Majorino | 1,101,417 | 33.93 | 1 | Five Star Movement | 113,229 | 3.93 | 3 |
| Pierfrancesco Majorino | 1,101,417 | 33.93 | 1 | Civic Pact – Majorino for President | 110,126 | 3.82 | 2 |
| Pierfrancesco Majorino | 1,101,417 | 33.93 | 1 | Greens and Left Alliance | 93,019 | 3.23 | 1 |
| Pierfrancesco Majorino | 1,101,417 | 33.93 | 1 | Total | 945,148 | 32.80 | 23 |
| Letizia Moratti | 320,346 | 9.87 | – | Moratti for President | 152,652 | 5.30 | 4 |
| Letizia Moratti | 320,346 | 9.87 | – | Action – Italia Viva | 122,356 | 4.25 | 3 |
| Letizia Moratti | 320,346 | 9.87 | – | Total | 275,008 | 9.55 | 7 |
| Mara Ghidorzi | 49,514 | 1.53 | – | People's Union | 39,913 | 1.39 | – |
| Blank and invalid votes | 93,265 | 2.79 | | | | | |
| Total candidates | 3,245,754 | 100.00 | 2 | Total parties | 2,881,164 | 100.00 | 78 |
| Registered voters/turnout | 8,010,538 | 41.68 | | | | | |
Source: Ministry of the Interior – Historical Archive of Elections

=== List of previous regional elections ===
- 1970 Lombard regional election
- 1975 Lombard regional election
- 1980 Lombard regional election
- 1985 Lombard regional election
- 1990 Lombard regional election
- 1995 Lombard regional election
- 2000 Lombard regional election
- 2005 Lombard regional election
- 2010 Lombard regional election
- 2013 Lombard regional election
- 2018 Lombard regional election
- 2023 Lombard regional election

== Italian general elections ==
- 1946 Italian general election in Lombardy
- 1948 Italian general election in Lombardy
- 1953 Italian general election in Lombardy
- 1958 Italian general election in Lombardy
- 1963 Italian general election in Lombardy
- 1968 Italian general election in Lombardy
- 1972 Italian general election in Lombardy
- 1976 Italian general election in Lombardy
- 1979 Italian general election in Lombardy
- 1983 Italian general election in Lombardy
- 1987 Italian general election in Lombardy
- 1992 Italian general election in Lombardy
- 1994 Italian general election in Lombardy
- 1996 Italian general election in Lombardy
- 2001 Italian general election in Lombardy
- 2006 Italian general election in Lombardy
- 2008 Italian general election in Lombardy
- 2013 Italian general election in Lombardy
- 2018 Italian general election in Lombardy
- 2022 Italian general election in Lombardy

== European Parliament elections ==
=== Latest EP election ===
| Party | Votes | % |
|---|---|---|
| Brothers of Italy | 1,336,243 | 31.8 |
| Democratic Party | 951,330 | 22.6 |
| League | 550,171 | 13.1 |
| Forza Italia–Us Moderates | 391,411 | 9.3 |
| Greens and Left Alliance | 285,069 | 6.8 |
| Five Star Movement | 238,448 | 5.7 |
| Action | 168,972 | 4.0 |
| United States of Europe | 156,847 | 3.7 |
| Peace Land Dignity | 77,261 | 1.8 |
| Freedom | 27,277 | 0.7 |
| Popular Alternative | 13,898 | 0.3 |
| Valdostan Rally | 6,400 | 0.2 |
| Total | 4,203,327 | 100.00 |

Source: Ministry of the Interior

=== List of previous EP elections ===
- 1979 European Parliament election in Lombardy
- 1984 European Parliament election in Lombardy
- 1989 European Parliament election in Lombardy
- 1994 European Parliament election in Lombardy
- 1999 European Parliament election in Lombardy
- 2004 European Parliament election in Lombardy
- 2009 European Parliament election in Lombardy
- 2014 European Parliament election in Lombardy
- 2019 European Parliament election in Lombardy
- 2024 European Parliament election in Lombardy
