= List of presidents of Lombardy =

This is the list of presidents of Lombardy since 1970. Colours in the number column reflect their political parties.

President		Term of office		Party	Administration	Coalition	Legislature
President		Duration in years, months and days		Party	Administration	Coalition	Legislature
Presidents elected by the Regional Council (1970–1995)
1	Piero Bassetti (Born 1928)	29 July 1970	27 June 1974	DC	Bassetti	DC • PSI • PSDI • PRI	I (1970)
1	Piero Bassetti (Born 1928)	3 years, 10 months and 30 days		DC	Bassetti	DC • PSI • PSDI • PRI	I (1970)
2	Cesare Golfari (1932–1994)	27 June 1974	1 October 1979	DC	Golfari I	DC • PSI • PSDI • PRI	I (1970)
2	Cesare Golfari (1932–1994)	27 June 1974	1 October 1979	DC	Golfari II	DC • PSI • PSDI • PRI	II (1975)
2	Cesare Golfari (1932–1994)	5 years, 3 months and 5 days		DC	Golfari II	DC • PSI • PSDI • PRI	II (1975)
3	Giuseppe Guzzetti (Born 1934)	1 October 1979	17 July 1987	DC	Guzzetti I	DC • PSI • PSDI • PRI	II (1975)
3	Giuseppe Guzzetti (Born 1934)	1 October 1979	17 July 1987	DC	Guzzetti II	DC • PSI • PSDI • PRI • PLI	III (1980)
3	Giuseppe Guzzetti (Born 1934)	1 October 1979	17 July 1987	DC	Guzzetti III	DC • PSI • PSDI • PRI • PLI	IV (1985)
3	Giuseppe Guzzetti (Born 1934)	7 years, 9 months and 17 days		DC	Guzzetti III	DC • PSI • PSDI • PRI • PLI	IV (1985)
4	Bruno Tabacci (Born 1946)	17 July 1987	31 January 1989	DC	Tabacci	DC • PSI • PSDI • PRI • PLI	IV (1985)
4	Bruno Tabacci (Born 1946)	1 year, 6 months and 15 days		DC	Tabacci	DC • PSI • PSDI • PRI • PLI	IV (1985)
5	Giuseppe Giovenzana (Born 1940)	31 January 1989	12 December 1992	DC	Giovenzana I	DC • PSI • PSDI • PRI • PLI	IV (1985)
5	Giuseppe Giovenzana (Born 1940)	31 January 1989	12 December 1992	DC	Giovenzana II	DC • PSI • PSDI • PRI • PLI	V (1990)
5	Giuseppe Giovenzana (Born 1940)	3 years, 10 months and 13 days		DC	Giovenzana II	DC • PSI • PSDI • PRI • PLI	V (1990)
6	Fiorella Ghilardotti (1946–2005)	12 December 1992	4 June 1994	PDS	Ghilardotti	DC • PDS • PSI • FdV • PSDI	V (1990)
6	Fiorella Ghilardotti (1946–2005)	1 year, 5 months and 24 days		PDS	Ghilardotti	DC • PDS • PSI • FdV • PSDI	V (1990)
7	Paolo Arrigoni (1957–2022)	4 June 1994	27 June 1995	LN	Arrigoni	PPI • LN • PDS	V (1990)
7	Paolo Arrigoni (1957–2022)	1 year and 24 days		LN	Arrigoni	PPI • LN • PDS	V (1990)
Directly-elected presidents (since 1995)
8	Roberto Formigoni (Born 1947)	27 June 1995	18 March 2013	CDU	Formigoni I	Pole for Freedoms (FI • AN • CDU • CCD)	VI (1995)
8	Roberto Formigoni (Born 1947)	27 June 1995	18 March 2013	FI	Formigoni II	House of Freedoms (FI • LN • AN • CDU • CCD)	VII (2000)
8	Roberto Formigoni (Born 1947)	27 June 1995	18 March 2013	FI	Formigoni III	House of Freedoms (FI • LN • AN • UDC)	VIII (2005)
8	Roberto Formigoni (Born 1947)	27 June 1995	18 March 2013	PdL	Formigoni IV	PdL • LN	IX (2010)
8	Roberto Formigoni (Born 1947)	17 years, 8 months and 20 days		PdL	Formigoni IV	PdL • LN	IX (2010)
9	Roberto Maroni (1955–2022)	18 March 2013	26 March 2018	LN	Maroni	LN • FI • FdI	X (2013)
9	Roberto Maroni (1955–2022)	5 years and 9 days		LN	Maroni	LN • FI • FdI	X (2013)
10	Attilio Fontana (Born 1952)	26 March 2018	Incumbent	Lega	Fontana I	Lega • FI • FdI	XI (2018)
10	Attilio Fontana (Born 1952)	8 years, 3 months and 7 days		Lega	Fontana II	FdI • Lega • FI	XII (2023)
