= List of presidents of the Regional Council of Lombardy =

This is the list of the presidents of the Regional Council of Lombardy during all its history.

Name	Period		Regional legislature
Gino Colombo (DC)	6 July 1970	24 July 1975	I (1970)
Sergio Marvelli (PSI)	24 July 1975	20 April 1978	II (1975)
Carlo Smuraglia (PCI)	20 April 1978	24 July 1980	II (1975)
Sergio Marvelli (PSI)	24 July 1980	6 October 1983	III (1980)
Renzo Peruzzotti (PSI)	6 October 1983	18 June 1985	III (1980)
Ugo Finetti (PSI)	18 June 1985	5 August 1985	IV (1985)
Fabio Semenza (PRI)	5 August 1985	27 June 1990	IV (1985)
Giampietro Borghini (PCI)	27 June 1990	12 February 1992	V (1990)
Claudio Bonfanti (PSI)	12 February 1992	9 December 1992	V (1990)
Francesco Zaccaria (PSI)	9 December 1992	19 June 1995	V (1990)
Giancarlo Morandi (FI)	19 June 1995	12 June 2000	VI (1995)
Attilio Fontana (LN)	12 June 2000	6 June 2005	VII (2000)
Attilio Fontana (LN)	6 June 2005	6 July 2006	VIII (2005)
Ettore Albertoni (LN)	6 July 2006	15 July 2008	VIII (2005)
Giulio De Capitani (LN)	15 July 2008	11 May 2010	VIII (2005)
Davide Boni (LN)	11 May 2010	17 April 2012	IX (2010)
Fabrizio Cecchetti (LN)	17 April 2012	27 October 2012	IX (2010)
Regional Council suspended (Note: On 27 October 2012, 74 members of the Regional Council resigned. The Council was automatically dissolved.)
Raffaele Cattaneo (FI)	28 March 2013	5 April 2018	X (2013)
Alessandro Fermi (FI)	5 April 2018	incumbent	XI (2018)
