= Regional Council of Lombardy =

Legislative organ of Lombardy, Italy

Regional Council of Lombardy Consiglio Regionale della Lombardia
- 12th legislature

Type
- Type: Regional council Unicameral
- Established: 6 July 1970

Leadership
- President: Federico Romani, FdI since 15 March 2023

Structure
- Seats: 80
- Political groups: Government (52+1): FdI (21); Lega (15); FI (11); LI (3); Mixed (2); NM (1); Opposition (27): PD (18); M5S (3); LM (2); PC (2); IV (1); AVS (1)
- Length of term: 5 years
- Salary: €75,924/year + refunds

Elections
- Voting system: Party-list semi-proportional representation with majority bonus D'Hondt method
- Last election: 12 February 2023
- Next election: No lather than 13 February 2028

Meeting place
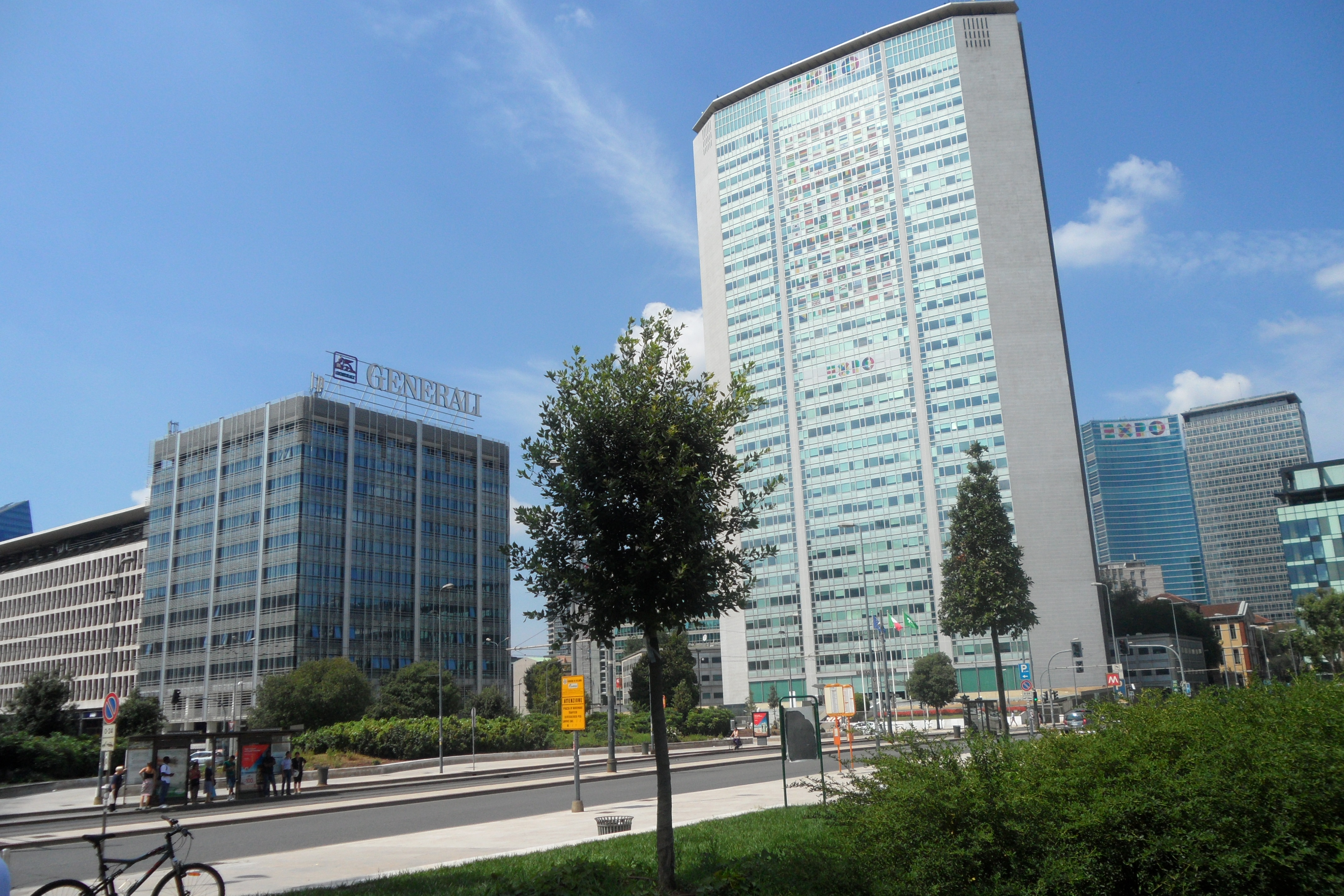
- Pirelli Tower, Milan

Website
- Official website

The Regional Council of Lombardy (Italian: Consiglio Regionale della Lombardia) is the legislative assembly of Lombardy, Italy.

It was first elected in 1970, when the ordinary regions were instituted, on the basis of the Constitution of Italy of 1948.

== Composition ==
The political system of the Regions of Italy was changed in 1995, when a semi-presidential system was introduced. If until that year the council was elected under a pure proportional system and the President of Lombardy was chosen and dismissed by the council, since 1995 the President and the council are jointly elected by the people.

The Regional Council of Lombardy is composed of 80 members. From 1995 to 2012, 64 councillors were elected in provincial constituencies by proportional representation using the largest remainder method with a Droop quota and open lists, while 16 councillors (elected in bloc) came from a "regional list", including the President-elect. One seat was reserved for the candidate who came second. If a coalition won more than 40 seats with PR, as happened during the 2000 election, only 8 candidates from the regional list would be chosen and the number of those elected in provincial constituencies will be 72. If the winning coalition received less than 50% of votes, as happened during the 1995 election, special seats were added to the council to ensure a large majority for the President's coalition.

A new Lombard electoral law was adopted on 26 October 2012. While the President of Lombardy and the leader of the opposition are still elected at-large, 78 councillors, instead of 64 as it was before, are elected by party lists under a form of semi-proportional representation. The winning coalition receives a jackpot of at least 45 seats, which are divided between all majority parties using the D'Hondt method, as it happens between the losing lists. Each party then distributes its seats to its provincial lists, where candidates are openly selected.

The council is elected for a five-year term, but, if the President suffers a vote of no confidence, resigns or dies, under the simul stabunt, simul cadent clause introduced in 1999 (literally they will stand together or they will fall together), also the council is dissolved and a snap election is called.

The Council chooses its speaker, called President of the council (Presidente del Consiglio).

=== Political groups (2023–2028) ===
In the 12th legislature the Council has been composed of the following political groups:

Party	Election	Now	Status
Brothers of Italy (FdI)	22 / 80	21 / 80	Government
Democratic Party (PD)	18 / 80	18 / 80	Opposition
League – Lombard League	14 / 80	15 / 80	Government
Forza Italia (FI)	6 / 80	11 / 80	Government
Five Star Movement (M5S)	3 / 80	3 / 80	Opposition
Ideal Lombardy (LI)	5 / 80	3 / 80	Government
Better Lombardy (LM)	4 / 80	2 / 80	Opposition
Civic Pact (PC)	2 / 80	2 / 80	Opposition
Mixed Group	2 / 80	2 / 80	External support
Action – Italia Viva (A–IV) / Italia Viva (IV)	3 / 80	1 / 80	Opposition
Greens and Left Alliance (AVS)	1 / 80	1 / 80	Opposition
Us Moderates – Renaissance (NM)	1 / 80	1 / 80	External support

By coalition:

Party	Election	Now	Status
Centre-right coalition	49 / 80	53 / 80	Government
Centre-left coalition	24 / 80	24 / 80	Opposition
Action – Italia Viva	7 / 80	3 / 80	Opposition

=== Historical composition ===
Pirelli Tower in Milan has been the seat of the Regional Council and related offices since 1970

Election	DC	PCI	PSI	PLI	PRI	PSDI	MSI	Others	Total
7 June 1970	36	19	9	4	2	5	3	2	80
15 June 1975	32	25	11	2	2	3	3	2	80
8 June 1980	34	23	11	2	2	3	3	2	80
12 May 1985	31	22	12	1	4	2	4	4	80
6 May 1990	25	15	12	1	2	1	2	22	80

Election	Majority	Opposition	Council	President of the Region
23 April 1995	Centre-right (Pole for Freedoms) 54 / 90	Centre-left (The Olive Tree) 19 / 90 Lega Nord 12 / 90 PRC 5 / 90		Roberto Formigoni (1995–2013)
16 April 2000	Centre-right (House of Freedoms) 51 / 80	Centre-left (The Olive Tree) 26 / 80 Bonino List 3 / 80		Roberto Formigoni (1995–2013)
3 April 2005	Centre-right (House of Freedoms) 52 / 80	Centre-left (The Union) 28 / 80		Roberto Formigoni (1995–2013)
28 March 2010	Centre-right 49 / 80	Centre-left 28 / 80 UDC 3 / 80		Roberto Formigoni (1995–2013)
24 February 2013 (snap election)	Centre-right 49 / 80	Centre-left 22 / 80 M5S 9 / 80		Roberto Maroni (2013–2018)
4 March 2018	Centre-right 49 / 80	Centre-left 18 / 80 M5S 13 / 80		Attilio Fontana (since 2018)
12 February 2023	Centre-right 49 / 80	Centre-left 24 / 80 A–IV 7 / 80		Attilio Fontana (since 2018)

== Presidents ==
This is a list of the Presidents of the Regional Council (Italian: Presidenti del Consiglio regionale):

Name	Period		Regional Legislature
Gino Colombo (DC)	6 July 1970	24 July 1975	I (1970)
Sergio Marvelli (PSI)	24 July 1975	20 April 1978	II (1975)
Carlo Smuraglia (PCI)	20 April 1978	24 July 1980	II (1975)
Sergio Marvelli (PSI)	24 July 1980	6 October 1983	III (1980)
Renzo Peruzzotti (PSI)	6 October 1983	18 June 1985	III (1980)
Ugo Finetti (PSI)	18 June 1985	5 August 1985	IV (1985)
Fabio Semenza (PRI)	5 August 1985	27 June 1990	IV (1985)
Giampietro Borghini (PCI)	27 June 1990	12 February 1992	V (1990)
Claudio Bonfanti (PSI)	12 February 1992	9 December 1992	V (1990)
Francesco Zaccaria (PSI)	9 December 1992	19 June 1995	V (1990)
Giancarlo Morandi (FI)	19 June 1995	12 June 2000	VI (1995)
Attilio Fontana (LN)	12 June 2000	6 June 2005	VII (2000)
Attilio Fontana (LN)	6 June 2005	6 July 2006	VIII (2005)
Ettore Albertoni (LN)	6 July 2006	15 July 2008	VIII (2005)
Giulio De Capitani (LN)	15 July 2008	11 May 2010	VIII (2005)
Davide Boni (LN)	11 May 2010	17 April 2012	IX (2010)
Fabrizio Cecchetti (LN)	17 April 2012	27 October 2012	IX (2010)
Regional Council suspended (Note: On 27 October 2012, 74 members of the Regional Council resigned. The Council was automatically dissolved.)
Raffaele Cattaneo (FI)	28 March 2013	5 April 2018	X (2013)
Alessandro Fermi (FI)	5 April 2018	15 March 2023	XI (2018)
Federico Romani (FdI)	15 March 2023	Incumbent	XII (2023)

== See also ==
- Regional council
- Politics of Lombardy
- President of Lombardy
