= 2023 Lombard regional election =

- 12–13 February 2023

All 80 seats to the Regional Council of Lombardy
- Turnout: 41.61% (▼31.49%)
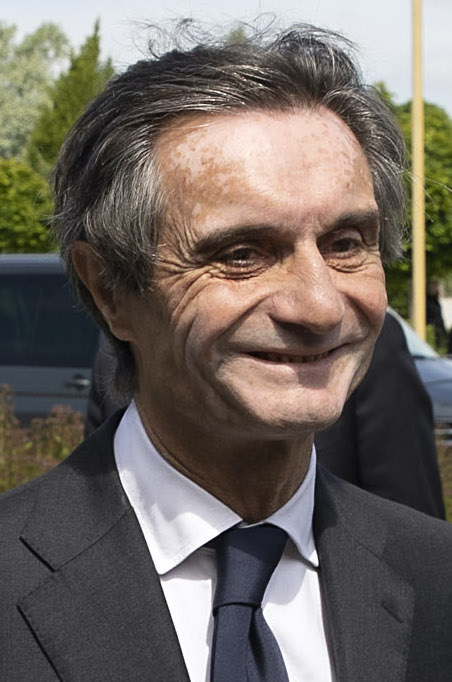

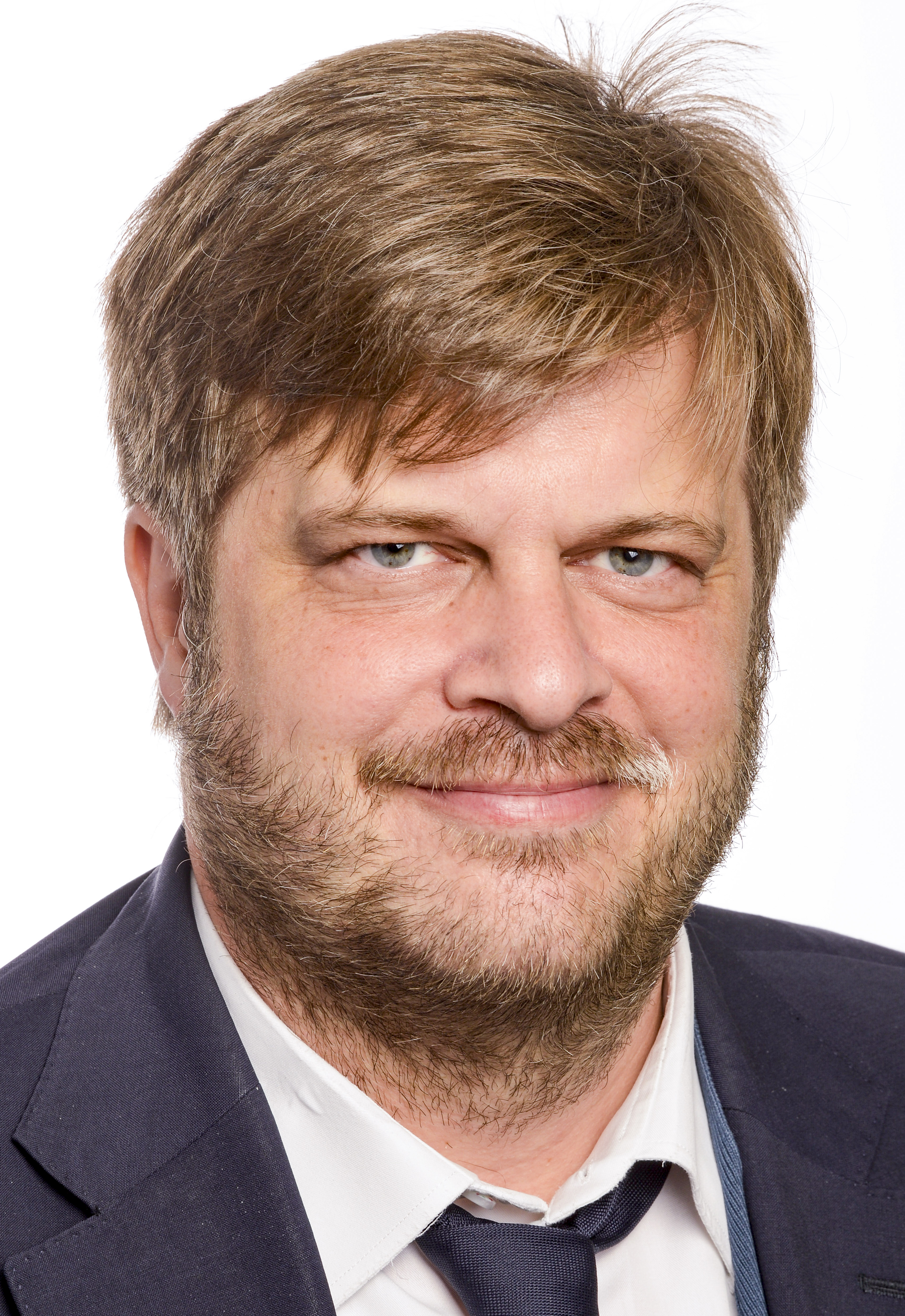

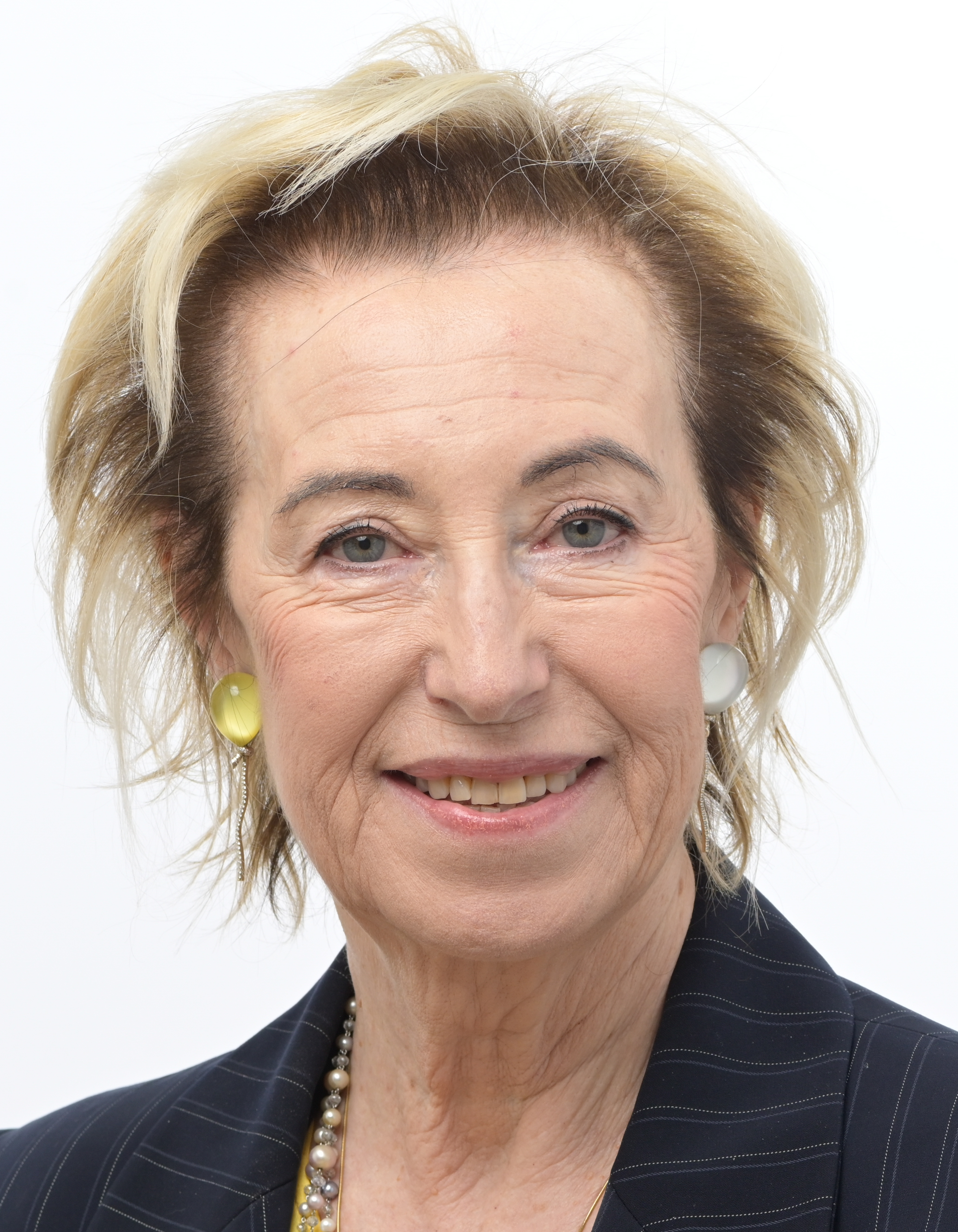
	Majority party	Minority party	Third party
Candidate	Attilio Fontana	Pierfrancesco Majorino	Letizia Moratti
Party	Lega	Democratic Party	Independent
Alliance	Centre-right	Centre-left	Action – Italia Viva
Last election	49 seats, 49.8%	31 seats, 48.4%	New
Seats won	49	24	7
Seat change	Steady	▼7	▲7
Popular vote	1,774,477	1,101,417	320,346
Percentage	54.6%	33.9%	9.9%
Swing	▲4.8%	▼14.5%	▲9.9%
- 2023 Lombard regional election map results
President before election
Attilio Fontana
Lega
Elected President
Attilio Fontana
Lega

The 2023 Lombard regional election took place on 12 and 13 February 2023. The election took place concurrently with the 2023 Lazio regional election, as decided by the Italian government on 9 December 2022.

According to the final results, Attilio Fontana was reelected President of Lombardy with more than 54% of the votes, obtaining the greater bonus given by the electoral law. Voter turnout was registered at 41.61%, the lowest ever recorded for a regional election.

== Electoral system ==
Since 2012, Lombardy adopted its own legislation to elect its regional council, which is similar to the national Tatarella Law of 1995. While the president of Lombardy and the leader of the opposition are still elected at-large, 78 councilors are elected by party lists under a form of semi-proportional representation. The winning coalition receives a jackpot of at least 45 seats, which are divided between all majority parties using the D'Hondt method, as it happens between the losing lists. Each party then distributes its seats to its provincial lists, where candidates are selected through open lists. According to the Law 17 February 1968, no. 108, the Regional Council is elected every five years. The election can take place no earlier than the fourth Sunday before the completion of this five years period and no later than 60 days after that date.

== Political parties and candidates ==
Political party or alliance	Constituent lists	Previous result		Candidate
Political party or alliance	Constituent lists	Votes (%)	Seats	Candidate
Centre-right coalition	League (Lega)	29.6	28	Attilio Fontana
Centre-right coalition	Forza Italia (FI)	14.3	14	Attilio Fontana
Centre-right coalition	Brothers of Italy (FdI)	3.6	3	Attilio Fontana
Centre-right coalition	Ideal Lombardy – Fontana for President (Note: Including Coraggio Italia (CI), Us of the Centre (NdC), Popular Alternative (AP), and Italian Republican Party (PRI))	1.5	1	Attilio Fontana
Centre-right coalition	Us Moderates – Renaissance	1.3	1	Attilio Fontana
Centre-left coalition	Democratic Party (PD)	19.2	15	Pierfrancesco Majorino
Centre-left coalition	Five Star Movement (M5S)	17.8	13	Pierfrancesco Majorino
Centre-left coalition	Greens and Left Alliance (AVS)	—N/a	—N/a	Pierfrancesco Majorino
Centre-left coalition	Civic Pact – Majorino for President (Note: Including Italian Radicals (RI), Possible (Pos), Europeanist Civic Lombard Movement (MLCE), Green and Civic Alliance (AVEC), Solidary Democracy (DEMOS), and Volt Italy (Volt))	—N/a	—N/a	Pierfrancesco Majorino
Centre coalition	Action – Italia Viva (A–IV)	—N/a	—N/a	Letizia Moratti
Centre coalition	Moratti for President (Note: Including Great North (GN))	—N/a	—N/a	Letizia Moratti
People's Union (UP)		—N/a	—N/a	Mara Ghidorzi

== Opinion polling ==
Candidates

Date	Polling firm	Sample size	Fontana	Majorino	Moratti	Others	Lead
12–13 Feb 2023	Election results	—N/a	54.7	33.9	9.9	1.5	20.8
26 Jan 2023	Noto	TBD	51.5	29.0	18.0	1.5	22.5
24–26 Jan 2023	SWG	1,000	48.0	34.0	16.0	2.0	14.0
23–26 Jan 2023	Quorum	400	48.4	34.4	14.3	2.9	14.0
23–25 Jan 2023	IZI	1,004	45.0	39.5	14.0	1.5	5.5
16–24 Jan 2023	Ipsos	1,000	45.0	33.8	19.0	2.2	11.2
10-18 Jan 2023	Index	800	45.0	36.0	17.5	1.5	9.0
13–15 Jan 2023	IZI	1,008	43.9	39.8	14.8	1.5	4.1
9–12 Jan 2023	Winpoll	2,000	41.3	25.2	27.6	5.9	13.7
5–6 Jan 2023	IZI	1,012	43.2	39.0	17.8	—N/a	4.2
5 Dec 2022	IZI	1,013	45.1	40.1	14.8	—N/a	5.0

Hypothetical candidates

Date	Polling firm	Sample size	Fontana	Other CDX	Majorino	Other CSX	Moratti	Other CX	M5S	Others	Lead
30 Nov – 1 Dec 2022	Winpoll	1,000	43.9	—N/a	24.5	—N/a	28.4	—N/a	w. CSX	3.2 (Note: Vittorio Agnoletto)	15.5
30 Nov – 1 Dec 2022	Winpoll	1,000	42.8	—N/a	20.9	—N/a	27.1	—N/a	6.3	2.9	15.7
25–28 Nov 2022	BiDiMedia	3,000	47.6	—N/a	29.0	—N/a	15.0	—N/a	5.9	2.5	18.6
25–28 Nov 2022	BiDiMedia	3,000	52.7	—N/a	35.7	—N/a	w. CSX	—N/a	9.0	2.6	17.0
25–28 Nov 2022	BiDiMedia	3,000	50.0	—N/a	—N/a	26.0 (Note: Letizia Moratti)	—N/a	—N/a	8.0	16.6	24.0
21–22 Nov 2022	IZI	1,004	45.2	—N/a	29.8	—N/a	13.4	—N/a	11.6	—N/a	15.4
3–4 Nov 2022	Winpoll	1,000	51.1	—N/a	—N/a	42.6 (Note: Carlo Cottarelli)	—N/a	—N/a	—N/a	6.3	8.5
3–4 Nov 2022	Winpoll	1,000	43.3	—N/a	—N/a	49.1	—N/a	—N/a	—N/a	7.6	5.8
3–4 Nov 2022	Winpoll	1,000	53.0	—N/a	39.3	—N/a	—N/a	—N/a	—N/a	7.7	13.7
3–4 Nov 2022	Winpoll	1,000	52.5	—N/a	—N/a	38.7 (Note: Pierfrancesco Maran)	—N/a	—N/a	—N/a	8.8	13.8
7–10 Oct 2022	Winpoll	1,700	—N/a	49.7	—N/a	34.4	—N/a	6.8	3.5	5.6	15.3
7–10 Oct 2022	Winpoll	1,700	—N/a	50.5	—N/a	31.7 (Note: Giuseppe Sala)	—N/a	5.8	5.0	7.0	18.8
7–10 Oct 2022	Winpoll	1,700	35.3	—N/a	—N/a	47.8	—N/a	—N/a	8.7	8.2	12.5

Political parties

Date	Polling firm	Sample size	Centre-right					Centre-left				Centre		UP	Others	Lead
Date	Polling firm	Sample size	FdI	Lega	FI	LIF	NM	PD	M5S	AVS	PCM	A–IV	MP	UP	Others	Lead
12–13 Feb 2023	Election results	—N/a	25.2	16.5	7.2	6.2	1.2	21.8	3.9	3.2	3.8	4.2	5.3	1.4	—N/a	3.4
24–26 Jan 2023	SWG	1,000	24.8	14.1	7.8	3.0	1.0	16.7	7.6	3.8	6.3	7.3	5.8	1.8	—N/a	8.1
23–25 Jan 2023	IZI	1,004	23.5	12.9	6.6	2.1	2.1	19.8	9.2	5.9	2.5	9.1	4.5	1.8	—N/a	3.7
16–24 Jan 2023	Ipsos	1,000	24.9	13.4	6.5	4.7		18.4	8.1	6.0		7.5	8.6	1.9	—N/a	6.5
13–15 Jan 2023	IZI	1,008	25.7	13.5	6.7	1.4	—N/a	18.9	10.2	6.9	3.5	8.5	3.2	1.5	—N/a	6.8
5–6 Jan 2023	IZI	1,012	27.1	13.4	7.6	1.2	—N/a	17.5	8.3	5.4	2.7	10.3	3.5	—N/a	3.4	9.6
5 Dec 2022	IZI	1,013	27.0	14.9	8.9	—N/a	—N/a	17.0	9.8	5.4	—N/a	9.8	—N/a	—N/a	7.2	10.0
25–28 Nov 2022	BiDiMedia	3,000	31.0	11.4	6.9	—N/a	—N/a	17.2	9.0	3.7	—N/a	11.8	—N/a	1.1	6.9	13.8
21–22 Nov 2022	IZI	1,004	31.0	15.8	4.1	—N/a	—N/a	16.8	9.3	5.0	—N/a	9.3	—N/a	—N/a	8.7	14.2
7–10 Oct 2022	Winpoll	1,700	23.7	11.5	7.0	—N/a	—N/a	20.1	5.9	4.1	—N/a	6.5	11.8	0.7	8.7	3.6

== Results ==
Composition of the Regional Council of Lombardy by coalition since 2023: Centre-right (49) Centre-left (24) Action – Italia Viva (7)

12–13 February 2023 Lombard regional election results
Candidates	Votes	%	Seats	Parties	Votes	%	Seats
Attilio Fontana	1,774,477	54.67	1				
Attilio Fontana	1,774,477	54.67	1	Brothers of Italy	725,402	25.18	22
Attilio Fontana	1,774,477	54.67	1	League – Lombard League	476,175	16.53	14
Attilio Fontana	1,774,477	54.67	1	Forza Italia	208,420	7.23	6
Attilio Fontana	1,774,477	54.67	1	Fontana for President	177,387	6.16	5
Attilio Fontana	1,774,477	54.67	1	Us Moderates – Renaissance	33,711	1.17	1
Attilio Fontana	1,774,477	54.67	1	Total	1,621,095	56.27	48
Pierfrancesco Majorino	1,101,417	33.93	1				
Pierfrancesco Majorino	1,101,417	33.93	1	Democratic Party	628,774	21.82	17
Pierfrancesco Majorino	1,101,417	33.93	1	Five Star Movement	113,229	3.93	3
Pierfrancesco Majorino	1,101,417	33.93	1	Civic Pact – Majorino for President	110,126	3.82	2
Pierfrancesco Majorino	1,101,417	33.93	1	Greens and Left Alliance	93,019	3.23	1
Pierfrancesco Majorino	1,101,417	33.93	1	Total	945,148	32.80	23
Letizia Moratti	320,346	9.87	–	Moratti for President	152,652	5.30	4
Letizia Moratti	320,346	9.87	–	Action – Italia Viva	122,356	4.25	3
Letizia Moratti	320,346	9.87	–	Total	275,008	9.55	7
Mara Ghidorzi	49,514	1.53	–	People's Union	39,913	1.39	–
Blank and invalid votes	93,265	2.79					
Total candidates	3,245,754	100.00	2	Total parties	2,881,164	100.00	78
Registered voters/turnout	8,010,538	41.68					
Source: Ministry of the Interior – Historical Archive of Elections

=== Results by provinces ===
Province	Attilio Fontana	Pierfrancesco Majorino	Letizia Moratti	Mara Ghidorzi	Turnout
Milan	454,439 44.86%	425,848 42.04%	115,573 11.41%	17,181 1.70%	41.55%
Brescia	269,589 61.88%	125,456 28.79%	34,667 7.96%	5,983 1.37%	45.33%
Bergamo	234,229 60.88%	112,339 29.20%	31,790 8.26%	6,363 1.65%	44.55%
Varese	164,856 59.43%	81,801 29.49%	26,921 9.70%	3,840 1.38%	38.49%
Monza and Brianza	155,469 53.73%	98,945 34.19%	30,639 10.59%	4,310 1.49%	42.54%
Como	119,679 61.22%	53,190 27.21%	20,012 10.24%	2,607 1.33%	39.08%
Pavia	99,437 60.53%	47,834 29.12%	14,368 8.75%	2,644 1.61%	38.50%
Mantua	64,567 54.17%	41,891 35.15%	10,873 9.12%	1,855 1.56%	36.75%
Cremona	68,148 57.90%	36,908 31.36%	10,534 8.95%	2,111 1.79%	42.46%
Lecco	67,009 55.89%	38,083 31.77%	13,177 10.99%	1,619 1.35%	44.92%
Lodi	39,233 57.05%	23,094 33.58%	5,904 8.59%	535 0.78%	40.76%
Sondrio	37,822 62.82%	16,028 26.62%	5,888 9.78%	466 0.77%	37.96%

=== Results by capital city ===
City	Attilio Fontana	Pierfrancesco Majorino	Letizia Moratti	Mara Ghidorzi	Turnout
Milan	160,781 37.69%	199,760 46.83%	58,994 13.83%	7,006 1.64%	42.17%
Brescia	29,682 43.46%	31,473 46.09%	6,034 8.84%	1,102 1.61%	47.58%
Monza	19,484 46.46%	15,999 38.15%	5,841 13.93%	616 1.47%	43.80%
Bergamo	17,256 41.29%	18,506 44.28%	5,233 12.52%	798 1.91%	45.16%
Como	12,525 49.24%	9,252 36.38%	3,328 13.08%	330 1.30%	36.26%
Varese	15,194 56.12%	8,804 32.52%	2,758 10.19%	318 1.17%	42.05%
Pavia	10,944 45.97%	9,708 40.78%	2,723 11.44%	430 1.81%	40.76%
Cremona	10,989 48.20%	9,319 40.87%	2,041 8.95%	450 1.97%	42.09%
Mantua	5,938 39.29%	7,488 49.55%	1,421 9.40%	265 1.75%	39.89%
Lecco	8,723 50.69%	6,226 36.18%	2,023 11.76%	236 1.37%	45.75%
Lodi	7,263 48.30%	6,211 41.31%	1,435 9.54%	127 0.84%	44.40%
Sondrio	3,718 52.02%	2,704 37.83%	661 9.25%	64 0.90%	40.33%

=== Elected councillors ===
Constituency	Party	Member	Individual votes
Lombardy (at-large)	Lega	Attilio Fontana (Note: As president of the region.)	—N/a
Lombardy (at-large)	PD	Pierfrancesco Majorino	—N/a
Milan	PD	Paolo Romano	9,226
Milan	PD	Carlo Borghetti	6,675
Milan	PD	Pietro Bussolati	6,334
Milan	PD	Alfredo Negri	5,661
Milan	PD	Carmela Rozza	5,345
Milan	PD	Paola Bocci	5,324
Milan	FdI	Christian Garavaglia	10,329
Milan	FdI	Marco Alparone	7,796
Milan	FdI	Franco Lucente	6,685
Milan	FdI	Vittorio Feltri	6,076
Milan	FdI	Chiara Valcepina	5,464
Milan	FdI	Matteo Forte	5,229
Milan	Lega	Silvia Scurati	4,081
Milan	Lega	Riccardo Pase	3,762
Milan	PC	Michela Palestra	3,960
Milan	PC	Luca Paladini	3,790
Milan	M5S	Nicola Di Marco	1,516
Milan	M5S	Paola Pizzighini	753
Milan	FI	Gianluca Comazzi	7,902
Milan	AVS	Onorio Rosati	2,038
Milan	LI	Carmelo Ferraro	1,200
Milan	NM	Vittorio Sgarbi	873
Milan	LM	Manfredi Palmeri	1,129
Milan	A–IV	Lisa Noja	3,246

Constituency	Party	Member	Individual votes
Brescia	FdI	Carlo Bravo	7,056
Brescia	FdI	Barbara Mazzali	6,738
Brescia	FdI	Diego Invernici	5,548
Brescia	PD	Emilio Del Bono	35,761
Brescia	PD	Miriam Cominelli	10,042
Brescia	Lega	Floriano Massardi	10,485
Brescia	Lega	Davide Caparini	9,196
Brescia	FI	Simona Tironi	8,671
Brescia	A–IV	Massimo Vizzardi	3,014
Brescia	M5S	Paola Pollini	402
Bergamo	FdI	Paolo Franco	8,399
Bergamo	FdI	Lara Magoni	8,013
Bergamo	FdI	Michele Schiavi	6,638
Bergamo	PD	Davide Casati	14,776
Bergamo	PD	Jacopo Scandella	6,632
Bergamo	Lega	Giovanni Malanchini	5,831
Bergamo	Lega	Roberto Anelli	3,762
Bergamo	FI	Jonathan Lobati	5,284
Bergamo	LM	Ivan Rota	598
Monza and Brianza	FdI	Federico Romani	5,123
Monza and Brianza	FdI	Alessia Villa	4,506
Monza and Brianza	PD	Luigi Ponti	4,440
Monza and Brianza	Lega	Alessandro Corbetta	6,406
Monza and Brianza	FI	Fabrizio Figini	5,172
Monza and Brianza	LM	Martina Sassoli	502
Monza and Brianza	LI	Jacopo Dozio	93

Constituency	Party	Member	Individual votes
Varese	FdI	Giuseppe Martignoni	3,269
Varese	FdI	Francesca Caruso	2,938
Varese	PD	Samuele Astuti	8,396
Varese	Lega	Emanuele Monti	6,456
Varese	LI	Giacomo Cosentino	1,304
Varese	LM	Luca Ferrazzi	477
Varese	A–IV	Giuseppe Licata	1,464
Como	Lega	Alessandro Fermi	13,883
Como	FdI	Anna Dotti	3,422
Como	PD	Angelo Orsenigo	5,453
Como	FI	Sergio Gaddi	1,804
Como	LI	Marisa Cesana	634
Pavia	FdI	Claudio Mangiarotti	5,466
Pavia	Lega	Elena Lucchini	7,680
Pavia	FI	Ruggero Invernizzi	3,228
Pavia	LI	Alessandro Cantoni	434
Cremona	FdI	Marcello Maria Ventura	2,525
Cremona	PD	Matteo Piloni	5,566
Cremona	Lega	Filippo Bongiovanni	1,907
Lecco	FdI	Giacomo Zamperini	2,632
Lecco	PD	Gianmario Fragomeli	4,442
Lecco	Lega	Mauro Piazza	5,695
Mantua	FdI	Alessandro Beduschi	6,032
Mantua	PD	Marco Carra	5,696
Mantua	Lega	Alessandra Cappellari	4,599
Lodi	FdI	Patrizia Baffi	2,647
Lodi	PD	Roberta Valacchi	3,150
Sondrio	Lega	Massimo Sertori	7,907
