= Federico Romani =

Italian politician (born 1983)

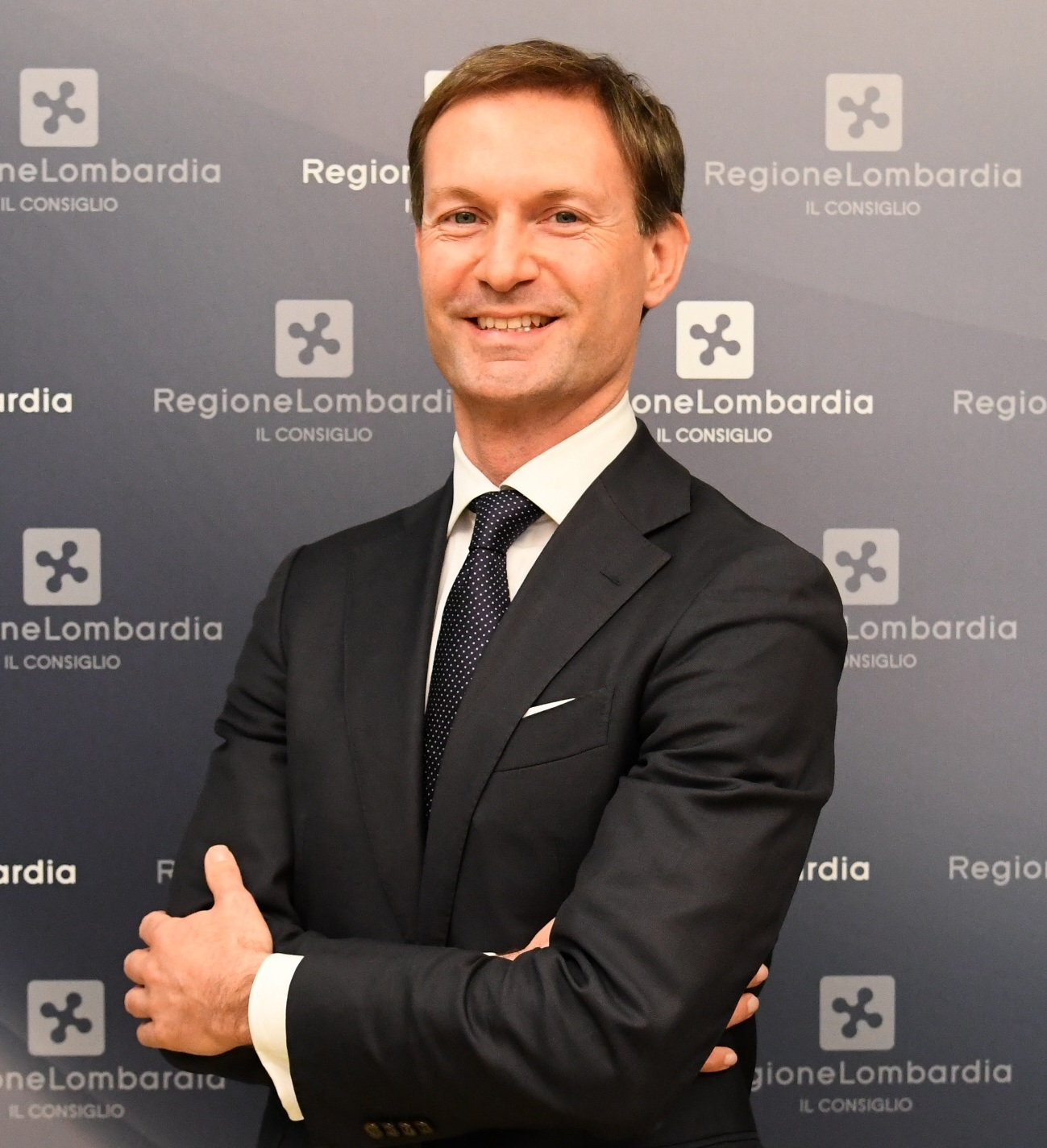
- Romani in 2023

President of the Regional Council of Lombardy
- Incumbent
- Assumed office 15 March 2023
- Preceded by: Alessandro Fermi

Personal details
- Born: 10 February 1983 (age 43)
- Party: Brothers of Italy (since 2020)

Federico Romani (born 10 February 1983) is an Italian politician serving as a member of the Regional Council of Lombardy since 2018. He has served as president of the council since 2023.
