= Guido Guidesi =

Italian politician (born 1979)

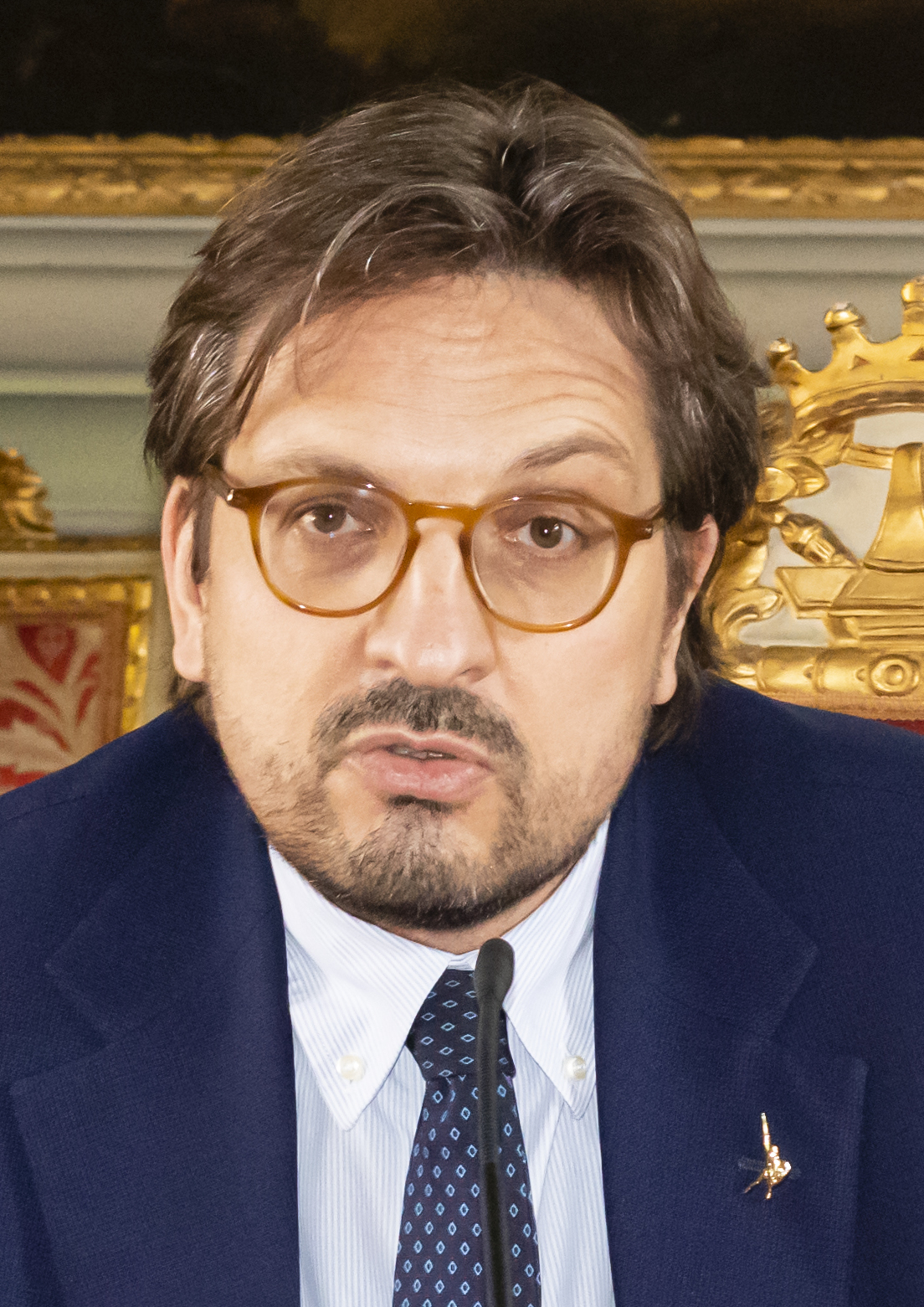
- Guidesi in 2021

Regional assessor for Economic development of Lombardy
- Incumbent
- Assumed office 8 January 2021
- President: Attilio Fontana

Member of the Chamber of Deputies
- In office 5 June 2013 – 17 February 2021
- Succeeded by: Matteo Micheli
- Constituency: Lombardy 3 (2013–2018); Lombardy 4 – P01 (2018–2021)

Personal details
- Born: 6 January 1979 (age 47) Codogno, Lombardy, Italy
- Party: Lega

Guido Guidesi (born 6 January 1979) is an Italian politician serving as assessor for economic development of Lombardy since 2021. From 2013 to 2021, he was a member of the Chamber of Deputies. From 2018 to 2019, he served as undersecretary to the Presidency of the Council of Ministers.
