= Popular Movement (Italy) =

The Popular Movement (Movimento Popolare) was an Italian political organization within the Christian Democracy (DC) party.

It was founded in 1975 by Roberto Formigoni and other members of the Catholic group Communion and Liberation. It ceased activity at the time of the demise of the DC party in 1992–94. Most of its members followed Formigoni into the United Christian Democrats (CDU) in 1995.
