= Lisa Noja =

Italian politician (born 1974)

Member of the Chamber of Deputies
- In office 23 March 2018 – 12 October 2022
- Constituency: Lombardy 1 – P04

Personal details
- Born: 15 March 1974 (age 52)
- Party: Italia Viva (since 2019)

Lisa Noja (born 15 March 1974) is an Italian politician serving as a member of the Regional Council of Lombardy since 2023. From 2018 to 2022, she was a member of the Chamber of Deputies.
