= Roberto Mariani (politician) =

Italian politician (born 1965)

President of the Province of Cremona
- Incumbent
- Assumed office 30 September 2024
- Preceded by: Paolo Mirko Signoroni

Mayor of Stagno Lombardo
- Incumbent
- Assumed office 6 June 2014
- Preceded by: Donatella Mazzeo
- In office 31 January 1994 – 14 June 2004
- Preceded by: Antonio Biffi
- Succeeded by: Donatella Mazzeo

President of the Provincial Council of Cremona
- In office 21 July 2004 – 8 June 2009

Personal details
- Born: 22 August 1965 (age 61) Cremona, Italy
- Party: PCI (until 1991); PDS (1991–1998); DS (1998–2007); PD (since 2007)

Roberto Mariani (born 22 August 1965) is an Italian politician serving as president of the Province of Cremona since 2024. He has also served as mayor of Stagno Lombardo since 2014, having previously held the office from 1994 to 2004.

== Career ==
Mariani entered politics in 1990 as a municipal councillor in Stagno Lombardo for the Italian Communist Party, and subsequently continued his political activity with the Democratic Party of the Left and the Democrats of the Left. He was elected mayor in 1994 and was re-elected in 1995 and in 1999.

In 2004, Mariani was elected to the Provincial Council of Cremona and subsequently served as its president until 2009.

He returned to the office of mayor of Stagno Lombardo in 2014, when he was elected with the civic list Idee in Comune, receiving 36.99% of the vote.

In September 2024, Mariani was elected president of the Province of Cremona as the candidate for the Democratic Party and the centre-left coalition, winning against Alberto Sisti, mayor of Castelvisconti, with 46,301 weighted votes (56.06%).
