= List of presidents of the Province of Cremona =

President of the Province of Cremona
- Presidente della Provincia di Cremona
- Incumbent; Roberto Mariani since 30 September 2024
- Term length: 4 years
- Inaugural holder: Giuseppe Zaccaria
- Formation: 1889

The president of the Province of Cremona is the head of the provincial government in Cremona, Lombardy, Italy. The president oversees the administration of the province, coordinates the activities of the municipalities, and represents the province in regional and national matters.

Since September 2024, the office has been held by Roberto Mariani of the Democratic Party.

== List ==
=== Presidents of the Provincial Deputation (1889–1929) ===
No.	Portrait	Name	Term		Party
No.	Portrait	Name	Start	End	Party
1		Giuseppe Zaccaria	1889	31 December 1894	?
2		Alfonso Barinetti	1 January 1895	31 December 1898	?
3		Giuliano Sacchi	1 January 1899	31 December 1901	?
4		Nicola Coboldi	1 January 1902	11 August 1902	?
5		Giambattista Marchesi	16 October 1902	31 December 1904	?
6		Ettore Signori	1 January 1905	31 December 1914	?
7		Alberto Barni	1 January 1915	31 December 1919	?
8		Mario Sardelli	1 January 1920	28 October 1922	?
–		Pietro Montanari	1922	1922	Special commissioner
–		Antonio Martani	1922	1923	Special commissioner
9		Adelchi Barbieri	8 April 1923	22 December 1924	National Fascist Party
10		Pietro Montanari	22 December 1924	2 May 1926	National Fascist Party
11		Stefano Foletti	2 May 1926	4 March 1929	National Fascist Party

=== Presidents of the Provincial Rectorate (1929–1945) ===
No.	Portrait	Name	Term		Party
No.	Portrait	Name	Start	End	Party
1		Francesco Rossi	2 August 1929	30 March 1933	National Fascist Party
1		Francesco Rossi	30 March 1933	8 April 1937	National Fascist Party
1		Francesco Rossi	8 April 1937	1943	National Fascist Party
–		Francesco Gambazzi	1944	25 April 1945	Prefectural commissioner

=== Presidents of the Provincial Deputation (1945–1951) ===
No.	Portrait	Name	Term		Party
No.	Portrait	Name	Start	End	Party
–		Alfredo Galletti	25 April 1945	12 July 1945	Independent
1		Alfredo Galletti	12 July 1945	8 March 1946	Independent
2		Ennio Zelioli-Lanzini	8 March 1946	15 March 1948	Christian Democracy
–		Ettore Brugnelli (acting)	15 March 1948	17 May 1948	?
3		Giuseppe Ghisalberti	17 May 1948	1951	Christian Democracy

=== Presidents of the Province (1951–present) ===
No.	Portrait	Name	Term		Party
No.	Portrait	Name	Start	End	Party
1		Giuseppe Ghisalberti	1951	1970	Christian Democracy
2		Martino Manfredi	1970	1975	Christian Democracy
3		Franco Dolci	1975	1980	Italian Communist Party
4		Renzo Rebecchi	1980	1985	Christian Democracy
5		Secondo Piazza	1985	1988	Christian Democracy
6		Vittorio Foderaro	1988	3 August 1990	Christian Democracy
7		Gian Carlo Corada	3 August 1990	8 May 1995	Democratic Party of the Left; Democrats of the Left
7		Gian Carlo Corada	8 May 1995	28 June 1999	Democratic Party of the Left; Democrats of the Left
7		Gian Carlo Corada	28 June 1999	28 June 2004	Democratic Party of the Left; Democrats of the Left
8		Giuseppe Torchio	28 June 2004	8 June 2009	The Daisy; Democratic Party
9		Massimiliano Salini	8 June 2009	21 July 2014	The People of Freedom
–		Gianluca Pinotti	21 July 2014	30 October 2014	Special commissioner
10		Carlo Vezzini	30 October 2014	7 November 2016	Democratic Party
11		Davide Viola	7 November 2016	26 May 2019	Civic list
–		Rosolino Azzali (acting)	26 May 2019	25 August 2019	Civic list
12		Paolo Mirko Signoroni	25 August 2019	3 October 2019	Civic list
–		Rosolino Azzali (acting)	3 October 2019	23 November 2019	Civic list
(12)		Paolo Mirko Signoroni	23 November 2019	30 September 2024	Civic list
13		Roberto Mariani	30 September 2024	Incumbent	Democratic Party

== Sources ==
- "Storia amministrativa dell'ente". Ministero dell'Interno.
- Menichini, Piera (2005). "I presidenti delle Province dall'Unità alla Grande guerra: repertorio analitico". Storia Amministrazione Costituzione (13): 245–246.
