= Roberto Formigoni =

Italian politician (born 1947)

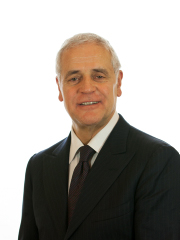

President of Lombardy
- In office 27 June 1995 – 18 March 2013
- Preceded by: Paolo Arrigoni
- Succeeded by: Roberto Maroni

Member of the Senate of the Republic
- In office 15 March 2013 – 22 March 2018
- Constituency: Lombardy

Member of the Chamber of Deputies
- In office 2 July 1987 – 27 June 1995
- Constituency: Milan

Member of the European Parliament for North-West Italy
- In office 24 July 1984 – 6 May 1993

Personal details
- Born: 30 March 1947 (age 79) Lecco, Lombardy, Italy
- Party: Ncl (since 2017)
- Other political affiliations: DC (1973–1994); PPI (1994–1995); CDU (1995–1998); CDL (1998–2001); FI (2001–2009); PdL (2009–2013); NCD (2013–2017); AP (2017)
- Height: 1.88 m (6 ft 2 in)
- Education: Università Cattolica del Sacro Cuore
- Profession: Politician, Communion and Liberation movement's former unofficial political spokesman

Roberto Formigoni (born 30 March 1947) is an Italian politician. He was the president of Lombardy from 1995 to 2013. He is the former unofficial political spokesperson of the Communion and Liberation movement. On 21 February 2019, the Supreme Court of Cassation, the highest court in Italy, found him guilty of corruption and sentenced him to a definitive jail term of 5 years and 10 months. As a result, he was detained in the prison of Bollate, near Milan, for a few months in 2019 before getting house arrest. He was released in November 2023.

== Career ==
Born in Lecco in the Lombardy region, Formigoni began his political career early in Christian Democracy through youth movements, such as Gioventù Studentesca and Communion and Liberation, of which he became the unofficial political spokesman. In 1976, he founded the Popular Movement and was elected a deputy in both the European Parliament (with over 450,000 votes) and Italian Parliament. He was also the vice-president of the European Parliament for five years and served as undersecretary of state for the Ministry of the Environment in the Italian government.

In 1990, Formigoni garnered attention when he was involved in a mission to Iraq that successfully concluded with the freeing of some Italian technicians who were hostages of the local government. He later took part in the oil-for-food programme for Iraq, buying 1,000,000 oil barrels (160,000 cubic metres). The move sparked controversy and linked him to alleged bribe scandals. In 1995, he and Rocco Buttiglione founded the United Christian Democrats party. In 1998, he moved to Forza Italia, when Buttiglione briefly decided to support the government of Massimo D'Alema.

In 1995, Formigoni was elected president of Lombardy. Leftist groups opposed his centre-right platform. Formigoni was re-elected in 2000 carrying over 62% of the approximately 3.5 million votes, and in 2005 with almost 54% of the approximately 2.8 million votes. He was elected to a fourth term in March 2010 with 56% of the approximately 2.7 million votes. His candidature had been contested by academics and left-wing politicians, as in disregard of Law no. 165/2004, which put a limit of two consecutive mandates to directly elected regional presidents. Formigoni was indirectly elected in 1995 but then directly elected in 2000 and 2005. He defended himself, stating that the law was not in vigour when he was first directly elected in 2000, so he should be allowed a fourth mandate. According to some scholars, his mandate could have been overturned by judges later on.

== Controversies ==
Formigoni candidated the Italian showgirl Nicole Minetti and dental hygienist of the former Italian Prime Minister Silvio Berlusconi, who asked for a political seat for her, and this was contested by Italian newspapers. On 16 October 2012, Formigoni announced the dissolution of the regional legislature after one of his commissioners, Domenico Zambetti of the People of Freedom, was arrested on accusations he bought votes from the 'Ndrangheta in 2010 and extorted favours and public building contracts, including construction tenders for the World Expo 2015 in Milan.

== Italian court sentences against Formigoni ==
=== 2000s: Bribery and environmental pollution ===
In 2002, Formigoni was judged for bribery due the landfill in Cerro Maggiore. In December 2009, Formigoni was tried illegal environmental pollution.

=== 2010s: Freemasonry, criminal association, and defamatory behavior against Italian judges ===
Formigoni was interrogated by Italian Court in Rome due the Propaganda Due (P2) Freemasonry group. In July 2012, he was sentenced to 1 year of imprisonment due defamation. In January 2014, he was convicted of defaming the Italian judge, Alfredo Robledo.

On 25 July 2012, Formigoni was convicted of bribery by Italian courts. On 12 February 2013, he was investigated due criminal group activities. On 3 March 2014, Formigoni was convicted for criminal association activities and bribery. On 15 April 2016, the prosecution asked to sentence Formigoni to 9 years of prison and described him as a "boss of criminal group" due his tactical bribery attitudes that lasted more than 10 years while he managed more than 70 million euro public money.

== See also ==
- 1995 Lombard regional election
- 2000 Lombard regional election
- 2005 Lombard regional election
- 2010 Lombard regional election
- Advocacy group
- Corruption in Italy
