= Elena Lucchini =

Italian politician (born 1984)

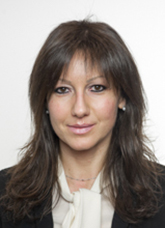
- Lucchini in 2018

Member of the Chamber of Deputies
- In office 23 March 2018 – 12 October 2022
- Constituency: Lombardy 4 – 01

Personal details
- Born: 1 April 1984 (age 42)
- Party: Lega

Elena Lucchini (born 1 April 1984) is an Italian politician serving as assessor for family, social solidarity, disability, and equal opportunities of Lombardy since 2022. From 2018 to 2022, she was a member of the Chamber of Deputies.
