= Attilio Fontana =

Italian politician from Varese, Lombardy

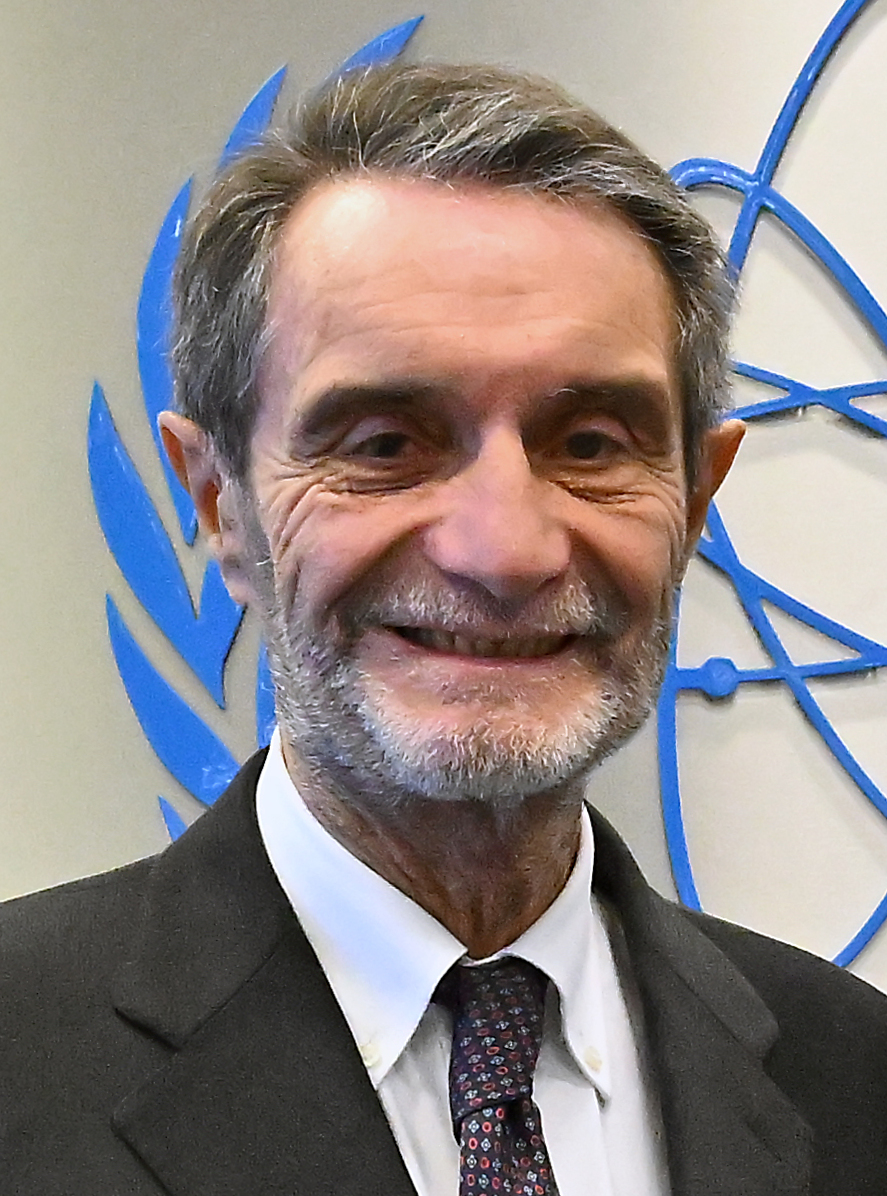
- Fontana in 2025

President of Lombardy
- Incumbent
- Assumed office 26 March 2018
- Deputy: See list: Fabrizio Sala (2018–2021) Letizia Moratti (2021–2022) Fabrizio Sala (2022–2023) Melania Rizzoli (2023) Marco Alparone (since 2023)
- Preceded by: Roberto Maroni

Mayor of Varese
- In office 29 May 2006 – 21 June 2016
- Preceded by: Aldo Fumagalli
- Succeeded by: Davide Galimberti

Personal details
- Born: 28 March 1952 (age 74) Varese, Italy
- Party: Lega Lombarda (since 1984)
- Height: 1.75 m (5 ft 9 in)
- Spouse(s): Laura Castelli (div.); Roberta Dini
- Children: 3
- Education: University of Milan
- Profession: Lawyer

Attilio Fontana (born 28 March 1952) is an Italian politician from Varese, Lombardy. He has served as President of Lombardy since 2018, leading a centre-right coalition.

== Biography ==
=== Early political career ===
A long-time member of Lega Lombarda and Lega Nord (LN), he was mayor of Induno Olona from 1995 to 1999. Fontana, with LN, was elected in the 2000 regional election and 2005 regional election to the Regional Council of Lombardy, of which he functioned as president until July 2006.

=== Mayor of Varese ===
Fontana stepped down from that office after being elected mayor of Varese with 57.8% of the vote in the first round of 28 May 2006. He was re-elected in May 2011 with 53.8% of the vote in a run-off. Fontana, ineligible to run for reelection due to term limits, left the office in June 2016.

In 2007, Fontana was the lawyer of Andrea Mascetti in the case against the left-wing journalist and television host Michele Santoro, for whom they won: with this court case, Fontana obtained notoriety at the national level.

=== 2018 presidential election ===
==== Speculation ====
Some journalists in July 2016 speculated about a nomination of Fontana as LN candidate in the 2018 election for President of Lombardy if the incumbent Governor (President of Region) Roberto Maroni – who was elected in the 2013 regional election for a five-year term with the support of Lega Lombarda and Lega Nord, the parties of Maroni and Fontana, and with the support of the other parties members of the 2013 centre-right coalition – would not run for a second consecutive (and final) term. In January 2018, when Maroni announced his retirement from politics, Fontana was selected as the centre-right coalition (composed of FI, LN, FdI, EpL, NcI and his civic personal list named "Fontana List" composed of members of PP, RC, MNS and also by civic, independent and non-partisan members) candidate for the presidency of Lombardy. For the media, his experience as Mayor and Salvini's popularity are among the strengths of his candidacy.

==== General election ====
On 15 January 2018, Fontana stated that the Western culture was in danger due to the migration flows from Africa. This created many protests as well as criticisms from the centre-left Democratic Party (PD) and the big tent anti-establishment Five Star Movement (M5S). Because of the controversy he apologized for his remarks, declaring that it was a slip of the tongue and an expressive error, not due to inherent racism of him or his party. Fontana's principal rivals were Giorgio Gori (PD) and Dario Violi (M5S).

On 4 March 2018 Fontana won 50% against Gori (29%) and Violi (17%) in the regional election. Fontana was sworn into office as governor on 26 March.

=== Presidency of Lombardy (2018–present) ===
In October 2018, Fontana blocked, with his legal authority as Lombardy president, a Muslim association from turning a former hospital chapel into a mosque. In September 2020, a few weeks after the 2020 constitutional referendum on the cut in the number of parliamentarians linked to the reform initiated by the Conte I Cabinet led by the League with M5S and concluded by the Conte II Cabinet led by the coalition between M5S and PD, Fontana announced his vote against, in dissent with the official line of the League (established by Salvini), which was lined up for the "Yes".

==== Suspicion of abuse of power ====
In May 2019, the Prosecutor Office of Milan started an investigation on Fontana due to abuse of power as president of Lombardy in a case of corruption, but in March 2020 all the accusations fell and the case was definitively closed as the appointment in question did not constitute a crime.

==== Suspicion of fraud in public supplies ====
In July 2020 another investigation started, following the activities of Fontana, his wife and his brother in law during the COVID-19 pandemic. Some journalists in September 2020 speculated a retirement of Fontana from politics in 2023 - similar to Maroni's retirement in 2018 - in favour of Giancarlo Giorgetti or an early election due to the media hype due to the "Covid investigation", but Matteo Salvini (the Federal Secretary of Lega) prevented the resignation of Fontana from the presidency of Lombardy and an early election.

On 2 December 2021, the Milan Public Prosecutor's Office requested the indictment of Fontana, for the crime of fraud in public supplies, after he had renounced being questioned by the investigators. On 13 May 2022 he was acquitted by the Milan GUP together with four other suspects (including his brother-in-law) because the fact does not exist.

==== Suspicion of self-laundering and misrepresentation ====
In March 2021, Fontana was entered in the register of suspects of the Milan Public Prosecutor's Office for self-laundering and false declaration in voluntary disclosure in reference to a suspected movement of money between Italy and Switzerland which took place starting from 2015. In February 2022, the case was closed; for the investigating judge of Milan, there were not enough elements to support the accusation against Fontana.

Political offices
Preceded by Aldo Fumagalli (LN)	Mayor of Varese; 2006–2016	Succeeded by Davide Galimberti (PD)
Preceded by Roberto Maroni (LN)	President of Lombardy; 2018–present	Succeeded by Incumbent
Party political offices
Preceded by Roberto Maroni (LN); 2013	Centre-right coalition nominee for President of Lombardy; 2018 and 2023	Succeeded by Most recent (party); 2028
Preceded by Aldo Fumagalli (LN); 2002	Centre-right coalition nominee for Mayor of Varese; 2006 and 2011	Succeeded by Paolo Orrigoni (FI); 2016
