= 2010 Lombard regional election =

- 28–29 March 2010

All 80 seats to the Regional Council of Lombardy
- Turnout: 64.64% (▼8.33%)
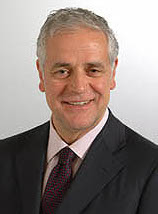

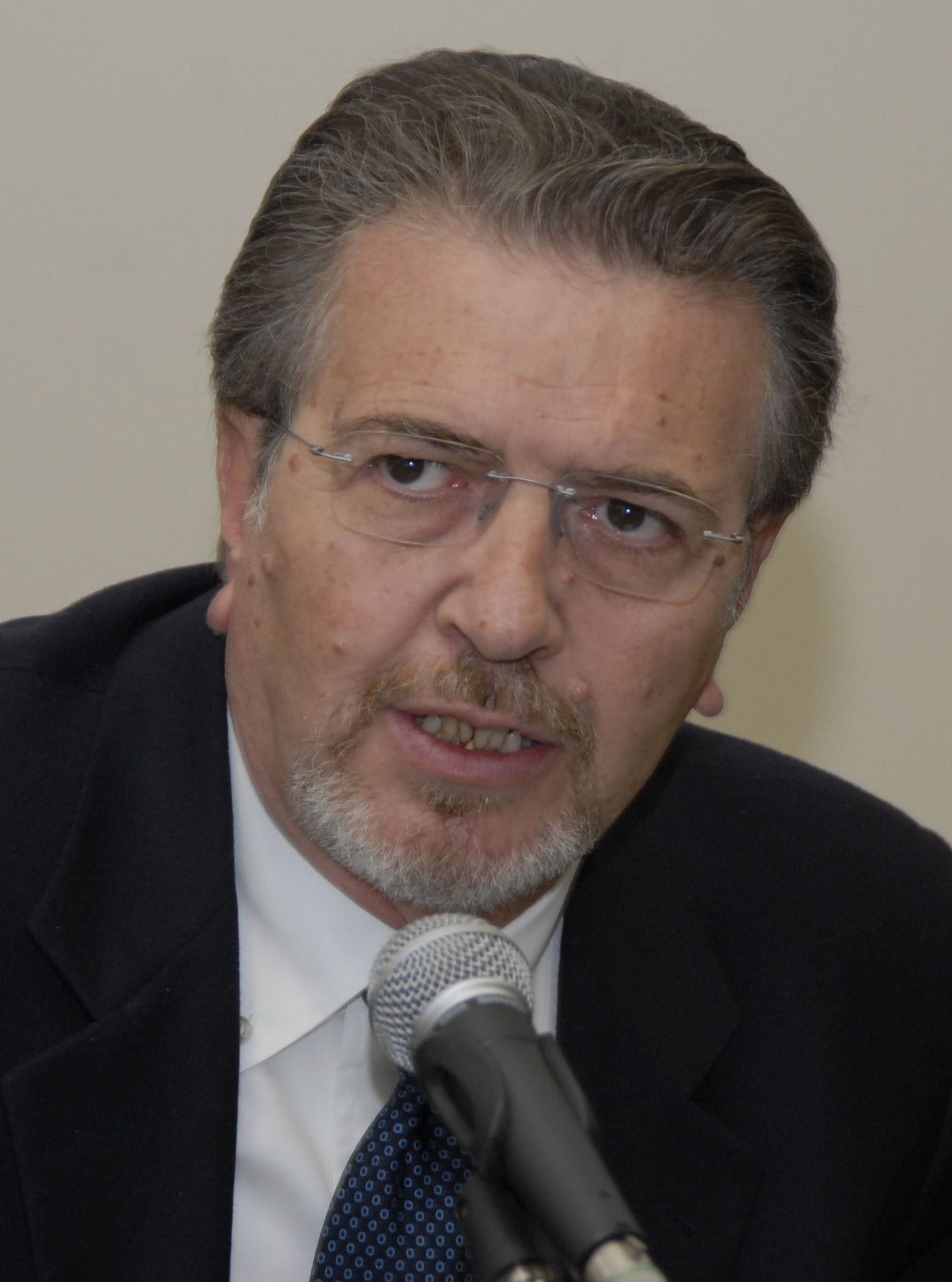
	Majority party	Minority party
Leader	Roberto Formigoni	Filippo Penati
Party	People of Freedom	Democratic Party
Alliance	Centre-right	Centre-left
Last election	52 seats, 53.9%	28 seats, 43.2%
Seats won	49	28
Seat change	▼3	Steady
Popular vote	2,704,057	1,603,674
Percentage	56.1%	33.3%
Swing	▲2.2%	▼9.9%
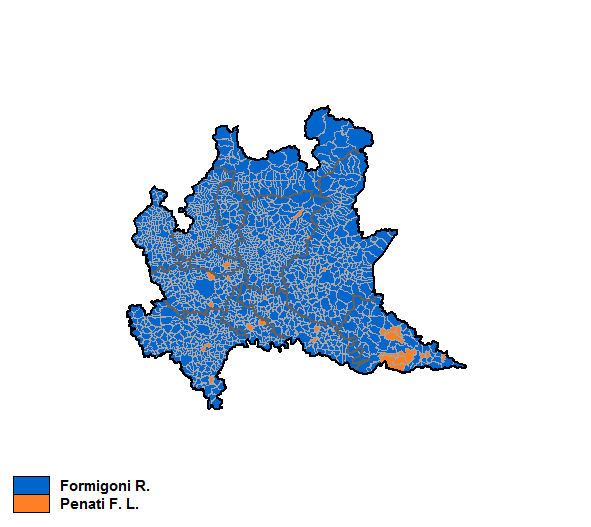
President before election
Roberto Formigoni
FI/PdL
President-elect
Roberto Formigoni
PdL

The 2010 Lombard regional election took place on 28–29 March 2010. The 9th term of the Regional Council was chosen.

Roberto Formigoni, who was the longest-serving President of Region in Italy along with Giancarlo Galan of Veneto, obtained a historic fourth consecutive term. His opponent was Filippo Penati, a Democrat, who was President of the Province of Milan from 2004 to 2009. The Lombard League, that is to say the regional section of Northern League in Lombardy, backed Formigoni in return of the support granted by The People of Freedom to Northern League candidates in Veneto (Luca Zaia) and Piedmont (Roberto Cota).

Minor candidates who were running were Savino Pezzotta for the Union of the Centre, Vito Crimi for Beppe Grillo's movement, Vittorio Agnoletto for the Communist Refoundation Party and Gianmario Invernizzi for New Force. Marco Cappato for the Italian Radicals did not gain enough signatures to back his candidature.

== Electoral system ==
Regional elections in Lombardy were ruled by the "Tatarella law" (approved in 1995), which provided for a mixed electoral system: four fifths of the regional councilors were elected in provincial constituencies by proportional representation, using the largest remainder method with a droop quota and open lists, while the residual votes and the unassigned seats were grouped into a "single regional constituency", where the whole ratios and the highest remainders were divided with the Hare method among the provincial party lists; one fifth of the council seats instead was reserved for regional lists and assigned with a majoritarian system: the leader of the regional list that scored the highest number of votes was elected to the presidency of the Region while the other candidates were elected regional councilors.

A threshold of 3% had been established for the provincial lists, which, however, could still have entered the regional council if the regional list to which they were connected had scored at least 5% of valid votes.

The panachage was also allowed: the voter can indicate a candidate for the presidency but prefer a provincial list connected to another candidate.

== Council apportionment ==
According to the official 2001 Italian census, the 64 Council seats which must be covered by proportional representation are so distributed between Lombard provinces.

BG	BS	CO	CR	LC	LO	MN	MI	MB	PV	SO	VA	total
7	8	4	2	2	1	3	21	5	4	1	6	64

The allocation is not fixed. Remaining seats and votes after proportional distribution, are all grouped at regional level and divided by party lists. The consequent division of these seats at provincial level usually change the original apportionment. Only 43 seats were directly assigned at provincial level, and the final distribution between provinces changed in this way.

BG	BS	CO	CR	LC	LO	MN	MI	PV	SO	VA	total
+2	+2	=	=	+1	=	=	+2	-1	+1	=	+7

As it can be seen, the landslide victory of Formigoni's Alliance caused the distribution of seven more seats to the oppositions at provincial level. Bergamo and Brescia received two new seats, Lecco and Milan and Sondrio one each.

== Controversies on Formigoni's candidature ==
Formigoni's candidature, which allowed him a 4th mandate, has been contested by academics and left-wing politicians, as in disregard of Law n. 165/2004, that put a limit of two subsequent mandates to directly-elected Region Presidents. Formigoni was indirectly elected in 1995, but then directly elected in 2000 and 2005. He defends himself stating that the law was not in action when he was first directly elected in 2000, so he should be allowed a 4th mandate. After re-election, his mandate may be overturned by judges later on.

Formigoni also sparked controversies when agreeing to put in his majority-premium list, granting her safe election, Nicole Minetti, former showgirl and actual dental hygienist of Silvio Berlusconi, who asked for a political seat for her.

== Parties and candidates ==
Political party or alliance	Constituent lists	Previous result		Candidate
Political party or alliance	Constituent lists	Votes (%)	Seats	Candidate
Centre-right coalition	The People of Freedom	34.6	23	Roberto Formigoni
Centre-right coalition	Northern League	15.8	11	Roberto Formigoni
Centre-right coalition	The Right	—N/a	—N/a	Roberto Formigoni
Centre-left coalition	Democratic Party	27.1	19	Filippo Penati
Centre-left coalition	Federation of the Greens	2.9	2	Filippo Penati
Centre-left coalition	Pensioners' Party	2.6	1	Filippo Penati
Centre-left coalition	Italy of Values	1.4	1	Filippo Penati
Centre-left coalition	Left Ecology Freedom	—N/a	—N/a	Filippo Penati
Centre-left coalition	Italian Socialist Party	—N/a	—N/a	Filippo Penati
Federation of the Left (incl. PRC and PdCI)		8.0	4	Vittorio Agnoletto
Union of the Centre		3.8	2	Savino Pezzotta
Five Star Movement		—N/a	—N/a	Vito Crimi
New Force		—N/a	—N/a	Gianmario Invernizzi

== Results ==
The election led to the return to the guide of the Region, for its fourth consecutive term, Communion and Liberation's Roberto Formigoni, supported by the centre-right coalition.

If the mechanisms of electoral law generated a Regional Council very similar to the incumbent one speaking about coalitions, the most relevant change was the five new seats conquered by the League, which obtained its best performance ever. More, the League was strangely penalized by the electoral law, having conquered fewer seats than as it would be with a proportional representation.

The People of Freedom was confirmed as the largest party in the region with 32% of the vote, despite a decline of three points, while Lega Nord took the 26% and Democratic Party the 23%.

28–29 March 2010 Lombard regional election results
Candidates	Votes	%	Seats	Parties	Votes	%	Seat
Roberto Formigoni	2,704,364	56.11	8				
Roberto Formigoni	2,704,364	56.11	8	The People of Freedom	1,355,133	31.79	23
Roberto Formigoni	2,704,364	56.11	8	Northern League – Lombard League	1,117,227	26.21	18
Roberto Formigoni	2,704,364	56.11	8	The Right	7,008	0.16	–
Roberto Formigoni	2,704,364	56.11	8	Total	2,479,368	58.16	41
Filippo Penati	1,603,666	33.27	1				
Filippo Penati	1,603,666	33.27	1	Democratic Party	976,215	22.90	21
Filippo Penati	1,603,666	33.27	1	Italy of Values	267,954	6.29	4
Filippo Penati	1,603,666	33.27	1	Pensioners' Party	69,932	1.64	1
Filippo Penati	1,603,666	33.27	1	Left Ecology Freedom	59,112	1.39	1
Filippo Penati	1,603,666	33.27	1	Federation of the Greens	35,060	0.82	–
Filippo Penati	1,603,666	33.27	1	Italian Socialist Party	13,415	0.31	–
Filippo Penati	1,603,666	33.27	1	Total	1,421,688	33.35	27
Savino Pezzotta	225,849	4.69	–	Union of the Centre	164,078	3.85	3
Vito Crimi	144,585	3.00	–	Five Star Movement	99,390	2.33	–
Vittorio Agnoletto	113,754	2.36	–	Federation of the Left	87,221	2.05	–
Gianmario Invernizzi	27,358	0.57	–	New Force	11,281	0.26	–
Total candidates	4,819,576	100.00	9	Total parties	4,263,026	100.00	71
Source: Ministry of the Interior – Historical Archive of Elections

Popular vote (party)
PdL	31.79%
LN	26.21%
PD	22.90%
IdV	6.29%
UDC	3.85%
M5S	2.33%
FdS	2.05%
Others	4.58%

President
Formigoni	56.11%
Penati	33.27%
Pezzotta	4.69%
Crimi	3.00%
Agnoletto	2.36%
Invernizzi	0.57%

=== Results by province ===
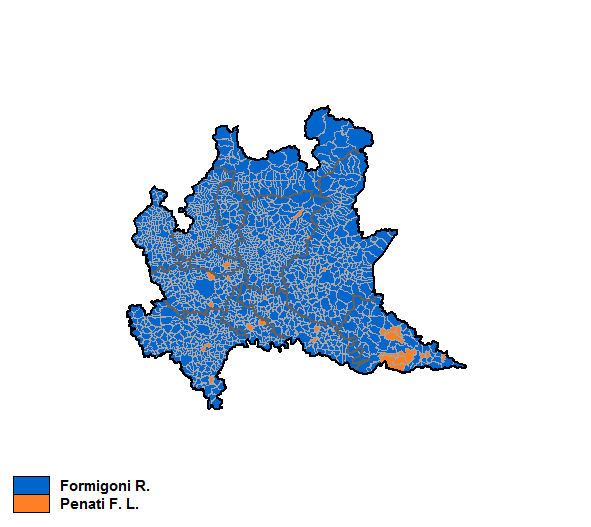
Election results map. Orange denotes municipalities won by Penati and Blue denotes those won by Formigoni.

Province	Roberto Formigoni	Filippo Penati	Savino Pezzotta	Vito Crimi	Vittorio Agnoletto	Gianmario Invernizzi
Milan	741,051 (50.25%)	585,722 (39.72%)	50,421 (3.42%)	48,979 (3.32%)	41,376 (2.81%)	7,252 (0.49%)
Brescia	362,187 (58.96%)	178,958 (29.13%)	37,565 (6.11%)	19,215 (3.13%)	12,106 (1.97%)	4,310 (0.70%)
Bergamo	340,527 (61.91%)	145,273 (26.41%)	36,720 (6.68%)	14,777 (2.69%)	10,096 (1.84%)	2,672 (0.49%)
Varese	259,496 (60.51%)	125,111 (29.17%)	20,159 (4.70%)	12,748 (2.97%)	8,926 (2.08%)	2,421 (0.56%)
Monza and Brianza	240,858 (56.32%)	144,246 (33.73%)	17,802 (4.16%)	14,788 (3.46%)	7,815 (1.83%)	2,117 (0.50%)
Como	183,765 (63.41%)	79,757 (27.37%)	12,657 (4.34%)	6,490 (2.23%)	5,599 (1.92%)	2,104 (0.72%)
Pavia	156,750 (57.12%)	88,690 (32.32%)	11,715 (4.27%)	7,483 (2.73%)	7,829 (2.85%)	1,964 (0.72%)
Mantua	100,135 (49.81%)	77,311 (38.46%)	10,574 (5.26%)	6,698 (3.33%)	5,638 (2.80%)	663 (0.33%)
Cremona	99,463 (54.15%)	63,213 (34.42%)	9,520 (5.18%)	4,978 (2.71%)	5,164 (2.81%)	1,333 (0.73%)
Lecco	100,897 (57.38%)	57,861 (32.91%)	8,293 (4.72%)	4,163 (2.37%)	3,808 (2.17%)	795 (0.45%)
Lodi	59,619 (53.80%)	37,837 (34.14%)	5,451 (4.92%)	2,873 (2.59%)	3,633 (3.28%)	1,402 (1.27%)
Sondrio	58,634 (67.57%)	19,687 (22.69%)	4,972 (5.73%)	1,393 (1.61%)	1,764 (2.03%)	325 (0.37%)
