= 1975 Lombard regional election =

The 1975 Lombard regional election took place on 15 June 1975. The 2nd term of the Regional Council was chosen.

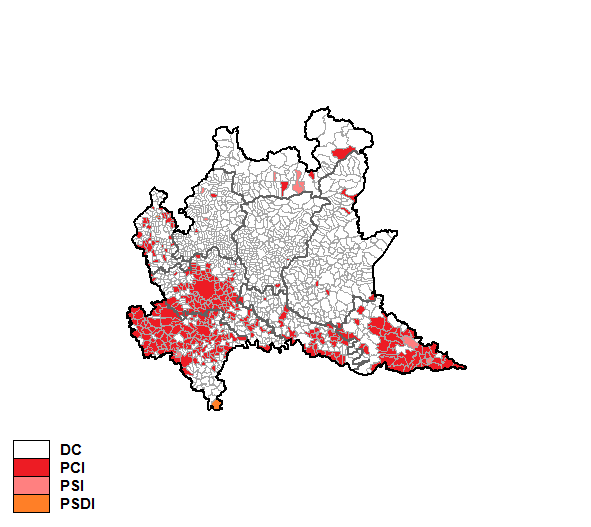
Largest party by municipality

== Electoral law ==
Election was held under proportional representation with provincial constituencies where the largest remainder method with a Droop quota was used. To ensure more proportionality, remained votes and seats were transferred at regional level and calculated at-large.

== Results ==
Despite the huge jump made by the Communist Party, which gained nearly 7 point more than five years before and won the majority of votes in Milan, the Christian Democracy party remained the largest party and incumbent president Cesare Golfari was able to form a second center-left government with the support of the PSI, the PSDI and the PRI.

15 June 1975 Lombard regional election results
Parties	Votes	%	Seats	+/-
Christian Democracy	2,182,347	37.48	32	▼4
Italian Communist Party	1,769,301	30.39	25	▲6
Italian Socialist Party	818,168	14.05	11	▲2
Italian Democratic Socialist Party	300,973	5.17	3	▼2
Italian Social Movement	263,621	4.53	3	=
Italian Republican Party	179,508	3.08	2	=
Italian Liberal Party	163,117	2.80	2	▼2
Proletarian Democracy	143,594	2.47	2	=
others	1,452	0.02	–	=
Total parties	5,822,081	100.00	80	
Invalid/blank votes	217,896			
Registered voters	6,039,977	95.04		
Source: Ministry of the Interior – Results

Popular vote
DC	37.48%
PCI	30.39%
PSI	14.05%
PSU	5.17%
MSI	4.53%
PRI	3.08%
PLI	2.80%
DP	2.47%
UFD	0.02%

=== Seats by province ===
Province	DC	PCI	PSI	PSDI	MSI	PRI	PLI	DP	Total
Milan	11	13	5	2	2	2	1	1	37
Brescia	5	2	1	1	1	-	-	-	10
Bergamo	5	2	1	-	-	-	-	1	9
Como	3	2	1	-	-	-	1	-	7
Varese	3	2	1	-	-	-	-	-	6
Pavia	2	2	1	-	-	-	-	-	5
Mantua	1	1	1	-	-	-	-	-	3
Cremona	1	1	-	-	-	-	-	-	2
Sondrio	1	-	-	-	-	-	-	-	1
Total	32	25	11	3	3	2	2	2	80
