= 1970 Lombard regional election =

The 1970 Lombard regional election took place on 7–8 June 1970. It was the first-ever regional election.

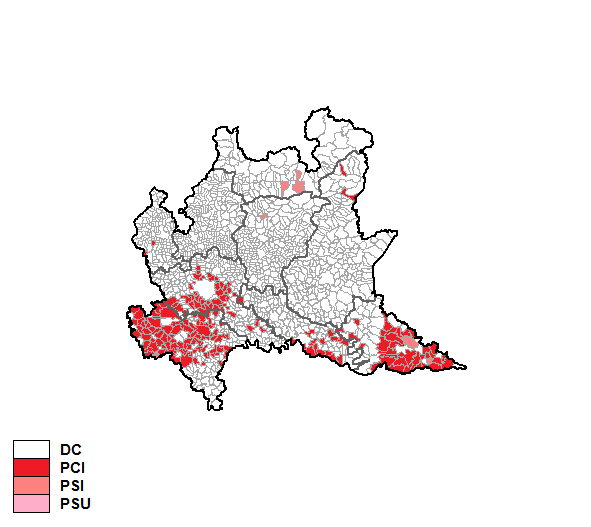
Largest party by municipality

== Electoral law ==
Election was held under proportional representation with provincial constituencies where the largest remainder method with a Droop quota was used. To ensure more proportionality, remained votes and seats were transferred at regional level and calculated at-large.

== Results ==
The Christian Democracy was by far the largest party and christian-democrat Piero Bassetti was able to form a strong center-left government with the support of the PSI, the PSU and the PRI. Bassetti was replaced by Cesare Golfari in 1974.

7 June 1970 Lombard regional election results
| Parties | Votes | % | Seats |
|---|---|---|---|
| Christian Democracy | 2,138,141 | 40.90 | 36 |
| Italian Communist Party | 1,210,068 | 23.14 | 19 |
| Italian Socialist Party | 648,696 | 12.41 | 9 |
| Unitary Socialist Party | 376,436 | 7.20 | 5 |
| Italian Liberal Party | 310,324 | 5.94 | 4 |
| Italian Social Movement | 195,791 | 3.64 | 3 |
| Italian Socialist Party of Proletarian Unity | 188,585 | 3.61 | 2 |
| Italian Republican Party | 125,767 | 2.41 | 2 |
| Italian Democratic Party of Monarchist Unity | 31,119 | 0.60 | – |
| Autonomists' Union of Italy | 3,389 | 0.06 | – |
| Total parties | 5,228,316 | 100.00 | 80 |
| Invalid/blank votes | 225,720 | 4.14 | |
| Registered voters | 5,453,931 | 95.51 | |
Source: Ministry of the Interior – Results

Popular vote
| DC | 40.90% |
| PCI | 23.14% |
| PSI | 12.41% |
| PSU | 7.20% |
| PLI | 5.94% |
| MSI | 3.64% |
| PSIUP | 3.61% |
| PRI | 2.41% |
| Others | 0.66% |

=== Seats by province ===
| Province | DC | PCI | PSI | PSU | PLI | MSI | PSIUP | PRI | Total |
|---|---|---|---|---|---|---|---|---|---|
| Milan | 12 | 9 | 4 | 3 | 3 | 2 | 1 | 1 | 35 |
| Brescia | 5 | 2 | 1 | 1 | - | 1 | 1 | - | 11 |
| Bergamo | 5 | 1 | 1 | 1 | - | - | - | - | 8 |
| Como | 4 | 1 | 1 | - | 1 | - | - | - | 7 |
| Varese | 3 | 1 | 1 | - | - | - | - | 1 | 6 |
| Mantua | 2 | 2 | 1 | - | - | - | - | - | 5 |
| Pavia | 2 | 2 | - | - | - | - | - | - | 4 |
| Cremona | 2 | 1 | - | - | - | - | - | - | 3 |
| Sondrio | 1 | - | - | - | - | - | - | - | 1 |
| Total | 36 | 19 | 9 | 5 | 4 | 3 | 2 | 2 | 80 |
