= 1985 Lombard regional election =

The 1985 Lombard regional election took place on 12 May 1985. The 4th term of the Regional Council was chosen.

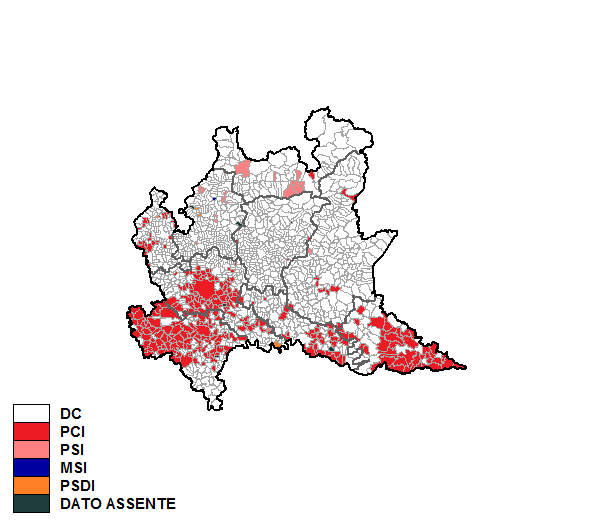
Largest party by municipality

== Electoral law ==
The election was held under proportional representation with provincial constituencies where the largest remainder method with a Droop quota was used. To ensure more proportionality, the remained votes and seats were transferred at regional level and calculated at large.

== Results ==
The Christian Democracy party was by far the largest party, despite a slight decline in term of votes. After the election Giuseppe Guzzetti was re-elected president for the third time at the head of a center-left coalition comprising also the PSI, the PSDI, the PLI and the PRI. In 1986 Guzzetti was replaced by Bruno Tabacci, to whom Giuseppe Giovenzana succeeded in 1989.

12 May 1985 Lombard regional election results
Parties	Votes	%	Seats	+/-
Christian Democracy	2,204,685	36.03	31	▼3
Italian Communist Party	1,632,676	26.68	22	▼1
Italian Socialist Party	941,395	15.38	12	▲1
Italian Social Movement	363,918	5.95	4	▲1
Italian Republican Party	293,359	4.79	4	▲2
Italian Democratic Socialist Party	170.763	2.79	2	▼1
Green List	146,835	2.40	2	▲2
Italian Liberal Party	143,641	2.35	1	▼1
Proletarian Democracy	136,781	2.24	2	▲▼
National Pensioners' Party	32,945	0.54	–	
Lombard League	28,074	0.46	–	
Valdostan Union – Democratic Party – others	15,475	0.25	–	
Humanist Party	4,448	0.07	–	
Monarchist National Party	4,352	0.07	–	
Total parties	6,119,347	100.00	80	
Invalid/blank votes	331,013			
Registered voters	6,450,360	92.81		
Source: Ministry of the Interior – Results

Popular vote
DC	36.03%
PCI	26.68%
PSI	15.38%
MSI	5.95%
PRI	4.79%
PSDI	2.79%
Greens	2.40%
PLI	2.35%
DP	2.24%
Others	1.39%

=== Seats by province ===
Province	DC	PCI	PSI	MSI	PRI	PSDI	Greens	PLI	DP	Total
Milan	11	11	6	2	3	1	1	1	1	37
Brescia	4	2	1	1	-	1	1	-	-	10
Bergamo	5	2	1	-	-	-	-	-	1	9
Varese	3	2	1	1	1	-	-	-	-	8
Como	3	1	1	-	-	-	-	-	-	5
Pavia	2	2	1	-	-	-	-	-	-	5
Mantua	1	1	1	-	-	-	-	-	-	3
Cremona	1	1	-	-	-	-	-	-	-	2
Sondrio	1	-	-	-	-	-	-	-	-	1
Total	31	22	12	4	4	2	2	1	2	80
