= 1980 Lombard regional election =

3rd election of the Council and the President of the Lombard region

The 1980 Lombard regional election took place on 8 June 1980. The 3rd term of the Regional Council was chosen.

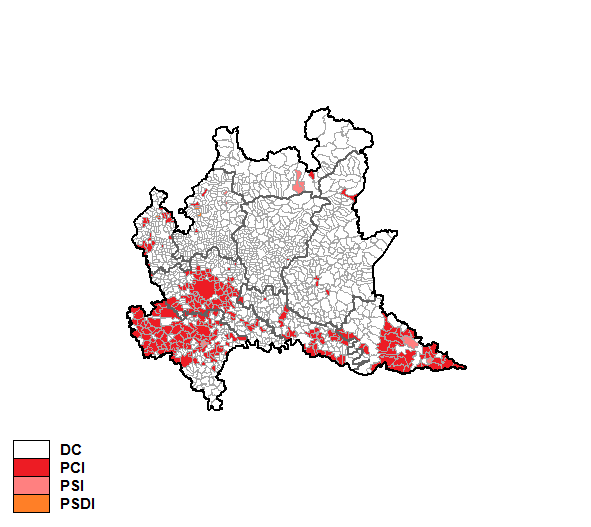
Largest party by municipality

== Electoral law ==
Election was held under proportional representation with provincial constituencies where the largest remainder method with a Droop quota was used. To ensure more proportionality, remained votes and seats were transferred at regional level and calculated at-large.

== Results ==
The Christian Democracy party was by far the largest. After the election the incumbent president Giuseppe Guzzetti was re-elected at the head of a center-left coalition comprising also the PSI, the PSDI and the PRI.

8 June 1980 Lombard regional election results
Party	Votes	%	Seats	+/-
Christian Democracy	2,240,861	38.86	34	▲2
Italian Communist Party	1,623,352	28.15	23	▼2
Italian Socialist Party	834,111	14.46	11	=
Italian Democratic Socialist Party	260,611	4.52	3	=
Italian Social Movement	251,745	4.37	3	=
Italian Liberal Party	197,301	3.42	2	=
Italian Republican Party	152,605	2.65	2	=
Proletarian Democracy	96,882	1.68	1	▼1
Proletarian Unity Party	86,631	1.50	1	▲1
Association for Trieste	10,001	0.17	0	
Milanese List	3,825	0.07	0	
Social Action Christian Party	2,738	0.05	0	
Revolutionary Communist League	2,590	0.04	0	
European Workers' Party	2,529	0.04	0	
Revolutionary Socialist League	1,086	0.02	0	
Total valid votes	5,766,868		80	
Blank votes	233,742			
Invalid votes (blank included)	380,286			
Total	6,147,154			
Registered voters & turnout	6,647,073	92.48		

Source: Ministry of the Interior

=== Seats by province ===
Province	DC	PCI	PSI	PSDI	MSI	PLI	PRI	DP	PdUP	Total
Milan	12	11	6	2	2	2	2	1	1	39
Brescia	5	2	1	1	1	-	-	-	-	10
Bergamo	5	2	1	-	-	-	-	-	-	8
Como	3	2	1	-	-	-	-	-	-	6
Varese	3	2	1	-	-	-	-	-	-	6
Pavia	2	2	1	-	-	-	-	-	-	5
Cremona	2	1	-	-	-	-	-	-	-	3
Mantua	1	1	-	-	-	-	-	-	-	2
Sondrio	1	-	-	-	-	-	-	-	-	1
Total	34	23	11	3	3	2	2	1	1	80
