= President of Lombardy =

Head of government

- Seal of Lombardy

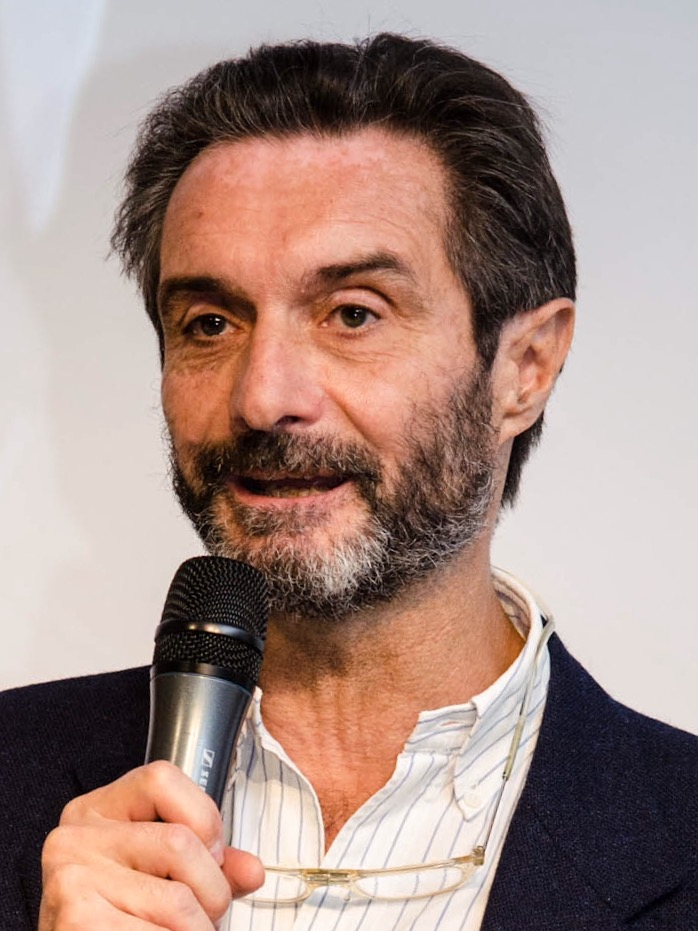
- Incumbent; Attilio Fontana since 26 March 2018
- Style: No title, style or courtesy
- Seat: Palazzo Lombardia, Milan
- Term length: 5 years
- Inaugural holder: Pietro Bassetti
- Formation: 29 July 1970
- Website: President of Lombardy

The president of Lombardy is the supreme authority of Lombardy, the most populated region of Italy.

== Election ==
Originally appointed by the Regional Council of Lombardy, since 1995 de facto and 2000 de jure, the president is elected by popular vote every five years under universal suffrage: the candidate who receives a plurality of votes is elected.

The office is connected to the Regional Council, which is elected contextually: a majority bonus hugely increases the number of his supporters in the assembly. The Council and the president are linked by an alleged relationship of confidence: if the president resigns or he is dismissed by the Council, a snap election is called for both the legislative and the executive offices, because in no case the two bodies can be chosen separately.

The popular election of the president and the relationship of confidence between him and the legislature, allow to identify the Lombard model of government as a particular form of semi-presidential system.

== Powers ==
The president of Lombardy promulgates regional laws and regulations and can receive special administrative functions by the national government. The president is one of the eighty members of the Regional Council and, in this capacity, can propose new laws.

The president appoints and dismisses the Regional Cabinet (called Giunta Regionale in Italian). The Cabinet is composed by no more than sixteen regional assessors (assessori, literally "aldermen"), who can be members of the Council at the same time. Assessors should not be confused with the ministers: according to Italian administrative law, assessors only receive delegations from the president to rule a bureau or an agency, the Region being a single legal person, not divided in ministries. One assessor can be appointed Vice President. The president can also appoint four under-secretaries (sottosegretari) to assist with the president's functions.

The Regional Cabinet prepares the budget, appoints the boards of public regional agencies and companies, manages assets, develops projects of governance, and resorts to the Constitutional Court of Italy if it thinks that a national law may violate regional powers. The president and the Cabinet are two different authorities of the Region: in matters within its competence, the Cabinet has the power to vote to give its approval.

== See also ==
- List of presidents of Lombardy
- Regional Council of Lombardy
