= List of elections in 2009 =

The following elections occurred in the year 2009.

- Electoral calendar 2009
- 2009 United Nations Security Council election

== Caribbean ==
- 2009 Antiguan general election
- 2009 Aruban general election
- 2009 Caymanian constitutional referendum
- 2009 Caymanian general election
- 2009 Curaçao status referendum
- 2009 Dominican general election
- 2009 Haitian Senate election
- 2009 Montserratian general election
- 2009 Vincentian constitutional referendum
- 2009 Tobago House of Assembly election

== Africa ==
- 2009 Algerian presidential election
- 2009 Botswana general election
- 2009 Botswana local elections
- 2009 Comorian constitutional referendum
- 2009 Comorian legislative election
- 2009 Republic of the Congo presidential election
- 2009 Equatorial Guinean presidential election
- 2009 Gabonese presidential election
- 2009 Guinea-Bissau presidential election
- 2009 Liberian by-elections
- 2009 Mahoran status referendum
- 2009 Malawian general election
- 2009 Mauritanian presidential election
- 2009 Mozambican general election
- 2009 Namibian general election
- 2009 Nigerien constitutional referendum
- 2009 Nigerien parliamentary election
- 2009 Somali presidential election
- 2009 South African general election
- 2009 South African presidential election
- 2009 Puntland presidential election
- 2009 Tunisian general election

== Asia ==
- 2009 Abkhazian presidential election
- 2009 Afghan presidential election
- 2009 Azerbaijani constitutional referendum
- 2009 Bangkok gubernatorial election
- 2009 Bangladeshi presidential election
- 2009 East Timorese local elections
- 2009 Indonesian presidential election
- 2009 Indonesian legislative election
- 2009 Iranian presidential election
- 2009 Israeli legislative election
- 2009 Kuwaiti parliamentary election
- 2009 Kyrgyz presidential election
- 2009 Lebanese general election
- 2009 Macanese legislative election
- 2009 Maldivian parliamentary election
- 2009 Mongolian presidential election
- 2009 North Korean parliamentary election
- 2009 Northern Cyprus parliamentary election
- 2009 Sri Lanka Central and North Western Provincial Council elections
- 2008–09 Sri Lankan provincial council elections
- 2009 Sri Lankan local government elections
- 2009 Taiwanese local elections
- 2009 Thai by-elections
- 2008–09 Turkmen parliamentary election
- 2009–2010 Uzbek parliamentary election

=== India ===
==== Indian general ====
- 2009 Indian general election analysis
- 2009 Indian general election campaign controversies
- 2009 Indian general election
- Indian general election in Uttar Pradesh, 2009
- Indian general election in West Bengal, 2009
- Indian general election in Orissa, 2009
- Indian general election in Gujarat, 2009
- Indian general election in Madhya Pradesh, 2009
- Indian general election in Andaman and Nicobar Islands, 2009
- Indian general election in Andhra Pradesh, 2009
- Indian general election in Assam, 2009
- Indian general election in Bihar, 2009
- Indian general election in Chandigarh, 2009
- Indian general election in Chhattisgarh, 2009
- Indian general election in Dadra & Nagar Haveli, 2009
- Indian general election in Daman & Diu, 2009
- Indian general election in Goa, 2009
- Indian general election in Haryana, 2009
- Indian general election in Jharkhand, 2009
- Indian general election in Karnataka, 2009
- Indian general election in Kerala, 2009
- Indian general election in Lakshadweep, 2009
- Indian general election in Maharashtra, 2009
- Indian general election in Manipur, 2009
- Indian general election in Meghalaya, 2009
- Indian general election in Mizoram, 2009
- Indian general election in Nagaland, 2009
- Indian general election in National Capital Territory of Delhi, 2009
- Indian general election in Pondicherry, 2009
- Indian general election in Punjab, 2009
- Indian general election in Rajasthan, 2009
- Indian general election in Sikkim, 2009
- Indian general election in Tamil Nadu, 2009
- Indian general election in Tripura, 2009
- Indian general election in Uttarakhand, 2009
- Results of the 2009 Indian general election by parliamentary constituency
- Results of the 2009 Indian general election by party
- Results of the 2009 Indian general election by state
- Results of the 2009 Indian general election in Tamil Nadu by state assembly constituents

=== Iraq ===
- 2009 Kurdistan Region parliamentary election
- 2009 Kurdistan Region presidential election

==== Iraqi governorate ====
- 2009 Iraqi governorate elections
- 2009 Al Anbar governorate election
- 2009 Al Muthanna governorate election
- 2009 Al-Qādisiyyah governorate election
- 2009 Arbil governorate election
- 2009 As Sulaymaniyah governorate election
- 2009 Babil governorate election
- 2009 Baghdad governorate election
- 2009 Basra governorate election
- 2009 Dahuk governorate election
- 2009 Dhi Qar governorate election
- 2009 Diyala governorate election
- 2009 Karbala governorate election
- 2009 Kirkuk governorate election
- 2009 Maysan governorate election
- 2009 Najaf governorate election
- 2009 Ninawa governorate election
- 2009 Salah ad Din governorate election
- 2009 Wasit governorate election

=== Japan ===
- 2009 Japanese general election
- 2009 Democratic Party (Japan, 1998) leadership election
- 2009 Liberal Democratic Party (Japan) leadership election
- 2009 Tokyo prefectural election
- 2009 Yokohama mayoral election

=== Malaysia ===
- 2009 Bagan Pinang by-election
- 2009 Batang Ai by-election
- 2009 Bukit Gantang by-election
- 2009 Bukit Selambau by-election
- 2009 Kuala Terengganu by-election
- 2009 Penanti by-election

=== Taiwan (Republic of China) ===
- 2009 Taiwanese local elections

== Europe ==
- 2009 Albanian parliamentary election
- 2009 Andorran parliamentary election
- 2009 Azerbaijani constitutional referendum
- 2009 Basque regional election
- 2009 Belgian regional elections
- 2009 Bulgarian parliamentary election
- 2009–2010 Croatian presidential election
- 2009 Croatian local elections
- 2009 Danish Act of Succession referendum
- 2009 Danish local elections
- 2009 Estonian municipal elections
- 2009 European Parliament election in Romania
- 2009 European Parliament election in Slovenia
- 2009 Fingal County Council election
- 2009 Greek legislative election
- 2009 Icelandic parliamentary election
- 2009 Irish local elections
- 2009 Kosovan local elections
- 2009 Liechtenstein general election
- 2009 Lithuanian presidential election
- 2009 Luxembourg general election
- 2009 Macedonian presidential election
- 2009 Maltese local elections
- 2009 Maltese presidential election
- April 2009 Moldovan parliamentary election
- July 2009 Moldovan parliamentary election
- 2009 Montenegrin parliamentary election
- 2009 New Democracy leadership election
- 2009 Northern Cyprus parliamentary election
- 2009 Norwegian parliamentary election
- 2009 Norwegian Sami parliamentary election
- 2009 Portuguese legislative election
- 2009 Portuguese local elections
- 2009 Romanian parliamentary reform referendum
- 2009 Romanian presidential election
- 2009 Serbian local elections
- 2009 Slovak presidential election
- 2009 Sammarinese local elections
- 2009 South Ossetian parliamentary election
- 2009 Split local elections
- 2009 Ternopil Oblast local election
- 2009 Turkish local elections
- Twenty-eighth Amendment of the Constitution of Ireland
- 2009 Zagreb local elections

=== Austria ===
- 2009 Carinthian state and municipal elections
- 2009 European Parliament election in Austria
- 2009 Salzburg state and municipal elections
- 2009 Upper Austrian state election
- 2009 Vorarlberg state election

=== European Parliament ===
- 2009 European Parliament election
- 2009 European Parliament election in Austria
- 2009 European Parliament election in Belgium
- 2009 European Parliament election in Bulgaria
- 2009 European Parliament election in Cyprus
- 2009 European Parliament election in the Czech Republic
- 2009 European Parliament election in Denmark
- 2009 European Parliament election in Estonia
- 2009 European Parliament election in Aosta Valley
- 2009 European Parliament election in Friuli-Venezia Giulia
- 2009 European Parliament election in Lombardy
- 2009 European Parliament election in Piedmont
- 2009 European Parliament election in Sardinia
- 2009 European Parliament election in Sicily
- 2009 European Parliament election in Trentino-Alto Adige/Südtirol
- 2009 European Parliament election in Veneto
- 2009 European Parliament election in Finland
- 2009 European Parliament election in France
- 2009 European Parliament election in Germany
- 2009 European Parliament election in Gibraltar
- 2009 European Parliament election in Greece
- 2009 European Parliament election in Hungary
- 2009 European Parliament election in Ireland
- 2009 European Parliament election in Italy
- 2009 European Parliament election in Latvia
- List of Libertas list candidates at the 2009 European Parliament elections
- 2009 European Parliament election in Lithuania
- 2009 European Parliament election in Luxembourg
- 2009 European Parliament election in Malta
- 2009 European Parliament election in the Netherlands
- 2009 European Parliament election in Poland
- 2009 European Parliament election in Portugal
- 2009 European Parliament election in Romania
- 2009 European Parliament election in Slovakia
- 2009 European Parliament election in Slovenia
- 2009 European Parliament election in Spain
- 2009 European Parliament election in Sweden
- 2009 European Parliament election in the United Kingdom

=== Germany ===
- 2009 Brandenburg state election
- 2009 European Parliament election in Germany
- 2009 German federal election
- 2009 German presidential election
- 2009 Hessian state election
- 2009 Saarland state election
- 2009 Saxony state election
- 2009 Schleswig-Holstein state election
- 2009 Thuringia state election

=== Italy ===
- 2009 Democratic Party (Italy) leadership election
- 2009 European Parliament election in Aosta Valley
- 2009 European Parliament election in Friuli-Venezia Giulia
- 2009 European Parliament election in Italy
- 2009 European Parliament election in Lombardy
- 2009 European Parliament election in Piedmont
- 2009 European Parliament election in Sardinia
- 2009 European Parliament election in Sicily
- 2009 European Parliament election in Trentino-Alto Adige/Südtirol
- 2009 European Parliament election in Veneto
- 2009 Italian electoral law referendum
- 2009 Sardinian regional election

=== Moldova ===
- April 2009 Moldovan parliamentary election
- July 2009 Moldovan parliamentary election
- Moldovan presidential election, May–June 2009
- Moldovan presidential election, November–December 2009

=== Spain ===
- 2009 European Parliament election in Spain
- 2009 Galician regional election

=== Switzerland ===
- 2009 Swiss Federal Council election
- 2009 Grand Council of Geneva election
- 2009 Grand Council of Valais election
- February 2009 Swiss referendum
- May 2009 Swiss referendum
- November 2009 Swiss referendum
- September 2009 Swiss referendum

=== United Kingdom ===
- 2009 Doncaster Council mayoral election
- 2009 European Parliament election in the United Kingdom
- 2009 Glasgow North East by-election
- 2009 Norwich North by-election
- 2009 Speaker of the British House of Commons election
- 2009 UK Independence Party leadership election
- 2009 United Kingdom local elections

==== United Kingdom local ====
- 2009 United Kingdom local elections

===== English local =====
- 2009 Bristol City Council election
- 2009 Buckinghamshire County Council election
- 2009 Cambridgeshire County Council election
- 2009 Cornwall Council election
- 2009 Cumbria Council election
- 2009 Derbyshire County Council election
- 2009 Devon County Council election
- 2009 Dorset County Council election
- 2009 East Sussex County Council election
- 2009 Essex County Council election
- 2009 Gloucestershire County Council election
- 2009 Hampshire County Council election
- 2009 Hartlepool County Council mayoral election
- 2009 Hertfordshire County Council election
- 2009 Isle of Wight Council election
- 2009 Isles of Scilly Council election
- 2009 Kent County Council election
- 2009 Lancashire County Council election
- 2009 Leicestershire County Council election
- 2009 Lincolnshire County Council election
- 2009 Norfolk County Council election
- 2009 North Tyneside County Council mayoral election
- 2009 North Yorkshire County Council election
- 2009 Northamptonshire County Council election
- 2009 Nottinghamshire Council election
- 2009 Oxfordshire County Council election
- 2009 Shropshire Council election
- 2009 Somerset County Council election
- 2009 Staffordshire Council election
- 2009 Suffolk County Council election
- 2009 Surrey County Council election
- 2009 Warwickshire County Council election
- 2009 West Sussex County Council election
- 2009 Wiltshire Council election
- 2009 Worcestershire County Council election

== North America ==
- 2009 Belizean municipal elections
- 2009 Greenlandic parliamentary election
- 2009 Honduran general election
- 2009 Panamanian general election
- 2009 Salvadoran legislative election
- 2009 Salvadoran presidential election

=== Canada ===
- Canadian electoral calendar, 2009
- 2009 Bedford municipal election
- 2009 Brigham municipal election
- 2009 British Columbia electoral reform referendum
- 2009 British Columbia general election
- 2009 Bromont municipal election
- 2009 Canadian federal by-elections
- 2009 Cowansville municipal election
- 2009 Green Party of Ontario leadership election
- 2009 Liberal Party of Canada leadership election
- 2009 Magog municipal election
- 2009 Manitoba provincial by-elections
- 2009 New Democratic Party of Manitoba leadership election
- 2009 Newfoundland and Labrador municipal elections
- 2009 Nova Scotia general election
- Ontario New Democratic Party leadership convention, 2009
- 2009 Progressive Conservative Party of Ontario leadership election
- 2009 Action démocratique du Québec leadership election
- 2009 Saskatchewan municipal elections
- 2009 Wildrose Alliance Party of Alberta leadership election

==== Quebec municipal ====
- 2009 Quebec municipal elections
- 2009 Gatineau municipal election
- 2009 Montreal municipal election

=== Caribbean ===
- 2009 Antigua and Barbuda general election
- 2009 Aruban general election
- 2009 Caymanian constitutional referendum
- 2009 Caymanian general election
- 2009 Curaçao status referendum
- 2009 Dominican general election
- 2009 Haitian Senate election
- 2009 Montserratian general election
- 2009 Saint Vincent and the Grenadines constitutional referendum
- 2009 Tobago House of Assembly election

=== Mexico ===
- 2009 Mexican elections
- 2009 Colima state election
- 2009 Mexican legislative election
- 2009 Nuevo León state election

=== United States ===
- 2009 United States elections

==== United States House of Representatives ====
- 2009 California's 10th congressional district special election
- 2009 California's 32nd congressional district special election
- 2009 Illinois's 5th congressional district special election
- 2009 New York's 20th congressional district special election
- 2009 New York's 23rd congressional district special election

==== United States lieutentant gubernatorial ====
- 2009 Virginia lieutenant gubernatorial election

==== United States gubernatorial ====
- 2009 New Jersey gubernatorial election
- 2009 Northern Mariana Islands gubernatorial election
- 2009 United States gubernatorial elections
- 2009 Virginia gubernatorial election

==== United States mayoral ====
- 2009 Albany mayoral election
- 2009 Albuquerque mayoral election
- 2009 Allentown mayoral election
- 2009 Anchorage mayoral election
- 2009 Arlington mayoral election
- 2009 Atlanta elections
- 2009 Austin mayoral election
- 2009–10 Birmingham, Alabama mayoral special election
- 2009 Boston mayoral election
- 2009 Buffalo mayoral election
- 2009 Burlington, Vermont mayoral election
- 2009 Charlotte mayoral election
- 2009 Cincinnati mayoral election
- 2009 Cleveland mayoral election
- 2009 Dayton mayoral election
- 2009 Detroit mayoral election
- 2009 Detroit mayoral special election
- 2009 Durham mayoral election
- 2009 El Paso mayoral election
- 2009 Fayetteville, North Carolina mayoral election
- 2009 Flint mayoral special election
- 2009 Fort Lauderdale mayoral election
- 2009 Fort Worth mayoral election
- 2009 Harrisburg mayoral election
- 2009 Houston mayoral election
- 2009 Jackson mayoral election
- 2009 Jersey City mayoral election
- 2009 Lansing mayoral election
- 2009 Los Angeles mayoral election
- 2009 Manchester, New Hampshire, mayoral election
- 2009 Memphis mayoral special election
- 2009 Miami mayoral election
- 2009 Minneapolis mayoral election
- 2009 Montgomery mayoral special election
- 2009 New York City mayoral election
- 2009 Omaha mayoral election
- 2009 Overland Park mayoral election
- 2009 Pittsburgh mayoral election
- 2009 Raleigh mayoral election
- 2009 Riverside, California, mayoral election
- 2009 Rochester mayoral election
- 2009 Saint Paul mayoral election
- 2009 San Antonio mayoral election
- 2009 San Bernardino mayoral election
- 2009 Seattle mayoral election
- 2009 Springfield, Massachusetts mayoral election
- 2009 St. Louis mayoral election
- 2009 St. Petersburg, Florida mayoral election
- 2009 Syracuse mayoral election
- 2009 Toledo, Ohio mayoral election
- 2009 Tulsa mayoral election
- 2009 Winston-Salem mayoral election
- 2009 Worcester, Massachusetts mayoral election

==== California ====
- 2009 California state special elections
- 2009 Los Angeles City Attorney election
- November 2009 San Francisco general election

==== Iowa ====
- 2009 Iowa special elections

==== New Jersey ====
- 2009 New Jersey elections
- 2009 New Jersey General Assembly election

==== New York ====
- 2009 New York elections
- 2009 New York City Comptroller election
- 2009 New York City Public Advocate election

==== Pennsylvania ====
- 2009 Pennsylvania state elections

==== Virginia ====
- 2009 Virginia elections
- 2009 Virginia House of Delegates election

==== Washington (U.S. state) ====
- Washington Referendum 71 (2009)
- 2009 Washington State local elections

== Oceania ==
- February 2009 French Polynesian presidential election
- November 2009 French Polynesian presidential election
- 2009 Vanuatuan presidential election
- 2009 Marshall Islands presidential election
- 2009 Micronesian parliamentary election
- 2009 New Caledonian legislative election
- 2009 Tamarua by-election

=== Australia ===
- 2009 Bradfield by-election
- 2009 Fremantle state by-election
- 2009 Frome state by-election
- 2009 Higgins by-election
- 2009 Pembroke state by-election
- 2009 Queensland state election
- 2009 Western Australian daylight saving referendum

=== New Zealand ===
- 2009 New Zealand citizens-initiated referendum
- 2009 Mount Albert by-election

=== Northern Mariana Islands ===
- 2009 Northern Mariana Islands general election
- 2009 Northern Mariana Islands legislative election
- 2009 Northern Mariana Islands gubernatorial election

== South America ==
- 2009 Argentine legislative election
- 2009 Bolivian constitutional referendum
- 2009 Bolivian general election
- 2009 Chilean parliamentary election
- 2009–10 Chilean presidential election
- 2009 Ecuadorian general election
- 2009 Falkland Islands general election
- 2009 Uruguayan general election
- 2009 Venezuelan constitutional referendum
