= 2005 Bedford municipal election =

The 2005 Town of Bedford municipal election took place on November 6, 2005, to elect a mayor and councillors in the town of Bedford, Quebec. All members of council were returned without opposition.

== Results ==
2005 Bedford election, Mayor of Bedford
Candidate	Total votes	% of total votes
(incumbent)Claude Dubois	accl.	.

2005 Bedford election, Councillor, District One
Candidate	Total votes	% of total votes
(incumbent)Arlene Murray	accl.	.

2005 Bedford election, Councillor, District Two
Candidate	Total votes	% of total votes
(incumbent)Luc Gnocchini	accl.	.

2005 Bedford election, Councillor, District Three
Candidate	Total votes	% of total votes
(incumbent)Madeleine Fortin	accl.	.

2005 Bedford election, Councillor, District Four
Candidate	Total votes	% of total votes
(incumbent)Tommy Gladu	accl.	.

2005 Bedford election, Councillor, District Five
Candidate	Total votes	% of total votes
Lucien Menard	accl.	.

2005 Bedford election, Councillor, District Six
Candidate	Total votes	% of total votes
(incumbent)Mona Beaulac	accl.	.

Source: Élections municipales 2005, Affairs municipales, Régions, et Occupation du Territoire.
