= 2009 European Parliament election in Sardinia =

The European Parliament election of 2009 took place on 6–7 June 2009.

The Democratic Party allied with Italy of Values, and the Radicals was the largest party coalition with 47.1%.

== Results ==
Parties	votes	votes (%)
The People of Freedom	202,145	36.6
Democratic Party	196,396	35.6
Italy of Values	48,756	8.8
Union of the Centre	29,800	5.4
Anticapitalist List (PRC–PdCI)	26,429	4.8
Left and Freedom (MpS–FdV–PS)	16,297	3.0
Bonino-Pannella List	14,819	2.7
The Autonomy (Right–MpA)	7,393	1.3
Others	9,615	1.7
Total	551,650	100.0

Source: Ministry of the Interior
