= 2009 European Parliament election in Trentino-Alto Adige/Südtirol =

The European Parliament election of 2009 took place on 6–7 June 2009.

The Democratic Party was the most voted list in Trentino (27.9%), narrowly ahead of The People of Freedom (26.3%), while the South Tyrolean People's Party (SVP) came first as usual in South Tyrol (52.1%) and got its leading candidate Herbert Dorfmann elected to the European Parliament. In the Province of Trento the Union for Trentino supported both the Trentino Tyrolean Autonomist Party and the Union of the Centre, that both had good results, 8.2% and 6.1% respectively.

== Results ==
=== Trentino ===
Party	votes	votes (%)
Democratic Party	63,693	27.9
The People of Freedom	59,949	26.3
Lega Nord	34,033	14.9
Union of the Centre	18,590	8.2
Italy of Values	15,419	6.8
Trentino Tyrolean Autonomist Party	13,920	6.1
Bonino-Pannella List	6,544	2.9
Left and Freedom (MpS–Greens–PS)	5,703	2.5
Anticapitalist List (PRC–PdCI)	3,920	1.7
The Autonomy (Right–MpA)	2,895	1.3
Others	3,144	1.5
Total	228,070	100.0

Source: Ministry of the Interior

=== South Tyrol ===
Party	votes	votes (%)
South Tyrolean People's Party	117,685	52.1
The People of Freedom	28,877	12.8
Left and Freedom (incl. Greens)	24,641	10.9
Democratic Party	16,319	7.2
Italy of Values	15,090	6.7
Lega Nord	10,906	4.8
Bonino-Pannella List	3,835	1.7
Union of the Centre	3,664	1.6
Others	4,812	2.1
Total	225,829	100.0

Source: Ministry of the Interior
