= 2009 European Parliament election in Friuli-Venezia Giulia =

The 2009 European Parliament election in Italy took place on 6–7 June 2009.

The People of Freedom was largest party in Friuli-Venezia Giulia with 31.8%, followed by the Democratic Party (25.6%) and Lega Nord (17.5%).

== Results ==
Party	votes	votes (%)
The People of Freedom	207,443	31.8
Democratic Party	166,722	25.6
Lega Nord	113,695	17.5
Italy of Values	47,494	7.3
Union of the Centre	41,202	6.3
Bonino-Pannella List	19,313	3.0
Anticapitalist List (PRC–PdCI)	16,330	2.5
Left and Freedom (MpS–FdV–PS)	10,705	1.6
The Autonomy (Right–MpA)	7,891	1.2
Tricolour Flame	6,513	1.0
Others	14,019	2.1
Total	651,327	100.0

Source: Ministry of the Interior
