= Lega Padana Lombardia =

Former political party in Italy

Lega Padana Lombardia (Padanian League Lombardy), briefly in 2008 part of the Lombardia Autonoma (Self-Governing Lombardy) coalition, was a Padanist and autonomist political party active in Lombardy, northern Italy, between 2001 and 2011.

The party emerged in 2001 as a split from Lega Lombarda–Lega Nord led by Roberto Bernardelli, a long-time member of Lega Nord, at the time a regional deputy for Lombardy. The main reason why Bernardelli left the party was that he considered it to be too similar to Forza Italia, the coalition partner of Lega Nord since 2000. In the 2005 regional elections in Lombardy, the party won 0.9% of the vote, despite not having candidates in all provinces.

In 2008 the party joined Independentist Front Lombardy (led by Max Ferrari) and Lombardy Project (led by Giulio Arrighini) in order to form Lombardia Autonoma, a coalition of parties offering an alternative to Lega Lombarda. In 2009 the party returned to the name of Lega Padana Lombardia. Max Ferrari was a candidate for Autonomy in the 2009 European Parliament election. In the provincial election of Brescia, the party won 2.9% of the vote, while its candidate Arrighini scored 3.2%.

In February 2010 the party chose not to run its own lists in the 2010 regional election. In a press release, Ferrari explained that the party was only at 1.8–2.3% in the opinion polls (below the 3% threshold needed by parties outside big coalitions to elect any regional councillors) and that the only result of their standing would have been to damage the like-minded "cousins" in Lega Lombarda–Lega Nord and to help The People of Freedom. The candidate of LPL would have been Giancarlo Pagliarini, a former minister for Lega Nord.

In 2011 local elections the party won 2.6% of the vote in the Province of Mantua and 1.5% in the Province of Pavia, while its candidate for mayor of Milan, Giancarlo Pagliarini, gained just 0.6% of the vote. All of these results fell short of the electoral thresholds.

In November 2011 the party was merged into the Padanian Union.

== Leadership ==
- Secretary: Roberto Bernardelli (2001–2010), Giulio Arrighini (2010–2011)
- President: Roberto Bernardelli (2010–2011)
