= 2009 European Parliament election in Sicily =

The European Parliament election of 2009 took place on 6–7 June 2009.

The People of Freedom was largest party in Sicily with 36.4%, largely ahead of the Democratic Party (21.9%), the Movement for the Autonomies (15.6%), that ran in list within The Autonomy coalition, and the Union of the Centre (11.9%).

== Results ==
Parties	votes	votes (%)
The People of Freedom	692,340	36.4
Democratic Party	415,680	21.9
The Autonomy (MpA–Right)	297,155	15.6
Union of the Centre	225,964	11.9
Italy of Values	135,457	7.1
Anticapitalist List (PRC–PdCI)	42,692	2.2
Left and Freedom (MpS–FdV–PS)	40,278	2.1
Bonino-Pannella List	29,832	1.6
Others	20,246	1.1
Total	1,899,644	100.0

Source: Ministry of the Interior
