= Max Ferrari =

Max Ferrari may refer:

- Max Ferrari (politician) (born 1971), Italian politician and journalist
- Max Ferrari (soccer) (born 2000), Canadian soccer player
