= 2009 European Parliament election in Lombardy =

The 2009 European Parliament election took place on 6–7 June 2009.

The People of Freedom (33.9%) was the largest party in Lombardy, ahead of Lega Nord (22.7%) and the Democratic Party (21.3%).

== Results ==
Party	votes	votes (%)
The People of Freedom	1,819,888	33.9
Lega Nord	1,221,274	22.7
Democratic Party	1,146,814	21.3
Italy of Values	349,763	6.5
Union of the Centre	269,441	5.0
Bonino-Pannella List	149,005	2.8
Anticapitalist List (PRC–PdCI)	146,910	2.7
Left and Freedom (MpS–Greens–PS)	106,126	2.0
Others	163,919	3.0
Total	5,373,140	100.0

Source: Ministry of the Interior
