= Max Ferrari (politician) =

Italian politician and journalist (born 1971)

Massimiliano "Max" Ferrari (born 29 May 1971) is an Italian politician and journalist.

== Biography ==
Ferrari was born in Varese. He joined the Lega Nord party in 1989 when he was just sixteen. In the 1998 when TelePadania (the Television of Lega Nord Party) was founded he was called to lead a television program about foreign policy, after he became the director of the TG-Nord (the television journal of TelePadania) from 12 October 2002 until 10 April 2006 and in various special occasions (such as in Serbia, Palestine, Lebanon, Afghanistan, Cambodia, Laos, Vietnam and Iraq during the war) he was a freelance war reporter.

Ferrari left the Lega Nord in 2006, in order to found the separatist party named Independentist Front Lombardy (Fronte Indipendentista Lombardia), which later joined Lega Padana of Roberto Bernardelli in order to build a new autonomist lombard party Lombardia Autonoma then he ran for 2009 European Parliament election in the Pole of Autonomy list.

In April 2010, he returned to the Lega Nord of Umberto Bossi. He's the Secretary General of the Lombardy-Israel Association.
