= 2009 Brigham municipal election =

The 2009 Brigham municipal election was held on November 1, 2009, to elect a mayor and councillors in Brigham, Quebec. All incumbents were re-elected without opposition.

== Results ==
2009 Brigham election, Mayor of Brigham
Candidate	Total votes	% of total votes
(incumbent)Steven Neil	accl.	.

- Steven Neil was first elected as mayor of Brigham in 1999, defeating incumbent mayor André Leroux. He was re-elected without opposition in 2003, 2005, and 2009. Neil took part in merger negotiations with the mayors of Bromont, Cowansville, and East Farnham in 2001; ultimately, the communities remained separate.

2009 Brigham election, Councillor, District One
Candidate	Total votes	% of total votes
(incumbent)Daniel Meunier	accl.	.

2009 Brigham election, Councillor, District Two
Candidate	Total votes	% of total votes
(incumbent)Michelyne Cournoyer	accl.	.

2009 Brigham election, Councillor, District Three
Candidate	Total votes	% of total votes
(incumbent)Yvan Forand	accl.	.

2009 Brigham election, Councillor, District Four
Candidate	Total votes	% of total votes
(incumbent)Réjean Racine	accl.	.

2009 Brigham election, Councillor, District Five
Candidate	Total votes	% of total votes
(incumbent)Marc Labrecque	accl.	.

2009 Brigham election, Councillor, District Six
Candidate	Total votes	% of total votes
Normand Delisle	accl.	.

Source: Official results, Government of Quebec
