= Riccardo Sarfatti =

Italian architect, entrepreneur and politician

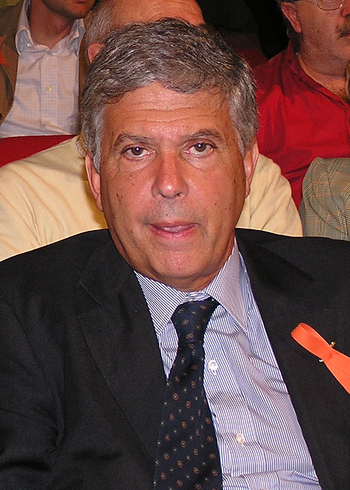
Riccardo Sarfatti

Riccardo Sarfatti (April 3, 1940, Milan – September 9, 2010, Tremezzo) was an Italian architect, entrepreneur and politician.

== Life ==
Sarfatti was married and had three children, He graduated in architecture from Politecnico di Milano in 1965, and was an assistant professor of Urban Planning, Ordinary of the same Polytechnic Institute and professor for the course of History of Architecture in Venice and the Faculty of Architecture in Milan. In 1979 he founded Luceplan SpA (a company of 100 employees and turnover of €25 million) of which he was CEO.

Sarfatti has pledged for years as the president of Confindustria Assoluce and vice-president of FLA. He was president of CNAD (National Council of Associations for Design) and member of the Presidential Committee for Freedom and Justice. He was involved in the association "Liberal Entrepreneurs", and was very critical of the president of Confindustria, Antonio D'Amato.

He was one of the founders of the Italian Democratic Party section of Lombardy. When the political alliance, supporting Roberto Formigoni as a candidate for President, won the lombard regional election of April 2005, the political coalition of Sarfatti increased its voting percentage to 46.5%, in comparison to the 31.5% of the preceding weekday in 2000.

He died near Como, in a car accident on September 9, 2010.

== Politics ==
In the regional elections of Lombardy of April 3, 2005, Sarfatti was The Union candidate for President of the Region, and he was defeated by the outgoing President Roberto Formigoni, while improving the result achieved by his coalition compared to previous regional in 2000, passing from 31.5% to 43.6% of the votes.
