= 2005 Lombard regional election =

- 3–4 April 2005

All 80 seats to the Regional Council of Lombardy
- Turnout: 72.97% (▼2.62%)
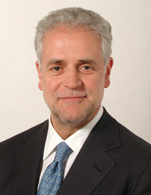

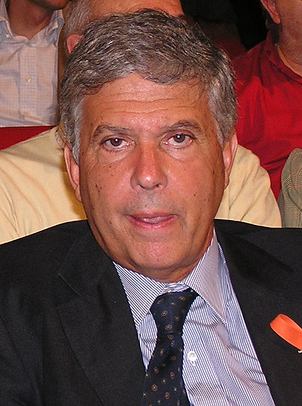
	Majority party	Minority party
Leader	Roberto Formigoni	Riccardo Sarfatti
Party	Forza Italia	Independent
Alliance	House of Freedoms	The Union
Last election	51 seats, 62.4%	26 seats, 31.5%
Seats won	52	28
Seat change	▲1	▲2
Popular vote	2,841,883	2,278,173
Percentage	53.9%	43.2%
Swing	▼8.5%	▲11.7%
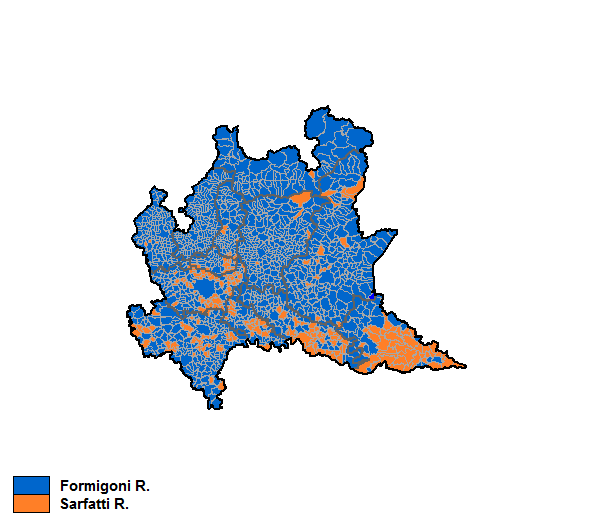
President before election
Roberto Formigoni
FI
President-elect
Roberto Formigoni
FI

The 2005 Lombard regional election took place on 3–4 April 2005. The 8th term of the Regional Council was chosen. Roberto Formigoni (Forza Italia) was re-elected for the third time in a row President, defeating Riccardo Sarfatti.

== Electoral system ==
Regional elections in Lombardy were ruled by the "Tatarella law" (approved in 1995), which provided for a mixed electoral system: four fifths of the regional councilors were elected in provincial constituencies by proportional representation, using the largest remainder method with a droop quota and open lists, while the residual votes and the unassigned seats were grouped into a "single regional constituency", where the whole ratios and the highest remainders were divided with the Hare method among the provincial party lists; one fifth of the council seats instead was reserved for regional lists and assigned with a majoritarian system: the leader of the regional list that scored the highest number of votes was elected to the presidency of the Region while the other candidates were elected regional councilors.

A threshold of 3% had been established for the provincial lists, which, however, could still have entered the regional council if the regional list to which they were connected had scored at least 5% of valid votes.

The panachage was also allowed: the voter can indicate a candidate for the presidency but prefer a provincial list connected to another candidate.

== Council apportionment ==
According to the official 2001 Italian census, the 64 Council seats which must be covered by proportional representation were so distributed between Lombard provinces.

BG	BS	CO	CR	LC	LO	MN	MI	MB	PV	SO	VA	total
7	8	4	2	2	1	3	21	5	4	1	6	64

It must be underlined that this allocation is not fixed. Remained seats and votes after proportional distribution, are all grouped at regional level and divided by party lists. The consequent division of these seats at provincial level usually change the original apportionment. Only 37 seats were directly assigned at provincial level, and the final distribution between provinces changed in this way.

BG	BS	CO	CR	LC	LO	MN	MI	MB	PV	SO	VA	total
+1	+1	-1	=	=	=	-1	+2	-1	-1	-1	=	-1

As it can be seen, the Province of Sondrio remained without representation.

== Parties and candidates ==
Political party or alliance	Constituent lists	Previous result		Candidate
Political party or alliance	Constituent lists	Votes (%)	Seats	Candidate
House of Freedoms	Forza Italia	33.8	24	Roberto Formigoni
House of Freedoms	Northern League	15.4	10	Roberto Formigoni
House of Freedoms	National Alliance	9.7	6	Roberto Formigoni
House of Freedoms	Union of Christian and Centre Democrats	4.1	2	Roberto Formigoni
House of Freedoms	New Italian Socialist Party	0.7	–	Roberto Formigoni
House of Freedoms	Laic Pole (Liberal Democrats–PRI–PLI)	—N/a	—N/a	Roberto Formigoni
The Union	The Olive Tree	22.0	20	Riccardo Sarfatti
The Union	Communist Refoundation Party	6.4	5	Riccardo Sarfatti
The Union	Party of Italian Communists	1.9	–	Riccardo Sarfatti
The Union	Pensioners' Party	1.6	1	Riccardo Sarfatti
The Union	Federation of the Greens	—N/a	—N/a	Riccardo Sarfatti
The Union	Italy of Values	—N/a	—N/a	Riccardo Sarfatti
Far-right coalition	Social Alternative (AS–FT–FSN–FN)	—N/a	—N/a	Gianmario Invernizzi
Far-right coalition	Lega Padana Lombardia	—N/a	—N/a	Gianmario Invernizzi
Far-right coalition	Pensions & Work	—N/a	—N/a	Gianmario Invernizzi

== Results ==
2005 election led to the return to the guide of the Region, for its third consecutive term, Communion and Liberation's Roberto Formigoni, supported by the center-right coalition.

If the mechanisms of electoral law generated a Regional Council very similar to the incumbent one, popular vote marked a significant reduction in the gap between the two sides, which was almost halved. The same plurality party, Forza Italia, decreased of more than four hundred preferences. The election was also the test for a list that led, within two years, to the national foundation of a new political entity, the Democratic Party.

The Olive Tree, an alliance comprising The Daisy and the Democrats of the Left, was the largest party in the region for the first time with the 27.1% of votes.

3–4 April 2005 Lombard regional election results
Candidates	Votes	%	Seats	Parties	Votes	%	Seat
Roberto Formigoni	2,841,883	53.86	16				
Roberto Formigoni	2,841,883	53.86	16	Forza Italia	1,137,621	25.95	18
Roberto Formigoni	2,841,883	53.86	16	Northern League – Lombard League	693,464	15.82	11
Roberto Formigoni	2,841,883	53.86	16	National Alliance	380,962	8.69	5
Roberto Formigoni	2,841,883	53.86	16	Union of Christian and Centre Democrats	166,761	3.80	2
Roberto Formigoni	2,841,883	53.86	16	New Italian Socialist Party	36,616	0.84	–
Roberto Formigoni	2,841,883	53.86	16	Laic Pole (Liberal Democrats–PRI–PLI)	11,196	0.26	–
Roberto Formigoni	2,841,883	53.86	16	Total	2,426,620	55.34	36
Riccardo Sarfatti	2,278,173	43.17	1				
Riccardo Sarfatti	2,278,173	43.17	1	The Olive Tree	1,186,848	27.07	19
Riccardo Sarfatti	2,278,173	43.17	1	Communist Refoundation Party	248,703	5.67	3
Riccardo Sarfatti	2,278,173	43.17	1	Federation of the Greens	128,060	2.92	2
Riccardo Sarfatti	2,278,173	43.17	1	Pensioners' Party	115,481	2.63	1 (Note: Pensioners gave a seat to Sarfatti.)
Riccardo Sarfatti	2,278,173	43.17	1	Party of Italian Communists	104,481	2.38	1
Riccardo Sarfatti	2,278,173	43.17	1	Italy of Values	61,431	1.40	1
Riccardo Sarfatti	2,278,173	43.17	1	Total	1,845,004	42.08	28
Gianmario Invernizzi	142,807	2.71	–				
Gianmario Invernizzi	142,807	2.71	–	Social Alternative (AS–FT–FSN–FN)	54,937	1.25	–
Gianmario Invernizzi	142,807	2.71	–	Lega Padana Lombardia	39,012	0.89	–
Gianmario Invernizzi	142,807	2.71	–	Pensions & Work	7,409	0.17	–
Gianmario Invernizzi	142,807	2.71	–	Total	101,358	2.31	–
Marco Marsili	14,008	0.27	–	Federation of Liberal Democrats	11,579	0.26	–
Total candidates	5,276,871	100.00	17	Total parties	4,384,561	100.00	63
Source: Ministry of the Interior – Historical Archive of Elections

Popular vote (party)
The Olive Tree	27.07%
FI	25.95%
LN	15.82%
AN	8.69%
PRC	5.67%
UDC	3.80%
FdV	2.92%
PP	2.63%
PdCI	2.38%
IdV	1.40%
AS	1.25%
Others	2.42%

Popular vote (coalition)
Formigoni	55.34%
Sarfatti	42.08%
Invernizzi	2.71%
Marsili	0.27%

=== Results by province ===
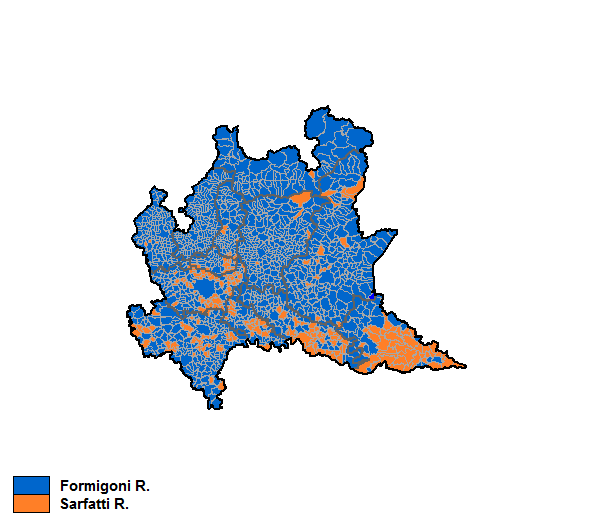
Election results map. Orange denotes municipalities won by Sarfatti and Blue denotes those won by Formigoni.

Province	Roberto Formigoni	Riccardo Sarfatti	Turnout
Milan	821,495 (48.74%)	814,934 (48.36%)	71.02%
Brescia	368,705 (56.90%)	253,080 (39.06%)	75.16%
Bergamo	347,263 (60.33%)	214,510 (37.27%)	74.52%
Varese	276,137 (58.39%)	184,599 (39.03%)	71.51%
Monza and Brianza	243,210 (54.49%)	193,080 (43.26%)	75.56%
Como	200,396 (62.06%)	113,623 (35.19%)	72.51%
Pavia	158,119 (52.65%)	130,671 (43.51%)	74.21%
Mantua	103,207 (45.93%)	116,766 (51.97%)	74.07%
Cremona	100,900 (50.45%)	91,718 (45.86%)	75.15%
Lecco	99,286 (53.54%)	79,452 (42.85%)	75.37%
Lodi	59,923 (50.19%)	55,364 (46.37%)	75.50%
Sondrio	63,242 (65.91%)	30,376 (31.66%)	64.02%

=== Results by capital city ===
City	Roberto Formigoni	Riccardo Sarfatti	Turnout
Milan	339,015 (49.80%)	326,009 (47.89%)	67.62%
Brescia	55,968 (50.76%)	51,312 (46.54%)	75.52%
Monza	37,170 (52.18%)	32,675 (45.89%)	74.08%
Bergamo	36,453 (54.73%)	29,072 (43.65%)	73.12%
Como	26,605 (56.56%)	19,291 (41.01%)	70.00%
Varese	26,594 (58.62%)	17,944 (39.55%)	68.95%
Pavia	22,852 (50.85%)	20,930 (46.58%)	77.88%
Cremona	18,937 (45.75%)	21,319 (51.50%)	73.22%
Mantua	11,639 (40.11%)	16,902 (58.25%)	75.52%
Lecco	13,961 (52.54%)	11,964 (44.85%)	72.71%
Lodi	13,495 (52.19%)	11,511 (44.52%)	78.18%
Sondrio	6,839 (56.60%)	4,993 (41.32%)	67.32%
