= Independentist Front Lombardy =

The Independentist Front Lombardy (Fronte Indipendentista Lombardia, FIL) was a padanist and separatist political party active in Lombardy.

Founded in 2006 by Max Ferrari and other splinters from Lega Lombarda–Lega Nord, FIL joined Lombardia Autonoma in 2008, but soon regained its autonomy as a markedly-separatist party. Ferrari chose to stay in Lombardia Autonoma, which had its name changed into "Lega Padana Lombardia", and finally returned in the League in 2010.

The party eventually re-emerged under the leadership of Piergiorgio Seveso in 2011, when it ran a candidate in the Varese municipal election, but gained a dismal 0.2% of the vote. Since 2012 the website is no more active.

== Leadership ==
- National secretary: Max Ferrari (2006–2008), Piergiorgio Seveso (2009–2011)
