= 2009 European Parliament election in Piedmont =

The European Parliament election of 2009 took place on 6–7 June 2009.

The People of Freedom (32.4%) was the largest party in Piedmont, ahead of the Democratic Party (24.7%) and Lega Nord (15.7%).

== Results ==
Party	votes	votes (%)
The People of Freedom	778,641	32.4
Democratic Party	592,960	24.7
Lega Nord	376,936	15.7
Italy of Values	209,107	8.7
Union of the Centre	147,365	6.1
Anticapitalist List (PRC–PdCI)	79,387	3.3
Bonino-Pannella List	75,614	3.1
Left and Freedom (MpS–Greens–PS)	55,881	2.3
Others	83,296	3.6
Total	2,402,273	100.0

Source: Ministry of the Interior
