= 2009 Montgomery mayoral special election =

- March 10, 2009
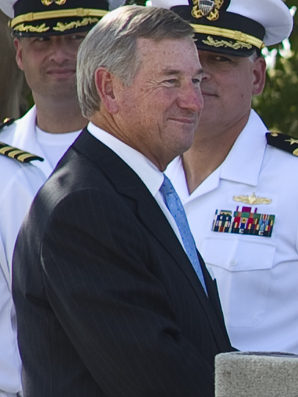

Candidate	Todd Strange	Michael Briddell	Willie "Democrat" Cook
Party	nonpartisan candidate	nonpartisan candidate	nonpartisan candidate
Popular vote	20,448	12,644	2,312
Percentage	52.92%	32.72%	5.98%
Candidate	Scott Simmons
Party	nonpartisan candidate
Popular vote	2,067
Percentage	5.34%
Mayor before election
Charles Jinright (acting)
Elected mayor
Todd Strange
Republican

The 2009 Montgomery mayoral special election took place on March 10, 2009, to elect the Mayor of Montgomery, Alabama. It saw the election of Todd Strange.

The election was triggered by the resignation of mayor Bobby Bright, who resigned in order to take a seat he was elected to in the United States House of Representatives.

The election was officially nonpartisan. Had no candidate received a majority of the vote, a runoff election would have been held between the top two candidates.

== Results ==
Results
Party	Candidate	Votes	%
Nonpartisan	Todd Strange	20,448	52.92
Nonpartisan	Michael Briddell	12,644	32.72
Nonpartisan	Willie "Democrat" Cook	2,312	5.98
Nonpartisan	Scott Simmons	2,067	5.34
Nonpartisan	Jon Dow	870	2.25
Nonpartisan	Jay King	296	0.76
Total votes		38,637	
