= 2009 Valais Grand Council election =

The 2009 election to the Grand Council was held in the canton of Valais, Switzerland, on 1 March 2009. All 130 members of the Grand Council were elected for four-year terms.

The centre-right maintained its control on the canton, with the Christian Democratic People's Party remaining by far the largest party, with 54 seats: down four from 2005. The classical liberal Free Democratic Party and the Social Democratic Party each lost two seats, leaving them on 28 and 17 respectively. The Christian Social Party gained one seat, tying them with the Social Democrats on 17 overall. The main winners were the national conservative Swiss People's Party, who doubled their number of seats to twelve. The Green Party added one seat, winning two overall.

After the election, the two overtly Christian parties, the centre-right Christian Democratic People's Party and centre-left Christian Social Party, formed a bloc in the Grand Council together, which gives them an outright majority. However, the three members of the Christian Social Party from French-speaking Lower Valais, rejected the alliance, and joined the Social Democrats and Greens in the 'Alliance of the Left' (French: Alliance de Gauche).

== Results ==
Summary of the 1 March 2009 Valais Grand Council election results
Party	Ideology	Seats	Seats ±
Christian Democratic People's Party	Christian democracy	54	–4
FDP.The Liberals	Classical liberalism	28	–2
Social Democratic Party	Social democracy	17	–2
Christian Social Party	Christian left	17	+1
Swiss People's Party	National conservatism	12	+6
Green Party	Green politics	2	+1
Total (turnout 54.57%)		130	–
Source: Canton of Valais Archived 2011-06-10 at the Wayback Machine
