= 2009 New York state elections =

- November 3, 2009

New York held various elections in 2009.

== Federal ==
=== 20th congressional district special election ===
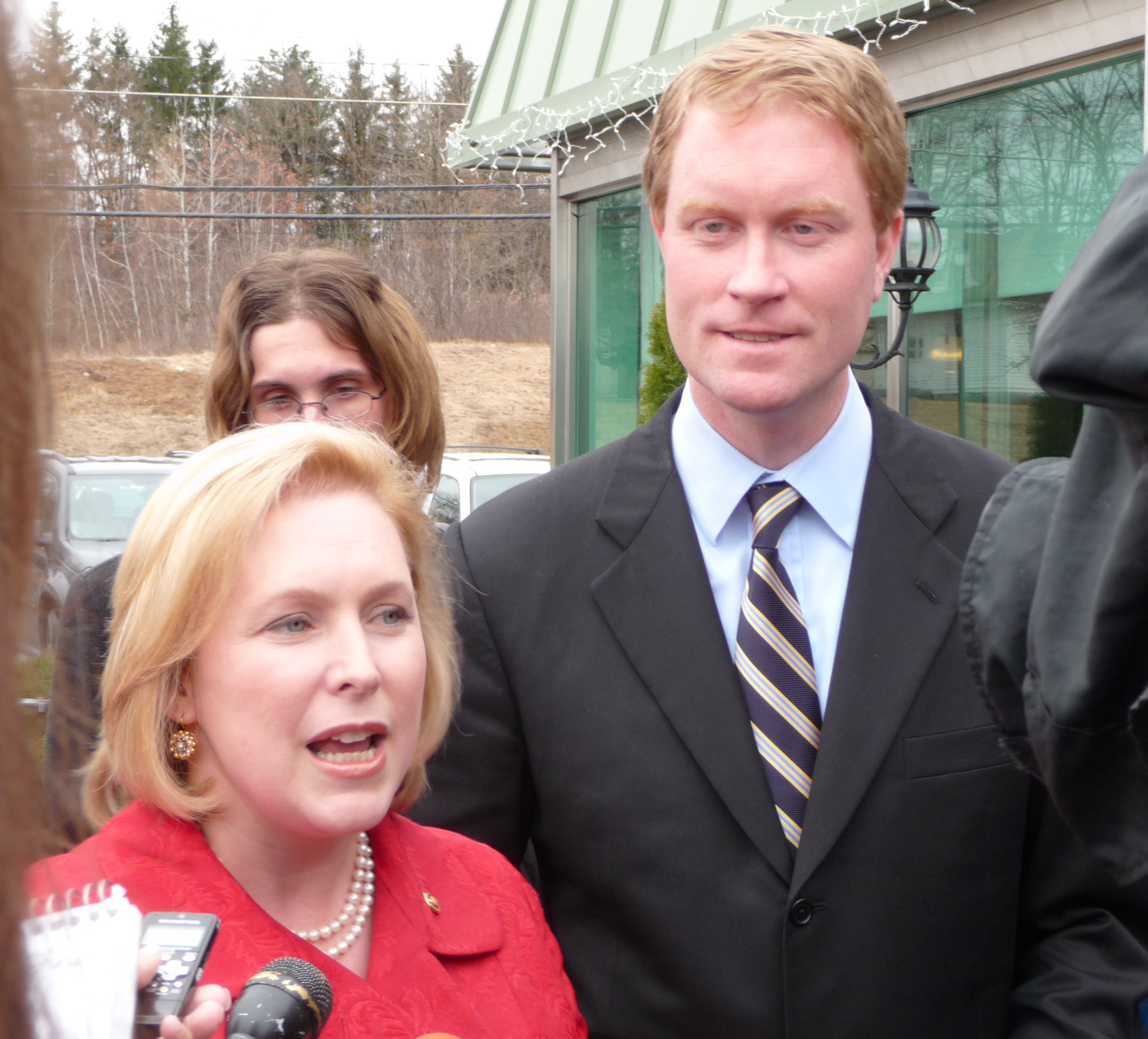
New York junior Senator Kirsten Gillibrand (D) on a campaign stop with Congressional candidate Scott Murphy (D) at a diner in Brunswick, New York during the 2009 special election for the 20th congressional district of New York. New York Governor David Paterson replaced former Senator Hillary Clinton with Senator Gillibrand (the former Congresswoman from New York's 20th congressional district) upon her accession of the office of United States Secretary of State in the Obama administration. Murphy won that election and represented New York's 20th congressional district in the United States House of Representatives until he was beat by challenger Chris Gibson in 2010.

Kirsten Gillibrand was appointed to the United States Senate, replacing Hillary Clinton, who resigned to become United States Secretary of State. A special election was held to fill her House seat on March 31, with Republican James Tedisco and Democrat Scott Murphy the two candidates. After the two finished in a near tie on election night, absentee ballots turned up a 700-vote margin for Murphy, despite the ballots being sent out to far more Republicans than Democrats. Murphy won the seat.

=== 23rd congressional district special election ===
John M. McHugh was nominated to become United States Secretary of the Army, necessitating a special election to fill his seat. Democratic candidate Bill Owens won the special election on November 3, 2009, defeating the Conservative candidate Doug Hoffman and the Republican candidate Dierdre Scozzafava, which as a result, marks the first time that a Democrat represented parts of this district since the Civil War.

== Cities ==
=== Albany ===
Albany Mayor Gerald Jennings was re-elected to a fifth term, defeating City Councilman Corey Ellis (who ran as a Working Families Party candidate) and Republican Nathan Lebron.

=== Buffalo ===
Democratic incumbent Buffalo Mayor Byron Brown was re-elected to a second term, defeating Councilmember Michael P. Kearns.

=== New York City ===
New York City Mayor Mike Bloomberg won a third term as mayor. There were also citywide races for Public Advocate, and Comptroller.

=== Rochester ===
Democratic incumbent Robert Duffy ran unopposed for mayor and was re-elected for a second term.

=== Syracuse ===
Democratic incumbent Matt Driscoll was term-limited. Democrat Stephanie Miner defeated Republican Steve Kimatian and became Syracuse's first female mayor.
