= 2009 Sri Lanka Central and North Western Provincial Council elections =

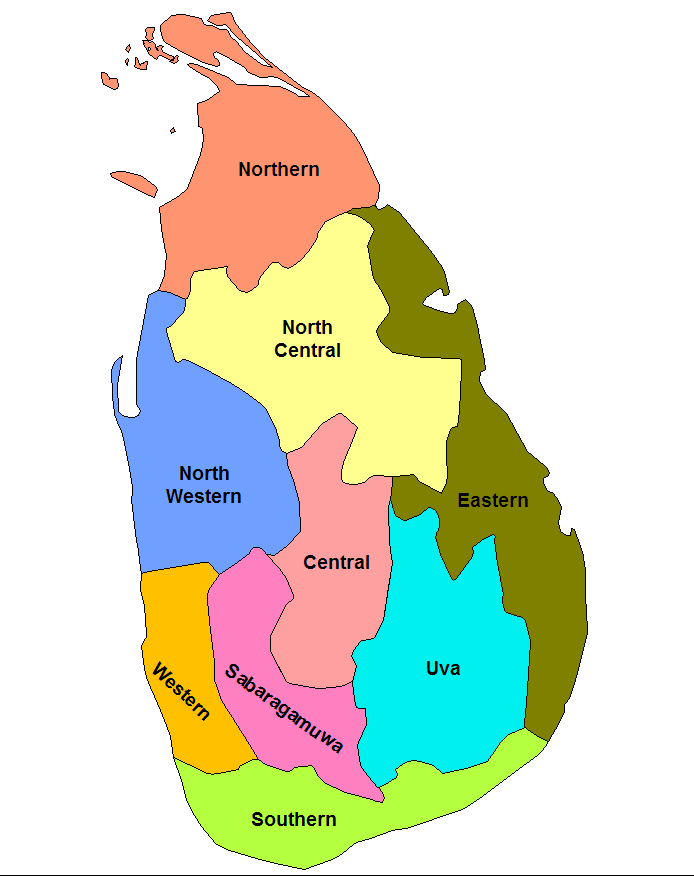
Elections will be held in February for two of the nine provinces in the country

The Sri Lanka provincial council elections, 2009 were held on February 14, 2009 to elect members to Sri Lanka’s Central Provincial Council and North Western Provincial Council. The 2 councils were dissolved by their respective governors at midnight on December 8, 2008. The Elections Commission subsequently accepted nominations from December 24 to December 31, and set the date for the polls.

A total of 1,746,449 people were eligible to vote in the Central Province, along with 1,661,733 in the North Western Province. They elected 56 and 50 members for the councils respectively. By the close of nominations, 1320 candidates from 15 political parties and 26 independent groups registered to contest the Central Provincial Council, and 937 candidates from 15 political parties and 17 independent groups filed nominations for the North Western Provincial Council.

Buoyed by support for his handling of the Sri Lankan Civil War, Sri Lankan President Mahinda Rajapakse's United People's Freedom Alliance achieved resounding victories in all 5 districts. This included the districts of Kandy and Nuwara Eliya, which are traditionally seen as strongholds of the opposition United National Party.

== Past elections ==
In the last election held to elect members to the Central Provincial Council, the United People's Freedom Alliance secured a majority in the council, obtaining 426,297 votes and 30 seats as opposed to 410,145 votes and 26 seats for the United National Party. The UPFA also secured a majority in the North Western Provincial Council, obtaining 491,000 votes and 31 seats with 311,773 votes and 19 seats going to the UNP.

== Contesting political parties ==
=== Parties contesting in all 5 districts ===
Political Party	Symbol	Mahanuwara	Matale	Nuwara Eliya	Kurunegala	Puttalam
United People's Freedom Alliance	Betel Leaf	Y	Y	Y	Y	Y
United National Party	Elephant	Y	Y	Y	Y	Y
Janatha Vimukthi Peramuna	Bell	Y	Y	Y	Y	Y
Patriotic National Front	Flag	Y	Y	Y	Y	Y

=== Parties contesting in 4 districts ===
Political Party	Symbol	Mahanuwara	Matale	Nuwara Eliya	Kurunegala	Puttalam
Eksath Lanka Maha Sabha	Fountain Pen	Y	Y	Y	Y	*
Nationals Peoples Party	Electric Bulb	Y	Y	Y	-	Y
Ruhunu Janatha Party	Motor Car	Y	Y	Y	-	Y
Sri Lanka Progressive Front	Flower Vase	Y	Y	-	Y	Y
Sinhalaye Mahasammatha Bhoomiputra Pakshaya	Aeroplane	*	Y	Y	Y	Y

=== Parties contesting in 3 districts ===
Political Party	Symbol	Mahanuwara	Matale	Nuwara Eliya	Kurunegala	Puttalam
United National Alliance	Swan	-	Y	-	Y	Y
United Socialist Party	Try-shaw	Y	-	Y	-	Y
Jathika Sangwardena Peramuna	Coconut	*	Y	Y	-	Y

=== Parties contesting in 2 districts ===
Political Party	Symbol	Mahanuwara	Matale	Nuwara Eliya	Kurunegala	Puttalam
Eksath Lanka Podujana Pakshaya	Cup	-	Y	Y	*	-
Left Front	Table	-	Y	Y	*	-
Socialist Equality Party	Pair of Scissors	-	-	Y	-	Y

=== Parties contesting in only 1 districts ===
Political Party	Symbol	Mahanuwara	Matale	Nuwara Eliya	Kurunegala	Puttalam
The Liberal Party	Book	-	-	Y	-	-

* - indicates nominations were submitted, but rejected by the Elections Commission

== Results ==
=== Central Province ===
Summary of the February 14, 2009 Sri Lanka Central Provincial Council election results
Party	Kandy		Matale		Nuwara Eliya		Seats			Popular Vote	
Party	Votes	Seats	Votes	Seats	Votes	Seats	2004	2009	+/−	Vote	%
United People's Freedom Alliance	363,490	18	140,295	7	146,418	9	30	^{[1]}36	+6	650,203	59.53%
United National Party	237,827	12	56,009	3	128,289	7	26	22	−4	422,125	38.65%
Total	643,617	30	218,406	10	309,666	16	58	58	0	1,167,336	100%
Voter turnout: 66.84%
Source: Sri Lanka Department of Elections Archived 2012-02-19 at the Wayback Machine Notes: 1. Includes 2 bonus seats

=== North Western Province ===
Summary of the February 14, 2009 Sri Lanka North Western Provincial Council election results
Party	Kurunegala		Puttalam		Seats			Popular Vote	
Party	Votes	Seats	Votes	Seats	2004	2009	+/−	Vote	%
United People's Freedom Alliance	497,366	24	171,377	11	31	^{[1]}37	+6	668,743	69.43%
United National Party	193,548	9	76,799	5	19	14	−5	270,347	28.07%
Janatha Vimukthi Peramuna	16,084	1	4,344	0	^{[2]}0	1	+1	20,428	2.12%
Total	735,846	34	274,014	16	52	52	0	1,009,860	100%
Voter turnout: 60.77%
Source: Sri Lanka Department of Elections Notes: 1. Includes 2 bonus seats; 2. Contested in 2004 as part of the UPFA

== See also ==
- Sri Lanka Provincial Council elections, 2008/09
