= 2009 Al Muthanna governorate election =

2009 Muthanna Governorate election
← 2005	31 January 2009	Next →

All 26 seats for the Muthanna Governorate council
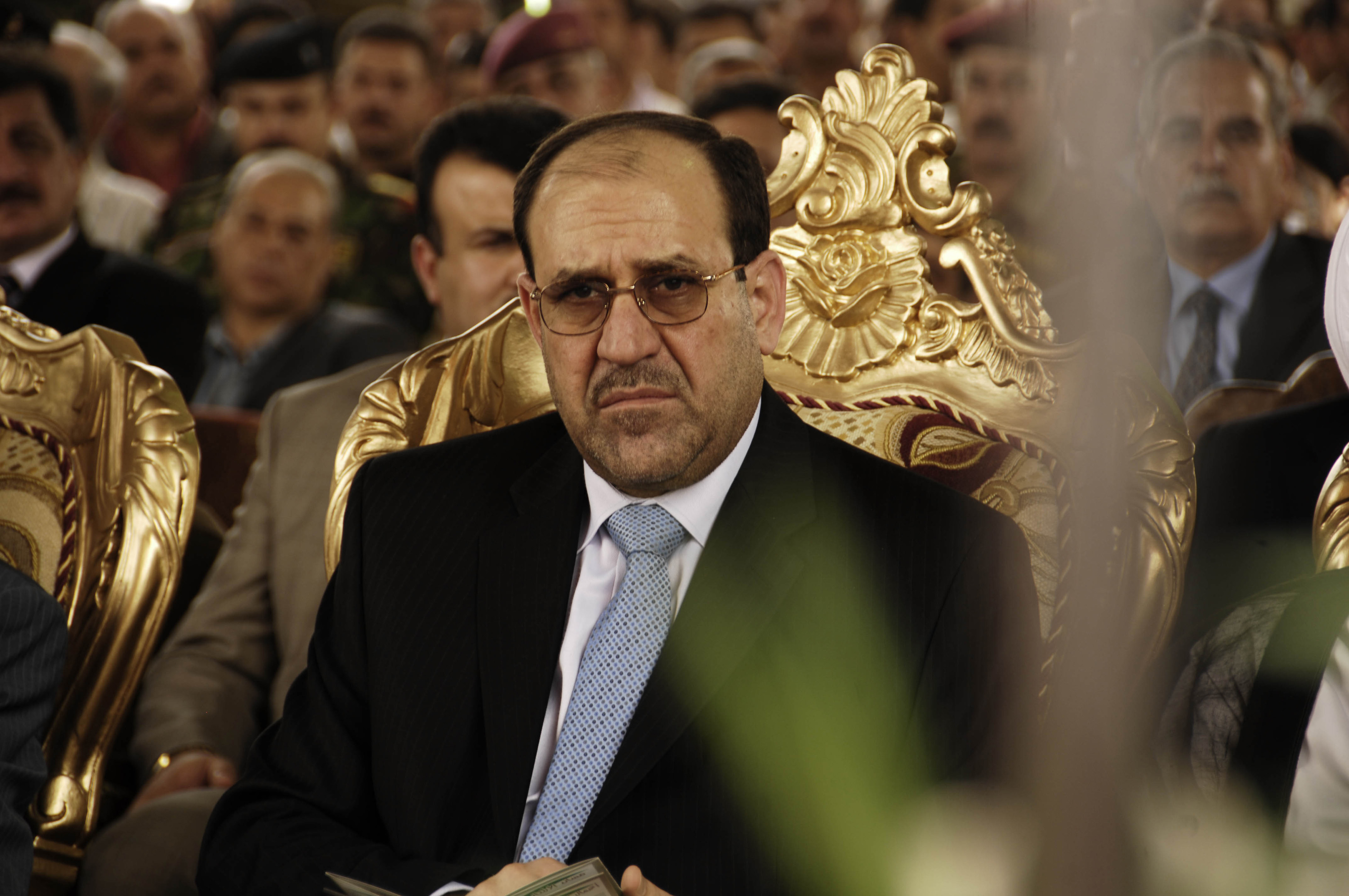

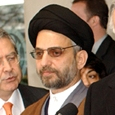

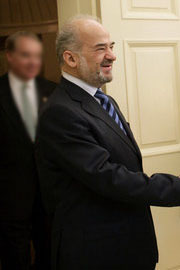
	First party	Second party
Leader	Nouri al-Maliki	Abdul Aziz al-Hakim
Party	State of Law	Al-Mehraab Martyr List
Last election	4	8
Seats before	4	8
Seats won	5	5
Seat change	▲1	▼3
Popular vote	22,627	19,448
Percentage	10.89%	9.36%
Swing	▲3.18%	▼4.45%
	Third party	Fourth party
Leader		Ibrahim al-Jaafari
Party	Al-Jmour	National Reform Trend
Last election	0	0
Seats before	0	0
Seats won	3	4
Seat change	▲93	▲4
Popular vote	14,520	12,878
Percentage	6.99%	6.20%
Swing	▲6.99%	▲6.20%
Governor of Muthanna before election
Ahmad Marzouq Salal
Islamic Dawa Party
Subsequent Governor
Ibrahim Salman al-Mayali
Al-Mehraab Martyr List

The Al Muthanna governorate election of 2009 was held on 31 January 2009 alongside elections for all other governorates outside Iraqi Kurdistan and Kirkuk.

== Results ==
Summary of the 31 January 2009 al Muthanna governorate election results
Coalition 2005/2009	Allied national parties	Leader	Seats (2005)	Seats (2009)	Change	Votes
State of Law Coalition	Islamic Dawa Party	Nouri Al-Maliki	4	5	+1	22,627
Al Mihrab Martyr List	ISCI	Abdul Aziz al-Hakim	8	5	-3	19,448
Al-Jmour			–	3	+3	14,520
National Reform Trend	National Reform Trend	Ibrahim al-Jaafari	–	3	+3	12,878
Independent Free Movement List	Sadrist Movement	Muqtada al-Sadr	–	2	+2	11,436
Gathering for Muthana			4	2	-2	10,867
Independent National List			–	2	+2	9,854
Independent Iraqi Skills Gathering			–	2	+2	8,941
Middle Euphrates Gathering			–	2	+2	8,322
Islamic Virtue Party	Islamic Vertue Party	Abdelrahim Al-Husseini	6	–	-6	7,500
Iraqi National List	Iraqi National Accord		3	–	-3	6,897
Iraqi Communist Party	Iraqi Communist Party		2	–	-2	2,517
Al-Furat Al-Aswat Assembly			6	–	-6	
Islamic Independence Society			5	–	-5	
Allegiance Coalition			3	–	-3	
Other Parties						71,936
Total			41	26	-15	207,752
Sources: this article – al Sumaria – New York Times -
