= 2009 Sulaymaniyah governorate election =

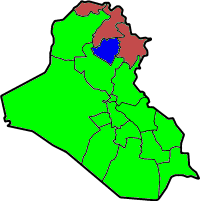
Provinces elected in January are Green; Kirkuk is Blue and Iraqi Kurdistan is Red

Governorate or provincial elections are due to be held in Sulaymaniya Governorate in 2009 to replace the governorate council elected in the Iraqi governorate elections of 2005. The remaining governorates outside Iraqi Kurdistan held elections on 31 January 2009. The election will follow the 2009 Iraqi Kurdistan legislative election.
