= 2009 Botswana local elections =

Local elections in Botswana were held on 16 October 2009 for the district councils of the Districts of Botswana. Local government is administered by nine district and five town councils. District commissioners have executive authority.

== Overall Results ==
Party	Seats	+/-
Botswana Democratic Party	333	▼3
Botswana National Front	71	▼35
Botswana Congress Party	69	▲37
Botswana Alliance Movement	6	▼3
Botswana People's Party	3	▼1
Independents	8	▲5
Total	490	0
Registered Voters	724,205	
Total Voters (Voter Turnout)	553,384 (76.4%)	
Invalid Votes	12,765	
Total Valid Votes	540,619	

== Results By District ==
=== Central District ===
Party	Seats	+/-
Botswana Democratic Party	108	▼20
Botswana Congress Party	16	▲10
Botswana National Front	10	▲6
Botswana Alliance Movement	0	▼1
Independents	6	▲5
Total	140	0
Registered Voters	209,911	
Total Voters (Voter Turnout)	154,584 (73.6%)	
Invalid Votes	4,523	
Total Valid Votes	150,061	

=== Francistown City ===
Party	Seats	+/-
Botswana Democratic Party	11	▼5
Botswana Congress Party	7	▲5
Botswana People's Party	0	▼1
Independents	1	▲1
Total	19	0
Registered Voters	32,913	
Total Voters (Voter Turnout)	23,685 (72.0%)	
Invalid Votes	331	
Total Valid Votes	23,384	

=== Gaborone City ===
Party	Seats	+/-
Botswana Democratic Party	22	▲11
Botswana Congress Party	7	▲4
Botswana National Front	1	▼15
Total	30	0
Registered Voters	63,201	
Total Voters (Voter Turnout)	48,337 (76.5%)	
Invalid Votes	360	
Total Valid Votes	47,977	

=== Ghanzi District ===
Party	Seats	+/-
Botswana Democratic Party	15	▲2
Botswana National Front	4	▼3
Botswana Congress Party	1	▲1
Total	20	0
Registered Voters	17,284	
Total Voters (Voter Turnout)	13,837 (80.1%)	
Invalid Votes	433	
Total Valid Votes	13,404	

=== Jwaneng ===
Party	Seats	+/-
Botswana National Front	4	▼3
Botswana Democratic Party	3	▲3
Total	7	0
Registered Voters	5,849	
Total Voters (Voter Turnout)	4,568 (78.1%)	
Invalid Votes	51	
Total Valid Votes	4,517	

=== Kgalagadi District ===
Party	Seats	+/-
Botswana Democratic Party	13	3
Botswana National Front	9	3
Total	22	0
Registered Voters	22,509	
Total Voters (Voter Turnout)	18,680 (83.0%)	
Invalid Votes	376	
Total Valid Votes	18,304	

=== Kgatleng District ===
Party	Seats	+/-
Botswana Democratic Party	8	▼2
Botswana National Front	8	0
Botswana Congress Party	6	▲1
Independents	1	▲1
Total	20	0
Registered Voters	35,846	
Total Voters (Voter Turnout)	29,766 (83.0%)	
Invalid Votes	608	
Total Valid Votes	29,158	

There was a tie in one constituency and a by-election was on 5 December 2009. The Botswana Democratic Party (BDP) candidate won, increasing their total seats from 7 to 8.

=== Kweneng District ===
Party	Seats	+/-
Botswana Democratic Party	48	▲1
Botswana National Front	9	▼8
Botswana Congress Party	9	▲7
Total	66	0
Registered Voters	99,563	
Total Voters (Voter Turnout)	76,124 (76.5%)	
Invalid Votes	1,990	
Total Valid Votes	74,134	

=== Lobatse ===
Party	Seats	+/-
Botswana Democratic Party	8	▲4
Botswana National Front	4	▼4
Total	12	0
Registered Voters	13,404	
Total Voters (Voter Turnout)	10,029 (74.8%)	
Invalid Votes	142	
Total Valid Votes	9,887	

=== North-East District ===
Party	Seats	+/-
Botswana Democratic Party	16	0
Botswana People's Party	3	0
Total	19	0
Registered Voters	21,470	
Total Voters (Voter Turnout)	16,267 (75.8%)	
Invalid Votes	326	
Total Valid Votes	15,941	

=== North-West District ===
Party	Seats	+/-
Botswana Democratic Party	29	▼2
Botswana Congress Party	8	▲3
Botswana Alliance Movement	6	▼2
Botswana National Front	3	▲2
Independents	0	▼1
Total	46	0
Registered Voters	68,381	
Total Voters (Voter Turnout)	51,916 (75.9%)	
Invalid Votes	1,285	
Total Valid Votes	50,631	

=== Selibe Phikwe ===
Party	Seats	+/-
Botswana Democratic Party	7	▼2
Botswana Congress Party	7	▲2
Total	14	0
Registered Voters	20,560	
Total Voters (Voter Turnout)	16,220 (78.9%)	
Invalid Votes	153	
Total Valid Votes	16,067	

=== South-East District ===
Party	Seats	+/-
Botswana Democratic Party	11	▼1
Botswana Congress Party	7	▲4
Botswana National Front	2	▼3
Total	20	0
Registered Voters	27,005	
Total Voters (Voter Turnout)	21,985 (81.4%)	
Invalid Votes	302	
Total Valid Votes	21,683	

=== Southern District ===
Party	Seats	+/-
Botswana Democratic Party	34	▲8
Botswana National Front	17	▲7
Botswana Congress Party	1	0
Independents	0	▼1
Total	52	0
Registered Voters	86,309	
Total Voters (Voter Turnout)	67,386 (78.1%)	
Invalid Votes	1,885	
Total Valid Votes	65,501	
