= 2009 El Paso mayoral election =

El Paso mayoral election, 2009
- May 14, 2009
- Turnout: 8.87%
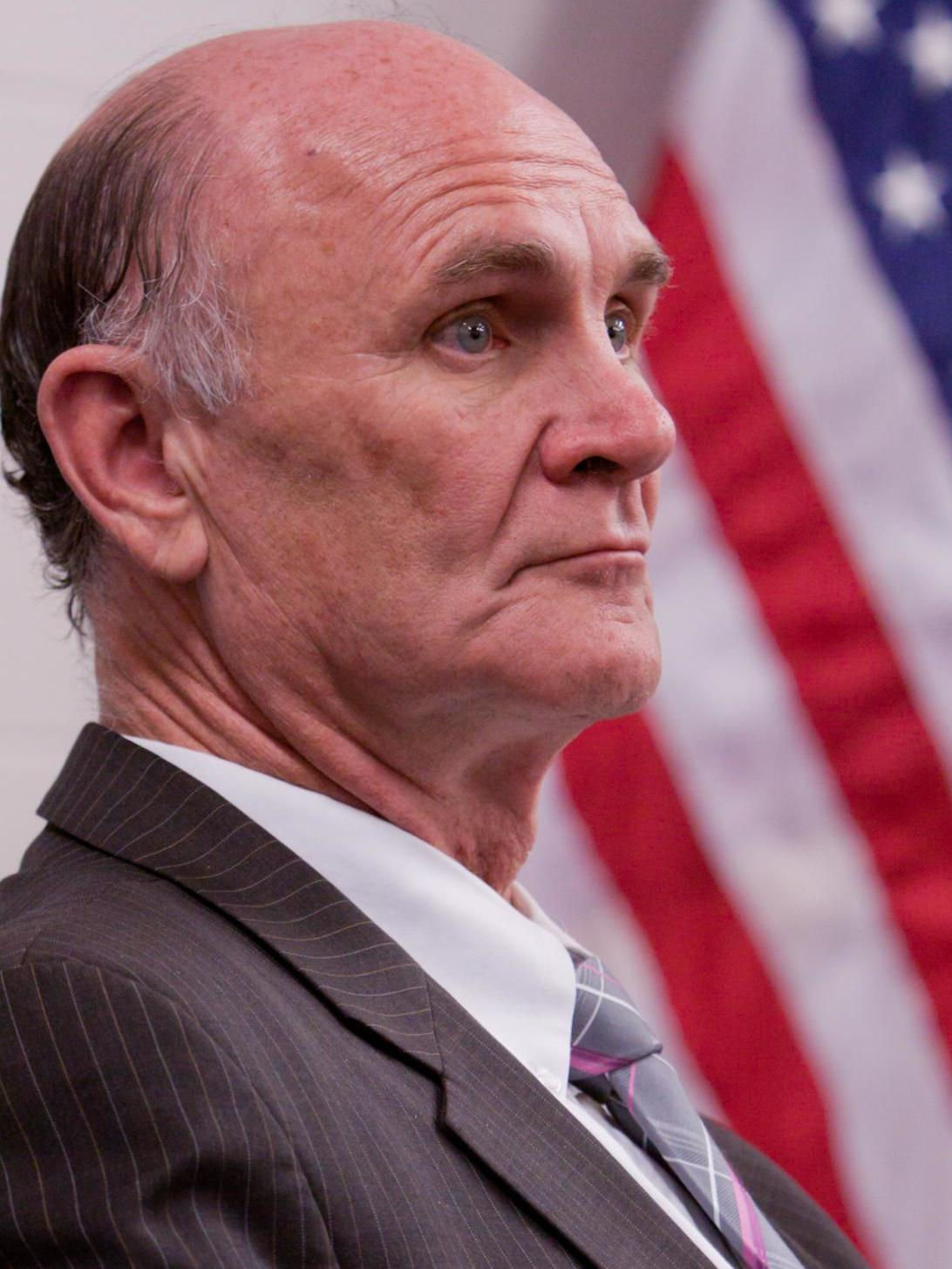

Candidate	John Cook	Gus Haddad	Carlos Rivera
Party	Nonpartisan	Nonpartisan	Nonpartisan
Popular vote	18,731	8,483	1,767
Percentage	61.20%	27.72%	5.77%
Mayor before election
John Cook
Democratic
Elected mayor
John Cook
Democratic

The 2009 El Paso mayoral election was held on May 14, 2009, to elect the mayor of El Paso, Texas. It saw the reelection of incumbent mayor John Cook.

No runoff was required, as Cook secured a majority of the vote in the initial round.

== Results ==
Results
Party	Candidate	Votes	%
Nonpartisan	John Cook (incumbent)	18,731	61.20
Nonpartisan	Gus Haddad	8,483	27.72
Nonpartisan	Carlos Rivera	1,767	5.77
Nonpartisan	Alfrank Catucci	769	2.51
Nonpartisan	David E. Henderson	529	1.73
Nonpartisan	Lee Mendez	1,767	5.77
Total votes		30,604	
