= November 2009 San Francisco general election =

The November 2009 San Francisco general elections were held on November 3, 2009, in San Francisco, California. The elections included those for San Francisco city attorney and treasurer, and five ballot measures.

The most contentious ballot measure, Proposition D, was a proposal to allow billboard advertisements on part of Market Street. San Francisco voters rejected the measure.

== City attorney ==
Two-term incumbent Dennis Herrera won reelection unopposed.

San Francisco City Attorney election, 2009
Candidate	Votes	%
Dennis Herrera (incumbent)	78,414	96.84
Write-in	2,555	3.16
Valid votes	80,969	79.33%%
Invalid or blank votes	21,092	20.67
Total votes	102,061	100.00
Turnout	{{{votes}}}	22.58%

== Treasurer ==
One-term incumbent José Cisneros, who was initially appointed by Mayor Gavin Newsom in September 2004, won reelection unopposed.

San Francisco Treasurer election, 2009
Candidate	Votes	%
José Cisneros (incumbent)	76,376	97.07
Write-in	2,304	2.93
Valid votes	78,680	77.09%
Invalid or blank votes	23,381	22.91
Total votes	102,061	100.00
Turnout	{{{votes}}}	22.58%

== Propositions ==
Note: "City" refers to the San Francisco municipal government.

=== Proposition A ===

Proposition A would change the budget cycle from a one-year system to a two-year system, require the city to adopt and prepare a five-year financial plan and long-range policies, and change deadlines for submitting and adopting labor agreements.

Proposition A
Choice	Votes	%
For	68,270	69.89
Against	29,414	30.11
Total	97,684	100.00
Valid votes	97,684	95.71
Invalid/blank votes	4,377	4.29
Total votes	102,061	100.00
Registered voters/turnout		22.58

=== Proposition B ===

Proposition B would allow members of the San Francisco Board of Supervisors to hire more than two aides.

Proposition B
Choice	Votes	%
For	51,835	52.26
Against	47,361	47.74
Total	99,196	100.00
Valid votes	99,196	97.19
Invalid/blank votes	2,865	2.81
Total votes	102,061	100.00
Registered voters/turnout		22.58

=== Proposition C ===

Proposition C would allow the city to enter into a new naming rights contract for Candlestick Park and devote half of the proceeds to City recreation center directors.

Proposition C
Choice	Votes	%
For	58,192	58.68
Against	40,973	41.32
Total	99,165	100.00
Valid votes	99,165	97.16
Invalid/blank votes	2,896	2.84
Total votes	102,061	100.00
Registered voters/turnout		22.85

=== Proposition D ===

Proposition D would create a Mid-Market Special Sign District, permitting new general advertising signs with some restrictions.

Proposition D
Choice	Votes	%
For	46,008	46.00
Against	53,999	54.00
Total	100,007	100.00
Valid votes	100,007	97.99
Invalid/blank votes	2,054	2.01
Total votes	102,061	100.00
Registered voters/turnout		22.85

=== Proposition E ===

Proposition E would prohibit new general advertising signs on street furniture and City-owned buildings.

Proposition E
Choice	Votes	%
For	56,802	57.28
Against	42,365	42.72
Total	99,167	100.00
Valid votes	99,167	97.16
Invalid/blank votes	2,894	2.84
Total votes	102,061	100.00
Registered voters/turnout		22.85
