= 2009 Duhok governorate election =

Iraqi election 2009

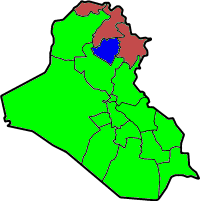
Provinces elected in January are Green; Kirkuk is Blue and Iraqi Kurdistan is Red

Governorate or provincial elections were originally slated to be held in the Duhok Governorate in 2009 to replace the council elected in 2005. While 14 of Iraq's 18 governorates held elections on 31 January 2009, the three governorates of the Kurdistan Region—Duhok, Erbil, and Sulaymaniyah—postponed their provincial polls due to administrative and legislative delays between the regional and federal governments.

== Background and Postponement ==
The 2009 Iraqi provincial elections excluded the Kurdistan Region and the disputed territory of Kirkuk. While provincial council votes were delayed, the region did hold the 2009 Kurdistan Region parliamentary election on 25 July 2009. In Duhok, the Kurdistan Democratic Party (KDP) maintained its traditional dominance, though the election saw the emergence of the Gorran Movement as a major opposition force across the region.

== Long-term Impact (2014–2026) ==
The provincial councils in the Kurdistan Region were not refreshed until the 2014 Kurdistan Region provincial elections. Following that cycle, further provincial elections were repeatedly delayed. By early 2026, the political landscape in Duhok was further influenced by the results of the 2024 Kurdistan Region parliamentary election, where the KDP remained the leading party in the governorate despite significant gains by the Patriotic Union of Kurdistan (PUK) in other regions.

As of February 2026, Duhok continues to face administrative challenges related to Article 140 and disputed territories. Recent local governance has been impacted by federal-regional disputes over district status and budget allocations for infrastructure projects in the province.

== See also ==
- 2009 Iraqi governorate elections
- 2014 Kurdistan Region provincial elections
- 2024 Kurdistan Region parliamentary election
