= 2009 Dayton mayoral election =

- November 8, 2009

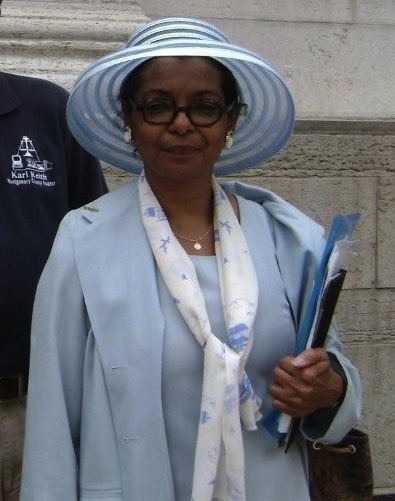
Candidate	Gary Leitzell	Rhine McLin
Party	Nonpartisan	Nonpartisan
Popular vote	15,316	14,434
Percentage	51.48%	48.52%
Mayor before election
Rhine McLin
Nonpartisan
Elected mayor
Gary Leitzell
Nonpartisan

The 2009 Dayton mayoral election took place on November 3, 2009. Incumbent Mayor Rhine McLin ran for re-election to a third term. She was challenged by community activist Gary Leitzell. Though the race was formally nonpartisan, McLin was supported by local Democrats, and Leitzell, an independent, was endorsed by the Montgomery County Republican Party.

McLin was endorsed for re-election by the Dayton Daily News, which praised her "good instincts" and for being "intuitive about what won't sit well with citizens and the unintended consequences of decisions that could disadvantage Dayton." It noted that although she "isn't a natural spokesperson" and "struggles to be a force in the room and in the wider community," she "is more astute than many give her credit for." And while it gave Leitzell "credit for making the race," he "is not ready."

Ultimately, Leitzell narrowly defeated McLin, winning 51 percent of the vote to her 49 percent, and beating her by a margin of just 882 votes.

== General election ==
=== Candidates ===
- Rhine McLin, incumbent Mayor
- Gary Leitzell, community activist

=== Results ===
2009 Dayton mayoral election results
Party	Candidate	Votes	%
Nonpartisan	Gary Leitzell	15,316	51.48%
Nonpartisan	Rhine McLin (inc.)	14,434	48.52%
Total votes		29,750	100.00%
