= 2009 Allentown mayoral election =

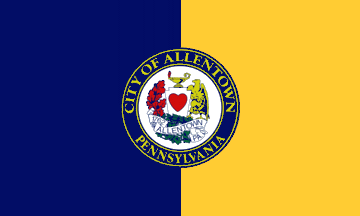
- November 3, 2009
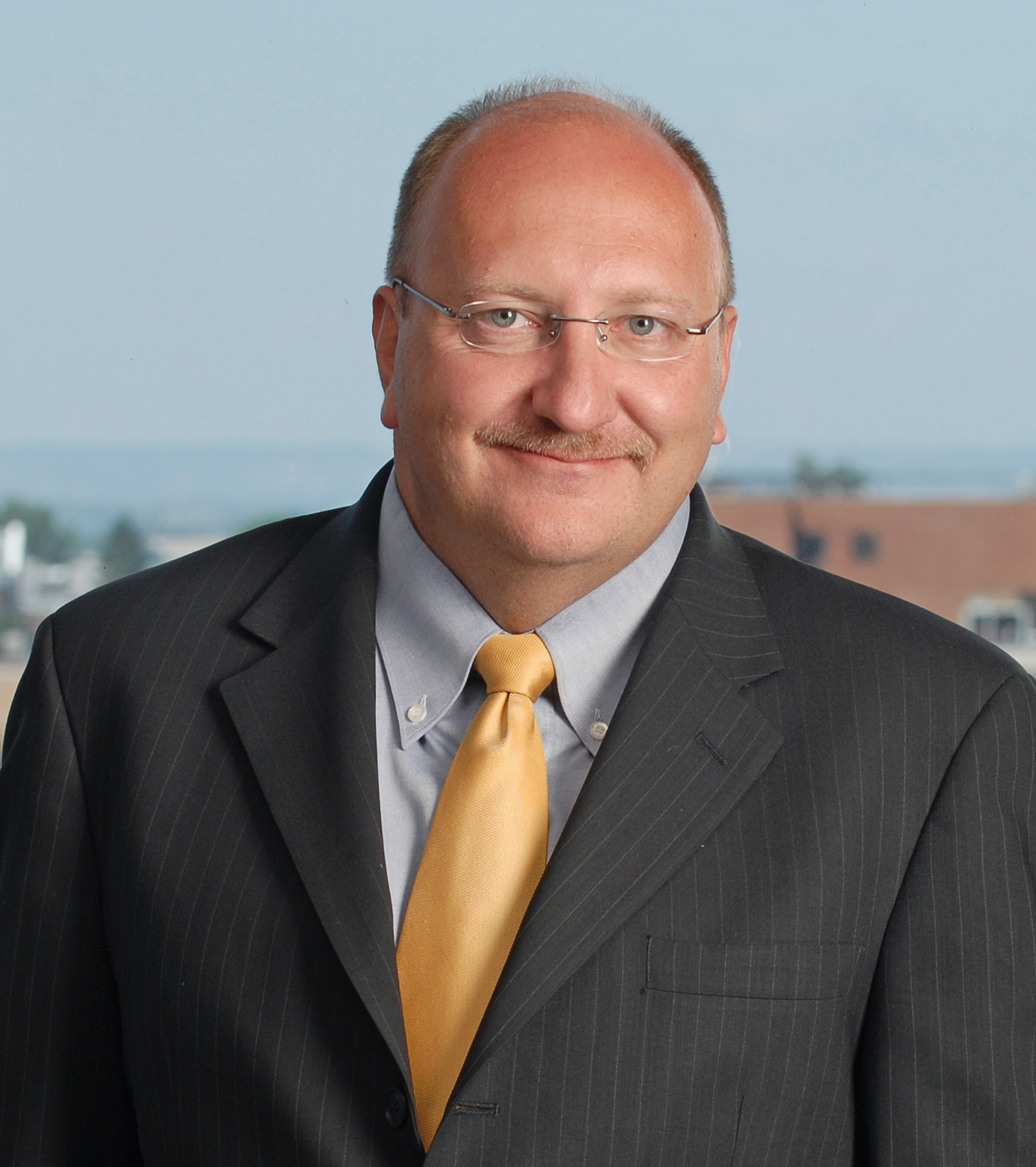

Candidate	Ed Pawlowski	Tony Phillips
Party	Democratic	Republican
Popular vote	7,908	2,837
Percentage	73.60%	26.40%
Mayor before election
Ed Pawlowski
Democratic
Elected mayor
Ed Pawlowski
Democratic

The 2009 mayoral election in Allentown, Pennsylvania was held on November 3, 2009, and resulted in the incumbent mayor Ed Pawlowski, a member of the Democratic Party, being re-elected to a second term over Republican Party candidate Tony Phillips.

== Background ==
Incumbent mayor Ed Pawlowski was seeking his second term as mayor, having first been elected in the previous election in 2005.

== Campaign ==
Pawlowski would be challenged in the Democratic primary by longtime city employee and former follower Dick Nepon. He would handily defeat Nepon with almost 82% of the vote. Pawlowski's followers also attempted to write him in as the Republican nominee in an effort to cross-file Pawlowski to forego the general election. However, this effort would fail and Tony Phillips would secure the Republican nomination. It is unknown how many write-ins Pawlowski received as a Republican as they were pooled into his total as a Democratic candidate. Pawlowski would go on to defeat Phillips in the general election with almost 74% of the vote.

== Results ==
Mayor of Allentown, Democratic primary, May 19, 2009.
Party	Candidate	Votes	%
Democratic	Ed Pawlowski (incumbent)	2,583	81.74%
Democratic	Dick Nepon	577	18.26%
Total votes		3,160	100.00%

Mayor of Allentown, Republican primary, May 19, 2009.
Party	Candidate	Votes	%
Republican	Tony Phillips	1,150	100%
Total votes		1,150	100.00%

Mayor of Allentown, November 3, 2009.
Party	Candidate	Votes	%
Democratic	Ed Pawlowski (incumbent)	7,908	73.60%
Republican	Tony Phillips	2,837	26.40%
Total votes		10,745	100.00%

== See also ==
- 2009 United States elections
- Mayors of Allentown, Pennsylvania
