= 2003 Quebec municipal elections =

- November 2, 2003

The Canadian province of Quebec held municipal elections in 465 communities on November 2, 2003. Some results from these elections are included on this page.

== Bécancour ==
2003 Bécancour municipal election: Mayor
Candidate	Votes	%
(x)Maurice Richard	acclaimed	.
Source: Biography: Maurice Richard, National Assembly of Quebec, accessed 14 May 2011.

== Bedford ==
2003 Bedford election, Mayor of Bedford
Candidate	Total votes	% of total votes
(incumbent)Claude Dubois	610	66.89
Richard Morin	160	17.54
Simon Gnocchini	142	15.57
Total valid votes	912	100.00

Source: "Eastern Townships Municipal Elections Results," Sherbrooke Record, 3 November 2003, p. 7.
