= 2009 Curaçao status referendum =

15 May 2009
- I approve the result of the Round Table Conference to achieve an autonomous Curaçao within the Kingdom

Results
Choice	Votes	%
Yes	41,433	51.99%
No	38,261	48.01%
Valid votes	79,694	99.97%
Invalid or blank votes	26	0.03%
Total votes	79,720	100.00%
Registered voters/turnout	118,827	67.09%

A status referendum was held in Curaçao on 15 May 2009. The referendum was on whether to accept the proposed agreement on becoming an autonomous country within the Kingdom of the Netherlands as part of the dissolution of the Netherlands Antilles. It was approved by 51.99% of voters.

== Results ==
Choice	Votes	%
For	41,433	51.99
Against	38,261	48.01
Total	79,694	100.00
Valid votes	79,694	99.97
Invalid/blank votes	26	0.03
Total votes	79,720	100.00
Registered voters/turnout	118,827	67.09
Source: Direct Democracy
