= 2009 Baghdad governorate election =

2009 Baghdad Governorate election
- 31 January 2009

All 57 seats for the Baghdad Governorate council
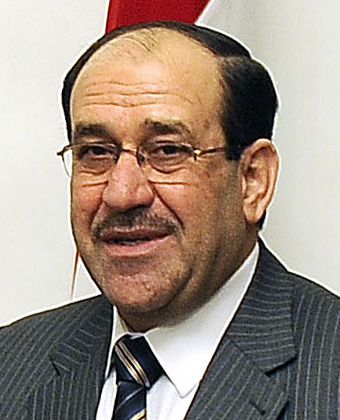

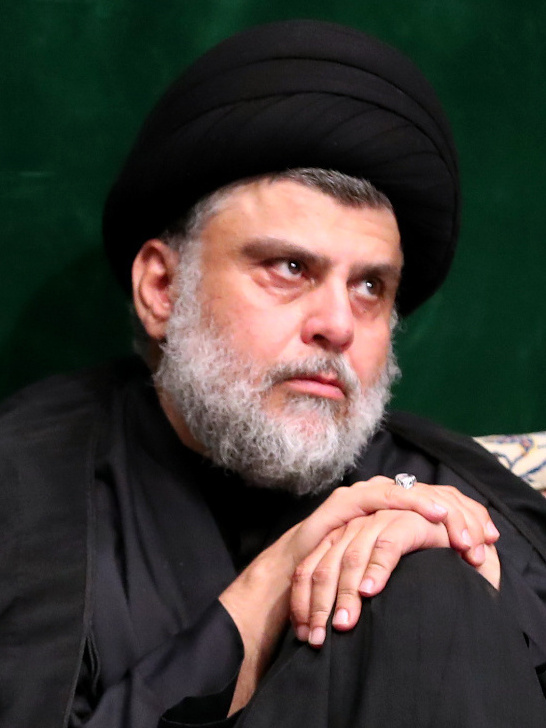

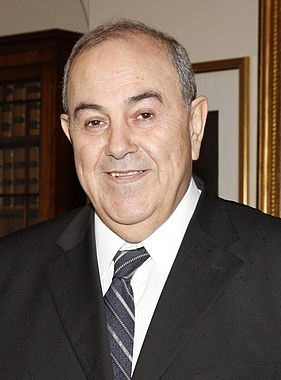
	First party	Second party
Leader	Nouri al-Maliki	Ayad al-Samarrai
Party	State of Law	Tawafuq
Last election	11	0
Seats before	11	0
Seats won	28	7
Seat change	▲17	▲7
Popular vote	641,925	153,219
Percentage	37.9%	9%
Swing	▲22.8%	▲9%
	Third party	Fourth party
Leader	Muqtada al-Sadr	Ayad Allawi
Party	Sadrist Movement	INL
Last election	1	0
Seats before	1	0
Seats won	5	5
Seat change	▲4	▲5
Popular vote	151,093	148,133
Percentage	8.9%	8.7%
Swing	▲6.9%	▲8.7%
Governor of Baghdad before election
Hussein al-Tahan
ISCI
Subsequent Governor
Salah Abd al-Razzaq
State of Law

The Baghdad governorate election of 2009 was held on 31 January 2009 alongside elections for all other governorates outside Iraqi Kurdistan and Kirkuk.

== Background ==
Two seats in Baghdad are reserved for minority religions: one for Christians and one for Sabians. Over 3,000 candidates contested the 57 seats.

== Campaign ==
A candidate for the Iraqi Islamic Party was killed outside his home in the al-Ameriya district.

== Results ==
Sunni Arab residents of the Fadel district complained that they felt it was dangerous registering to vote because the office was in a neighbouring area that was Shiite dominated and they had to pass through two checkpoints. Many voters in that district were reported to have been turned away as they were not registered and turnout was less than 30%.

The Iraqi National List of former Prime Minister Ayad Allawi was said to have won most support in Fadel along with the Iraqi Communist Party. A local Sahwa official and former 1920 Revolution Brigade member said he knew former al-Qaeda in Iraq fighters who had voted for the INL.

In March, the State of Law Coalition said it would ally with the Iraqi National Dialogue Front.

Party	Votes	%	Seats	+/–
State of Law Coalition	641,925	37.87	28	+17
Tawafuq	153,219	9.04	7	+7
Sadrist Movement	151,093	8.91	5	+4
Iraqi National List	148,133	8.74	5	+5
Hiwar	113,787	6.71	4	+4
Al Mihrab Martyr List	91,759	5.41	3	−25
National Reform Trend	71,663	4.23	3	+3
Islamic Virtue Party	22,921	1.35	0	−6
Ishtar Patriotic List	4,334	0.26	1	+1
Reserved Sabian seat	241	0.01	1	+1
Other parties	295,855	17.46	0	–
Total	1,694,930	100.00	57	+6
Source: Niqash, IHEC

== See also ==
- Assyrian politics in Iraq#Iraqi Governorate Elections 2009
