= 2009 Bedford municipal election =

The 2009 Town of Bedford municipal election took place on November 1, 2009, to elect a mayor and councillors in the town of Bedford, Quebec. Incumbent mayor Claude Dubois was returned without opposition.

== Results ==
2009 Bedford election, Mayor of Bedford
Candidate	Total votes	% of total votes
(incumbent)Claude Dubois	accl.	.

- Claude Dubois was president of the Missisquoi County Fair before running for public office. He was first elected as mayor of Bedford in 2003 and was re-elected without opposition in 2005 and 2009.

2009 Bedford election, Councillor, District One
Candidate	Total votes	% of total votes
Alain Lacoste	370	41.62
(incumbent)Katherine Greenwood	313	35.21
Claire Brault	206	23.17
Total valid votes	889	100.00

2009 Bedford election, Councillor, District Two
Candidate	Total votes	% of total votes
(incumbent)Luc Gnocchini	681	76.60
Bernard Dufour	208	23.40
Total valid votes	889	100.00

- Luc Gnocchini was first elected to the Bedford town council in 2003. He was re-elected in 2005 and 2009. The latter election was the first time he faced opposition.

2009 Bedford election, Councillor, District Three
Candidate	Total votes	% of total votes
(incumbent)Madeleine Fortin	377	41.94
Christelle Bogosta	276	30.70
Yvette Lapointe	246	27.36
Total valid votes	899	100.00

- Madeleine Campbell Fortin was first elected to the Bedford town council in 1987. She has served on the health and social services network of Brome—Missisquoi. She also has been president of the school committee of Notre-Dame-de-Stanbridge and a board member of CLSC La Pommeraie.

2009 Bedford election, Councillor, District Four
Candidate	Total votes	% of total votes
(incumbent)Tommy Gladu	accl.	

2009 Bedford election, Councillor, District Five
Candidate	Total votes	% of total votes
Claude Jetté	717	81.38
François Samray	164	18.62
Total valid votes	881	100.00

2009 Bedford election, Councillor, District Six
Candidate	Total votes	% of total votes
(incumbent)Mona Beaulac	accl.	

Source: Official Results, Government of Quebec.
