= 2009 European Parliament election in Italy =

- 6 and 7 June 2009

72 seats to the European Parliament
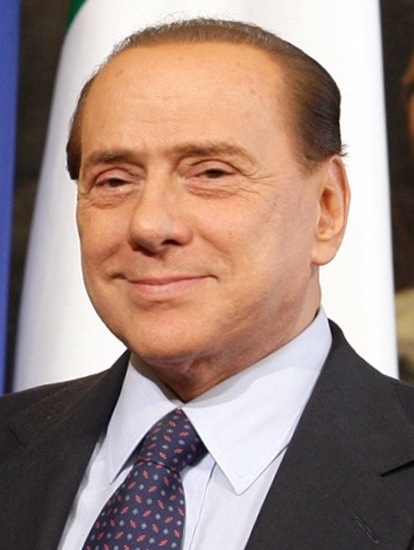

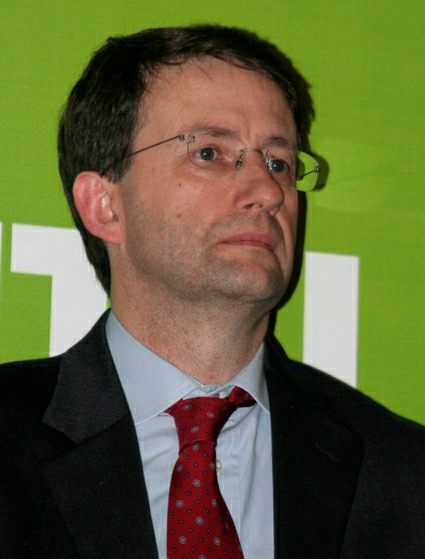

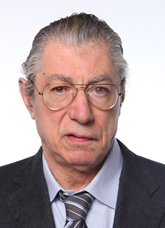

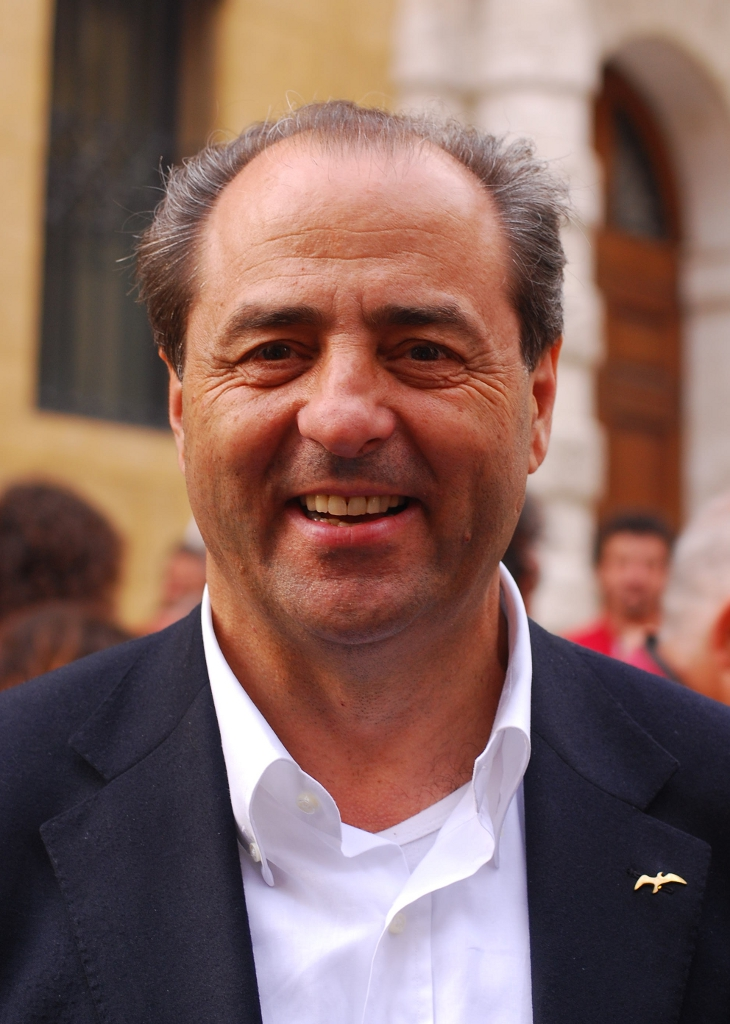

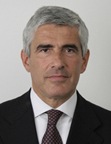

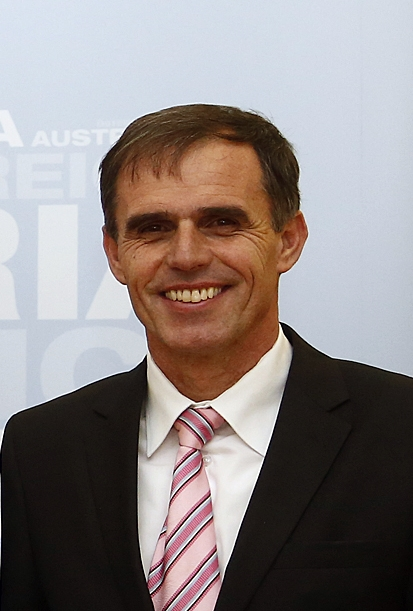
	First party	Second party	Third party
Leader	Silvio Berlusconi	Dario Franceschini	Umberto Bossi
Party	People of Freedom	Democratic Party	Northern League
Alliance	EPP	S&D	EFD
Leader since	18 January 1994	16 February 2009	4 December 1989
Last election	32.4%, 25 seats	31.1%, 24 seats	5.0%, 4 seats
Seats won	29	21	9
Seat change	▲4	▼3	▲5
Popular vote	10,797,296	7,999,476	3,126,915
Percentage	35.3%	26.1%	10.2%
Swing	▲2.9%	▼5.0%	▲5.2%
	Fourth party	Fifth party	Sixth party
Leader	Antonio Di Pietro	Pier Ferdinando Casini	Richard Theiner
Party	IdV	UDC	SVP
Alliance	ALDE	EPP	EPP
Leader since	21 March 1998	18 January 1994 (as CCD)	18 April 2009
Last election	2.1%, 2 seats	5.9%, 5 seats	0.5%, 1 seat
Seats won	5	5	1
Seat change	▲5	0	0
Popular vote	2,450,643	1,995,021	143,509
Percentage	8.0%	6.5%	0.5%
Swing	▲5.8%	▲0.6%	0
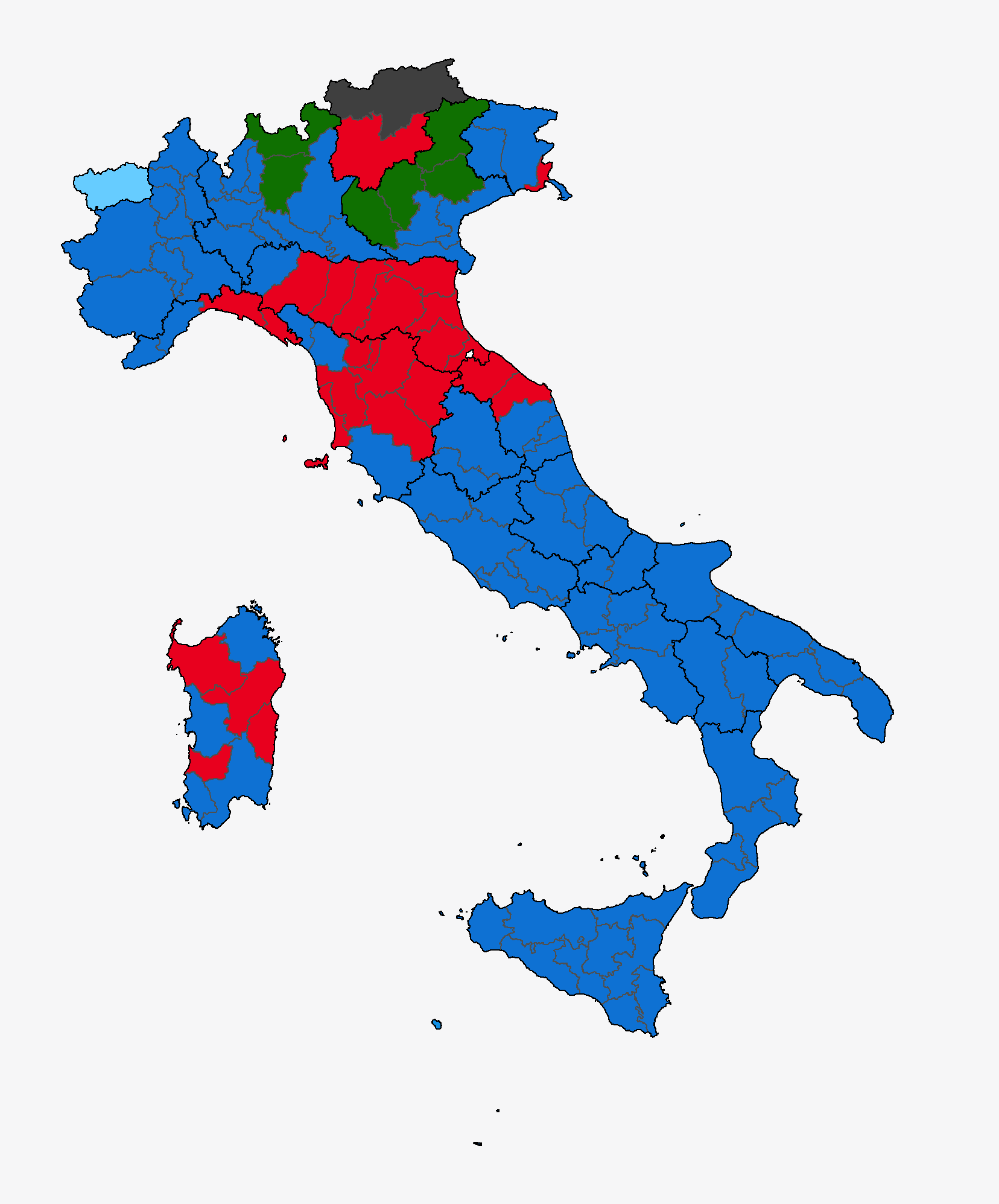
- Major parties in each province

The 2009 European Parliament election in Italy was held on Saturday 6 and Sunday 7 June 2009, as decided by the Italian government on 18 December 2008. Italy elected 72 members of the European Parliament (MEPs).

== Electoral system ==
The party-list proportional representation was the traditional electoral system of the Italian Republic from its establishment in 1946 to 1994, therefore it was also adopted to elect the Italian members of the European Parliament (MEPs) since 1979. Two levels were introduced: a national level to divide the seats among parties and a constituency level to distribute them among candidates in open lists. Five constituencies were established, each including 2–5 Italian regions and each electing a fixed number of MEPs. At national level, seats are divided between party lists using the largest remainder method with Hare quota. Seats are allocated to parties and then to their most voted candidates.

In the run-up of the election, the Italian Parliament introduced a national electoral threshold of 4% in the electoral law for the European Parliament. An exception was granted for parties representing some linguistic minorities as such lists can be connected with one of the major parties, combining their votes, provided that those parties reach the 4% threshold and that candidates from minority parties obtain a sufficient number of votes, no less than 50,000 for the main candidate.

=== Constituencies ===
Seats are allocated to party lists on a national basis using an electoral quota, with the residue given to the lists with the largest excess over whole quotas. An electoral quota is then calculated for each list and used to allocate seats to each list in each of the five electoral regions.

Electoral Region	Administrative Regions	Seats
North-West	Aosta Valley, Liguria, Lombardy, Piedmont	21
North-East	Emilia-Romagna, Friuli-Venezia Giulia, Trentino-Alto Adige/Südtirol, Veneto	15
Central	Latium, Marche, Tuscany, Umbria	15
Southern	Abruzzo, Apulia, Basilicata, Calabria, Campania, Molise	15
Islands	Sardinia, Sicily	6

== Main parties and leaders ==
=== Outgoing MEPs ===
This is a list of Italian delegations sitting at the European Parliament before 6 June 2009.

EP Group	Seats	Party	MEPs
European People's Party–European Democrats	24 / 78		
European People's Party–European Democrats	24 / 78	Forza Italia	20
European People's Party–European Democrats	24 / 78	Union of the Centre	2
European People's Party–European Democrats	24 / 78	Pensioners' Party	1
European People's Party–European Democrats	24 / 78	South Tyrolean People's Party	1
Socialist Group	21 / 78		
Socialist Group	21 / 78	Democratic Party (former DS)	12
Socialist Group	21 / 78	Socialist Party	4
Socialist Group	21 / 78	Democratic Left	3
Socialist Group	21 / 78	Independents	2
Union for Europe of the Nations	13 / 78		
Union for Europe of the Nations	13 / 78	National Alliance	8
Union for Europe of the Nations	13 / 78	Northern League	3
Union for Europe of the Nations	13 / 78	The Right	1
Union for Europe of the Nations	13 / 78	Independent	1
Alliance of Liberals and Democrats for Europe	7 / 78		
Alliance of Liberals and Democrats for Europe	7 / 78	Democratic Party (former DL)	4
Alliance of Liberals and Democrats for Europe	7 / 78	Bonino List	2
Alliance of Liberals and Democrats for Europe	7 / 78	Party of the South	1
European United Left–Nordic Green Left	7 / 78		
European United Left–Nordic Green Left	7 / 78	Communist Refoundation Party	5 (Note: Including two MEPs of Movement for the Left.)
European United Left–Nordic Green Left	7 / 78	Party of Italian Communists	2 (Note: Including one MEP of Unite the Left.)
Greens–European Free Alliance	2 / 78	Federation of the Greens	2
Non-Inscrits	3 / 78		
Non-Inscrits	3 / 78	Tricolour Flame	1
Non-Inscrits	3 / 78	New Force	1
Non-Inscrits	3 / 78	Independent	1

=== Summary of parties ===
In the following table the main parties/lists participating in the election are listed.

Party	Main ideology	Leader	European Party	Seats
The People of Freedom	Liberal conservatism	Silvio Berlusconi	EPP	28 / 78
Democratic Party	Social democracy	Dario Franceschini	None	16 / 78
Left and Freedom (Note: List composed of Movement for the Left, Unite the Left, Democratic Left, Socialist Party and Federation of the Greens.)	Eco-socialism	Several	PES; EGP	9 / 78
Communist Refoundation – Italian Communists	Communism	Several	PEL	4 / 78
Northern League	Regionalism	Umberto Bossi	None	3 / 78
Union of the Centre	Christian democracy	Pier Ferdinando Casini	EPP	2 / 78
Bonino-Pannella List	Radicalism	Marco Pannella	ALDE	2 / 78
The Autonomy (Note: List composed of Movement for the Autonomies, The Right, Pensioners' Party and Alliance of the Centre.)	Several	Several	Libertas	2 / 78
South Tyrolean People's Party	Regionalism	Richard Theiner	EPP	1 / 78
Tricolour Flame	Neo-fascism	Luca Romagnoli	None	1 / 78
New Force	Neo-fascism	Roberto Fiore	None	1 / 78
Italy of Values	Anti-corruption politics	Antonio Di Pietro	ALDE	0 / 78
Aosta Valley (Note: List composed of Valdostan Union, Edelweiss and Autonomist Federation.)	Regionalism	Several	None	0 / 78

== Results ==
The parties that passed the national electoral threshold at 4% were The People of Freedom (PdL), Democratic Party (PD), Northern League (LN), Italy of Values (IdV), and Union of the Centre (UdC). This election was a victory for the Prime Minister Silvio Berlusconi: the parties supporting his government (the PDL and LN) won 38 seats, while the opposition (PD, IdV, and UdC) obtained 34 seats. On 1 December 2009, after the entry into force of the Treaty of Lisbon, the Italian seats in the European Parliament increased from 72 to 73. The additional seat was assigned to the UdC, going from 5 to 6 seats.

← Summary of the 6 and 7 June 2009 European Parliament election results in Italy →
Party	Votes	%	+/–	Seats	+/–
The People of Freedom (PdL)	10,797,296	35.26	1.35 ▲	29 / 72	4 ▲
Democratic Party (PD)	7,999,476	26.12	4.96 ▼	21 / 72	3 ▼
Northern League (LN)	3,126,181	10.21	5.25 ▲	9 / 72	5 ▲
Italy of Values (IdV)	2,450,643	8.00	5.86 ▲	7 / 72	5 ▲
Union of the Centre (UdC)	1,995,021	6.51	0.62 ▲	5 / 72	0
Communist Refoundation – Italian Communists (PRC–PdCI)	1,037,862	3.39	5.09 ▼	0 / 72	7 ▼
Left and Freedom (SeL)	957,822	3.13	–	0 / 72	2 ▼
Bonino-Pannella List (LBP)	743,284	2.43	0.18 ▲	0 / 72	2 ▼
The Autonomy	681,290	2.22	–	0 / 72	1 ▼
Tricolour Flame (FT)	246,403	0.80	0.07 ▲	0 / 72	1 ▼
Workers' Communist Party (PCL)	166,531	0.54	New	0 / 72	New
New Force (FN)	147,343	0.48	–	0 / 72	0
South Tyrolean People's Party (SVP)	143,509	0.47	0.02 ▲	1 / 72	0
Liberal Democrats – MAIE (LD–MAIE)	71,067	0.23	New	0 / 72	New
Aosta Valley (VdA)	32,913	0.11	–	0 / 72	0
Autonomy Liberty Democracy (ALD)	27,199	0.09	New	0 / 72	New
Valid votes	30,623,840	92.79			
Blank and Invalid votes	2,125,164	7.21			
Totals	32,749,004	100.00	—	0 / 72	6 ▼
Electorate and voter turnout	50,342,153	65.05			
Source: Ministry of the Interior

Popular vote
PdL	35.3%
PD	26.1%
LN	10.2%
IdV	8.0%
UdC	6.5%
PRC-PdCI	3.4%
SeL	3.1%
LBP	2.4%
AUT	2.2%
Others	2.8%

=== Distribution by European group ===
European Parliament group	Seats	National party	Seats
European People's Party Group	35 / 72	The People of Freedom (PdL)	29
European People's Party Group	35 / 72	Union of the Centre (UdC)	5
European People's Party Group	35 / 72	South Tyrolean People's Party (SVP)	1
Progressive Alliance of Socialists and Democrats	21 / 72	Democratic Party (PD)	21
Europe of Freedom and Democracy	9 / 72	Northern League (LN)	9
Alliance of Liberals and Democrats for Europe Group	7 / 72	Italy of Values (IdV)	7

== See also ==
- 2009 European Parliament election in Aosta Valley
- 2009 European Parliament election in Friuli-Venezia Giulia
- 2009 European Parliament election in Lombardy
- 2009 European Parliament election in Piedmont
- 2009 European Parliament election in Sardinia
- 2009 European Parliament election in Sicily
- 2009 European Parliament election in Trentino-Alto Adige/Südtirol
