= The Autonomy =

Italian electoral coalition

The Autonomy L'Autonomia
- Leader: Francesco Storace; Raffaele Lombardo; Carlo Fatuzzo; Francesco Pionati
- Founded: 2009
- Dissolved: 2009
- Ideology: Conservatism; Christian democracy Regionalism; Sicilian autonomy
- Political position: Right-wing
- European Parliament (2009): 0

The Autonomy (Italian: L'Autonomia) was a heterogeneous electoral coalition of political parties in Italy, formed in the run-up to the 2009 European Parliament election in order to overcome the 4% threshold introduced in the electoral law in February 2009. The list was affiliated to Libertas.eu and disbanded after the European election.

The list included:

- The Right (LD, national-conservative, leader: Francesco Storace), including Sicilian Alliance
- Movement for the Autonomies (MpA, regionalist/Christian-democratic, leader: Raffaele Lombardo)
- Pensioners' Party (PP, conservative/pensioners' interests, leader: Carlo Fatuzzo)
- Alliance of the Centre (AdC, Christian-democratic, leader: Francesco Pionati)
- candidates of minor regionalist parties: Max Ferrari (Lombardia Autonoma), Carlo Andreotti (Autonomist Trentino), Diego Volpe Pasini (S.O.S. Italy).
- disgruntled former members of Forza Italia: Vittorio Sgarbi, Francesco Musotto, Eleonora Lo Curto, Monica Stefania Baldi, Paolo Ricciotti, etc.

The alliance between The Right and the MpA was made possible also by the common views on Sicilian autonomy of Raffaele Lombardo, leader of the MpA and President of Sicily, and Nello Musumeci, MEP for The Right and formerly leader of Sicilian Alliance, an autonomist party. Nello Musumeci and Carlo Fatuzzo, leader of the PP, were the only two outgoing MEPs of the coalition.

Tricolour Flame was also to have been part of the coalition, but declined.
