= Bonino-Pannella List =

Libertarian and progressive electoral list formed by the Italian Radicals

Bonino-Pannella List Lista Bonino-Pannella
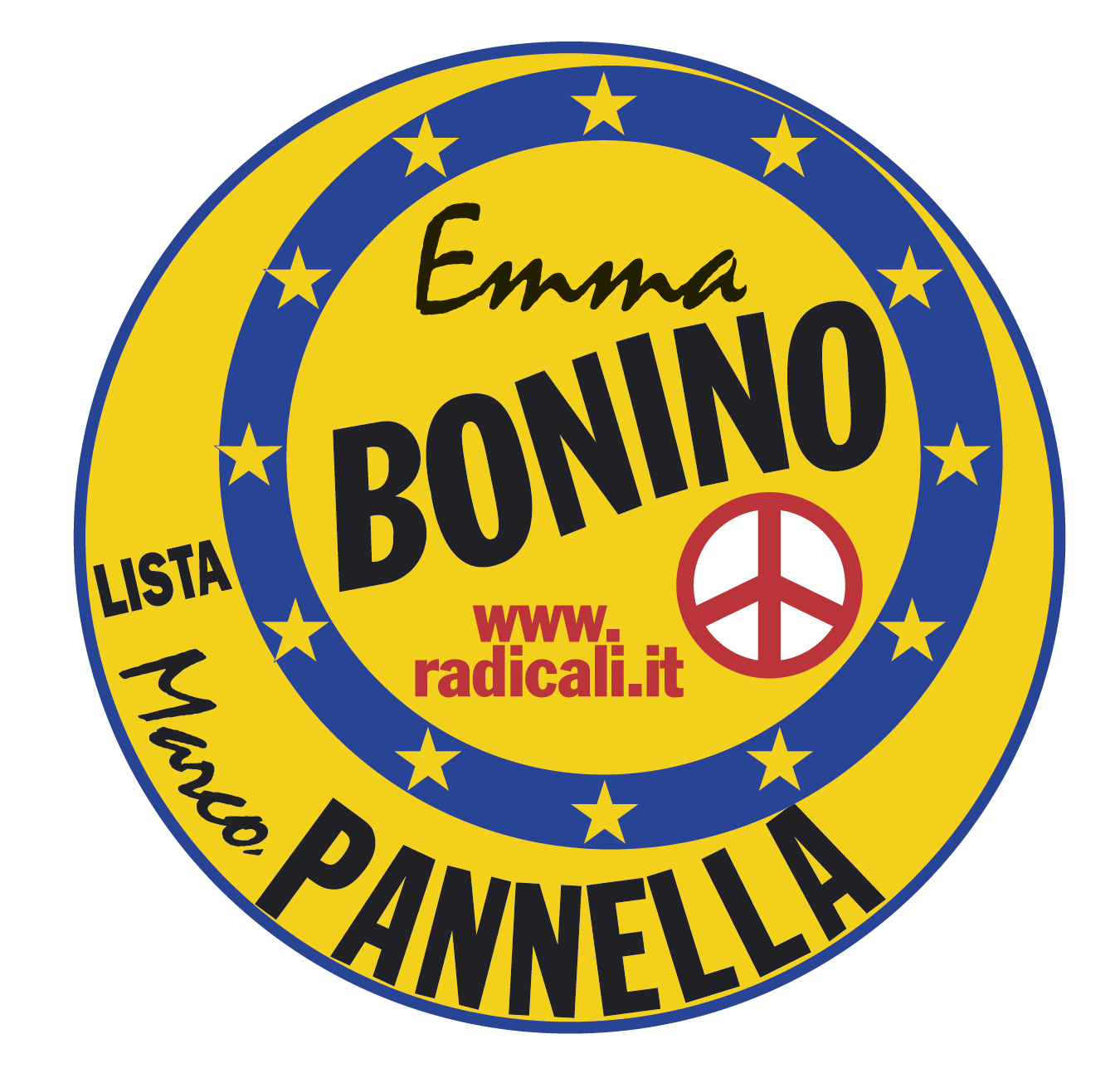
- Leader: Marco Pannella, Emma Bonino
- Founded: 2009
- Dissolved: 2012
- Preceded by: Bonino List
- Succeeded by: Amnesty Justice Freedom List
- Ideology: Liberalism; Libertarianism; Pro-Europeanism

Bonino-Pannella List (Lista Bonino-Pannella) was a liberal and libertarian electoral list formed by the Italian Radicals.

Named after Marco Pannella and Emma Bonino, the list was the continuation of Pannella List (1992–1999) and Bonino List (1999–2009) and its candidates were mainly members of the Italian Radicals. In the 2009 European Parliament election the list gained 2.4% and no seats in the election, despite being particularly strong in urban areas, such as Milan (5.5%), Bologna (5.1%), Florence (5.0%), Padua (5.0%) and Turin (4.9%).

Emma Bonino ran for president in Lazio but lost to Renata Polverini. The List gained 3.3% of the vote in Lazio and two regional councillors, while doing poorly in the other regions where the Radicals were able to deliver their lists, including in Piedmont, where they gained a mere 0.7%.

The Bonino-Pannella List was succeeded by the Amnesty Justice Freedom List in 2013.
