= Giorgio Gori =

Italian politician (born 1960)

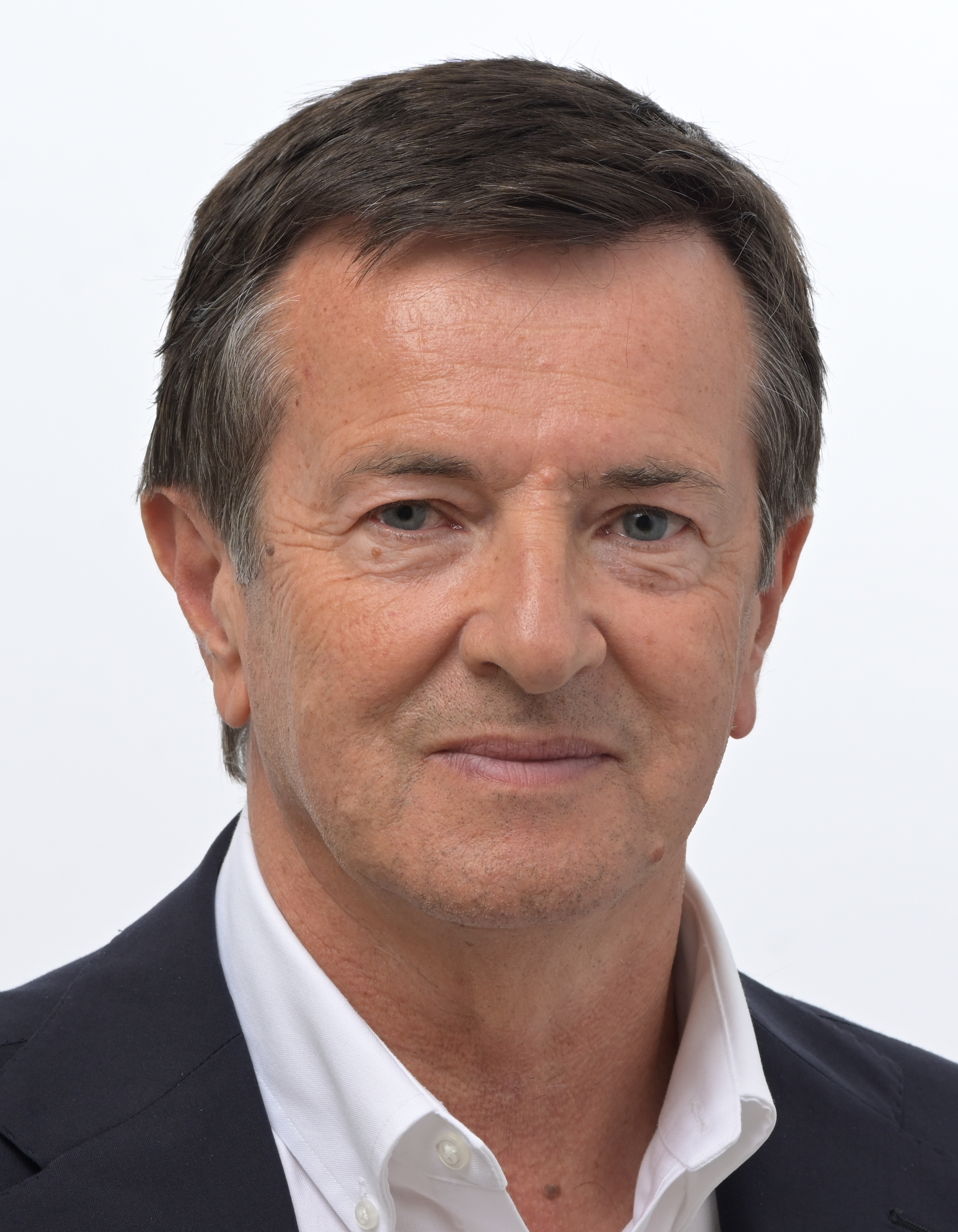

Member of the European Parliament
- Incumbent
- Assumed office 16 July 2024
- Constituency: North-West Italy

Mayor of Bergamo
- In office 10 June 2014 – 11 June 2024
- Preceded by: Franco Tentorio
- Succeeded by: Elena Carnevali

Personal details
- Born: 24 March 1960 (age 66) Bergamo, Italy
- Party: Democratic Party (PD)
- Spouse: Cristina Parodi (m. 1995)
- Children: 3, including Angelica
- Relatives: Benedetta Parodi (sister-in-law); Fabio Caressa (brother-in-law)
- Education: Polytechnic University of Milan
- Occupation: Entrepreneur; journalist; politician
- Website: giorgiogori2018.it

Giorgio Gori (born 24 March 1960) is an Italian entrepreneur, journalist, and politician. He is a member of the Democratic Party (PD) and former mayor of Bergamo.

== Early life ==
Giorgio Gori was born in Bergamo. He attended high school at Liceo Classico Paolo Sarpi in Bergamo, where he became a member of the secularist and reformism student group "Action and Freedom".

At 18 years old he started working for Radio Bergamo, a liberal station directed by Vittorio Feltri. In the following years he worked for L'Eco di Bergamo and Bergamo Oggi, two local newspapers.

== Business career ==
In 1984 Gori was hired by Rete 4, an Italian TV station owned by Silvio Berlusconi. In 1991 Gori became the director of Canale 5, the main TV channel of Berlusconi's Mediaset. In 1997 he was appointed director of Italia 1, a position he held for two years when he was re-appointed at the head of Canale 5.

In 2001 he founded Magnolia, a television production company that cooperated both with Rai and Mediaset. In September 2012 he resigned and sold all his shares to enter into politics.

== Political career ==
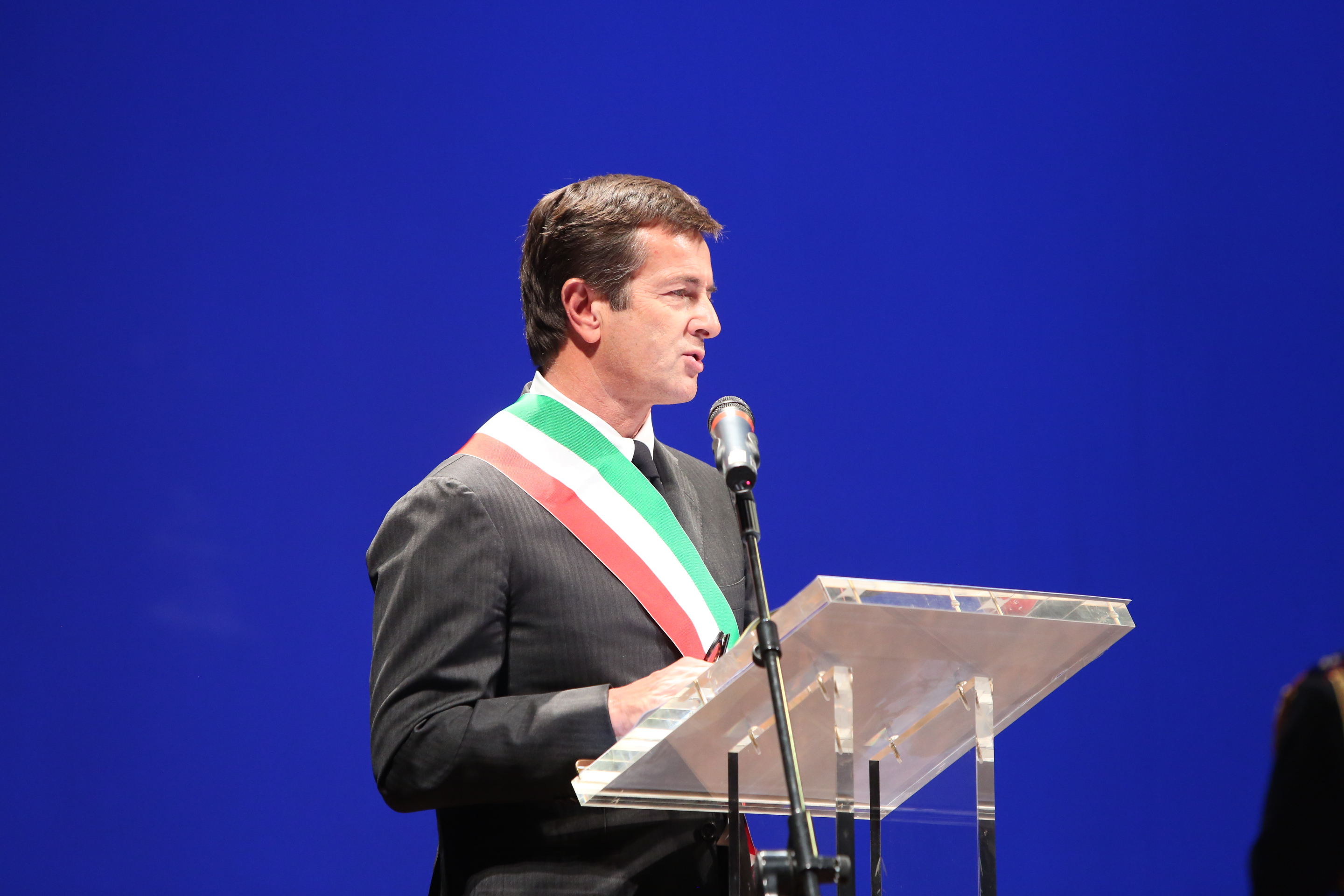
Gori in December 2016

In December 2011 Gori joined the centre-left Democratic Party. In 2012 he became a close advisor of Matteo Renzi, the Mayor of Florence who was running in the primary election to become the centre-left candidate for Prime Minister in the general election of the following year.

In 2014 Gori announced his intention to run in the Bergamo municipal election in the same year. In the centre-left primary election in February he gained 58.5% of votes beating the civic Nadia Ghisalberti and Luciano Ongaro (member of Left Ecology Freedom). In the mayoral election of June 2014, Gori gained 45.1% of votes in the first round and then he won with 53.5% against the centre-right incumbent Mayor Franco Tentorio. On 1 June 2017 Gori announced his intention to run as centre-left candidate to the Presidency of Lombardy in the Lombard regional election of 4 March 2018. Gori's principal rivals were Attilio Fontana (LN, supported by center-right coalition) and Dario Violi (M5S). On 4 March 2018 Gori lost the regional election with 29%, the worst result of a center-left candidate since the 2000 election.

As the mayor of Bergamo, Gori raised controversy on 11 February 2020 by tweeting that he dined in a Chinese restaurant in solidarity with citizens who were attacked by "alarmists", and adding that there was "really nothing to fear".

Term-limited in 2024, Gori ran for European Parliament as number two candidate on the Democratic Party list in Northwest Italy constituency. He received 211 426 preference votes and was elected. In his hometown of Bergamo, he came first with 11 610 preference votes, 8 000 more than Prime Minister Giorgia Meloni.

Political offices
Preceded by Franco Tentorio (FI)	Mayor of Bergamo; 2014–2024	Succeeded by Elena Carnevali (PD)
Party political offices
Preceded by Umberto Ambrosoli (PD); 2013	Centre-left coalition nominee for President of Lombardy; 2018	Succeeded by Pierfrancesco Majorino (PD); 2023
Party political offices
Preceded by Roberto Bruni (PD); 2004 and 2009	Centre-left coalition nominee for Mayor of Bergamo; 2014 and 2019	Succeeded by Elena Carnevali (PD); 2024
