= Dario Violi =

Italian politician

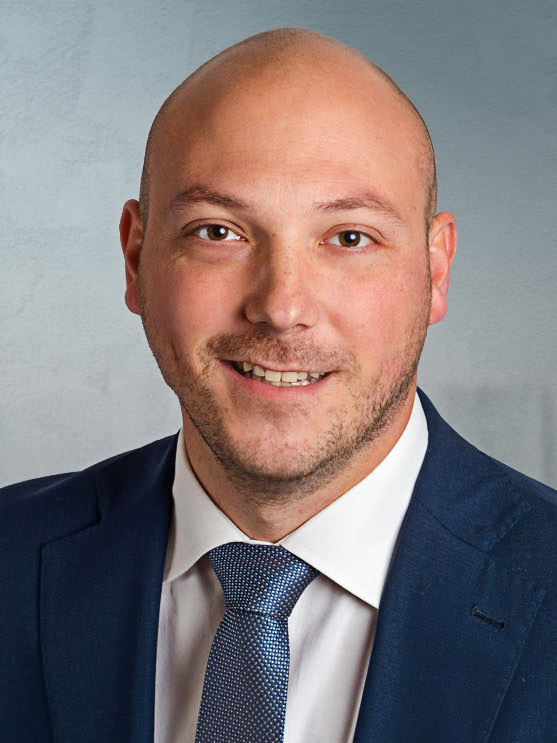
Dario Violi in 2018.

Dario Violi (Costa Volpino, 4 May 1985) is an Italian politician.

== Biography ==
He served as Lombard regional councilor from 2013 to 2018 in the 10th term of the Regional Council as a member of Five Star Movement (M5S). Violi ran for the Presidency of Lombardy in the 2018 regional election, against Attilio Fontana (LN, supported by the center-right coalition) and Giorgio Gori (PD, supported by center-left coalition). On 4 March Fontana won 50% (Gori 29%, Violi 17%) in the Regional election. Violi was compared by media with Alessandro Di Battista and called "il Dibba lombardo" (the lombard Di Battista). Viola was confirmed as Lombard regional councilor in the 11th term (2018–2023). Dario Viola is married with Laura and they have 2 children. He is graduated in political science and lives in Bergamo.

Party political offices
Preceded by Silvana Carcano; 2013	Five Star Movement nominee for President of Lombardy; 2018	Succeeded by Pierfrancesco Majorino; 2023
