= Chiamamifaro =

Italian singer-songwriter (born 2001)

- Born: Angelica Cristina Gori; 24 July 2001 (age 25); Bergamo, Lombardy, Italy
- Genres: Pop; funk; indie pop; indie rock; pop-rock; pop-punk
- Occupations: Singer; songwriter
- Instruments: Vocals; guitar
- Years active: 2020–present
- Labels: Uma Records; Nigiri; Columbia; Sony Music

Angelica Cristina Gori (born 24 July 2001), known professionally as Chiamamifaro, is an Italian singer-songwriter.

== Early life and education ==
Born and raised in Bergamo together with her sister Benedetta and her brother Alessandro, she is the third child of the television presenter Cristina Parodi and the journalist and politician (as well as mayor of Bergamo from 2014 to 2024) Giorgio Gori; her uncles are the journalist Roberto Parodi, her mother's brother, the television presenter Benedetta Parodi, her mother's sister, and the sports commentator Fabio Caressa, Benedetta's husband.

She graduated from high school in her hometown, although she also spent two years at a high school near Bristol, where she developed an interest in British indie rock. She then studied at the CPM Music Institute in Milan, where she took an academic course in pop-rock singing and graduated with a thesis entitled "Leap into the Void – Stage Fright and the Fears of Singing". She chose the pseudonym "Chiamamifaro" because she used to play guitar near a lighthouse, not far from where she spent her holidays as a teenager and considers it a safe place.

== Career ==
=== 2020–2022: Macchie e Post nostalgia ===
In 2020, he made his recording debut with the release of his first official single, "Pasta rossa", followed by the single "Domenica", co-written with Riccardo Zanotti, frontman of Pinguini Tattici Nucleari. The single "Londra" was released on 29 January 2021, followed by the single "Bistrot" on 30 April. On 11 June he released his first EP, Macchie, which includes the four previously unreleased tracks mentioned above, along with the single "Limiti", released from the album on 17 June.

On 10 December 2021, the single "Addio sul serio" was released, followed on 22 February 2022, by the single "Pioggia di CBD". On 25 March the single "Corallo" by Lortex, on which he collaborated, was made available. On June 3, together with Rovere, he released the single "Sottacqua", which preceded the release of his first studio album, Post nostalgia, containing ten tracks and released on 17 June. From 13 May to 22 October "Chiamamifaro Live 2022" took place, his first tour, with eighteen dates from Bergamo to Brescia.

=== 2023–2024: Default and Disco default ===
On April 28, 2023, the single "Ma ma ma" was released, followed on 23 June by the single "Santa subito", in collaboration with Asteria. On December 15, the single "Se parlo di te" was released, followed on 24 December by the single "La poesia". All four unreleased songs were included in the second EP Default, containing seven tracks and released on 12 January 2024.

On 19 April her second EP was reissued as a studio album titled Disco Default, adding four additional tracks, including the single "Tutti contro tutti", released on 29 March. On May 1, she performed for the first time at the Concerto del Primo Maggio, held at the Circus Maximus in Rome. From 17 July to 20 September her "Chiamamifaro – Vacanze italiane tour" took place, spanning six dates from Conscio sul Sile (TV) to Milan. "Chiamamifaro Live 2024" took place on March 13, 14, and 20, 2025, featuring three live concerts in clubs in Milan, Bologna and Rome. This was followed by the "Chiamamifaro Summer tour 2024", spanning six dates from Salzano (VE) to Sarcedo (VI).

=== 2024–present: Amici 24 and Lost & Found ===
In October 2024, after overcoming a challenge, she entered the twenty-fourth season of the Canale 5 music talent show Amici di Maria De Filippi, advancing to the initial round. In March 2025, she gained access to the evening round of the program, joining the team led by professors Alessandra Celentano and Rudy Zerbi, but was eliminated during the fourth evening episode.

During the program, he released several new songs, including "Perché?", "O.M.G." and "Leone". The single "Acqua passata" was released on 30 May 2025. All four tracks were included in his third EP, Lost & Found, which contains seven tracks and was released on 6 June. From 9 July to 7 September the first seven dates of the "Chiamami tour 2025" tour took place from Villa San Giovanni (Reggio Calabria) to Moncalieri (Turin), followed by two club dates in Rome (October 30) and Milan (November 11). On July 18, the single "L'ultima canzone", recorded with Selmi, was released. The single "Foglie" was released on 10 October as the only extract from the digital reissue of the EP Lost & Found. On 30 January 2026, the single "Me l'hai detto" tu by Occhi, on which he collaborated, was released.

== Discography ==
=== Studio albums ===
List of albums
Title	Album details
Post nostalgia	Released: 17 June 2022; Label: Columbia, Nigiri, Sony Music; Format: CD, digital download, streaming
Disco default	Released: 17 July 2024; Label: Columbia, Nigiri, Sony Music; Format: CD, digital download, streaming

=== Extended plays ===
List of EPs
Title	EP details
Macchie	Released: 11 July 2021; Label: Uma Records, Nigiri, Sony Music; Format: CD, digital download, streaming
Default	Released: 17 May 2024; Label: Columbia, Nigiri, Sony Music; Format: CD, digital download, streaming
Lost & Found	Released: 6 July 2025; Label: Columbia, Nigiri, Sony Music; Format: CD, digital download, streaming

=== Singles ===
==== As lead artist ====
List of singles and album name
Title	Year	Album or EP
"Pasta rossa"	2020	Macchie
"Domenica"	2020	Macchie
"Londra"	2021	Macchie
"Bistrot"	2021	Macchie
"Limiti"	2021	Macchie
"Addio sul serio"	2021	Post nostalgia
"Pioggia di CBD"	2022	Post nostalgia
"Sottacqua" (with Rovere)	2022	Post nostalgia
"Ma ma ma"	2023	Default
"Santa subito" (featuring Rovere)	2023	Default
"Se parlo di te"	2023	Default
"La poesia"	2023	Default
"Tutti contro tutti"	2024	Disco Default
"Perché?"	2024	Lost & Found
"O.M.G."	2025	Lost & Found
"Leone"	2025	Lost & Found
"Acqua passata"	2025	Lost & Found
"L'ultima canzone" (with Selmi)	2025	Non-album single
"Foglie"	2025	Lost & Found

==== As featured artist ====
List of singles as featured artist
Title	Year	Album or EP
"Corallo" (Lortex featuring Chiamamifaro)	2022	Chiamo
"Me l'hai detto tu" (Occhi featuring Chiamamifaro)	2026	Non-album single

== Tour ==
- 2022 – Chiamamifaro Live 2022
- 2023 – Chiamamifaro – Vacanze italiane tour
- 2024 – Chiamamifaro Live 2024
- 2024 – Chiamamifaro Summer tour 2024
- 2025 – Chiamami tour 2025

== Television programs ==
Year	Title	Network	Notes
2024–2025	Amici di Maria De Filippi	Canale 5	Contestant (season 24)
