= List of mayors of Bergamo =

Mayor of Bergamo
- Sindaco di Bergamo
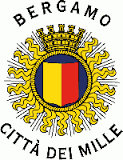

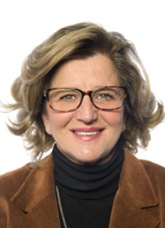
- Incumbent; Elena Carnevali (PD) since 11 June 2024
- Style: No title, courtesy or style
- Appointer: Electorate of Bergamo
- Term length: 5 years, renewable once
- Formation: 2 April 1860
- Website: Official website

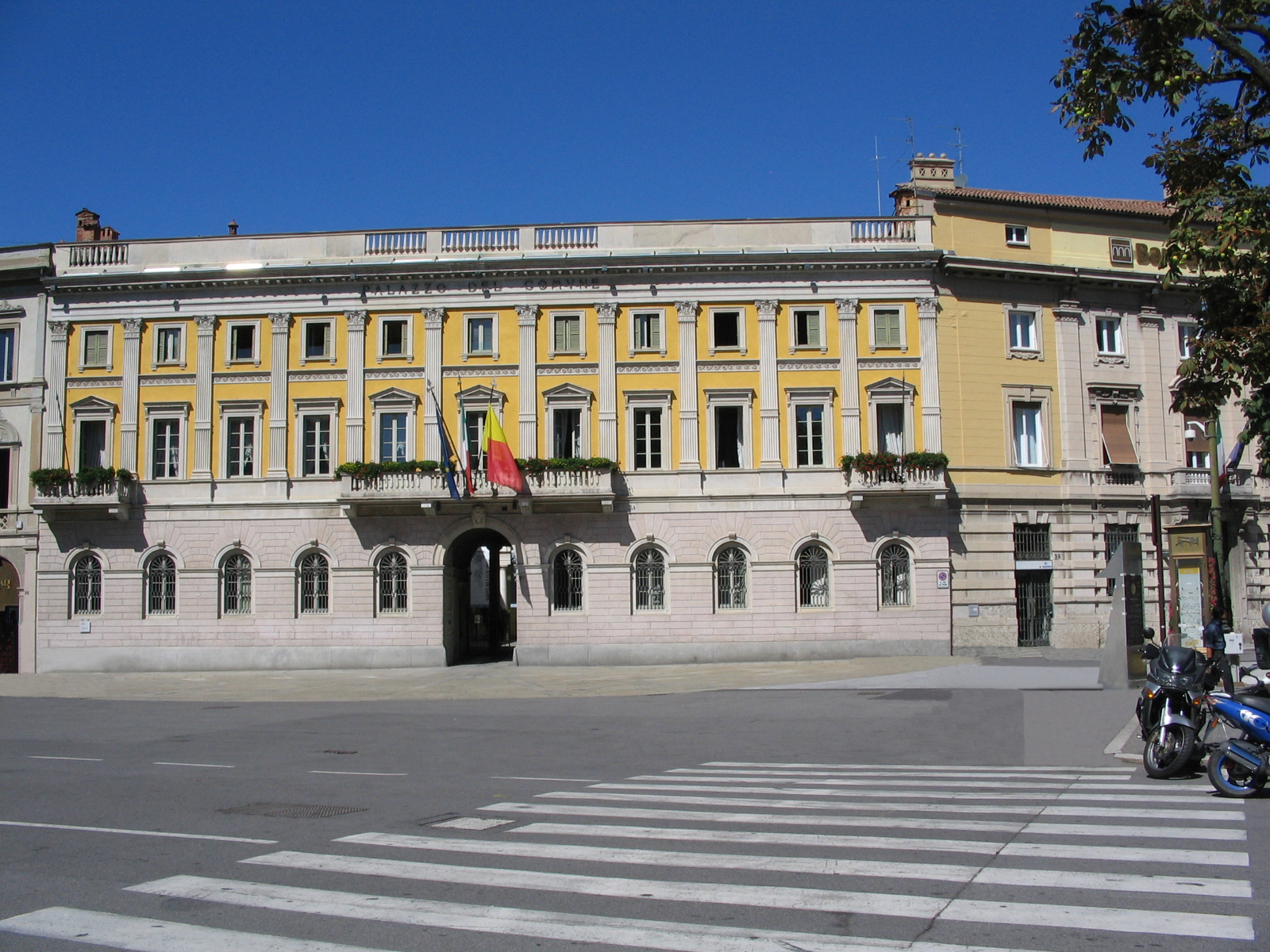
Palazzo Frizzoni is the seat of the Mayor of Bergamo.

The mayor of Bergamo is an elected politician who, along with the Bergamo's city council, is accountable for the strategic government of Bergamo in Lombardy, Italy.

The current mayor is Elena Carnevali (PD), elected on 9 June 2024.

== Overview ==
According to the Italian Constitution, the mayor of Bergamo is member of the city council.

The mayor is elected by the population of Bergamo, who also elects the members of the city council, controlling the mayor's policy guidelines and is able to enforce his resignation by a motion of no confidence. The mayor is entitled to appoint and release the members of his government.

Since 1995 the mayor is elected directly by Bergamo's electorate: in all mayoral elections in Italy in cities with a population higher than 15,000 the voters express a direct choice for the mayor or an indirect choice voting for the party of the candidate's coalition. If no candidate receives at least 50% of votes, the top two candidates go to a second round after two weeks. The election of the City Council is based on a direct choice for the candidate with a preference vote: the candidate with the majority of the preferences is elected. The number of the seats for each party is determined proportionally.

== 1860–1946 ==
- 1945–1946: Antonio Cavalli

== Republic of Italy (since 1946) ==
=== City Council election (1946–1995) ===
From 1946 to 1995, the Mayor of Bergamo was elected by the City Council.

	Mayor	Term start	Term end	Party
1	Ferruccio Galmozzi	1946	1956	DC
2	Costantino Simoncini	1956	1964	DC
3	Fiorenzo Clauser	1964	1966	DC
4	Giacomo Pezzotta	1966	1979	DC
5	Giorgio Zaccarelli	1979	1990	DC
6	Gian Pietro Galizzi	1990	1995	DC

=== Direct election (since 1995) ===
Since 1995, under provisions of new local administration law, the Mayor of Bergamo is chosen by direct election, originally every four and since 1999 every five years.

	Mayor	Term start	Term end	Party	Coalition	Election
7	Guido Vicentini (b. 1940)	9 May 1995	28 June 1999	PPI	The Olive Tree (PPI-PDS-PdD)	1995
8	Cesare Veneziani (1934–2023)	28 June 1999	28 June 2004	CCD	Pole for Freedoms (FI-AN-CCD)	1999
9	Roberto Bruni (1949–2019)	28 June 2004	8 June 2009	SDI	The Olive Tree (DS-DL-SDI-PRC)	2004
10	Franco Tentorio (1945–2026)	8 June 2009	10 June 2014	PdL	PdL • LN	2009
11	Giorgio Gori (b. 1960)	10 June 2014	28 May 2019	PD	PD • SEL and leftist lists	2014
11	Giorgio Gori (b. 1960)	28 May 2019	11 June 2024	PD	PD • IC and leftist lists	2019
12	Elena Carnevali (b. 1964)	11 June 2024	Incumbent	PD	PD • AVS and leftist lists	2024

== See also ==
- Timeline of Bergamo

== Bibliography ==
- "Palafrizzoni intitola 4 sale ad ex sindaci". Eco di Bergamo. 3 June 2009.
- Bortolo Belotti (1989). Storia di Bergamo e dei bergamaschi. Bergamo: Edizioni Bolis.
- Pilade Frattini; Renato Ravanelli (2014). Il Novecento a Bergamo. Cronache di un secolo. UTET.
