= 2018 Lombard regional election =

← 2013	4 March 2018	2023 →

All 80 seats to the Regional Council of Lombardy
- Turnout: 73.10% (▼3.64%)
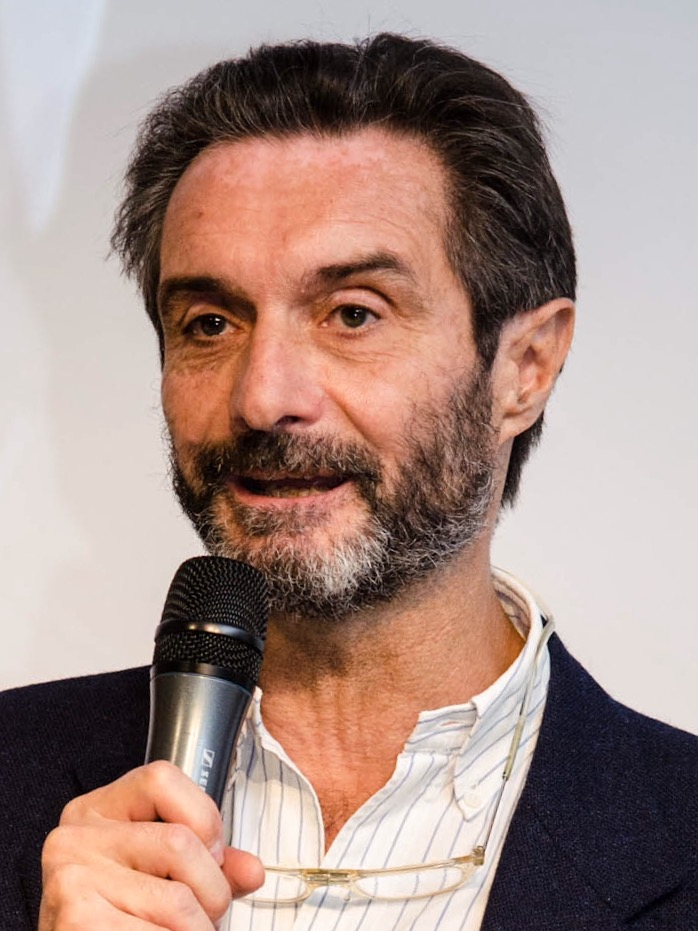

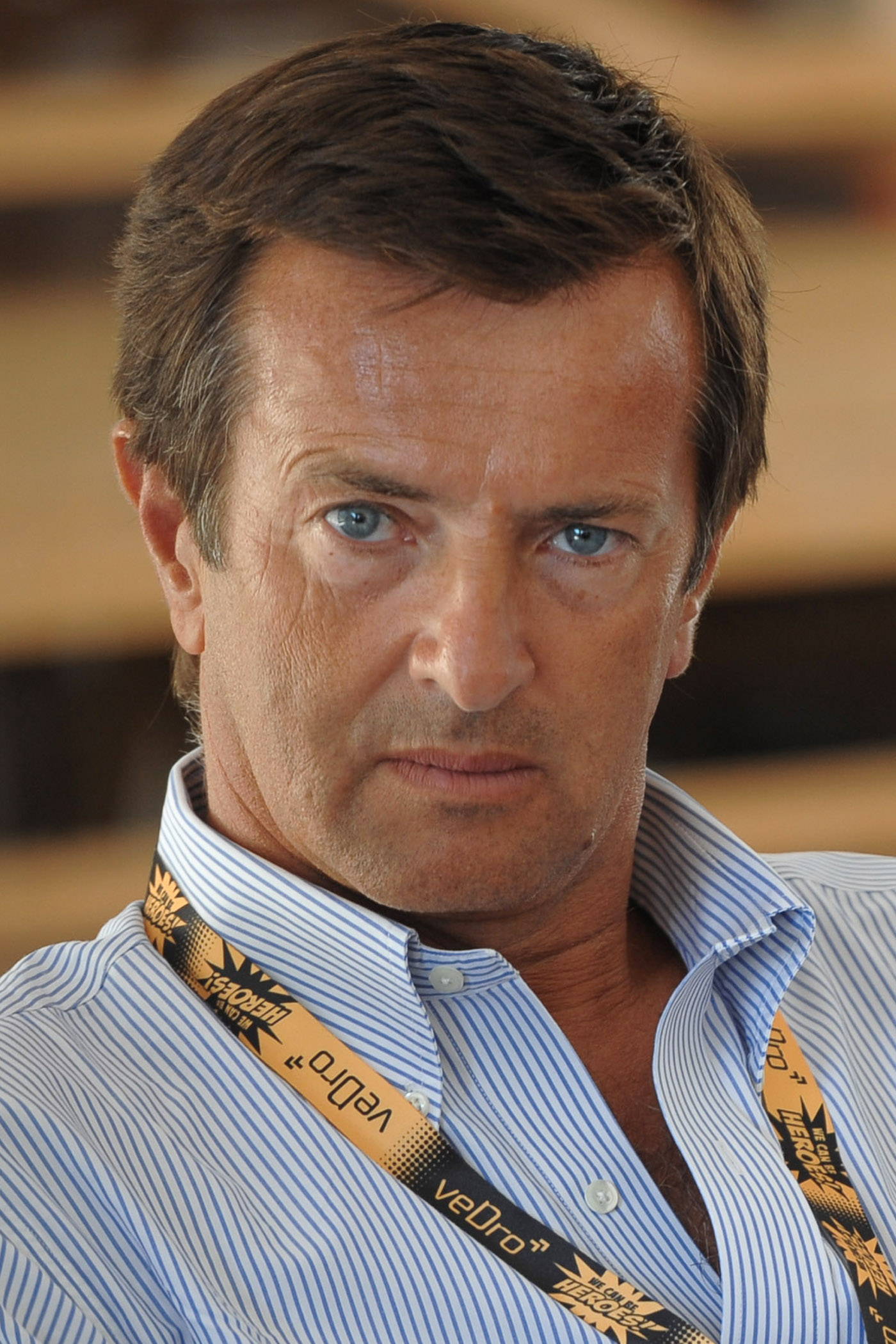

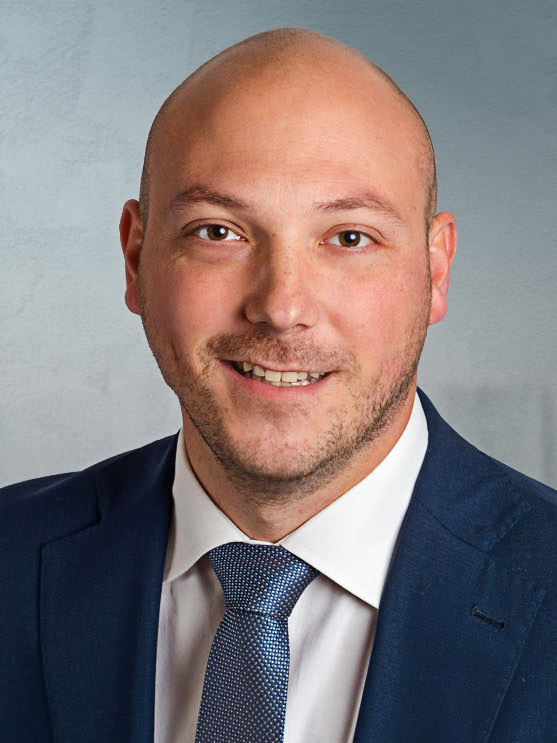
	Majority party	Minority party	Third party
Leader	Attilio Fontana	Giorgio Gori	Dario Violi
Party	Lega	Democratic Party	Five Star Movement
Alliance	Centre-right	Centre-left
Last election	49 seats, 42.8%	22 seats, 38.2%	9 seats, 13.6%
Seats won	49	18	13
Seat change	Steady	▼4	▲4
Popular vote	2,793,370	1,633,367	974,984
Percentage	49.8%	29.1%	17.4%
Swing	▲7.5%	▼9.1%	▲3.8%
- Map of results for the presidential and legislative election .
President before election
Roberto Maroni
LN
President-elect
Attilio Fontana
Lega

The 2018 Lombard regional election took place on 4 March 2018.

The election took place concurrently with the Italian general election and the Lazio regional election.

== Electoral system ==
Since 2012, Lombardy has adopted its legislation to elect its Council, very similar to the national Tatarella Law of 1995.

While the President of Lombardy and the leader of the opposition are still elected at-large, 78 councilors are elected by party lists under a form of semi-proportional representation. The winning coalition receives a jackpot of at least 45 seats, which are divided between all majority parties using the D'Hondt method, as it happens between the losing lists. Each party then distributes its seats to its provincial lists, where candidates are openly selected.

According to the Law 17 February 1968, no. 108, the Regional Council is elected every five years. The election can take place on the fourth Sunday before the completion of five years period.

== Campaign ==
On 1 March 2016, President Maroni announced his intention to run for re-election as president. Nonetheless, on 8 January 2018 he announced he'd not seek a re-election as president, citing personal reasons and launching former mayor of Varese Attilio Fontana as a candidate of the center-right coalition.

On 1 June 2017 Giorgio Gori, the incumbent mayor of Bergamo, announced his decision to run for the presidency for the center-left coalition.

On 15 January 2018, Fontana stated that the white race and the Western culture were in danger due to the migration flows from Africa. This created lot of protests and criticisms from the centre-left Democratic Party and also the anti-establishment Five Star Movement.

== Parties and candidates ==
Political party or alliance	Constituent lists	Previous result		Candidate
Political party or alliance	Constituent lists	Votes (%)	Seats	Candidate
Centre-right coalition	Forza Italia (FI)	16.7	19	Attilio Fontana
Centre-right coalition	League (Lega)	13.0	15	Attilio Fontana
Centre-right coalition	Brothers of Italy (FdI)	1.6	2	Attilio Fontana
Centre-right coalition	Us with Italy–UDC (NcI–UDC)	1.6	–	Attilio Fontana
Centre-right coalition	Pensioners' Party (PP)	0.9	1	Attilio Fontana
Centre-right coalition	Energies for Lombardy (EpL)	—	—	Attilio Fontana
Centre-right coalition	Fontana for President (FP)	—	—	Attilio Fontana
Centre-left coalition	Democratic Party (PD)	25.3	17	Giorgio Gori
Centre-left coalition	Together (PSI – Greens – AC)	—	—	Giorgio Gori
Centre-left coalition	More Europe (+E)	—	—	Giorgio Gori
Centre-left coalition	Popular Civic List (CP)	—	—	Giorgio Gori
Centre-left coalition	Progressive Lombardy (LP)	—	—	Giorgio Gori
Centre-left coalition	Gori for President (GP)	—	—	Giorgio Gori
Centre-left coalition	Lombardy for Autonomies Target (OLA)	—	—	Giorgio Gori
Five Star Movement (M5S)		14.3	9	Dario Violi
Free and Equal (LeU)		—	—	Onorio Rosati
Great North (GN)		—	—	Giulio Arrighini
CasaPound (CPI)		—	—	Angela De Rosa

== Results ==
Seats in the Regional Council by coalition: Centre-right (49) Centre-left (18) M5S (13)

According to the final results, Attilio Fontana was the new President of Lombardy with more than 49% of the votes, obtaining the greater bonus given by the electoral law.

4 March 2018 Lombard regional election results
Candidates	Votes	%	Seats	Parties	Votes	%	Seats
Attilio Fontana	2,793,370	49.75	1				
Attilio Fontana	2,793,370	49.75	1	League – Lombard League	1,553,514	29.64	28
Attilio Fontana	2,793,370	49.75	1	Forza Italia	750,628	14.32	14
Attilio Fontana	2,793,370	49.75	1	Brothers of Italy	190,804	3.64	3
Attilio Fontana	2,793,370	49.75	1	Fontana for President	76,637	1.46	1
Attilio Fontana	2,793,370	49.75	1	Us with Italy – UDC	66,355	1.26	1
Attilio Fontana	2,793,370	49.75	1	Energies for Lombardy	27,967	0.53	1
Attilio Fontana	2,793,370	49.75	1	Pensioners' Party	20,259	0.38	–
Attilio Fontana	2,793,370	49.75	1	Total	2,686,610	51.29	48
Giorgio Gori	1,633,367	29.09	1				
Giorgio Gori	1,633,367	29.09	1	Democratic Party	1,008,496	19.24	15
Giorgio Gori	1,633,367	29.09	1	Gori for President	158,671	3.02	2
Giorgio Gori	1,633,367	29.09	1	More Europe	108,743	2.07	–
Giorgio Gori	1,633,367	29.09	1	Lombardy for the Autonomies Target	62,840	1.19	–
Giorgio Gori	1,633,367	29.09	1	Together	35,071	0.66	–
Giorgio Gori	1,633,367	29.09	1	Popular Civic List	20,668	0.39	–
Giorgio Gori	1,633,367	29.09	1	Progressive Lombardy	20,036	0.38	–
Giorgio Gori	1,633,367	29.09	1	Total	1,414,674	26.99	17
Dario Violi	974,984	17.36	–	Five Star Movement	933,243	17.80	13
Onorio Rosati	108,407	1.93	–	Free and Equal	111,296	2.12	–
Angela De Rosa	50,368	0.89	–	CasaPound	45,416	0.86	–
Massimo Gatti	38,194	0.68	–	Left for Lombardy	35,713	0.68	–
Giulio Arrighini	15,791	0.28	–	Great North	13,769	0.26	–
Total candidates	5,614,481	100.00	2	Total parties	5,240,126	100.00	78
Source: Ministry of the Interior – Historical Archive of Elections

Popular vote (party)
Lega	29.64%
PD	19.24%
M5S	17.80%
FI	14.32%
FdI	3.64%
GP	3.02%
LeU	2.12%
+E	2.07%
FP	1.46%
NcI–UDC	1.26%
Others	5.43%

Popular vote (coalition)
CDX	51.33%
CSX	27.02%
M5S	17.80%
LeU	2.12%
Others	1.77%

President
Fontana	49.75%
Gori	29.09%
Violi	17.36%
Rosati	1.93%
De Rosa	0.89%
Gatti	0.68%
Arrighini	0.26%

=== Results by province ===
Election results map. Orange denotes municipalities and provinces won by Gori and Blue denotes those won by Fontana.

Province	Attilio Fontana	Giorgio Gori	Dario Violi	Onorio Rosati	Others	Turnout
Milan	742,685 42.83%	589,969 34.02%	326,040 18.80%	42,123 2.42%	33,169 1.90%	72.03%
Brescia	391,419 54.59%	189,426 26.42%	106,845 14.90%	12,498 1.74%	16,786 2.33%	76.55%
Bergamo	352,462 54.98%	185,003 28.86%	83,409 13.01%	8,254 1.28%	11,889 1.84%	75.87%
Varese	271,614 53.59%	123,917 24.45%	93,234 18.39%	7,985 1.57%	10,064 1.98%	71.06%
Monza and Brianza	245,806 48.39%	145,635 28.67%	98,717 19.43%	9,639 1.89%	8,144 1.58%	75.82%
Como	194,665 56.23%	85,538 24.70%	56,613 16.35%	5,266 1.52%	4,107 1.17%	70.59%
Pavia	153,811 51.42%	76,416 25.55%	56,535 18.90%	5,941 1.98%	6,375 2.12%	69.76%
Mantua	99,923 44.53%	64,569 28.77%	49,990 22.27%	4,981 2.21%	4,927 2.19%	70.36%
Cremona	105,759 51.67%	55,815 27.26%	34,676 16.94%	3,683 1.79%	4,744 2.31%	73.94%
Lecco	103,875 51.85%	60,269 30.08%	30,643 15.29%	3,705 1.84%	1,821 0.89%	75.66%
Lodi	66,061 51.86%	32,115 25.21%	25,151 19.74%	2,547 1.99%	1,493 1.15%	75.12%
Sondrio	65,290 61.74%	24,695 23.35%	13,131 12.41%	1,785 1.68%	834 0.77%	66.26%

=== Results by capital city ===
City	Attilio Fontana	Giorgio Gori	Dario Violi	Onorio Rosati	Others	Turnout
Milan	273,261 40.16%	279,821 41.12%	96,639 14.20%	18,712 2.75%	11,986 1.75%	68.39%
Brescia	45,453 43.38%	38,680 36.92%	15,405 14.70%	2,984 2.84%	2,244 2.13%	74.37%
Monza	30,841 44.93%	24,285 35.38%	10,892 15.87%	1,553 2.26%	1,060 1.52%	73.07%
Bergamo	27,463 41.51%	28,652 43.30%	7,518 11.36%	1,364 2.06%	1,159 1.74%	73.09%
Como	20,958 46.77%	15,501 34.59%	6,902 15.40%	933 2.08%	510 1.12%	64.47%
Varese	23,348 53.13%	13,228 30.10%	5,927 13.48%	744 1.69%	693 1.56%	68.72%
Pavia	17,035 43.22%	14,863 37.66%	5,530 14.03%	1,194 3.02%	811 2.05%	68.02%
Cremona	17,579 44.92%	12,710 32.48%	6,575 16.80%	1,166 2.97%	1,099 2.97%	72.13%
Mantua	9,262 35.70%	10,126 39.03%	4,986 19.22%	866 3.33%	698 2.68%	68.46%
Lecco	12,857 46.55%	9,915 35.90%	3,955 14.32%	665 2.40%	225 0.80%	73.83%
Lodi	11,593 47.35%	8,040 32.84%	3,932 16.06%	607 2.47%	307 1.24%	72.86%
Sondrio	6,038 50.47%	3,998 33.42%	1,514 12.65%	313 2.61%	99 0.81%	66.93%

=== Seats by province ===
Province	Lega	PD	FI	M5S	FdI	Others	Total
Milan	6	5	4	5	1	3	24
Brescia	4	1	3	1	1	-	10
Bergamo	4	1	1	1	1	1	9
Varese	3	1	1	1	-	1	7
Monza and Brianza	3	1	2	1	-	-	7
Como	2	1	1	1	-	-	5
Pavia	1	1	1	1	-	-	4
Cremona	1	1	-	1	-	-	3
Lecco	1	1	1	-	-	-	3
Mantua	1	1	-	1	-	-	3
Lodi	1	1	-	-	-	-	2
Sondrio	1	-	-	-	-	-	1
Total	28	15	14	13	3	5	78
