= Elena Carnevali =

Italian politician (born 1964)

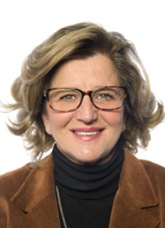
- Carnevali in 2018

Mayor of Bergamo
- Incumbent
- Assumed office 11 June 2024
- Preceded by: Giorgio Gori

Member of the Chamber of Deputies
- In office 15 March 2013 – 12 October 2022
- Constituency: Lombardy

Personal details
- Born: 30 August 1964 (age 61) Bergamo, Italy
- Party: Democratic Party
- Profession: Physiotherapist

Elena Carnevali (born 30 August 1964) is an Italian politician of the Democratic Party who has served as mayor of Bergamo since June 2024. She previously served as a member of the Chamber of Deputies from 2013 to 2022.
