= Cristina Parodi =

Italian journalist and television host

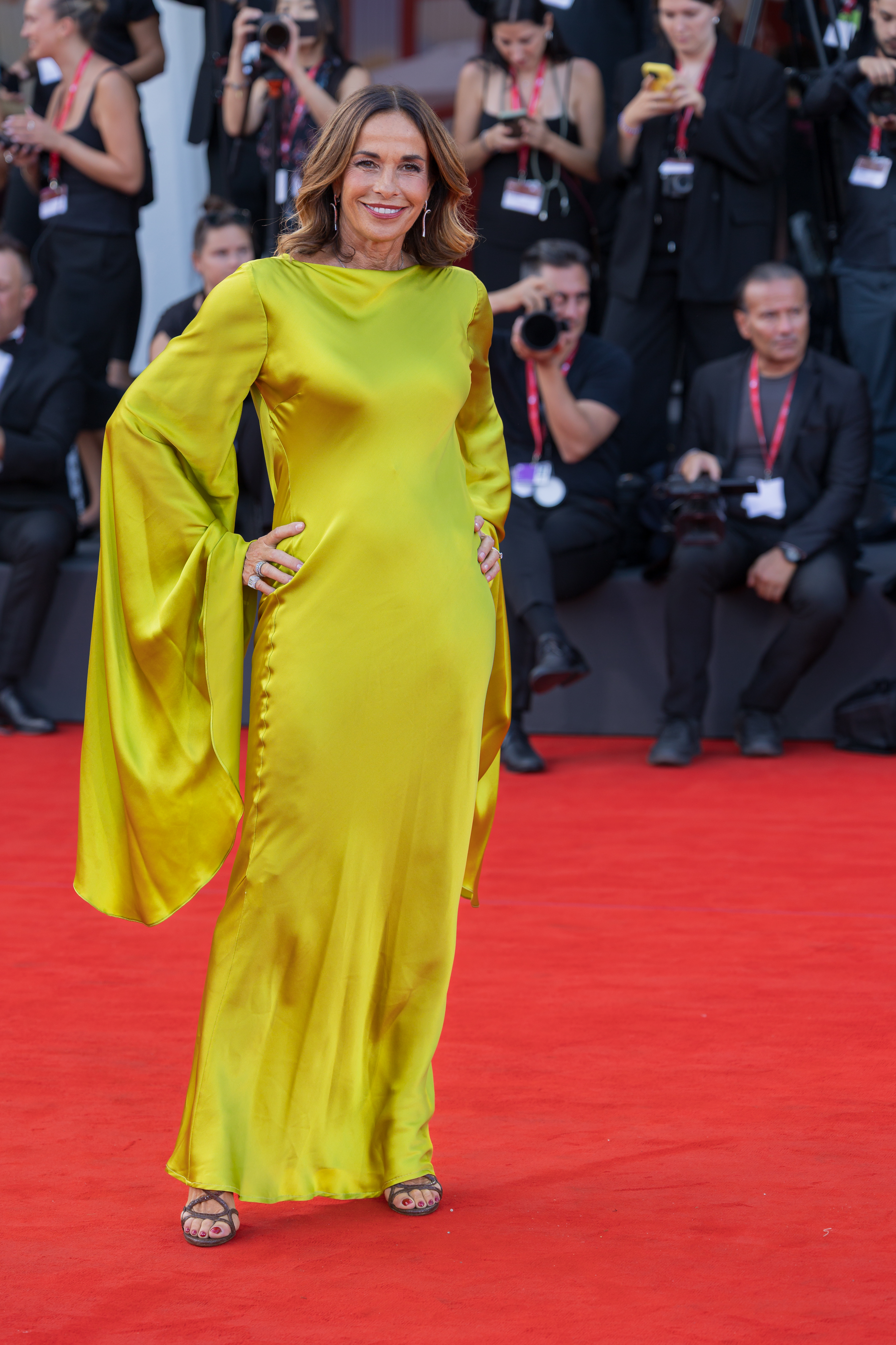
- Born: Cristina Parodi; 3 November 1964 (age 61); Alessandria, Italy
- Occupations: Journalist; television host
- Years active: 1988–present
- Spouse: Giorgio Gori (m. 1995)
- Children: 3, including Angelica Gori
- Relatives: Benedetta Parodi (younger sister); Fabio Caressa (brother-in-law)

Cristina Parodi (born 3 November 1964) is an Italian journalist and television host.

== Biography ==
She debuted in the 1980s on the small TV channels TelePiccolo and Telereporter and after in Odeon TV, hosting some sports shows like Caccia al 13 and Forza Italia.

In 1990, she moved to Fininvest, joining the sports news editor, presenting Calciomania with Maurizio Mosca, and working as a correspondent in Pressing. From 1991, when the Gulf War started, she switched to the news entourage, and from autumn 1991 started presenting Canale 5 News, the first Canale 5's news programme. From January 1992, she became, with the director Enrico Mentana, Lamberto Sposini and Cesara Buonamici, one of the most important TG5's anchorwomen.

In September 1996, left TG5 and started presenting Verissimo, a daily afternoon show aired by Canale 5, which talked about gossip and cases of crime. In these years, the programme had also been promoted in primetime with a course titled Le storie di Verissimo. She presented this programme, having a grateful success, until June 2005; in 2000, she hosted the entertainment primetime show Strano ma vero, with Gene Gnocchi, and in the summer of 2003, presented the reality show The Bachelor - L'uomo dei sogni. She has also presented some TV events and various editions of Natale in Vaticano.

From September 2005, she came back presenting the main edition of TG5, on air at 8 p.m., and left hosting Verissimo.

She is the sister of another Italian journalist, Benedetta Parodi and a distant cousin of the Italian actress and television presenter Alba Parietti.
