= Fabio Caressa =

Italian journalist and football commentator

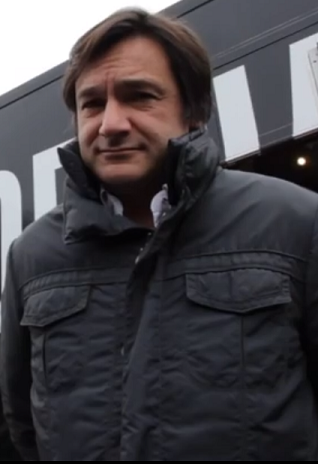
- Caressa in 2015
- Born: 18 April 1967 (age 59); Rome, Italy
- Education: Luiss; UCLA; University of Salamanca
- Occupations: Journalist; football commentator
- Years active: 1986–present
- Spouse: Benedetta Parodi (m. 1999)
- Children: 3
- Relatives: Cristina Parodi (sister-in-law); Giorgio Gori (brother-in-law); Angelica Gori (niece)

Fabio Caressa (born 18 April 1967) is an Italian journalist and football commentator, broadcasting for Sky Italia.

== Career ==
Caressa began his career in 1986 for Canale 66, a local Roman broadcaster linked to TeleRoma56. The first match for which he provided radio commentary was Cesena–Lazio in Serie B during the 1986–87 season. He later obtained a degree in political science from the LUISS, with an experimental thesis on CNN, a diploma in Public Speaking from UCLA in 1988, and a Spanish language diploma from the University of Salamanca in 1990.

In 1991 Caressa was chosen to take part in the commentators team for the newly founded Italian pay tv TELE+, founded by Groupe Canal+; the first televised match for which he provided commentary was a 1991 Premier League match between Tottenham and Leeds United. In 1998, he started commenting on Sunday evening Serie A matches, taking turns with Massimo Marianella. In 2003, Caressa became the main voice of Sky Sport and, together with former Inter Milan and Italy defender Giuseppe Bergomi, he became one of the most celebrated sporting commentators in Italy.

After the 2006 FIFA World Cup, which Italy won, defeating France 5–3 on penalties in the final, after a 1–1 draw, Caressa wrote a book about his experiences during his career and the World Cup, called Andiamo a Berlino ("We're going to Berlin"), a reference to Caressa's exclamation at the end of Italy's World Cup semi-final victory against hosts Germany, which ended in a 2–0 victory after extra time; just a few seconds after Italy's second goal, scored by Alessandro Del Piero, Caressa shouted the phrase, expressing his joy for Italy's qualification for the final that would be played in Berlin.

Caressa commentated all swimming events in Sky Sport's coverage of the 2012 Summer Olympics for the first time in his career, along with former swimmers Massimiliano Rosolino and Cristina Chiuso.

From 1 July 2013 to 10 March 2016, Caressa was Sky Sport's ad interim co-director, with delegation to Sky Sport 24, then becoming Sky Sport director. In December 2016, he was appointed Sky Sport co-director with delegation to the program Sky Calcio Club.

== Personal life ==
Caressa is married to Italian TV-news journalist Benedetta Parodi. Together, they have two daughters and one son: Matilde (born 28 September 2002), Eleonora (born 20 October 2004) and Diego (born 28 October 2009).

== Bibliography ==
- Andiamo a Berlino, Baldini Castoldi Dalai Editore, 2006. ISBN 9788860730442.
