= Franco Tentorio =

Italian politician (1945–2026)

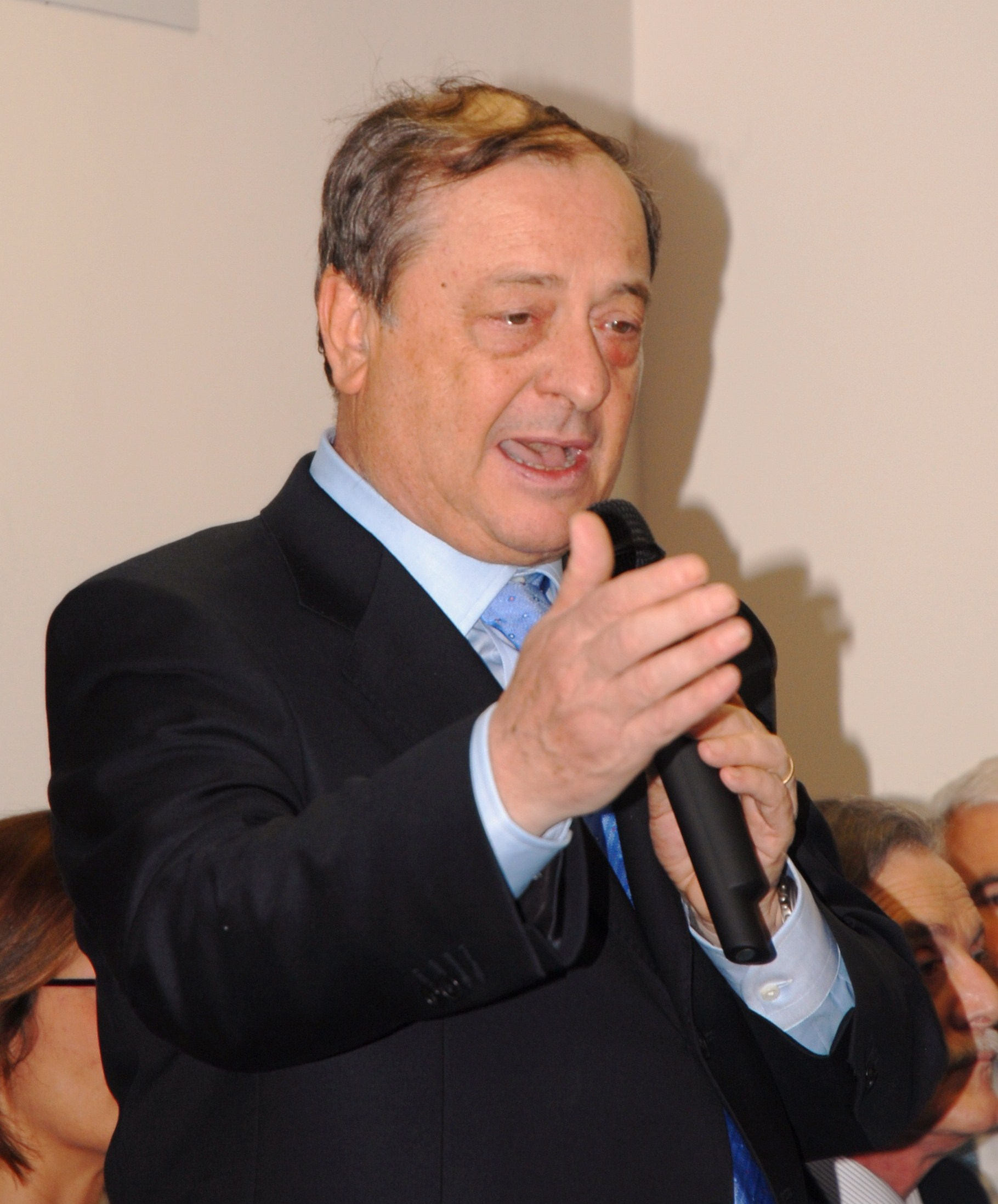
- Tentorio in 2009

Mayor of Bergamo
- In office 8 June 2009 – 10 June 2014
- Preceded by: Roberto Bruni
- Succeeded by: Giorgio Gori

Personal details
- Born: 5 January 1945 Bergamo, Kingdom of Italy
- Died: 27 March 2026 (aged 81) Bergamo, Lombardy, Italy
- Party: Italian Social Movement (1970–1995); National Alliance (1995–2009); The People of Freedom (2009–2013); Forza Italia (2013–2026)
- Profession: Tax advisor

Franco Tentorio (5 January 1945 – 27 March 2026) was an Italian politician.

== Life and career ==
Franco Tentorio was born in Bergamo, Lombardy, Italy on 5 January 1945. He served as Mayor of Bergamo from June 2009 to June 2014. Tentorio died on 27 March 2026, at the age of 81.

== See also ==
- List of mayors of Bergamo

Political offices
Preceded by Roberto Bruni	Mayor of Bergamo; 2009–2014	Succeeded by Giorgio Gori
