= Antonio Cavalli =

Italian politician (1889–1965)

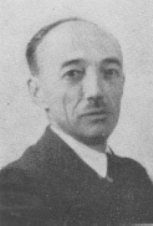
Antonio Cavalli

Antonio Cavalli (12 September 1889 – 20 December 1965) was an Italian politician who served as Mayor of Bergamo (1945–1946), member of the Constituent Assembly (1946–1948) and Deputy for two legislatures (1948–1958).
