= Umberto Ambrosoli =

Italian politician

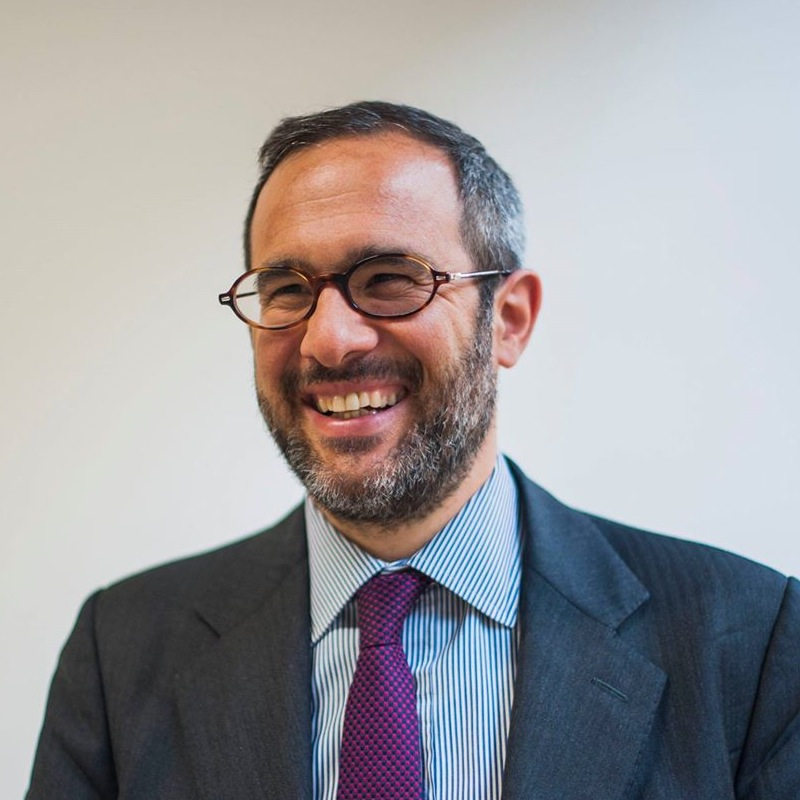
Umberto Ambrosoli

Umberto Ambrosoli (born 10 September 1971 in Milan) is an Italian politician.

He was the candidate for the centre-left coalition at the regional election in Lombardy (24–25 February 2013).

In 2009 he published the book Qualunque cosa succeda (Whatever happens) about his father, the lawyer Giorgio Ambrosoli, murdered 11 July 1979 by William Joseph Aricò, an assassin hired by the banker Michele Sindona. The book was winner of the Tiziano Terzani and Capalbio prizes.

In November 2009 he also received an award of merit from Algiusmi, the association of law graduates of the University of Milan.

== Works ==
- Giorgio Ambrosoli: servire lo Stato per scelta di libertà, Ravenna, Girasole, 2005. ISBN 88-7567-459-0.
- Ambrosoli, Umberto (2009). Qualunque cosa succeda. Indicativo presente (1 ed.). Milano (Italy): Sironi. ISBN 978-88-518-0120-5.
- Liberi e senza paura. Cronaca di una candidatura in Lombardia, Milano, Sironi, 2013. ISBN 978-88-518-0225-7.
- Coraggio, Bologna, il Mulino, 2015. ISBN 978-88-152-5795-6.
- Diritto all’oblio, dovere della memoria, Milano, Bompiani, 2017. ISBN 978-88-587-7630-8
