= 2013 Lombard regional election =

Italian regional election

← 2010	24–25 February 2013	2018 →

All 80 seats to the Regional Council of Lombardy
- Turnout: 76.74% (▲12.10%)
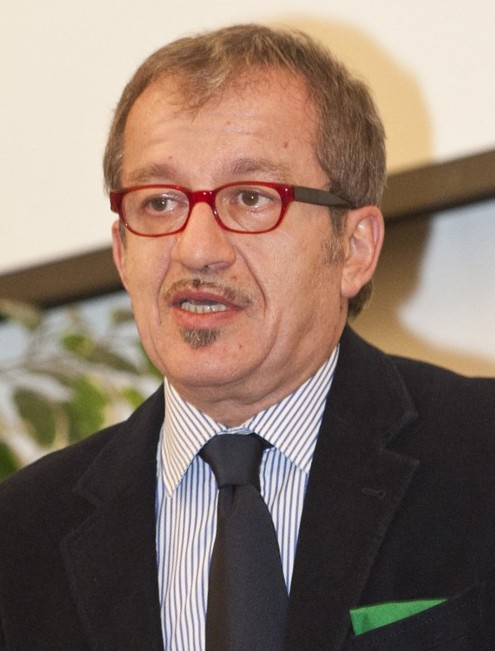

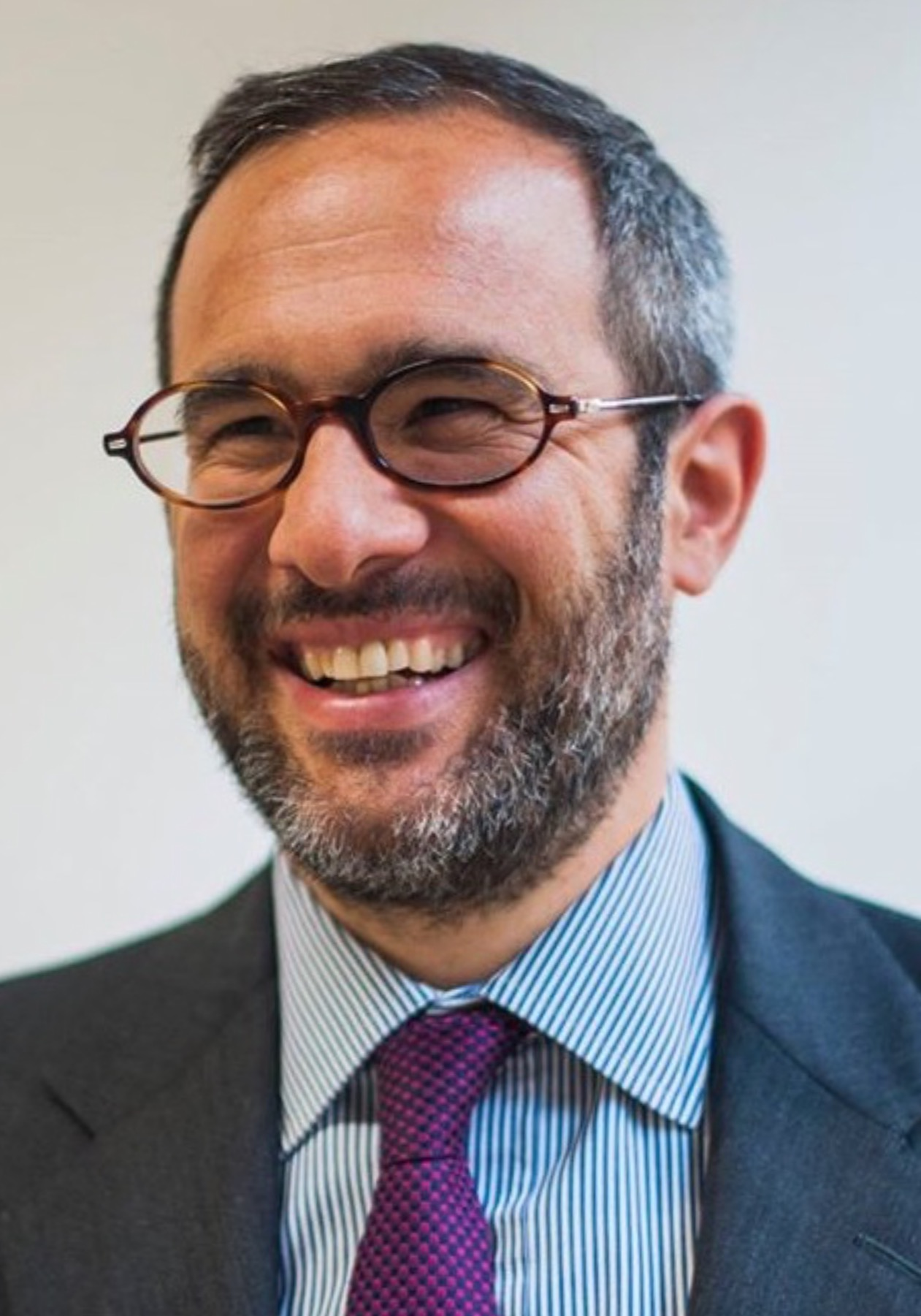
	Majority party	Minority party
Leader	Roberto Maroni	Umberto Ambrosoli
Party	Northern League	Independent
Alliance	Centre-right	Centre-left
Last election	49 seats, 56.1%	28 seats, 33.3%
Seats won	49	22
Seat change	Steady	▼6
Popular vote	2,456,921	2,194,169
Percentage	42.8%	38.2%
Swing	▼13.3%	▲4.9%
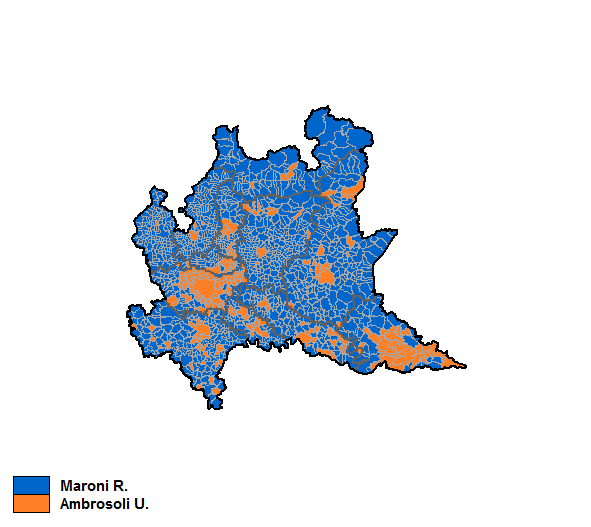
President before election
Roberto Formigoni
PdL
President-elect
Roberto Maroni
LN

The 2013 Lombard regional election took place on 24 and 25 February 2013 and was the first snap election in Lombard political history, and the first one paired with a general election. The 10th term of the Regional Council was chosen.

== Electoral system ==
Lombardy used for the first time its own legislation to elect its Council, very similar to national Tatarella Law of 1995. The new electoral law was adopted before the resignation of 74 members of the Council on October 26, 2012. While the President of Lombardy and the leader of the opposition are still elected at-large, 78 councillors, instead of 64 as it was before, are elected by party lists under a form of semi-proportional representation. The winning coalition receives a jackpot of at least 45 seats, which are divided between all majority parties using the D'Hondt method, as it happens between the losing lists. Each party then distributes its seats to its provincial lists, where candidates are openly selected.

== Campaign ==
On 16 October 2012, Formigoni announced the dissolution of the regional legislature after one of his commissioners, Domenico Zambetti of the PdL was arrested on accusations he bought votes from the 'Ndrangheta in 2010 and extorted favours and public building contracts, including construction tenders for the World Expo 2015 in Milan.

=== Center-left primary election, 2012 ===
On 15 December 2012 the center-left primary election took place to decide the official candidate of the coalition in the election. There were three candidates: Umberto Ambrosoli, son of Giorgio killed in 1979, Alessandra Kustermann and Andrea Di Stefano. Umberto Ambrosoli received the 57% of the votes and became the center-left official candidate for the regional election.

Candidate	Votes	%
Umberto Ambrosoli	86,732	57.66
Andrea Di Stefano	34,946	23.23
Alessandra Kustermann	28,744	19.11
Total	150,604	100.00

== Parties and candidates ==
Political party or alliance	Constituent lists	Previous result		Candidate
Political party or alliance	Constituent lists	Votes (%)	Seats	Candidate
Centre-right coalition	The People of Freedom	31.8	23	Roberto Maroni
Centre-right coalition	Northern League	26.2	18	Roberto Maroni
Centre-right coalition	Pensioners' Party	2.6	1	Roberto Maroni
Centre-right coalition	Brothers of Italy	—	—	Roberto Maroni
Centre-right coalition	Others	—	—	Roberto Maroni
Centre-left coalition	Democratic Party	22.9	21	Umberto Ambrosoli
Centre-left coalition	Italy of Values	6.3	4	Umberto Ambrosoli
Centre-left coalition	Left Ecology Freedom	1.4	1	Umberto Ambrosoli
Centre-left coalition	Italian Socialist Party	0.3	–	Umberto Ambrosoli
Centre-left coalition	Others	—	—	Umberto Ambrosoli
Centrist coalition	Union of the Centre	3.8	3	Gabriele Albertini
Centrist coalition	Civic Lombardy	—	—	Gabriele Albertini
Five Star Movement		2.3	–	Silvana Carcano
Act to Stop the Decline		—	—	Carlo Pinardi

== Results ==
According to the final results, Roberto Maroni was the new President of Lombardy with more than 40% of the votes, obtaining the greater bonus given by the electoral law.

24–25 February 2013 Lombard regional election results
Candidates	Votes	%	Seats	Parties	Votes	%	Seat
Roberto Maroni	2,456,921	42.82	1				
Roberto Maroni	2,456,921	42.82	1	The People of Freedom	904,742	16.73	19
Roberto Maroni	2,456,921	42.82	1	Northern League – Lombard League	700,907	12.96	15
Roberto Maroni	2,456,921	42.82	1	Maroni for President	552,863	10.23	11
Roberto Maroni	2,456,921	42.82	1	Brothers of Italy	83,810	1.55	2
Roberto Maroni	2,456,921	42.82	1	Pensioners' Party	50,843	0.94	1
Roberto Maroni	2,456,921	42.82	1	Labour and Freedom List	27,374	0.51	–
Roberto Maroni	2,456,921	42.82	1	Ecological Alliance	8,270	0.15	–
Roberto Maroni	2,456,921	42.82	1	Total	2,328,809	43.07	48
Umberto Ambrosoli	2,194,169	38.24	1				
Umberto Ambrosoli	2,194,169	38.24	1	Democratic Party	1,369,440	25.33	17
Umberto Ambrosoli	2,194,169	38.24	1	Ambrosoli for President – Civic Pact	380,241	7.03	4
Umberto Ambrosoli	2,194,169	38.24	1	Left Ecology Freedom	97,627	1.81	–
Umberto Ambrosoli	2,194,169	38.24	1	Lombard Popular Centre	63,885	1.18	–
Umberto Ambrosoli	2,194,169	38.24	1	Ethical to the Left	52,152	0.96	–
Umberto Ambrosoli	2,194,169	38.24	1	Italy of Values	35,141	0.65	–
Umberto Ambrosoli	2,194,169	38.24	1	Italian Socialist Party	16,624	0.31	–
Umberto Ambrosoli	2,194,169	38.24	1	Total	2,015,110	37.27	21
Silvana Carcano	782,007	13.63	–	Five Star Movement	775,211	14.34	9
Gabriele Albertini	236,597	4.12	–				
Gabriele Albertini	236,597	4.12	–	Civic Lombardy	133,435	2.47	–
Gabriele Albertini	236,597	4.12	–	Union of the Centre	85,721	1.59	–
Gabriele Albertini	236,597	4.12	–	Total	219,156	4.05	–
Carlo Pinardi	68,133	1.19	–	Act to Stop the Decline	68,469	1.27	–
Total candidates	5,737,827	100.00	2	Total parties	5,406,755	100.00	78
Source: Ministry of the Interior – Historical Archive of Elections

Popular vote (party)
PD	25.33%
PdL	16.73%
M5S	14.34%
LN	12.96%
Maroni List	10.23%
Ambrosoli List	7.03%
SC	2.47%
SEL	1.81%
UdC	1.59%
FdI	1.55%
FFD	1.27%
CPL	1.18%
Others	1.96%

President
Maroni	42.82%
Ambrosoli	38.24%
Carcano	13.63%
Albertini	4.12%
Pinardi	1.27%

=== Results by province ===
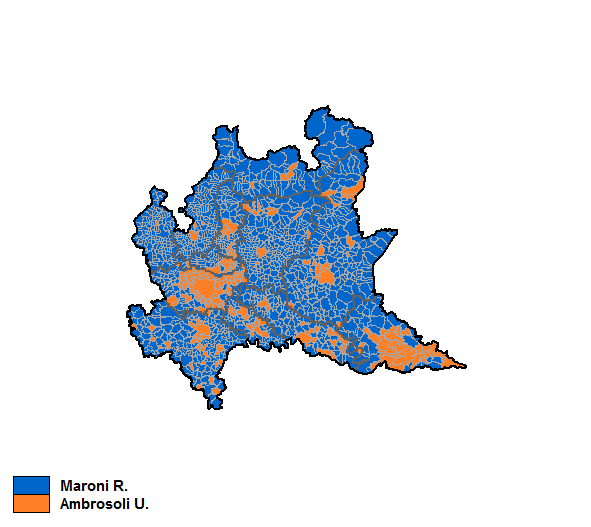
Election results map. Orange denotes municipalities won by Ambosoli and Blue denotes those won by Maroni.

Province	Roberto Maroni	Umberto Ambrosoli	Silvana Carcano	Gabriele Albertini	Carlo Pinardi	Turnout
Milan	654,388 (36.25%)	795,290 (44.18%)	245,753 (13.65%)	84,136 (4.67%)	20,456 (1.14%)	76.48%
Brescia	346,234 (47.52%)	250,248 (34.25%)	93,315 (12.81%)	29,215 (4.01%)	9,608 (1.32%)	80.58%
Bergamo	315,372 (49.16%)	221,301 (34.50%)	72,608 (11.32%)	22,861 (3.56%)	9,330 (1.45%)	78.59%
Varese	241,138 (47.49%)	169,966 (33.47%)	70,661 (13.92%)	21,024 (4.14%)	5,010 (0.99%)	73.11%
Monza and Brianza	216,112 (42.14%)	193,041 (37.64%)	76,307 (14.88%)	20,856 (4.07%)	6,559 (1.28%)	78.95%
Como	166,302 (48.70%)	114,630 (33.57%)	43,532 (12.75%)	13,230 (3.87%)	3,762 (1.10%)	72.20%
Pavia	138,333 (43.78%)	114,386 (36.20%)	49,300 (15.60%)	10,646 (3.37%)	3,308 (1.05%)	74.59%
Mantua	89,032 (37.38%)	95,268 (40.00%)	42,975 (18.04%)	8,170 (3.43%)	2,738 (1.15%)	76.84%
Cremona	92,458 (43.30%)	79,934 (37.43%)	30,769 (14.41%)	8,081 (3.78%)	2,305 (1.08%)	78.27%
Lecco	86,685 (43.24%)	77,326 (38.58%)	25,217 (12.58%)	8,497 (4.24%)	2,726 (1.36%)	77.41%
Lodi	56,278 (42.91%)	48,750 (37.17%)	19,994 (15.24%)	4,888 (3.73%)	1,255 (0.96%)	79.19%
Sondrio	54,589 (51.37%)	34,026 (32.02%)	11,576 (10.89%)	4,993 (4.70%)	1,076 (1.01%)	68.54%

=== Results by capital city ===
City	Roberto Maroni	Umberto Ambrosoli	Silvana Carcano	Gabriele Albertini	Carlo Pinardi	Turnout
Milan	246,918 (34.45%)	346,495 (48.35%)	71,430 (9.97%)	41,890 (5.85%)	9,910 (1.38%)	73.63%
Brescia	42,623 (38.71%)	49,453 (44.91%)	11,993 (10.89%)	4,391 (3.99%)	1,659 (1.51%)	79.76%
Monza	27,150 (38.09%)	30,696 (43.07%)	9,037 (12.68%)	3,237 (4.54%)	1,154 (1.62%)	77.59%
Bergamo	25,709 (37.55%)	32,108 (46.90%)	6,184 (9.03%)	3,007 (4.39%)	1,449 (2.12%)	77.06%
Como	18,567 (40.68%)	19,168 (42.00%)	5,115 (11.21%)	2,203 (4.83%)	590 (1.29%)	67.47%
Varese	20,853 (46.84%)	16,774 (37.68%)	4,227 (9.61%)	2,084 (4.68%)	530 (1.19%)	70.02%
Pavia	16,704 (38.72%)	19,111 (44.30%)	4,993 (11.57%)	1,675 (3.88%)	658 (1.53%)	76.60%
Cremona	15,258 (36.18%)	18,583 (44.06%)	6,281 (14.89%)	1,585 (3.76%)	467 (1.11%)	78.16%
Mantua	8,326 (29.65%)	14,063 (50.08%)	4,235 (15.08%)	994 (3.54%)	462 (1.65%)	75.49%
Lecco	10,829 (38.50%)	12,470 (44.34%)	3,101 (11.03%)	1,335 (4.75%)	390 (1.39%)	76.33%
Lodi	10,208 (39.53%)	11,358 (43.99%)	2,800 (10.84%)	1,130 (4.38%)	325 (1.26%)	78.78%
Sondrio	4,749 (37.30%)	5,369 (42.17%)	1,672 (13.13%)	700 (5.50%)	242 (1.90%)	71.29%

=== Seats by province ===
Province	PD	LN/Maroni List	PdL	M5S	Ambrosoli List	FdI	Others	Total
Milan	5	7	5	3	2	1	1	24
Brescia	2	4	2	1	1	-	-	10
Bergamo	2	3	2	1	1	-	-	9
Varese	1	3	2	1	-	-	-	7
Monza and Brianza	2	2	2	1	-	-	-	7
Como	1	2	1	-	-	1	-	5
Pavia	1	1	1	1	-	-	-	4
Cremona	1	1	1	-	-	-	-	3
Lecco	1	1	1	-	-	-	-	3
Mantua	1	-	1	1	-	-	-	3
Lodi	-	1	1	-	-	-	-	2
Sondrio	-	1	-	-	-	-	-	1
Total	17	26	19	9	4	2	1	78
