= Emilio Del Bono =

Italian politician (born 1965)

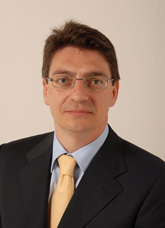

Mayor of Brescia
- In office 12 June 2013 – 31 March 2023
- Preceded by: Adriano Paroli
- Succeeded by: Laura Castelletti

Member of the Chamber of Deputies
- In office 9 May 1996 – 28 April 2008
- Constituency: Brescia–Roncadelle (1996–2001); Lombardy (2001–2008)

Personal details
- Born: 26 November 1965 (age 60) Brescia, Italy
- Party: DC (till 1994); PPI (1994–2002); DL (2002–2007); PD (since 2007)
- Children: 1
- Education: University of Milan
- Occupation: Lawyer

Emilio Del Bono (born 26 November 1965) is an Italian politician from the Democratic Party and former mayor of Brescia.

== Biography ==
After graduating in Law at the University of Milan, in 1991 Del Bono entered into politics being elected city councillor of Brescia, being very close to former minister and then Mayor Mino Martinazzoli. From 1993 to 1994, Del Bono was the provincial secretary of the Christian Democracy in the province of Brescia, and then he was appointed provincial secretary of the Italian People's Party.

In the 1996 general election, Del Bono was elected to the Chamber of Deputies with the Olive Tree, being later re-elected in the 2001 and the 2006 election.

In 2008, Del Bono decided not to run in the 2008 general election since he became the Democratic Party candidate for the office of Mayor of Brescia but was defeated by the People of Freedom candidate Adriano Paroli.

In 2013 Del Bono once again challenged Paroli for the office of Mayor of Brescia and managed to win on the runoff. He was re-elected Mayor on the first round in the 2018 local elections.

Just a few months before the expiration of his second term as mayor, Del Bono was elected member of the Regional Council of Lombardy with more than 35,000 preferences, being also the most voted candidate of any party in the election. On 15 March 2023 he was elected vice president of the regional council. On 31 March he ceased to be mayor due to incompatibility with his new role as regional councillor.

== Electoral history ==
Election	House	Constituency	Party	Votes	Result
1996	Chamber of Deputies	Brescia–Roncadelle	Ulivo	33,854	Elected
2001	Chamber of Deputies	Brescia–Roncadelle	Ulivo	33,688	Not Elected
2001	Chamber of Deputies	Lombardy 2	Ulivo	– (Note: Elected in a closed list proportional representation system.)	Elected
2006	Chamber of Deputies	Lombardy 2	Ulivo	–	Elected
2023	Regional Council of Lombardy	Brescia	PD	35,761	Elected

=== First-past-the-post elections ===
1996 general election (C): Brescia-Roncadelle
Candidate	Coalition	Votes	%
Emilio Del Bono	The Olive Tree (PPI)	33,854	40.0
Alessandro Altobelli	Pole for Freedoms (FI)	29,471	34.8
Flavio Bonafini	Lega Nord	21,317	25.2
Total		84,642	100.0

2001 general election (C): Brescia-Roncadelle
Candidate	Coalition	Votes	%
Giuseppe Romele	House of Freedoms (FI)	38,002	48.6
Emilio Del Bono	The Olive Tree (PPI)	33,688	43.1
Piergiorgio Gazich	Italy of Values	3,711	4.7
Veronica Pede	Bonino List	2,801	3.6
Total		78,202	100.0

Political offices
Preceded by Adriano Paroli	Mayor of Brescia; 2013–2023	Succeeded by Laura Castelletti
