= Pier Luigi Mottinelli =

Italian politician (born 1964)

President of the Province of Brescia
- In office 13 October 2014 – 2 November 2018
- Preceded by: Daniele Molgora
- Succeeded by: Samuele Alghisi

Mayor of Cedegolo
- In office 14 June 1999 – 8 June 2009
- Preceded by: Gianpietro Guizzetti
- Succeeded by: Andrea Bortolo Pedrali

Personal details
- Born: 12 January 1964 (age 62) Cedegolo, Province of Brescia, Italy
- Party: The Daisy; Democratic Party
- Occupation: Sales representative

Pier Luigi Mottinelli (born 12 January 1964) is an Italian politician who served as president of the Province of Brescia from 2014 to 2018.

A member of the Daisy, he served as mayor of Cedegolo from 1999 to 2009. In 2009, he was elected to the Provincial Council of Brescia in 2009 as a candidate of the Democratic Party. In October 2014, he was elected president of the Province of Brescia in the first provincial election held under the Delrio Law, supported by a broad coalition which included the Democratic Party, Forza Italia, New Centre-Right and Union of the Centre. In 2016, he was elected president of UPI Lombardy.

In 2023, Mottinelli publicly supported Stefano Bonaccini in the Democratic Party leadership election, endorsing his candidacy for party secretary and arguing for a renewal of the party's political direction.
