= List of presidents of the Province of Brescia =

President of the Province of Brescia
- Presidente della Provincia di Brescia
- Incumbent; Emanuele Moraschini since 30 January 2023
- Term length: 4 years
- Inaugural holder: Diogene Valotti
- Formation: 1889

The president of the Province of Brescia is the head of the provincial government in Brescia, Lombardy, Italy. The president oversees the administration of the province, coordinates the activities of the municipalities, and represents the province in regional and national matters.

Since January 2023, the office has been held by Emanuele Moraschini, a centre-right independent.

== List ==
=== Presidents of the Provincial Deputation (1889–1924) ===
No.	Portrait	Name	Term		Party
No.	Portrait	Name	Start	End	Party
1		Diogene Valotti	2 December 1889	18 September 1891	Historical Right
2		Angelo Manzini	18 September 1891	14 August 1893	Historical Left
3		Giovanni Quistini	14 August 1893	12 August 1895	Historical Left
4		Pietro Frugoni	12 August 1895	10 August 1903	Historical Right
5		Bortolo Benedini	10 August 1903	22 February 1904	Historical Right
6		Giuliano Corniani	22 February 1904	21 November 1908	Historical Right
7		Donato Fossati	21 November 1908	13 January 1924	Historical Right

=== Presidents of the Royal Commission (1924–1929) ===
No.	Portrait	Name	Term		Party
No.	Portrait	Name	Start	End	Party
1		Giovanni Tafuri	13 January 1924	May 1925	National Fascist Party
2		Giacomo Salvetti	May 1925	March 1926	National Fascist Party
3		Giorgio Porro Savoldi	March 1926	28 April 1929	National Fascist Party

=== Presidents of the Provincial Rectorate (1929–1945) ===
No.	Portrait	Name	Term		Party
No.	Portrait	Name	Start	End	Party
1		Giorgio Porro Savoldi	28 April 1929	14 March 1934	National Fascist Party
–		Umberto Petragnani	15 March 1934	21 May 1934	Prefectural commissioner
2		Oreste Buffoli	21 May 1934	3 August 1934	Prefectural commissioner
2		Oreste Buffoli	3 August 1934	February 1943	National Fascist Party
3		Pietro Bersi	February 1943	1 September 1943	National Fascist Party
–		Defendente Meda	1 September 1943	1 October 1943	Prefectural commissioner
–		Francesco Diana	2 October 1943	17 January 1944	Prefectural commissioner
–		Guido Bellometti	17 January 1944	April 1945	Prefectural commissioner

=== Presidents of the Provincial Deputation (1945–1951) ===
No.	Portrait	Name	Term		Party
No.	Portrait	Name	Start	End	Party
1		Arturo Reggio	19 May 1945	27 May 1951	Italian Liberal Party

=== Presidents of the Province (1951–present) ===
No.	Portrait	Name	Term		Party
No.	Portrait	Name	Start	End	Party
1		Ercoliano Bazoli	27 May 1951	7 June 1970	Christian Democracy
2		Mino Martinazzoli	7 June 1970	17 April 1972	Christian Democracy
3		Tarcisio Gitti	17 April 1972	15 June 1975	Christian Democracy
4		Bruno Boni	15 June 1975	12 May 1985	Christian Democracy
5		Vittorio Marniga	12 May 1985	30 November 1987	Italian Socialist Party
6		Costanzo Valli	30 November 1987	7 May 1995	Italian Socialist Party
7		Andrea Lepidi	7 May 1995	27 June 1999	Italian People's Party
8		Alberto Cavalli	27 June 1999	28 June 2004	Forza Italia
8		Alberto Cavalli	28 June 2004	7 June 2009	Forza Italia
9		Daniele Molgora	7 June 2009	13 October 2014	Lega Nord
10		Pier Luigi Mottinelli	13 October 2014	2 November 2018	Democratic Party
11		Samuele Alghisi	2 November 2018	30 January 2023	Democratic Party
12		Emanuele Moraschini	30 January 2023	Incumbent	Independent (centre-right)

== Sources ==
- "Storia amministrativa dell'ente". Ministero dell'Interno.
- Amighetti, Damiana; Jannacci, Filippo, eds. (2005). Atti del Consiglio Provinciale di Brescia. La storia della Provincia di Brescia attraverso gli Atti del Consiglio Provinciale dal 1860 al 1960. Brescia: Provincia di Brescia.
- Menichini, Piera (2005). "I presidenti delle Province dall'Unità alla Grande guerra: repertorio analitico". Storia Amministrazione Costituzione (13): 234–235.
