= Paolo Corsini =

Italian politician and university professor, former Mayor of Brescia

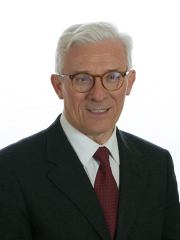

Mayor of Brescia
- In office 14 December 1998 – 8 March 2008
- Preceded by: Mino Martinazzoli
- Succeeded by: Adriano Paroli
- In office 27 September 1992 – 13 June 1994
- Preceded by: Gianni Panella
- Succeeded by: Mino Martinazzoli

Member of the Senate
- In office 15 March 2013 – 22 March 2018
- Constituency: Lombardy

Member of the Chamber of Deputies
- In office 29 April 2008 – 15 March 2013
- Constituency: Lazio
- In office 9 May 1996 – 14 April 1999
- Constituency: Brescia-Flero

Personal details
- Born: 9 December 1947 (age 78) Adro, Italy
- Party: PDS (1991-1998); DS (1998-2007); PD (2007-2017); MDP (2017-2019)
- Education: Università Cattolica del Sacro Cuore
- Occupation: Historian

Paolo Corsini (born 9 December 1947) is an Italian politician and university professor, former mayor of Brescia from 1992 to 1994 and from 1998 to 2008.

== Biography ==
After graduating in Classic Letters, Corsini taught Modern History at the University of Parma.

Corsini joined the Democratic Party of the Left in 1991 and the following year he was elected Mayor of Brescia, holding the office until 1994. From 1994 to 1996, Corsini was Deputy Mayor of Brescia under the guidance of Mino Martinazzoli.

At the 1996 general election, Corsini was elected in the Chamber of Deputies. He leaves the office in 1999 after having been elected again Mayor of Brescia the previous year, being re-elected in 2003. He held his mayoral seat until 2008 when he was re-elected with the Democratic Party in the Chamber of Deputies, after the 2008 election.

At the 2013 election, Corsini was elected in the Senate, holding the seat till the end of the legislature in 2018, after he decided not to run again for a seat in Parliament.

In 2017, Corsini left the Democratic Party and joined the Democratic and Progressive Movement. He retired from active politics in 2019.

== Electoral history ==
| Election | House | Constituency | Party | Votes | Result |
|---|---|---|---|---|---|
| 1987 | Chamber of Deputies | Brescia–Bergamo | PCI | 9,014 | Not Elected |
| 1996 | Chamber of Deputies | Brescia-Flero | PDS | 33,000 | Elected |
| 2008 | Chamber of Deputies | Lazio 2 | PD | – (Note: Elected in a closed list proportional representation system.) | Elected |
| 2013 | Senate of the Republic | Lombardy 2 | PD | – | Elected |

=== First-past-the-post elections ===
1996 general election (C): Brescia-Flero
| Candidate | Coalition | Votes | % |
|---|---|---|---|
| Paolo Corsini | The Olive Tree (PDS) | 33,000 | 39.6 |
| Gianpaolo Fasoli | Pole for Freedoms (FI) | 26,891 | 32.3 |
| Giulio Arrighini | Lega Nord | 23,386 | 28.1 |
| Total | | 83,277 | 100.0 |

Political offices
| Preceded by Gianni Panella | Mayor of Brescia; 1992–1994 | Succeeded by Mino Martinazzoli |
| Preceded by Mino Martinazzoli | Mayor of Brescia; 1998–2008 | Succeeded by Adriano Paroli |
