= Giovanni Quistini =

Italian lawyer and politician (1841–1913)

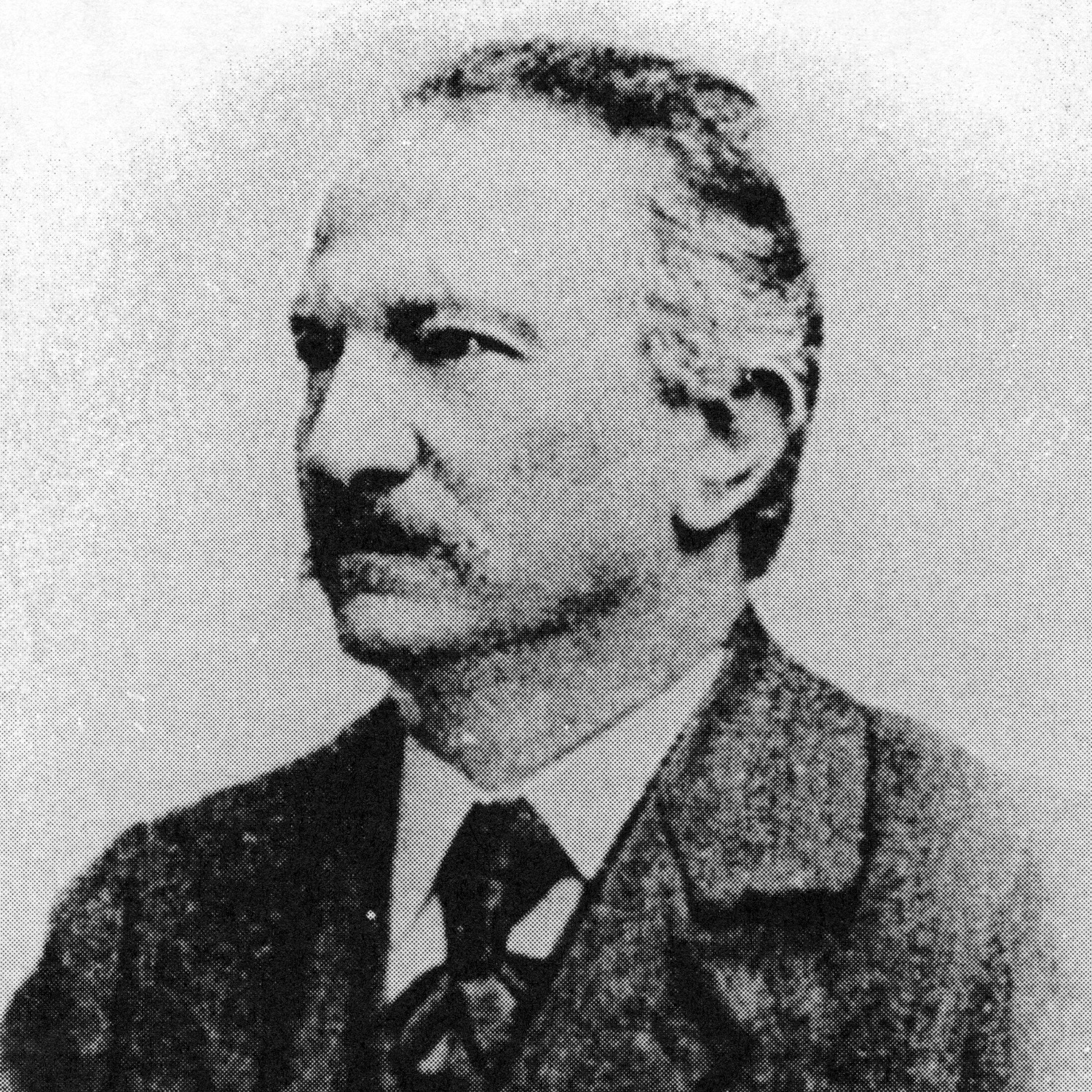

Member of the Chamber of Deputies
- In office 1 February 1904 – 8 February 1909
- Constituency: Iseo

President of the Province of Brescia
- In office 14 August 1893 – 12 August 1895
- Preceded by: Angelo Manzini
- Succeeded by: Pietro Frugoni

Personal details
- Born: 28 October 1841 Villa Cogozzo, Villa Carcina, Kingdom of Lombardy–Venetia
- Died: 7 May 1913 (aged 71) Gardone Val Trompia, Province of Brescia, Kingdom of Italy
- Party: Historical Left
- Profession: Lawyer

Giovanni Quistini (28 October 1841 – 7 May 1913) was an Italian lawyer and politician. A member of the Historical Left, he served as president of the Province of Brescia from 1893 to 1895 and as a member of the Chamber of Deputies from 1904 to 1909.
