= Samuele Alghisi =

Italian politician (born 1971)

President of the Province of Brescia
- In office 2 November 2018 – 30 January 2023
- Preceded by: Pier Luigi Mottinelli
- Succeeded by: Emanuele Moraschini

Mayor of Manerbio
- In office 27 May 2013 – 15 May 2023
- Preceded by: Cesare Giovanni Meletti
- Succeeded by: Paolo Vittorielli

Personal details
- Born: 11 March 1971 (age 55) Brescia, Lombardy, Italy
- Party: Democratic Party
- Occupation: Social scientist

Samuele Alghisi (born 11 March 1971) is an Italian politician who served as president of the Province of Brescia from 2018 to 2023. He also served as mayor of Manerbio from 2013 to 2023.

In October 2018, Alghisi was elected president of the Province of Brescia as the centre-left candidate with 52.8% of the weighted vote, defeating Giorgio Bontempi, the Lega-backed mayor of Agnosine.
