= Daniele Molgora =

Italian politician (born 1962)

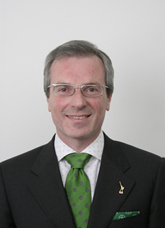
- Molgora in 2008

President of the Province of Brescia
- In office 8 June 2009 – 13 October 2014
- Preceded by: Alberto Cavalli
- Succeeded by: Pier Luigi Mottinelli

Undersecretary of State for the Ministry of Economy and Finance
- In office 11 June 2001 – 17 May 2006
- Prime Minister: Silvio Berlusconi
- In office 12 May 2008 – 20 May 2010
- Prime Minister: Silvio Berlusconi

Member of the Chamber of Deputies
- In office 1994–2006
- In office 2008–2013

Personal details
- Born: 2 April 1962 (age 64) Brescia, Italy
- Party: Lega Nord
- Occupation: Accountant

Daniele Molgora (born 2 April 1962) is an Italian politician of the Lega Nord. He served as president of the Province of Brescia from 2009 to 2014 and as Undersecretary of State at the Ministry of Economy and Finance in the governments of Silvio Berlusconi.
