= List of mayors of Brescia =

Mayor of Brescia
- Sindaca di Brescia

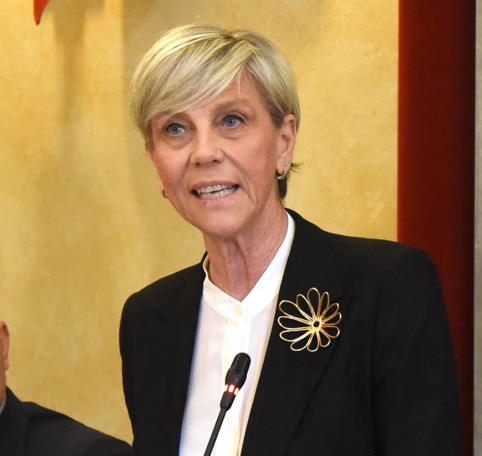
- Incumbent; Laura Castelletti since 20 May 2023
- Style: No title, courtesy or style
- Reports to: Brescia City Council
- Seat: Palazzo della Loggia
- Appointer: Electorate of Brescia
- Term length: 5 years, renewable once
- Formation: 2 March 1860
- Salary: € 5.929,83 per month
- Website: Official website

The mayor of Brescia is an elected politician who, along with the Brescia City Council, is accountable for the strategic government of Brescia in Lombardy, Italy.

The current mayor is Laura Castelletti, elected on 15 May 2023.

== Overview ==
According to the Italian Constitution, the mayor of Brescia is a member of the City Council.

The mayor is elected by the population of Brescia, who also elects the members of the City Council, the legislative body which checks the mayor's policy guidelines and is able to enforce his resignation by a motion of no confidence. The mayor is entitled to appoint and release the members of his executive.

Since 1994 the mayor is elected directly by Brescia's electorate: in all mayoral elections in Italy in cities with a population higher than 15,000 voters express a direct choice for the mayor or an indirect choice voting for the party of the candidate's coalition. If no candidate receives at least 50% of votes, the top two candidates go to a second round after two weeks. The election of the City Council is based on a direct choice for the candidate with a preference vote: the candidate with the majority of the preferences is elected. The number of the seats for each party is determined proportionally on the base of a majority bonus system.

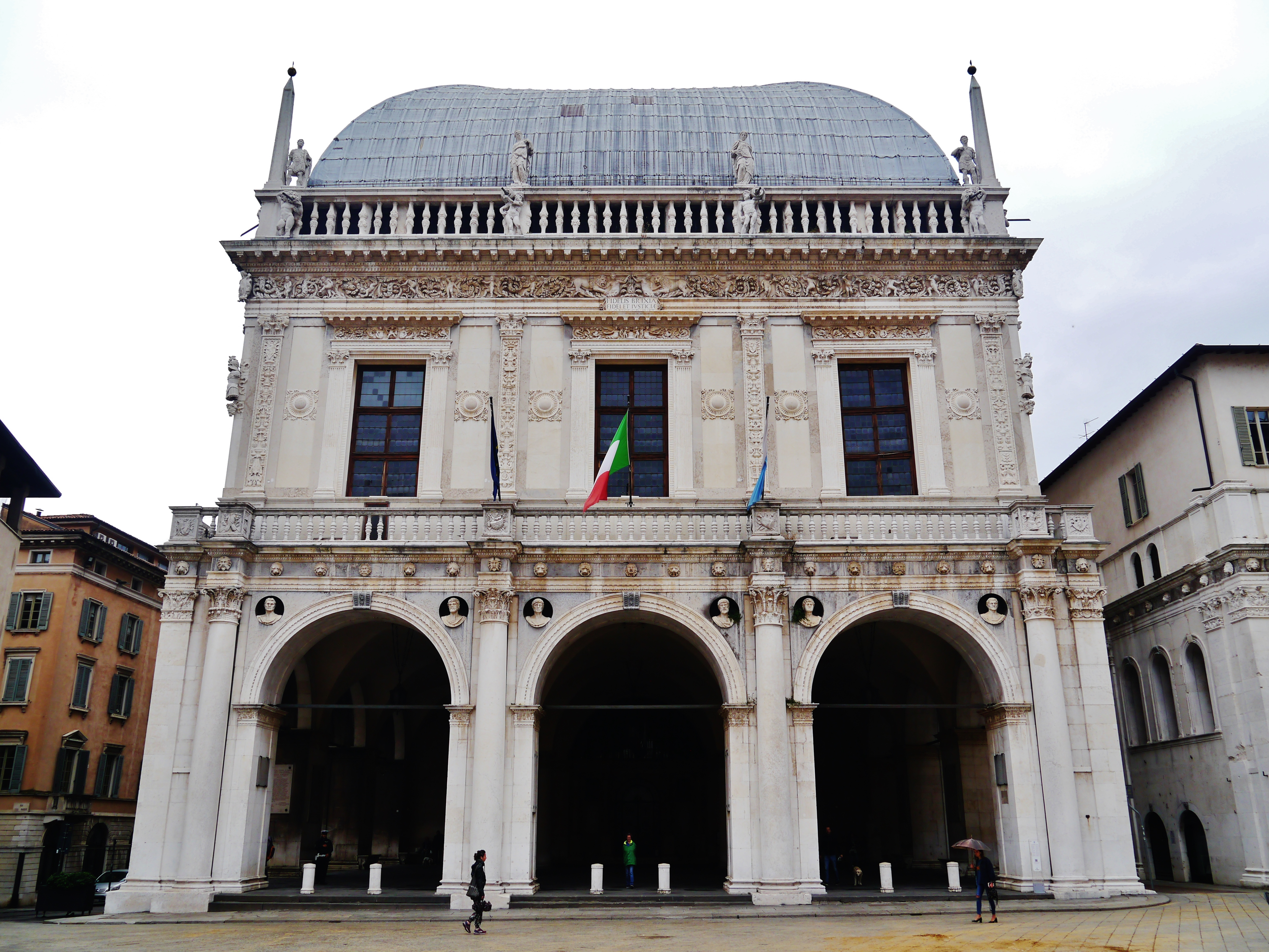
Palazzo della Loggia is the seat of the mayor of Brescia

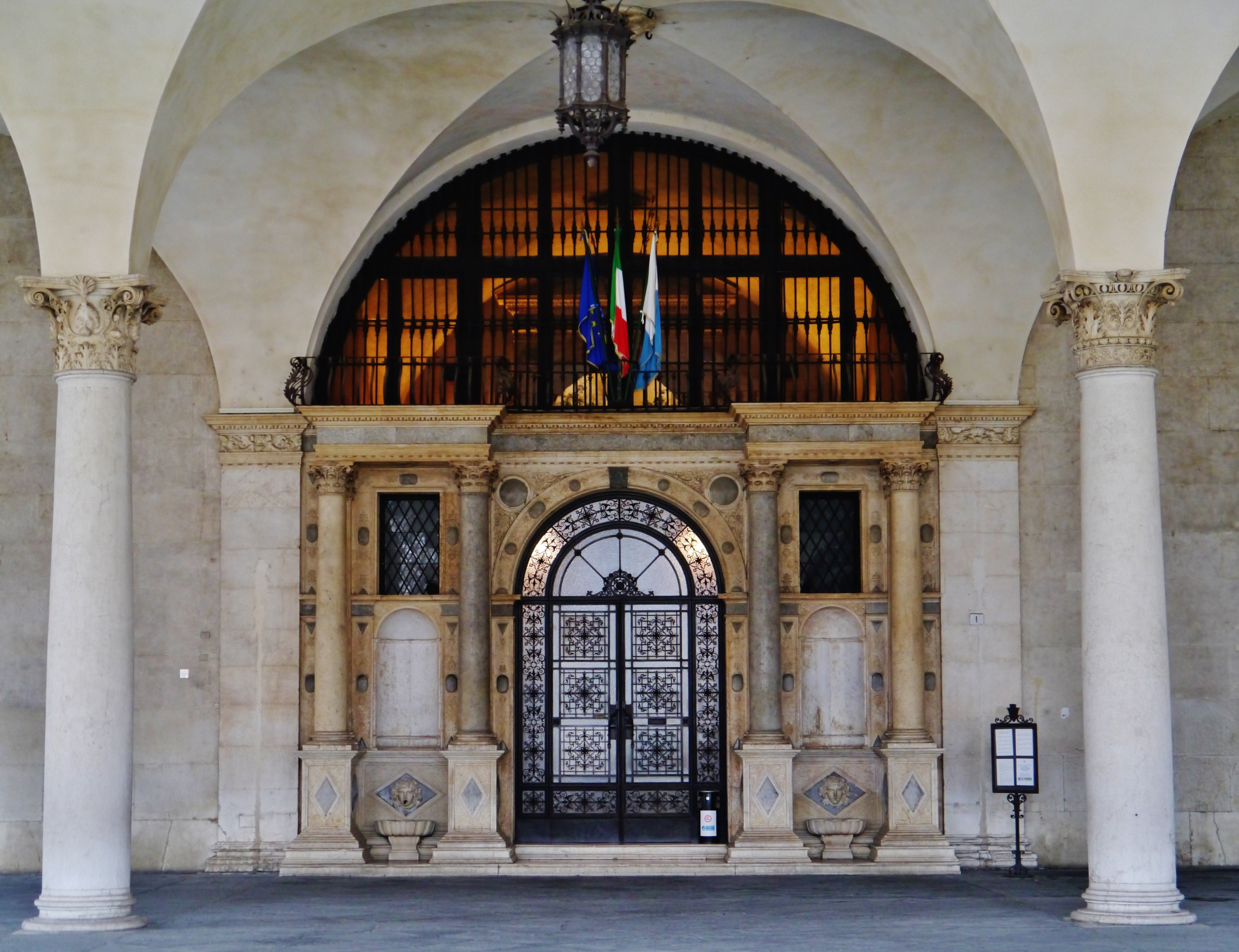
Main entrance to the building

== Podestà ==
=== Kingdom of Italy (1807-1814) ===
	Podestà	Term start	Term end	Appointer
1	Gaetano Maggi di Gradella	1807	1808	Napoleon I of France
2	Tommaso Balucanti	1808	1813	Napoleon I of France
3	Pietro Ducco	1813	1816	Napoleon I of France

=== Kingdom of Lombardy–Venetia (1815-1859) ===
	Podestà	Term start	Term end	Appointer
4	Count Francesco Maggi di Gradella	1816	1819	Francis I of Austria
5	Roberto Corniani	1819	1825	Francis I of Austria
6	Count Giovanni Calini	1825	1829	Francis I of Austria
7	Count Bartolomeo Fenaroli Avogadro	1829	1838	Francis I of Austria
8	Faustino Feroldi	1838	1847	Ferdinand I of Austria
9	Angelo Averoldi	1847	1849	Ferdinand I of Austria
10	Count Luigi Maggi	1849	1855	Franz Joseph I of Austria
11	Alessandro Pirlo	1855	1856	Franz Joseph I of Austria
(9)	Angelo Averoldi	1856	1859	Franz Joseph I of Austria
12	Diogene Valotti (acting)	1859	1860	Victor Emmanuel II of Italy

== Mayors ==
=== Kingdom of Italy (1860–1946) ===
	Mayor	Term start	Term end	Party
Mayors appointed by the King (1860-1889)
1	Tartarino Caprioli (1804–1891)	March 1860	April 1860	Right
–	Nicola Zoppola (acting) (1827–1907)	April 1860	March 1861	Right
2	Diogene Valotti (1830–1910)	March 1861	July 1862	Right
–	Paolo Baruchelli (acting) (1810–1872)	20 July 1862	22 January 1863	Right
–	Giovanni Battista Formentini (acting) (1808–1881)	22 January 1863	16 March 1863	Right
3	Gaetano Facchi (1812–1895)	16 March 1863	22 March 1867	Right
4	Giovanni Battista Formentini (1808–1881)	22 March 1867	24 November 1872	Right
5	Giuseppe Salvadego (1830–1906)	24 November 1872	16 December 1874	Right
(4)	Giovanni Battista Formentini (1808–1881)	16 December 1874	2 February 1880	Right
–	Giuseppe Bonardi (acting) (1836–1898)	2 February 1880	21 September 1880	Left
6	Antonio Barbieri (1828–1886)	21 September 1880	18 December 1882	Left
–	Arturo Finadri (acting) (1856–1924)	18 December 1882	31 July 1883	Left
–	Teodoro Pertusati (acting) (1836–1897)	31 July 1883	7 September 1883	Left
7	Giuseppe Bonardi (1836–1898)	7 September 1883	1 September 1884	Left
–	Paolo Riccardi (acting) (1835–1910)	1 September 1884	27 September 1884	Left
–	Francesco Caprioli (acting) (1833–1916)	27 September 1884	9 May 1885	Right
–	Angelo Tasca	9 May 1885	4 July 1885	Special Commissioner
(7)	Giuseppe Bonardi (1836–1898)	4 July 1885	18 November 1889	Left
Mayors elected by the City Council (1889-1926)
(7)	Giuseppe Bonardi (1836–1898)	18 November 1889	11 May 1895	Left
8	Francesco Bettoni-Cazzago (1835–1898)	11 May 1895	12 May 1898	Right
–	Giovanni Gottardi (acting) (1840–1915)	12 May 1898	9 August 1898	Right
9	Carlo Fisogni (1854–1936)	9 August 1898	23 July 1902	Right
–	Vittorio Ballauri	23 July 1902	18 August 1902	Special Commissioner
10	Federico Bettoni-Cazzago (1865–1923)	18 August 1902	17 December 1904	Left
–	Nunzio Vitelli	17 December 1904	9 March 1906	Special Commissioner
11	Vincenzo Bettoni-Cazzago (1856–1924)	9 March 1905	3 September 1906	Right
–	Enrico Cerboni	3 September 1906	1 December 1906	Special Commissioner
12	Girolamo Orefici (1867–1932)	1 December 1906	26 October 1912	Left
–	Paolo Cuzzetti (acting) (1855–1925)	26 October 1912	12 July 1914	Left
–	Giuseppe Ajroldi	12 July 1914	9 March 1915	Special Commissioner
13	Dominatore Mainetti (1861–1920)	9 March 1915	17 July 1919	Liberal
–	Arturo Reggio (acting) (1879–1959)	17 July 1919	19 November 1920	Liberal
14	Luigi Gadola (1861–1930)	19 November 1920	30 March 1923	Independent
–	Antonio Zanon	30 March 1923	17 July 1924	Special Commissioner
–	Vittorio Buti	17 July 1924	March 1925	Special Commissioner
–	Salvatore Portelli	March 1925	7 March 1926	Special Commissioner
–	Antonio Amorth	7 March 1926	18 March 1926	Special Commissioner
–	Pietro Calzoni	18 March 1926	16 December 1926	Special Commissioner
Fascist Podestà (1926-1945)
1	Pietro Calzoni (1870–1957)	December 1926	January 1933	PNF
–	Osvaldo Bolis	January 1933	March 1933	Special Commissioner
2	Fausto Lechi (1892–1979)	March 1933	March 1937	PNF
–	Renato Pascucci	March 1937	September 1937	Special Commissioner
3	Pietro Bersi	September 1937	February 1943	PNF
4	Innocente Dugnani (1902–1971)	February 1943	July 1943	PNF
–	Giuseppe Cacciatore (acting)	July 1943	August 1943	PNF
–	Osvaldo Bolis	August 1943	September 1943	Special Commissioner
(4)	Innocente Dugnani (1902–1971)	September 1943	May 1944	PFR
5	Ruggero Friggeri	May 1944	April 1945	PFR
Allied occupation (1945-1946)
15	Guglielmo Ghislandi (1887–1965)	1 May 1945	30 April 1946	PSI

=== Republic of Italy (since 1946) ===
==== City Council election (1946–1994) ====
From 1946 to 1994 the mayor of Brescia was elected by the City Council.

	Mayor	Term start	Term end	Party	Coalition	Election
1	Guglielmo Ghislandi (1887–1965)	30 April 1946	16 June 1948	PSI	CLN	1946
2	Bruno Boni (1918–1998)	16 June 1948	11 July 1949	DC	DC • PSI • PCI	1946
2	Bruno Boni (1918–1998)	11 July 1949	18 June 1951	DC	DC • PLI • PSDI	1946
2	Bruno Boni (1918–1998)	18 June 1951	18 June 1956	DC	DC • PLI • PSDI	1951
2	Bruno Boni (1918–1998)	18 June 1956	10 December 1960	DC	DC • PLI • PSDI	1956
2	Bruno Boni (1918–1998)	10 December 1960	22 December 1964	DC	DC • PLI • PSDI	1960
2	Bruno Boni (1918–1998)	22 December 1964	29 July 1970	DC	DC • PSI • PSDI	1964
2	Bruno Boni (1918–1998)	29 July 1970	15 May 1975 (Note: Resigned after being elected President of the Province of Brescia. The deputy mayor held the office till the City Council elected a new mayor.)	DC	DC • PSI • PSDI	1970
3	Cesare Trebeschi (1925–2020)	28 July 1975	20 October 1980	DC	DC • PSI • PSDI • PRI	1975
3	Cesare Trebeschi (1925–2020)	20 October 1980	14 October 1985	DC	DC • PSI • PSDI • PRI	1980
4	Pietro Padula (1934–2009)	14 October 1985	12 August 1990	DC	DC • PSI • PSDI • PRI • PLI	1985
5	Gianni Boninsegna (1923–1993)	12 August 1990	15 September 1991	DC	DC • PSI • PRI • PLI	1990
–	Goffredo Sottile	15 September 1991	27 January 1992	-	Special commissioner (Note: Nominated by the prefect after the City Council failed to elect a new mayor.)	
6	Gianni Panella (1948–2003)	27 January 1992	27 September 1992	PSI	DC • PSI • PLI	1991
7	Paolo Corsini (b. 1947)	27 September 1992	13 June 1994	PDS	DC • PDS • PSI • FdV	1991
–	Roberto Frassinet	13 June 1994	25 July 1994	-	Special commissioner (Note: Nominated by the prefect after the mayor and the members of the City Council resigned in order to hold a new election under the provision of the new local electoral law.)	
–	Romano Fusco	25 July 1994	5 December 1994	-	Special commissioner	

==== Direct election (since 1994) ====
Since 1994, under provisions of the new local electoral law (Law 25 March 1993, n. 81), the mayor of Brescia is chosen by direct election, originally every four and since 1998 every five years.

	Mayor	Term start	Term end	Party	Coalition	Election
8	Mino Martinazzoli (1931–2011)	5 December 1994	14 December 1998	PPI	PDS • PPI	1994
(7)	Paolo Corsini (b. 1947)	14 December 1998	10 June 2003	DS; PD	The Olive Tree (DS-PPI-SDI-FdV)	1998
(7)	Paolo Corsini (b. 1947)	10 June 2003	8 March 2008 (Note: Resigned in order to participate to the national general elections. The Deputy Mayor Luigi Gaffurini (PD) held the office till a new municipal election was held.)	DS; PD	The Olive Tree (DS-DL-SDI-FdV)	2003
–	Luigi Gaffurini (acting) (b. 1948)	8 March 2008	17 April 2008	PD	The Olive Tree (DS-DL-SDI-FdV)	2003
9	Adriano Paroli (b. 1962)	17 April 2008	12 June 2013	PdL	PdL • LN • UDC	2008
10	Emilio Del Bono (b. 1965)	12 June 2013	14 June 2018	PD	PD • SEL and leftist lists	2013
10	Emilio Del Bono (b. 1965)	14 June 2018	31 March 2023 (Note: Resigned after being elected regional councillor. The Deputy Mayor Laura Castelletti (Ind) held the office till a new municipal election was held.)	PD	PD • SI and leftist lists	2018
–	Laura Castelletti (b. 1962)	31 March 2023	20 May 2023	Ind	PD • SI and leftist lists	2018
11	Laura Castelletti (b. 1962)	20 May 2023	Incumbent	Ind	PD • A • EV • SI and leftist lists	2023

==== By time in office ====
Rank	Mayor	Political Party	Total time in office	Terms
1	Bruno Boni	DC	26 years, 333 days	6
2	Paolo Corsini	PDS / DS	10 years, 346 days	3
3	Cesare Trebeschi	DC	10 years, 78 days	2
4	Emilio Del Bono	PD	9 years, 292 days	2
5	Adriano Paroli	PdL	5 years, 56 days	1
6	Pietro Padula	DC	4 years, 304 days	1
7	Mino Martinazzoli	PPI	4 years, 9 days	1
8	Laura Castelletti	Ind	3 years, 111 days	1
9	Guglielmo Ghislandi	PSI	2 years, 47 days	1
10	Gianni Boninsegna	DC	1 year, 34 days	1
11	Gianni Panella	PSI	244 days	1

== Elections ==
=== City Council elections, 1946–1991 ===
Results

Number of votes for each party:

Election	DC	PCI	PSI	PLI	PRI	PSDI	MSI	LN	Others	Total
31 March 1946	32,678 (43.6%)	17,534 (23.4%)	19,511 (26.1%)	2,902 (3.9%)	2,248 (3.0%)	-	-		-	74,873
27 May 1951	36,693 (43.7%)	13,437 (16.0%)	12,769 (15.2%)	2,168 (2.6%)	1,376 (1.6%)	6,756 (8.1%)	6,732 (8.0%)		3,700 (4.4%)	83,901
27 May 1956	43,004 (46.2%)	13,948 (15.0%)	15,970 (17.2%)	3,126 (3.4%)	-	5,801 (6.2%)	6,249 (6.7%)		4,887 (5.2%)	92,985
6 November 1960	46,360 (44.5%)	17,235 (16.6%)	18,391 (17.8%)	5,338 (5.1%)	1,088 (0.4%)	6,648 (6.5%)	6,745 (6.6%)		2,294 (2.2%)	104,099
22 November 1964	47,372 (41.1%)	21,181 (18.4%)	13,516 (11.7%)	13,372 (11.6%)	1,856 (0.7%)	8,657 (7.5%)	6,752 (5.7%)		3,668 (3.2%)	115,260
7 June 1970	52,460 (39.6%)	26,131 (19.7%)	14,124 (10.6%)	9,992 (7.5%)	4,393 (3.3%)	12,469 (9.4%)	7,712 (5.8%)		5,305 (4.0%)	132,588
15 June 1975	56,204 (38.5%)	39,793 (27.3%)	19,797 (13.6%)	6,553 (4.5%)	5,329 (3.6%)	7,361 (5.0%)	9,109 (6.2%)		887 (0.6%)	145,932
8 June 1980	55,194 (39.1%)	37,070 (26.2%)	16,198 (11.5%)	6,536 (4.6%)	5,386 (3.8%)	7,751 (5.5%)	8,490 (6.0%)		4,648 (3.2%)	141,273
12 May 1985	55,541 (38.0%)	36,262 (24.8%)	18,825 (12.9%)	5,517 (3.8%)	7,951 (5.4%)	4,560 (3.1%)	9,690 (6.6%)		7,833 (5.4%)	146,179
6 May 1990	46,588 (32.5%)	23,939 (16.7%)	18,776 (13.1%)	2,784 (1.9%)	5,305 (3.7%)	2,450 (1.7%)	3,823 (2.7%)	29,892 (20.4%)	11,601 (8.1%)	143,309
24 November 1991 (Note: First snap election ever.)	34,410 (24.3%)	13,377 (Note: As Democratic Party of the Left (PDS).) (9.5%)	14,609 (10.3%)	4,733 (3.3%)	7,842 (5.5%)	2,274 (1.6%)	5,287 (3.7%)	34,482 (24.4%)	24,302 (17.2%)	141,316

Notes

Number of seats in the City Coucl for each party:

Election	DC	PCI	PSI	PLI	PRI	PSDI	MSI	LN	Others	Total
31 March 1946	22	12	13	2	1	-	-		-	50
27 May 1951	28	6	5	2	1	3	3		2	50
27 May 1956	25	8	9	1	-	3	3		1	50
6 November 1960	24	8	9	2	-	3	3		1	50
22 November 1964	21	9	6	6	-	4	3		1	50
7 June 1970	21	10	5	4	1	4	3		2	50
15 June 1975	21	14	6	2	2	2	3		-	50
8 June 1980	21	14	6	2	2	2	3		-	50
12 May 1985	20	13	7	2	2	1	3		2	50
6 May 1990	16	9	7	1	2	-	1	11	3	50
24 November 1991 (Note: First snap election ever.)	13	5 (Note: As Democratic Party of the Left (PDS).)	5	1	3	-	2	14	7	50

=== Mayoral and City Council election, 1994 ===
The election took place on two rounds: the first on 20 November, the second on 4 December 1994.

Results

Summary of the 1994 Brescia City Council election results
Parties and coalitions		Votes	%	Seats
Democratic Party of the Left (Partito Democratico della Sinistra)	PDS	22,606	20.39	11
Italian People's Party (Partito Popolare Italiano)	PPI	22,227	20.05	10
Others		8,656	7.81	3
Martinazzoli coalition (Centre-left)		53,489	48.25	24
Lega Nord	LN	17,416	15.71	6
Forza Italia	FI	13,416	12.10	4
Gnutti coalition (Centre-right)		30,832	27.81	10
National Alliance (Alleanza Nazionale)	AN	13,460	12.14	4
Communist Refoundation Party (Rifondazione Comunista)	PRC	8,647	7.80	2
Others		4,430	3.99	0
Total		110,858	100.00	40
Votes cast / turnout		141,623	86.10	
Registered voters		164,490		
Source: Ministry of the Interior

Candidate	Party	Coalition	First round		Second round	
Candidate	Party	Coalition	Votes	%	Votes	%
Mino Martinazzoli	PPI	PDS-PPI	55,905	41.14	65,899	56.47
Vito Gnutti	LN	Pole of Freedoms	36,365	26.76	50,799	43.53
Viviana Beccalossi	AN		16,236	11.95		
Angelo Rampinelli Rota	Ind		14,085	10.37		
Fausto Manara	PRC		11,203	8.24		
Others			2,093	1.55		
Eligible voters			164,490	100.00	164,490	100.00
Voted			141,623	86.10	122,396	74.41
Blank or invalid ballots			5,736		5,698	
Total valid votes			135,887		116,698	

=== Mayoral and City Council election, 1998 ===
The election took place on two rounds: the first on 29 November, the second on 13 December 1998.

Results

Summary of the 1998 Brescia City Council election results
Parties and coalitions		Votes	%	Seats
Democrats of the Left (Democratici di Sinistra)	DS	12,520	13.13	9
Italian Democratic Socialists (Socialisti Democratici Italiani)	SDI	10,338	10.84	7
Italian People's Party (Partito Popolare Italiano)	PPI	8,142	8.54	5
Federation of the Greens (Federazione dei Verdi)	FdV	2,110	2.21	1
Others		5,785	6.06	2
Corsini coalition (Centre-left)		38,895	40.78	24
Forza Italia	FI	18,310	19.20	7
National Alliance (Alleanza Nazionale)	AN	11,869	12.45	3
Others		1,559	1.63	0
Dalla Bona coalition (Centre-right)		31,738	33.28	10
Lega Nord & allies	LN	18,495	19.39	5
Communist Refoundation Party (Rifondazione Comunista)	PRC	3,488	3.66	1
Others		2,755	2.88	0
Total		95,371	100.00	40
Votes cast / turnout		124,360	77.07	
Registered voters		161,358		
Source: Ministry of the Interior

Candidate	Party	Coalition	First round		Second round	
Candidate	Party	Coalition	Votes	%	Votes	%
Paolo Corsini	DS	The Olive Tree	49,606	41.77	50,422	53.13
Giovanni Dalla Bona	FI	Pole for Freedoms	39,098	32.92	44,486	46.87
Cesare Galli	LN		23,453	19.75		
Lamberto Lombardi	PRC		3,560	3.00		
Others			3,043	2.56		
Eligible voters			161,358	100.00	161,358	100.00
Voted			124,360	77.07	97,884	60.66
Blank or invalid ballots			5,600		2,976	
Total valid votes			118,760		94,908	

=== Mayoral and City Council election, 2003 ===
The election took place on two rounds: the first on 25–26 May, the second on 8–9 June 2003. (Note: Under the provisions of the new local administration law (Legislative Decree 18 August 2000, n. 267), which reintroduced the five years term for City Councils and directly-elected Mayors, the election would have been scheduled for December 2003. Nonetheless since 1999 local elections in Italy have always taken place between April and June. For this reason the 2003 election was anticipated on 25–26 May that year.)

Results

Summary of the 2003 Brescia City Council election results
Parties and coalitions		Votes	%	Seats
Democrats of the Left (Democratici di Sinistra)	DS	16,245	17.57	9
The Daisy (La Margherita)	DL	10,172	11.00	6
Italian Democratic Socialists (Socialisti Democratici Italiani)	SDI	5,094	5.51	3
Federation of the Greens (Federazione dei Verdi)	FdV	1,758	1.90	1
Others		12,433	13.45	5
Corsini coalition (Centre-left)		45,702	49.44	24
Forza Italia	FI	11,999	12.98	5
National Alliance (Alleanza Nazionale)	AN	8,207	8.88	4
Union of the Centre (Unione di Centro)	UDC	3,570	3.86	1
Others		6,156	6.65	1
Beccalossi coalition (Centre-right)		29,932	32.37	11
Lega Nord & allies	LN	11,175	12.75	4
Communist Refoundation Party (Rifondazione Comunista)	PRC	3,008	3.25	1
Others		2,027	2.19	0
Total		92,444	100.00	40
Votes cast / turnout		120,013	77.14	
Registered voters		155,570		
Source: Ministry of the Interior

Candidate	Party	Coalition	First round		Second round	
Candidate	Party	Coalition	Votes	%	Votes	%
Paolo Corsini	DS	The Olive Tree	54,866	47.14	59,368	53.73
Viviana Beccalossi	AN	House of Freedoms	37,305	32.05	51,129	46.27
Cesare Galli	LN		18,990	16.32		
Marco Lombardi	PRC		2,775	2.38		
Others			2,448	2.11		
Eligible voters			155,570	100.00	155,570	100.00
Voted			120,013	77.14	112,471	72.30
Blank or invalid ballots			3,629		1,974	
Total valid votes			116,384		110,497	

=== Mayoral and City Council election, 2008 ===
The election took place on 13–14 April 2008, the same dates of the national general election.

Results

Summary of the 2008 Brescia City Council election results
Parties and coalitions		Votes	%	Seats
The People of Freedom (Il Popolo della Libertà)	PdL	28,985	28.32	14
Lega Nord	LN	16,222	15.85	8
Union of the Centre (Unione di Centro)	UDC	3,939	3.85	2
Others		2,448	2.40	0
Paroli coalition (Centre-right)		51,594	50.41	24
Democratic Party (Partito Democratico)	PD	28,594	27.94	12
Rainbow Left (Sinistra Arcobaleno)	SA	3,651	3.57	1
Italy of Values (Italia dei Valori)	IdV	2,824	2.76	1
Others		2,576	2.52	0
Del Bono coalition (Centre-left)		37,645	36.78	14
Brescia for Passion (Brescia per Passione)	BpP	6,477	6.33	2
Others		6,641	6.49	0
Total		102,357	100.00	40
Votes cast / turnout		123,205	84.91	
Registered voters		145,103		
Source: Ministry of the Interior

Candidate	Party	Coalition	First round	
Candidate	Party	Coalition	Votes	%
Adriano Paroli	PdL	PdL-LN-UDC	61,011	51.39
Emilio Del Bono	PD	PD-SA-IdV	42,460	35.77
Laura Castelletti	BpP		7,835	6.60
Others			7,410	6.25
Eligible voters			145,103	100.00
Voted			123,205	84.91
Blank or invalid ballots			4,489	
Total valid votes			118,716	

=== Mayoral and City Council election, 2013 ===
The election took place on two rounds: the first on 26–27 May, the second on 9–10 June 2013.

Results

Summary of the 2013 Brescia City Council election results
Parties and coalitions		Votes	%	Seats
Democratic Party (Partito Democratico)	PD	21,254	27.38	13
Brescia for Passion (Brescia per Passione) (Note: Officially endorsed the centre-left candidate only on the second round.)	BpP	4,555	5.87	3
Del Bono List (Lista Del Bono)		4,095	5.28	2
At Work with Brescia (Al Lavoro con Brescia)	SEL	3,564	4.59	2
Others		1,504	1.94	0
Del Bono coalition (Centre-left)		34,972	45.06	20
The People of Freedom (Il Popolo della Libertà)	PdL	11,180	14.40	5
X Civic Brescia (X Brescia Civica)	XBC	7,463	9.62	3
Lega Nord	LN	6,724	8.66	2
Brothers of Italy (Fratelli d'Italia)	FdI	2,132	2.75	0
Union of the Centre (Unione di Centro)	UDC	1,942	2.50	0
Others		1,212	1.57	0
Paroli coalition (Centre-right)		30,653	39.49	10
Five Star Movement (Movimento Cinque Stelle)	M5S	5,238	6.75	1
Civic Platform (Piattaforma Civica)	PC	4,904	6.32	1
Others		1,847	2.39	0
Total		77,614	100.00	32
Votes cast / turnout		92,950	65.55	
Registered voters		141,795		
Source: Ministry of the Interior

Candidate	Party	Coalition	First round		Second round	
Candidate	Party	Coalition	Votes	%	Votes	%
Emilio Del Bono	PD	PD-SEL-FdV-PSI	34,373	38.07	46,850	56.53
Adriano Paroli	PdL	PdL-LN-SC-UDC-FdI-PP	34,323	38.01	36,027	43.47
Francesco Onofri	PC		6,711	7.43		
Laura Gamba	M5S		6,588	7.30		
Laura Castelletti	BpP		6,247	6.92		
Others			2,058	2.28		
Eligible voters			141,795	100.00	141,795	100.00
Voted			92,950	65.55	84,048	59.27
Blank or invalid ballots			2,650		1,171	
Total valid votes			90,300		82,877	

=== Mayoral and City Council election, 2018 ===
The election took place on 10 June 2018.

Results

Summary of the 2018 Brescia City Council election results
Parties and coalitions		Votes	%	Seats
Democratic Party (Partito Democratico)	PD	26,864	34.62	15
Del Bono List (Lista Del Bono)		5,177	6.67	2
Brescia for Passion (Brescia per Passione)	BpP	4,320	5.57	2
Left in Brescia (Sinistra a Brescia)	SI	2,511	3.23	1
Others		2,312	2.96	0
Del Bono coalition (Centre-left)		41,184	53.08	20
Lega	L	18,758	24.17	7
Forza Italia	FI	5,867	7.56	3
Brothers of Italy (Fratelli d'Italia)	FdI	2,560	3.29	1
Union of the Centre (Unione di Centro)	UDC	750	0.96	0
The People of the Family (Il Popolo della Famiglia)	PdF	586	0.75	0
Others		1,450	1.86	0
Vilardi coalition (Centre-right)		29,971	38.62	11
Five Star Movement (Movimento Cinque Stelle)	M5S	4,340	5.59	1
Others		2,092	2.67	0
Total		77,587	100.00	32
Votes cast / turnout		83,276	57.40	
Registered voters		145,064		
Source: Ministry of the Interior

Candidate	Party	Coalition	First round	
Candidate	Party	Coalition	Votes	%
Emilio Del Bono	PD	PD-SI-FdV-PSI	44,237	53.86
Paola Vilardi	FI	FI-L-UDC-FdI-PdF	31,294	38.10
Guido Ghidini	M5S		4,478	5.45
Others			2,118	2.55
Eligible voters			145,064	100.00
Voted			83,276	57.40
Blank or invalid ballots			1,137	
Total valid votes			82,127	

=== Mayoral and City Council election, 2023 ===
The election took place on 14–15 May 2023.

Results

Summary of the 2023 Brescia City Council election results
Parties and coalitions		Votes	%	Seats
Democratic Party (Partito Democratico)	PD	21,060	26.64	11
Castelletti List (Lista Castelletti)		6,223	7.87	3
Action–Italia Viva–More Europe (Azione–Italia Viva–Più Europa)	A-IV +E	5,564	7.04	3
Brescia Capital (Brescia Capitale)		2,738	3.46	1
Active Brescia (Brescia Attiva)	EV	2,228	2.82	1
At Work with Brescia (Al Lavoro con Brescia)	SI	2,205	2.79	1
Others		2,758	3.49	0
Castelletti coalition (Centre-left)		42,776	54.10	20
Brothers of Italy (Fratelli d'Italia)	FdI	13,062	16.52	5
Rolfi List (Lista Rolfi)		9,237	11.68	4
Lega	L	5,957	7.53	2
Forza Italia	FI	3,091	3.91	1
Others		2,031	2.57	0
Rolfi coalition (Centre-right)		33,378	42.22	12
Others		2,909	3.68	0
Total		79,063	100.00	32
Votes cast / turnout		85,559	57.84	
Registered voters		147,916		
Source: Ministry of the Interior

Candidate	Party	Coalition	First round	
Candidate	Party	Coalition	Votes	%
Laura Castelletti	Ind	PD-A-IV-+E-SI-EV-PSI-Pos-Volt	46,198	54.84
Fabio Rolfi	L	FdI-L-FI-NM	35,108	41.67
Alessandro Lucà	M5S	M5S-UP-PCI	2,088	2.48
Others			851	1.01
Eligible voters			147,916	100.00
Voted			85,559	57.84
Blank or invalid ballots			1,314	
Total valid votes			84,245	

== Deputy Mayor ==
The office of the deputy mayor of Brescia was officially created in 1994 with the adoption of the new local administration law. The deputy mayor is nominated and eventually dismissed by the mayor. Here is a list of deputy mayors of Brescia:

	Deputy	Term start	Term end	Party	Mayor
1	Paolo Corsini	14 December 1994	29 March 1996 (Note: Resigned in order to participate in the national general election.)	PDS	Martinazzoli
2	Giovanni Comboni	29 March 1996	14 December 1998	PDS	Martinazzoli
3	Giuseppe Onofri	21 December 1998	10 June 2003	PPI	Corsini
4	Luigi Morgano	30 June 2003	12 December 2007 (Note: Resigned.)	DL	Corsini
5	Luigi Gaffurini	19 December 2007	17 April 2008	DL	Corsini
6	Fabio Rolfi	23 April 2008	27 March 2013 (Note: Resigned after being elected regional councillor.)	LN	Paroli
7	Silvano Pedretti	27 March 2013	12 June 2013	Ind	Paroli
8	Laura Castelletti	24 June 2013	14 June 2018	Ind	Del Bono
8	Laura Castelletti	26 June 2018	20 May 2023	Ind	Del Bono
9	Federico Manzoni	20 May 2023	Incumbent	PD	Castelletti
