= Adriano Paroli =

Italian politician and lawyer, former Mayor of Brescia

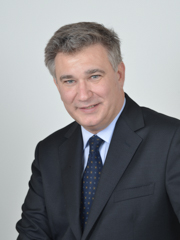

Mayor of Brescia
- In office 17 April 2008 – 12 June 2013
- Preceded by: Paolo Corsini
- Succeeded by: Emilio Del Bono

Member of the Senate
- Incumbent
- Assumed office 23 March 2018
- Constituency: Brescia

Member of the Chamber of Deputies
- In office 9 May 1996 – 17 January 2012
- Constituency: Desenzano

Personal details
- Born: 30 March 1962 (age 64) Brescia, Italy
- Party: DC (till 1994); FI (1994-2009); PdL (2009-2013); FI (since 2013)
- Education: University of Milan
- Occupation: Politician, lawyer

Adriano Paroli (born 30 March 1962) is an Italian politician and lawyer, former mayor of Brescia from 2008 to 2013.

== Biography ==
Graduated in Law at the University of Milan, Paroli joined Communion and Liberation when he was very young. He has been elected to the city council of Brescia with the Christian Democracy in 1991.

Paroli joined Silvio Berlusconi's Forza Italia in 1994 and ran for the office of president of the province of Brescia, without being elected. He was later elected in the Chamber of Deputies in the 1996, 2001, 2006 and 2008 general election.

In 2008 Paroli was elected Mayor of Brescia, defeating the centre-left candidate Emilio Del Bono. He ran for a second term in 2013 but he was defeated by Del Bono.

In the 2018 general election Paroli has been elected to the Senate.

== Electoral history ==
Election	House	Constituency	Party	Votes	Result
1996	Chamber of Deputies	Desenzano del Garda	FI	29,766	Elected
2001	Chamber of Deputies	Desenzano del Garda	FI	49,461	Elected
2006	Chamber of Deputies	Lombardy 2	FI	– (Note: Elected in a closed list proportional representation system.)	Elected
2008	Chamber of Deputies	Lombardy 2	PdL	–	Elected
2018	Senate of the Republic	Brescia	FI	135,094	Elected
2022	Senate of the Republic	Lombardy 1	FI	–	Elected

Political offices
Preceded by Paolo Corsini	Mayor of Brescia; 2008–2013	Succeeded by Emilio Del Bono
