= Emanuele Moraschini =

Italian politician (born 1975)

President of the Province of Brescia
- Incumbent
- Assumed office 30 January 2023
- Preceded by: Samuele Alghisi

Mayor of Esine
- Incumbent
- Assumed office 5 June 2016
- Preceded by: Fiorino Fenini

Personal details
- Born: 17 October 1975 (age 50) Iseo, Lombardy, Italy
- Occupation: Financial advisor

Emanuele Moraschini (born 17 October 1975) is an Italian politician serving as president of the Province of Brescia since 2023. He has served as mayor of Esine since 2016.

In January 2023, Moraschini was elected president of the Province of Brescia proposed by Brothers of Italy as the result of an agreement between the centre-right and centre-left.

In August 2023, Moraschini denied patronage to the Brescia Pride, stating that the event concerned political and social issues outside the Province's competences and that the administration preferred to remain neutral. The decision was opposed by the province's vice president, Antonio Bazzani of the Democratic Party, who expressed support for the event and its organisers.
