= Alberto Cavalli =

Italian politician (born 1953)

President of the Province of Brescia
- In office 27 June 1999 – 7 June 2009
- Preceded by: Andrea Lepidi
- Succeeded by: Daniele Molgora

Undersecretary to the President of Lombardy for Universities
- In office 20 April 2010 – 20 October 2012
- President: Roberto Formigoni

Regional assessor for Commerce and Tourism of Lombardy
- In office 19 March 2013 – 22 April 2014
- President: Roberto Maroni

Regional assessor for Infrastructure and Transport of Lombardy
- In office 22 April 2014 – 10 December 2014
- President: Roberto Maroni

Member of the Regional Council of Lombardy
- In office 27 March 2013 – 26 March 2018

Personal details
- Born: 17 March 1953 (age 73) Brescia, Italy
- Party: Forza Italia (1994–2009); The People of Freedom (2009–2013); Forza Italia (2013–present)
- Education: Università Iuav di Venezia
- Occupation: Architect

Alberto Cavalli (born 17 March 1953) is an Italian politician and architect. A member of Forza Italia, he served as president of the Province of Brescia from 1999 to 2009 and as a regional assessor in Lombardy from 2010 to 2014.
