= Tarcisio Gitti =

Italian lawyer and politician (1936–2018)

Ciso Gitti
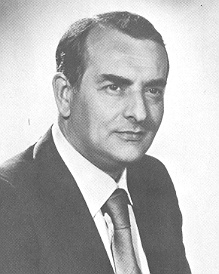

Vice President of the Chamber of Deputies
- In office 1992–1994
- President: Giorgio Napolitano

Undersecretary of the Treasury of Italy
- In office 30 July 1987 – 22 July 1989

Member of the Chamber of Deputies
- In office 1979–1994

President of the Province of Brescia
- In office 22 June 1972 – 15 May 1975
- Preceded by: Mino Martinazzoli
- Succeeded by: Bruno Boni

Personal details
- Born: 18 April 1936 Gardone Val Trompia, Italy
- Died: 6 May 2018 (aged 82) Brescia, Italy
- Party: Christian Democracy (1979–1994); Italian People's Party (1994)
- Children: Gregorio Gitti
- Parent: Salvatore Angelo Gitti
- Profession: Lawyer; politician

Tarcisio "Ciso" Gitti (18 April 1936 – 6 May 2018) was an Italian lawyer and politician. Born in Gardone Val Trompia, he was the son of Salvatore Angelo Gitti, a member of the Chamber of Deputies. He was a lawyer by profession, and was President of the Province of Brescia from 1972 to 1975. He was elected to the Chamber of Deputies in 1979 and served until 1994. He was Undersecretary of the Treasury from 30 July 1897 to 22 July 1989, and President of COPASIR from 29 January 1991 to 22 April 1992. From 1992 to 1994, he was Vice President of the Chamber of Deputies. He was a member of the Christian Democracy (DC) party, but joined the Italian People's Party in 1994 after the DC's collapse.

Gitti died in Brescia of the evening of 6 May 2018, aged 82. His son, Gregorio Gitti, is a Democratic member of the Chamber of Deputies and a consultant to Giovanni Bazoli, former President of Intesa Sanpaolo.
