= Diogene Valotti =

Italian politician (1830–1910)

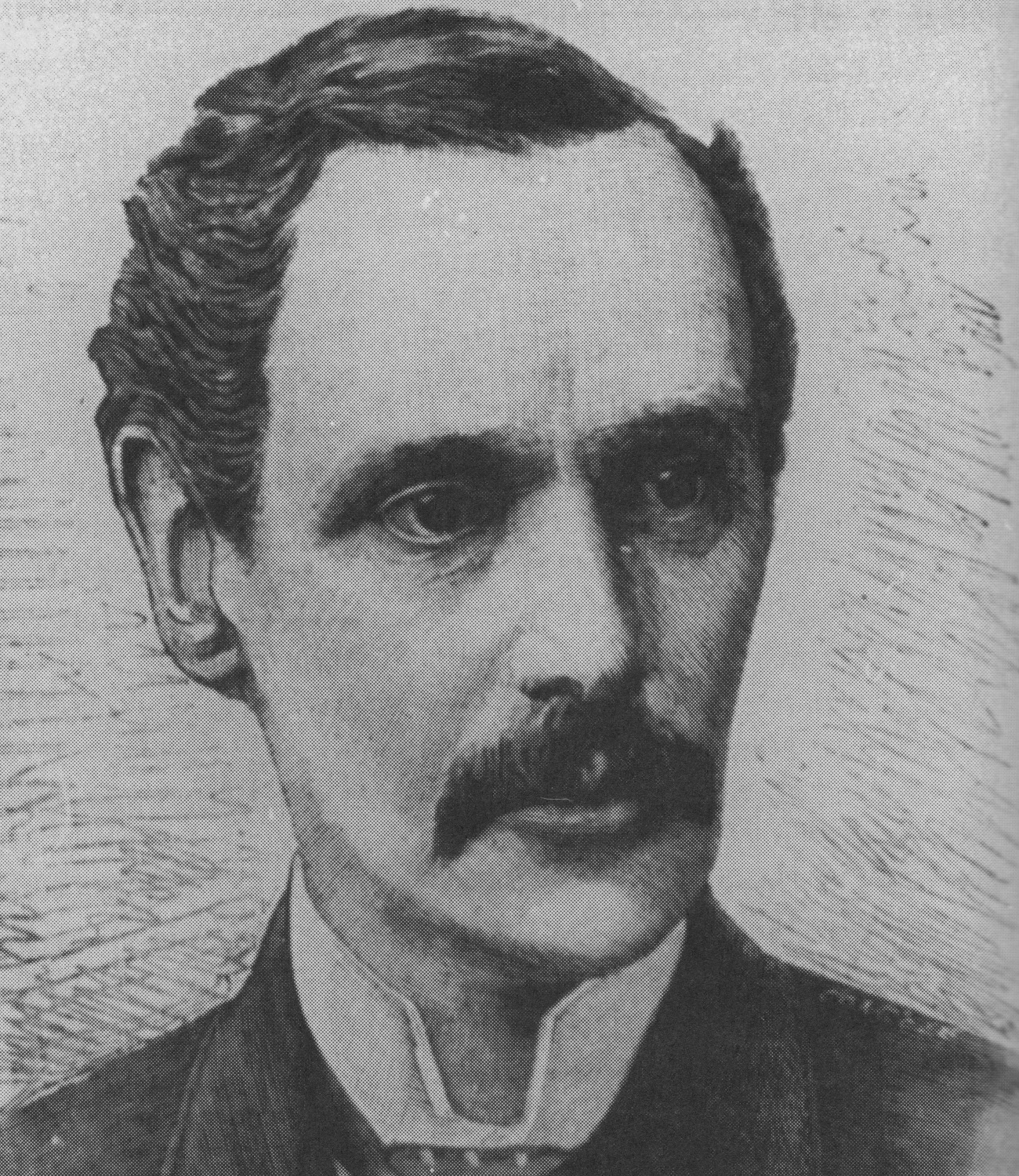

Mayor of Brescia
- In office March 1861 – 20 July 1862
- Preceded by: Tartarino Caprioli
- Succeeded by: Gaetano Facchi

Member of the Chamber of Deputies
- In office 10 March 1867 – 30 March 1867
- Constituency: Verolanuova

President of the Provincial Council of Brescia
- In office 16 September 1867 – 1873
- Preceded by: Giovanni Martinengo
- Succeeded by: Marino Ballini
- In office 9 August 1975 – 1880
- Preceded by: Marino Ballini
- Succeeded by: Giovanni Luscia

President of the Province of Brescia
- In office 2 December 1889 – 18 September 1891
- Succeeded by: Angelo Manzini

Senator of the Kingdom of Italy
- In office 18 March 1889 – 29 May 1910

Personal details
- Born: 30 December 1830 Brescia, Kingdom of Lombardy–Venetia
- Died: 29 May 1910 (aged 79) Brescia, Kingdom of Italy
- Party: Historical Right

Diogene Valotti (30 December 1830 – 29 May 1910) was an Italian politician. A prominent figure of the Historical Right in Brescia, he served as mayor of the city, president of the Province of Brescia, and senator of the Kingdom of Italy.
