= Laura Castelletti =

Italian politician

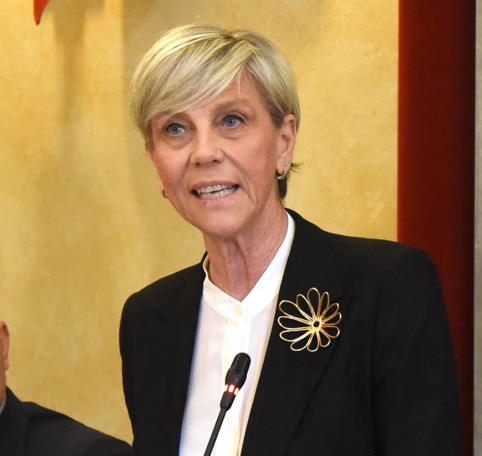

Mayor of Brescia
- Incumbent
- Assumed office 20 May 2023
- Preceded by: Emilio Del Bono

Deputy Mayor of Brescia
- In office 24 June 2013 – 20 May 2023
- Mayor: Emilio Del Bono
- Preceded by: Silvano Pedretti
- Succeeded by: Federico Manzoni

Personal details
- Born: 10 September 1962 (age 63) Brescia, Italy
- Party: Centre-left independent
- Other political affiliations: PSI (till 1994); SI (1994–1998); SDI (1998–2007); PSI (2007–2009)
- Children: 2
- Profession: Laboratory technician

Laura Castelletti (born 10 September 1962) is an Italian politician.

== Biography ==
Castelletti has been city councillor of Brescia since 1991, when she was first elected as a member of the Italian Socialist Party. Between 1998 and 2008 she served as President of the City Council of Brescia.

In 2008 she decided to run as an independent for the office of Mayor of Brescia, obtaining the 6% of the popular vote. Five years later, in 2013 she once again decided to run for the office of Mayor. After receiving again the 6% of the popular vote, on the second round she agreed to endorse the centre-left candidate Emilio Del Bono, binding her support to her appointment as deputy Mayor in case of victory.

On 24 June 2013, she was appointed for the first time deputy Mayor of Brescia, being then confirmed in such position for a second term on 26 June 2018. On 31 March 2023 she became acting Mayor once Emilio Del Bono left the office after being elected regional councillor.

In 2023 she was candidate again for the office of Mayor of Brescia, this time with the support of the centre-left coalition. She won the election on the first round on 14–15 May 2023, becoming the first woman ever to held the office. She was officially proclaimed on 20 May.

== See also ==
- 2023 Italian local elections
- List of mayors of Brescia

Political offices
Preceded by Emilio Del Bono	Mayor of Brescia since 2023	Incumbent
