= Mino Martinazzoli =

Italian politician (1931–2011)

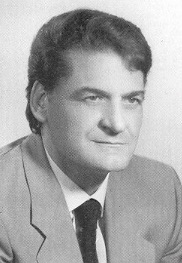

Mayor of Brescia
- In office 5 December 1994 – 14 December 1998
- Preceded by: Paolo Corsini
- Succeeded by: Paolo Corsini

Minister of Defence
- In office 22 July 1989 – 27 July 1990
- Prime Minister: Giulio Andreotti
- Preceded by: Valerio Zanone
- Succeeded by: Virginio Rognoni

Minister of Justice
- In office 4 August 1983 – 1 August 1986
- Prime Minister: Bettino Craxi
- Preceded by: Clelio Darida
- Succeeded by: Virginio Rognoni

Member of the Chamber of Deputies
- In office 12 July 1983 – 22 April 1992
- Constituency: Brescia–Bergamo

Member of the Senate of the Republic
- In office 23 April 1992 – 14 April 1994
- In office 25 May 1972 – 11 July 1983
- Constituency: Brescia

President of the Province of Brescia
- In office 10 May 1970 – 22 June 1972
- Preceded by: Ercoliano Bazoli
- Succeeded by: Tarcisio Gitti

Personal details
- Born: Fermo Martinazzoli; 30 November 1931 Orzinuovi, Italy
- Died: 4 September 2011 (aged 79) Brescia, Italy
- Party: DC (till 1994); PPI (1994–2002); UDEUR (2004–2011)
- Education: University of Pavia

Fermo "Mino" Martinazzoli (Italian pronunciation: [ˈfermo ˈmiːno martinatˈtsɔːli]; 3 November 1931 – 4 September 2011) was an Italian lawyer, politician, and former minister. He was the last secretary of the Christian Democracy (DC) party and the first secretary of the Italian People's Party (PPI) founded in 1994.

== Early life and education ==
Born in Orzinuovi, Martinazzoli studied at Collegio Borromeo in Pavia, where he received a law degree. He then became a lawyer.

== Career ==
Martinazzoli's political career began in the 1960s and 1970s, when he assumed official roles in Brescia's DC. From 1970 to 1972, he was the province of Brescia president. In 1972, he was elected in the Senate of the Republic, after which he became Minister of Justice in 1983, a position he held for three years. In 1986–1989, he was president of DC's deputies. In 1989–1990, he was Minister of Defence but resigned, together with other ministers of the DC's left-wing, after the approval of a law that strengthened Silvio Berlusconi's monopoly over private TV channels in Italy.

In 1992, when the DC party was being wiped out by the Tangentopoli bribery scandal, Martinazzoli, generally respected as an honest and competent man, was elected national secretary. Despite his efforts, the political crisis which followed the corruption scandals forced him to dissolve the DC in 1994. Martinazzoli then founded a new party, based on similar ideals, whose name recalled that of the ancestor of the DC, the Italian People's Party, which was founded in 1919 by Luigi Sturzo. In the new majoritarian system, Martinazzoli's party placed itself in the political centre between the political left, which included the heirs of the Italian Communist Party, and the political right with the new Berlusconi's Forza Italia, which had allied with the Northern Italy-based regionalist party, the Lega Nord (Northern League), as part of the Pole of Freedoms, and the post-fascist National Alliance as part of the Pole of Good Government. His will not to ally with any of them caused numerous politicians, such as Pierferdinando Casini and Clemente Mastella, to leave the PPI and form the Christian Democratic Centre (CCD), which supported Berlusconi. At the 1994 Italian general election, Martinazzoli formed a centrist alliance known as the Pact for Italy, including PPI and other democratic centrist forces. The result of the election was disappointing, with PPI obtaining 11%, some one third of the DC's consensus before its dissolution. In the same year, he accepted to run as mayor of Brescia for the new centre-left coalition, known as The Olive Tree, winning the final ballot and acting as mayor until 1998.

In 2000, Martinazzoli lost the competition with Roberto Formigoni for the president of Lombardy. After the PPI was dissolved in 2002, Martinazzoli migrated to Mastella's UDEUR in 2004, being appointed as its president, a position from which he resigned in 2005. He died on 4 September 2011, at the age of 79.

== Electoral history ==
Election	House	Constituency	Party	Votes	Result
1972	Senate of the Republic	Lombardy – Brescia	DC	84,749	Elected
1976	Senate of the Republic	Lombardy – Brescia	DC	90,708	Elected
1979	Senate of the Republic	Lombardy – Brescia	DC	90,137	Elected
1983	Chamber of Deputies	Brescia–Bergamo	DC	45,208	Elected
1987	Chamber of Deputies	Brescia–Bergamo	DC	70,895	Elected
1992	Senate of the Republic	Lombardy – Brescia	DC	66,206	Elected

== Bibliography ==
- Martinazzoli, Mino; Valle, Annachiara (2009). Uno strano democristiano (in Italian). Milan: Rizzoli. ISBN 978-88-17-03427-2. Archived from the original on 6 April 2024 – via Google Books.

Political offices
Preceded by Clelio Darida	Minister of Justice; 1983–1986	Succeeded by Virginio Rognoni
Preceded by Valerio Zanone	Minister of Defence; 1989–1990	Succeeded by Virginio Rognoni
Preceded by Antonio Maccanico	Minister of Reforms and Regions; 1991–1992	Succeeded by Raffaele Costa as Minister of Regions
Party political offices
Preceded by Arnaldo Forlani	Secretary of Christian Democracy; 1992–1994	Position abolished
New political party	Secretary of the Italian People's Party; 1994	Succeeded by Rocco Buttiglione
