= Opinion polling for the next Italian general election =

In the years running up to the next Italian general election, which will occur no later than 22 December 2027, (Note: While elections in Italy are customarily held on a Sunday or Sunday and Monday, there is no constitutional requirement to do so; the latest possible date for a general election to be held is the 70th day following the expiration of the Parliament's five-year term. See "Constitution of the Italian Republic" (PDF). Parliamentary Information, Archives and Publications Office of the Senate Service for Official Reports and Communication. Archived (PDF) from the original on 1 September 2022.) various organisations are carrying out opinion polls to gauge voting intention in Italy. (Note: The date range is from after the 2022 Italian general election, held on 25 September, to the present day as of July 2026. Poll results are reported at the dates when the fieldwork was done, as opposed to the date of publication; if such date is unknown, the date of publication is given instead.) Under the Italian par condicio (equal conditions) law, publication of opinion polls is forbidden in the last two weeks of an electoral campaign.

== Polling aggregations ==
=== Party vote aggregations ===
| Polling | | | Parties | | | | | | | | | | | | | Coalitions | |
| Polling aggregator | Ref. | Date updated | FdI | PD | M5S | Lega | FI | A | IV | AVS | +E | NM | FN | Others | Lead | CSX | CDX |
|---|---|---|---|---|---|---|---|---|---|---|---|---|---|---|---|---|---|
| Youtrend | | 19 Nov 2026 | 27.8 | 20.5 | 12.8 | 5.6 | 7.1 | 3.2 | 2.4 | 6.2 | 1.2 | 1.0 | 6.5 | 5.7 1.0 – South calls North; 4.7 – Others | 7.3 | 44.7 | 42.5 |
| Doppia Cifra | | 18 Nov 2026 | 27.4 | 20.7 | 12.5 | 5.7 | 7.4 | 3.0 | 2.4 | 6.4 | 1.3 | 1.1 | 6.4 | 5.0 1.2 – South calls North; 1.0 – Liberal Democratic Party; 1.0 – Italian Socialist Party; 1.0 – Civic Project Italy; 0.8 – Ora! | 6.7 | 43.2 | 42.7 |
| PolitPro | | 18 Nov 2026 | 27.5 | 20.5 | 12.7 | 5.7 | 7.2 | 3.1 | 2.4 | 6.2 | 1.3 | 1.2 | 6.7 | 5.5 1.2 – South calls North; 4.3 – Others | 7.0 | 43.1 | 42.8 |
| BiDiMedia | | 17 Nov 2026 | 27.6 | 20.3 | 12.8 | 5.9 | 7.2 | 3.0 | 2.2 | 6.2 | 1.2 | 1.1 | 6.5 | 6.0 1.0 – South calls North; 0.9 – Civic Project Italy – ControCorrente – Italian Socialist Party; 0.7 – Liberal Democratic Party; 3.4 – Others | 7.2 | 43.6 | 42.8 |
| Cassandra | | 16 Nov 2026 | 28.2 | 20.6 | 12.4 | 5.6 | 7.2 | 2.9 | 2.1 | 6.0 | 1.4 | 1.0 | 6.1 | 6.5 1.5 – Liberal Democratic Party; 1.2 – South calls North; 1.0 – Ora! 2.8 – Others | 7.6 | 42.5 | 43.2 |
| Politico Europe | | 16 Nov 2026 | 28.0 | 21.0 | 13.0 | 6.0 | 7.0 | 3.0 | 3.0 | 6.0 | 1.0 | – | 6.0 | 1.0 1.0 – South calls North | 7.0 | 44.0 | 42.0 |
| Europe Elects | | 11 Nov 2026 | 27.9 | 20.3 | 12.8 | 5.5 | 7.1 | 3.0 | 2.4 | 6.3 | 1.4 | 1.0 | 6.3 | 6.0 1.5 – Civic Project Italy – Italian Socialist Party; 1.3 – South calls North; 0.9 – Ora! 0.7 – Liberal Democratic Party; 1.6 – Others | 7.6 | 44.7 | 42.8 |
| Atlante elettorale | | 16 Sep 2026 | 26.3 | 21.1 | 12.5 | 5.7 | 7.5 | 3.8 | 4.3 | 6.6 | – | 1.2 | 7.6 | 3.4 | 5.2 | 44.5 | 40.7 |
| 2022 election | | 25 Sep 2022 | 26.0 | 19.1 | 15.4 | 8.8 | 8.1 | 7.8 (Note: As Action – Italia Viva) | | 3.6 | 2.8 | 0.9 | – | 4.9 | 6.9 | 26.1 (Note: The 2022 centre-left coalition was composed of the Democratic Party, Greens and Left Alliance, More Europe, and Civic Commitment.) | 43.8 (Note: The 2022 centre-right coalition was composed of Brothers of Italy, the League, Forza Italia, and Us Moderates.) |

=== Party seats aggregations ===
==== Chamber of Deputies ====
| Polling | | | Parties | | | | | | | | | | | | | Coalitions | | |
| Polling aggregator | Ref. | Date updated | FdI | PD | M5S | Lega | FI | A | IV | AVS | +E | NM | ScN | FN | Others | CSX | CDX | Majority |
|---|---|---|---|---|---|---|---|---|---|---|---|---|---|---|---|---|---|---|
| Cassandra | | 18 Nov 2026 | 148 | 75 | 44 | 29 | 37 | 0 | 7 | 21 | 0 | 0 | 6 | 22 | 11 3 – South Tyrol People's Party; 8 – Others | 147 | 220 | 20 |
| Doppia Cifra | | 18 Nov 2026 | 93 | 70 | 43 | 19 | 25 | 10 | 8 | 21 | 0 | 0 | 4 | 21 | 86 70 – Majority jackpot for CSX; 14 – Others | 212 | 141 | 11 |
| Atlante elettorale | | 8 Sep 2026 | 90 | 73 | 42 | 21 | 25 | 11 | 9 | 22 | 0 | 4 | – | 25 | 78 70 – Majority jackpot for CSX; 8 – Others | 220 | 143 | 19 |
| 2022 election | | 25 Sep 2022 | 119 | 69 | 52 | 66 | 45 | 21 | | 12 | 2 | 7 | 1 | —N/a | 5 3 – SVP–PATT; 1 – Aosta Valley; 1 – Associative Movement of Italians Abroad | 84 | 237 | 36 |

==== Senate of the Republic ====
| Polling | | | Parties | | | | | | | | | | | | | Coalitions | | |
| Polling aggregator | Ref. | Date updated | FdI | PD | M5S | Lega | FI | A | IV | AVS | +E | NM | ScN | FN | Others | CSX | CDX | Majority |
|---|---|---|---|---|---|---|---|---|---|---|---|---|---|---|---|---|---|---|
| Cassandra | | 18 Nov 2026 | 76 | 39 | 25 | 12 | 20 | 0 | 0 | 11 | 0 | 0 | 1 | 10 | 11 5 – Senators for life 4 – Overseas constituency 2 – South Tyrol People's Party; 8 – Others | 72 | 109 | 3 |
| Doppia Cifra | | 18 Nov 2026 | 48 | 36 | 23 | 8 | 14 | 3 | 3 | 10 | 0 | 0 | 1 | 8 | 46 35 – Majority jackpot for CSX; 11 – Others | 107 | 71 | 6 |
| 2022 election | | 25 Sep 2022 | 65 | 39 | 20 | 29 | 18 | 9 | | 3 | 0 | 1 | 1 | —N/a | 6 3 – Senators for life 2 – SVP–PATT; 1 – Associative Movement of Italians Abroad | 44 | 115 | 12 |

=== Government approval rating aggregations ===
| Polling aggregator | Ref. | Date updated | Approve | Disapprove | Lead |
|---|---|---|---|---|---|
| Doppia Cifra | | 18 Nov 2026 | 38.1 | 56.7 | 18.6 |
| Cassandra | | 5 Nov 2026 | 39.2 | 60.8 | 21.6 |

=== Giorgia Meloni approval rating aggregations ===
| Polling aggregator | Ref. | Date updated | Approve | Disapprove | Lead |
|---|---|---|---|---|---|
| BiDiMedia | | 4 Nov 2026 | 39.0 | 61.0 | 22.0 |

=== Party leaders approval rating aggregations ===
| Polling aggregator | Ref. | Date updated | | | | | | | | | | | | | Lead |
| Polling aggregator | Ref. | Date updated | Meloni | Schlein | Conte | Salvini | Tajani | Calenda | Renzi | Bonelli | Fratoianni | Lupi | Marattin | Vannacci | Lead |
|---|---|---|---|---|---|---|---|---|---|---|---|---|---|---|---|
| Doppia Cifra | | 18 Nov 2026 | 38.1 | 26.4 | 30.3 | 22.0 | 29.5 | 20.3 | 16.4 | 16.8 | 17.7 | 18.6 | 22.8 | 20.6 | 7.8 |

== Party vote ==
=== 2026 ===
| Polling | | | Parties | | | | | | | | | | | | | | | Coalitions | |
| Fieldwork date | Polling firm | Sample size | FdI | PD | M5S | Lega (Note: Some polls refer to it as League Federal Italy.) | FI | A | IV (Note: Some polls refer to it as either Reformist House – Italia Viva or Reformist House.) | AVS | +E | NM | ScN (Note: Some polls refer to it as South calls North – Mayors of Italy.) | PLD | FN | Others | Lead | CSX | CDX |
|---|---|---|---|---|---|---|---|---|---|---|---|---|---|---|---|---|---|---|---|
| 18–19 Nov | Termometro Politico | 3,400 | 27.9 | 20.5 | 12.8 | 5.5 | 7.3 | 2.9 | 2.5 | 6.4 | 1.4 | 1.0 | | | 6.7 | 5.1 | 7.4 | 43.6 | 41.7 |
| 17–18 Nov | Eumetra | 800 | 27.9 | 20.8 | 12.0 | 5.9 | 7.3 | 3.0 | 2.4 | 6.3 | 1.4 | 1.0 | 1.0 | | 6.1 | 4.9 1.6 – Other parties of the centre-left coalition 3.3 – Others | 7.1 | 44.5 | 43.1 |
| 16–17 Nov | EMG | 1,000 | 26.2 | 20.6 | 12.0 | 7.1 | 7.4 | 3.0 (Note: As Action – Centre) | 2.8 | 5.5 | 1.3 | 1.7 | 1.1 | 1.5 | 5.2 | 4.6 1.1 – Other parties of the centre-left coalition 0.7 – Union of the Centre; 0.5 – Ora! 2.3 – Others | 5.6 | 43.3 | 44.2 |
| 10–17 Nov | Lab21 | 1,006 | 28.1 | 20.1 | 13.0 | 5.7 | 6.6 | 4.2 | 2.5 | 5.8 | 1.2 | 0.9 | 1.6 | 1.1 | 6.6 | 2.6 1.3 – Civic Project Italy; 1.3 – Others | 8.0 | 43.9 | 44.0 |
| 16 Nov | Piepoli | 500 | 28.0 | 20.5 | 12.5 | 5.5 | 7.0 | 3.0 | 3.0 | 6.0 | 1.0 | 1.5 | 1.5 | 1.5 | 6.5 | 2.5 | 7.5 | 43.0 | 43.5 |
| 15–16 Nov | Abruzzo – 01 by-election (CSX gain) | | | | | | | | | | | | | | | | | | |
| 14–16 Nov | Quorum | 810 | 27.2 | 20.6 | 13.7 | 5.3 | 6.6 | 3.3 | 2.8 | 6.4 | | | | | 6.6 | 7.5 1.7 – Other parties of the centre-right coalition 1.5 – Other parties of the centre-left coalition | 6.6 | 45.0 | 40.8 |
| 11–16 Nov | SWG | 1,200 | 28.6 | 20.7 | 12.5 | 5.7 | 7.1 | 3.1 (Note: Action with Public Space) | 2.4 | 6.2 | 1.3 | 1.1 | 1.1 | | 5.8 | 4.4 1.8 – Other parties of the centre-left coalition 2.6 – Others | 7.9 | 44.9 | 43.6 |
| 9–13 Nov | Sigma Piave | 800 | 26.6 | 20.4 | 14.4 | 6.6 | 7.1 | 2.9 | 2.4 | 5.3 | 1.6 | 0.8 | | | 6.7 | 5.2 | 6.2 | 44.1 | 41.1 |
| 11–12 Nov | Termometro Politico | 3,100 | 27.9 | 20.6 | 12.6 | 5.7 | 7.2 | 3.0 | 2.4 | 6.2 | 1.5 | 1.1 | | | 6.9 | 4.9 | 7.3 | 43.3 | 41.9 |
| 11 Nov | Only Numbers | 800 | 28.2 | 20.4 | 11.6 | 6.0 | 7.6 | 3.3 | 2.2 | 6.0 | 1.1 | 1.1 | 0.8 | | 6.5 | 5.2 2.2 – Schierarsi; 1.1 – Civic Project Italy; 0.5 – Plus One; 1.4 – Others | 7.8 | 42.9 | 43.7 |
| 10–11 Nov | Eumetra | 800 | 28.2 | 20.6 | 12.1 | 6.2 | 7.2 | 3.2 | 2.5 | 6.1 | 1.3 | 1.2 | 1.2 | | 6.1 | 3.8 1.5 – Other parties of the centre-left coalition 2.6 – Others | 7.6 | 44.1 | 44.0 |
| 10–11 Nov | BiDiMedia | 1,000 | 26.3 | 20.5 | 12.0 | 5.6 | 7.3 | 2.8 | 2.0 | 6.5 | 0.9 | 1.1 | 1.4 | 0.8 | 6.0 | 6.8 2.0 – Civic Project Italy + Avanti – PSI; 0.8 – Communist Refoundation Party; 0.7 – Ora! 0.7 – Italy Tomorrow; 0.5 – Union of the Centre; 0.5 – Power to the People! 1.6 – Others | 5.8 | 43.9 | 42.2 |
| 7–9 Nov | Quorum | 810 | 27.4 | 20.3 | 13.2 | 5.5 | 6.7 | 3.6 | 2.9 | 6.3 | | | | | 7.2 | 6.8 1.5 – Other parties of the centre-right coalition 1.3 – Other parties of the centre-left coalition 1.0 – Ora! 3.0 – Others | 7.1 | 44.0 | 41.2 |
| 4–9 Nov | SWG | 1,200 | 28.9 | 20.8 | 12.6 | 5.7 | 7.3 | 3.2 | 2.2 | 6.2 | 1.2 | 1.0 | 1.1 | | 5.5 | 4.3 1.9 – Other parties of the centre-left coalition 2.4 – Others | 8.1 | 44.9 | 44.0 |
| 2–9 Nov | Ixè | 1,000 | 26.5 | 20.9 | 13.9 | 5.1 | 7.5 | 2.6 | 2.0 | 6.3 | | | | | 7.2 | 8.0 1.7 – Other parties of the centre-right coalition 1.4 – Other parties of the centre-left coalition 4.9 – Others | 5.6 | 44.5 | 40.8 |
| 1–7 Nov | Lab21 | 1,402 | 28.1 | 20.3 | 13.0 | 5.6 | 6.8 | 3.1 | 2.4 | 5.8 | 1.2 | 0.9 | 1.6 | 1.0 | 6.8 | 3.4 1.2 – Civic Project Italy; 2.2 – Others | 7.8 | 43.9 | 44.0 |
| 4–5 Nov | Only Numbers | 800 | 27.6 | 20.4 | 12.0 | 6.1 | 7.5 | 3.0 | 2.2 | 6.2 | 1.2 | 1.0 | 0.8 | | 6.5 | 5.5 1.2 – Civic Project Italy; 0.5 – Plus One; 3.8 – Others | 7.2 | 43.7 | 43.0 |
| 4–5 Nov | Termometro Politico | 2,400 | 28.1 | 20.7 | 12.6 | 5.5 | 7.4 | 2.8 | 2.5 | 6.5 | 1.6 | 1.0 | | | 6.8 | 4.5 | 7.4 | 43.9 | 42.0 |
| 3–4 Nov | Eumetra | 800 | 27.9 | 20.5 | 12.0 | 6.1 | 7.2 | 3.2 | 2.4 | 6.2 | 1.5 | 1.1 | 1.1 | | 6.4 | 4.1 1.6 – Other parties of the centre-left coalition 2.8 – Others | 7.4 | 44.2 | 43.4 |
| 2–3 Nov | EMG | 1,000 | 26.3 | 20.2 | 12.1 | 7.4 | 7.3 | 2.9 | 2.6 | 5.9 | 1.6 | 1.7 | 1.4 | 1.8 | 5.1 | 3.7 1.2 – Civic Project Italy + Avanti – PSI; 0.5 – Ora! 2.0 – Others | 6.1 | 43.6 | 44.1 |
| 2 Nov | Pieopoli | 500 | 28.0 | 20.0 | 13.0 | 5.5 | 7.5 | 3.0 | 2.5 | 6.0 | 1.5 | 1.5 | 1.5 | 1.5 | 6.5 | 2.0 | 8.0 | 43.0 | 44.0 |
| 28 Oct – 2 Nov | SWG | 1,200 | 29.0 | 20.6 | 12.6 | 5.5 | 7.2 | 3.1 | 2.2 | 6.2 | 1.3 | 1.1 | 1.0 | | 5.8 | 4.4 2.1 – Other parties of the centre-left coalition 2.3 – Others | 8.4 | 45.0 | 43.8 |
| 31 Oct | The Democratic Party, Five Star Movement, Greens and Left Alliance, Italia Viva, More Europe, Civic Project Italy, and Plus One reach an agreement to form the new centre-left coalition | | | | | | | | | | | | | | | | | | |
| 26–31 Oct | Lab21 | 1,000 | 28.0 | 20.1 | 12.9 | 5.6 | 6.8 | 3.1 | 2.5 | 5.7 | 1.1 | 0.9 | 1.6 | 1.0 | 7.0 | 3.7 1.2 – Civic Project Italy; 2.5 – Others | 7.9 | 43.5 | 43.9 |
| 27–30 Oct | BiDiMedia | 1,000 | 26.6 | 20.6 | 12.0 | 5.4 | 7.2 | 3.0 | 1.9 | 6.7 | 0.8 | 1.0 | 1.3 | 0.7 | 6.7 | 6.1 1.0 – Avanti – PSI; 1.0 – Civic Project Italy; 0.8 – Power to the People! 0.7 – Ora! 0.7 – Communist Refoundation Party; 0.5 – Union of the Centre; 1.4 – Others | 6.0 | 44.0 | 42.0 |
| 28–29 Oct | Termometro Politico | 2,700 | 28.1 | 20.8 | 12.5 | 5.6 | 7.5 | 2.9 | 2.4 | 6.3 | 1.6 | 1.0 | | | 7.1 | 4.2 | 7.3 | 43.6 | 42.1 |
| 26–29 Oct | Ipsos | 1,000 | 26.7 | 19.9 | 14.9 | 5.6 | 6.3 | 3.0 | 2.0 | 6.3 | 1.8 | 0.8 | | | 7.9 | 4.8 | 6.8 | 44.9 | 39.4 |
| 27–28 Oct | Quorum | 810 | 28.1 | 19.9 | 13.5 | 5.0 | 7.0 | 3.4 | 2.7 | 6.4 | | 1.0 | 0.8 | | 7.0 | 5.2 1.5 – Other parties of the centre-left coalition 1.2 – Ora! 2.5 – Others | 8.2 | 44.0 | 41.9 |
| 27–28 Oct | Eumetra | 800 | 28.1 | 20.3 | 12.1 | 5.8 | 7.4 | 3.2 | 2.3 | 6.4 | 1.7 | 1.0 | 1.0 | | 6.5 | 4.2 0.7 – Other parties of the centre-left coalition 3.5 – Others | 7.8 | 43.5 | 43.3 |
| 21–26 Oct | SWG | 1,200 | 29.3 | 20.6 | 12.4 | 5.4 | 7.4 | 3.1 | 2.3 | 6.3 | 1.4 | 1.0 | 1.0 | | 5.6 | 4.2 1.0 – Avanti – PSI; 0.9 – Other parties of the centre-left coalition 2.3 – Others | 8.7 | 44.9 | 44.1 |
| 14–26 Oct | Ipsos | 1,300 | 27.4 | 19.7 | 14.8 | 5.9 | 6.1 | 2.7 | 1.3 | 6.2 | 1.3 | 0.9 | 0.8 | 0.5 | 8.1 | 4.3 0.8 – Power to the People! 0.6 – Plus One; 0.5 – Civic Project Italy; 0.4 – Ora! 0.3 – Primavera; 0.3 – Avanti – PSI1.5 – Others | 7.7 | 45.0 | 41.1 |
| 16–22 Oct | Excellera Advisory Group | 1,006 | 26.3 | 20.0 | 14.5 | 5.6 | 7.9 | 3.1 | 2.5 | 6.6 | 1.6 | 0.7 | | | 7.7 | 3.5 | 6.3 | 45.2 | 40.5 |
| 21–22 Oct | Only Numbers | 800 | 28.0 | 20.0 | 11.4 | 6.4 | 7.5 | 3.1 | 2.4 | 6.5 | 1.6 | 1.0 | 0.8 | | 6.8 | 4.5 0.9 – Civic Project Italy; 0.6 – Plus One; 3.0 – Others | 8.0 | 43.4 | 43.7 |
| 20–22 Oct | Termometro Politico | 2,400 | 27.8 | 20.6 | 12.7 | 5.4 | 7.3 | 2.8 | 2.5 | 6.4 | 1.6 | 1.0 | | | 7.5 | 4.4 | 7.2 | 43.8 | 41.7 |
| 5–22 Oct | Lab21 | 5,406 | 28.4 | 20.0 | 13.2 | 5.7 | 6.8 | 3.0 | 2.6 | 5.6 | 1.0 | 0.9 | 1.7 | | 7.9 | 3.2 1.2 – Civic Project Italy; 2.0 – Others | 8.4 | 43.6 | 43.5 |
| 20–21 Oct | Eumetra | 800 | 27.7 | 20.1 | 12.4 | 5.6 | 7.3 | 3.2 | 2.4 | 6.4 | 1.7 | 1.1 | 1.1 | | 7.1 | 3.9 | 7.6 | 43.0 | 42.8 |
| 19–20 Oct | EMG | 1,000 | 26.0 | 20.5 | 11.6 | 7.3 | 7.5 | 2.7 | 2.6 | 5.6 | 1.8 | 1.7 | 1.5 | 1.8 | 5.6 | 3.8 1.0 – Civic Project Italy + Avanti – PSI; 0.7 – Ora! 2.1 – Others | 5.5 | 43.1 | 44.0 |
| 19 Oct | Pieopoli | 500 | 28.0 | 20.5 | 13.0 | 5.0 | 7.0 | 3.0 | 2.5 | 6.5 | 1.5 | 1.5 | 1.5 | 1.5 | 6.5 | 2.0 | 7.5 | 44.0 | 43.0 |
| 17–19 Oct | BiDiMedia | 1,000 | 26.5 | 20.5 | 12.0 | 5.4 | 6.7 | 3.0 | 2.0 | 6.6 | 1.1 | 1.0 | 1.4 | 0.8 | 7.2 | 5.8 1.0 – Civic Project Italy; 0.8 – Power to the People! 0.8 – Communist Refoundation Party; 0.7 – Ora! 0.6 – Avanti – PSI; 0.5 – Union of the Centre; 1.4 – Others | 6.0 | 44.6 | 41.5 |
| 14–19 Oct | SWG | 1,200 | 28.1 | 20.7 | 12.7 | 5.2 | 7.1 | 3.1 | 2.4 | 6.4 | 1.4 | 1.0 | 1.0 | 1.2 (Note: The Liberal Democratic Party and Ora!) | 7.2 | 2.5 1.5 – Civic Project Italy, Avanti – PSI and Plus One; 1.0 – Others | 7.4 | 45.1 | 42.4 |
| 14–15 Oct | Only Numbers | 800 | 27.8 | 20.0 | 11.1 | 6.0 | 7.7 | 3.3 | 2.3 | 6.6 | 1.4 | 1.0 | 0.6 | | 6.8 | 5.4 1.3 – Civic Project Italy; 0.7 – Plus One; 3.4 – Others | 7.8 | 43.4 | 43.1 |
| 13–15 Oct | Termometro Politico | 2,400 | 27.5 | 21.1 | 12.5 | 5.3 | 7.5 | 3.0 | 2.4 | 6.3 | 1.8 | 1.1 | | | 7.3 | 4.2 | 6.4 | 44.1 | 41.4 |
| 13–14 Oct | Eumetra | 800 | 27.5 | 20.1 | 12.7 | 5.8 | 7.3 | 3.3 | 2.3 | 6.5 | 1.7 | 1.1 | 1.0 | | 7.3 | 3.4 | 7.4 | 43.3 | 42.7 |
| 12–14 Oct | Piepoli | 500 | 28.0 | 20.0 | 12.5 | 5.0 | 7.5 | 3.0 | 2.5 | 6.5 | 1.5 | 1.5 | 1.5 | 1.5 | 7.0 | 2.0 | 8.0 | 43.0 | 43.5 |
| 7–12 Oct | SWG | 1,200 | 27.7 | 20.4 | 12.7 | 5.4 | 7.3 | 3.2 | 2.3 | 6.6 | 1.7 | 1.0 | 1.0 | | 7.6 | 3.1 | 7.3 | 43.7 | 42.4 |
| 10 Oct | South calls North joins the centre-right coalition | | | | | | | | | | | | | | | | | | |

| Polling | | | Parties | | | | | | | | | | | | | | | Coalitions | |
| Fieldwork date | Polling firm | Sample size | FdI | PD | M5S | Lega | FI | A | IV | AVS | +E | NM | DSP | PLD | FN | Others | Lead | CSX | CDX |
|---|---|---|---|---|---|---|---|---|---|---|---|---|---|---|---|---|---|---|---|
| 9 Oct | Lab21 | 754 | 28.4 | 20.0 | 13.4 | 5.5 | 7.0 | 2.9 | 2.9 | 5.6 | 1.2 | 0.8 | | | 8.2 | 4.1 1.6 – South calls North; 2.5 – Others | 8.4 | 43.1 | 43.3 |
| 7–8 Oct | Only Numbers | 800 | 27.5 | 19.5 | 11.7 | 6.3 | 7.5 | 3.3 | 2.3 | 6.8 | 2.0 | 1.1 | | | 7.0 | 5.0 0.3 – Civic Project Italy; 4.7 – Others | 8.0 | 42.6 | 42.4 |
| 7–8 Oct | Termometro Politico | 2,500 | 27.8 | 21.1 | 12.7 | 5.3 | 7.3 | 2.8 | 2.5 | 6.2 | 1.6 | 1.0 | | | 7.4 | 4.3 | 6.7 | 44.1 | 41.4 |
| 7–8 Oct | Eumetra | 800 | 27.5 | 20.3 | 12.6 | 5.7 | 7.4 | 3.2 | 2.2 | 6.5 | 1.8 | 1.1 | | | 7.6 | 4.1 | 7.2 | 43.4 | 41.7 |
| 5–8 Oct | Sigma Piave | 800 | 26.6 | 21.0 | 12.6 | 5.6 | 7.3 | 3.4 | 2.5 | 6.4 | 1.5 | 1.1 | | | 7.7 | 4.3 | 7.3 | 44.0 | 40.6 |
| 6 Oct | Noto | | 28.0 | 19.5 | 12.5 | 6.0 | 6.9 | 4.0 (Note: Action with the Liberal Democratic Party and Public Space) | 2.5 (Note: Italia Viva with More Europe) | 6.5 | w. IV | 1.4 | | w. A | 6.7 | 6.0 1.5 – Civic Project Italy + Avanti – PSI; 1.1 – South calls North + Civics; 0.3 – Plus One; 3.1 – Others | 8.5 | 42.8 | 43.4 |
| 5–6 Oct | EMG | 1,000 | 25.4 | 20.6 | 11.8 | 7.5 | 7.9 | 2.6 | 2.5 | 5.8 | 1.8 | 1.7 | | 1.7 | 6.5 | 4.2 | 4.8 | 42.5 | 42.5 |
| 5–6 Oct | Quorum | 805 | 27.0 | 20.4 | 13.5 | 4.8 | 7.4 | 3.3 | 2.5 | 5.8 | 1.5 | 1.0 | | 1.1 | 7.8 | 3.9 1.2 – Ora! 2.7 – Others | 6.6 | 43.7 | 40.2 |
| 5 Oct | Piepoli | 500 | 27.5 | 20.0 | 12.5 | 5.5 | 7.5 | 3.0 | 2.5 | 7.0 | 1.5 | 1.5 | | 1.5 | 7.0 | 3.0 1.5 – South calls North; 0.5 – Ora! 1.0 – Others | 7.5 | 43.5 | 43.5 |
| 30 Sep – 5 Oct | SWG | 1,200 | 27.7 | 20.7 | 12.6 | 5.2 | 7.1 | 3.1 | 2.3 | 6.6 | 1.6 | 1.0 | | | 7.8 | 3.3 1.0 – Avanti – PSI; 2.3 – Others | 7.0 | 44.8 | 41.0 |
| 3 Oct | Former Sovereign Popular Democracy leader Marco Rizzo founds Italy Tomorrow | | | | | | | | | | | | | | | | | | |
| 30 Sep – 1 Oct | Only Numbers | 800 | 27.3 | 19.7 | 11.6 | 6.6 | 7.5 | 3.2 | 2.3 | 6.7 | 1.8 | 1.0 | | | 7.0 | 5.3 | 7.6 | 42.1 | 42.4 |
| 30 Sep – 1 Oct | Termometro Politico | 2,300 | 27.5 | 21.1 | 12.9 | 5.2 | 7.3 | 2.9 | 2.4 | 6.3 | 1.7 | 1.1 | | | 7.3 | 4.3 | 6.4 | 44.4 | 41.1 |
| 29–30 Sep | Eumetra | 800 | 27.1 | 20.5 | 12.8 | 5.5 | 7.4 | 3.2 | 2.2 | 6.4 | 1.7 | 1.0 | | | 8.0 | 4.2 | 6.6 | 43.6 | 41.0 |
| 28 Sep | Only Numbers | 1,000 | 27.5 | 20.0 | 11.6 | 6.5 | 7.8 | 3.3 | 2.2 | 6.5 | 1.4 | 1.0 | | | 7.0 | 5.2 | 7.5 | 41.7 | 42.8 |
| 27–28 Sep | Calabria – 05 by-election (CDX hold) | | | | | | | | | | | | | | | | | | |
| 23–28 Sep | SWG | 1,200 | 27.4 | 20.6 | 12.8 | 5.1 | 6.9 | 3.2 | 2.4 | 6.6 | 1.7 | 1.0 | | | 8.0 | 3.3 1.0 – Avanti – PSI; 2.3 – Others | 6.8 | 45.1 | 40.4 |
| 23–24 Sep | Only Numbers | 800 | 27.5 | 20.0 | 11.8 | 6.5 | 7.8 | 3.2 | 2.1 | 6.5 | 2.3 | 1.0 | | | 7.0 | 4.5 0.2 – Civic Project Italy; 4.3 – Others | 7.5 | 42.9 | 42.8 |
| 23–24 Sep | Termometro Politico | 2,500 | 27.3 | 21.4 | 12.7 | 5.5 | 7.3 | 3.0 | 2.4 | 6.1 | 1.6 | 1.1 | | | 7.3 | 4.3 | 5.9 | 44.2 | 41.2 |
| 21–24 Sep | Ipsos | 1,000 | 26.4 | 19.5 | 14.5 | 4.7 | 7.3 | 3.0 | 2.1 | 6.3 | 2.1 | 1.0 | | | 8.8 | 4.3 | 6.9 | 44.5 | 39.4 |
| 21–24 Sep | Cluster 17 | 1,580 | 25.9 | 19.1 | 13.6 | 4.5 | 7.0 | 4.5 | 2.0 | 7.5 | 2.0 | 1.3 | | | 9.2 | 3.4 | 6.8 | 44.2 | 38.7 |
| 22–23 Sep | Eumetra | 800 | 26.7 | 21.1 | 12.5 | 5.5 | 7.4 | 3.2 | 2.3 | 6.5 | 1.5 | 1.0 | | | 7.9 | 4.4 | 5.6 | 43.9 | 40.6 |
| 21–22 Sep | EMG | 1,000 | 25.1 | 21.2 | 12.1 | 7.7 | 8.0 | 2.6 | 2.5 | 6.0 | 2.0 | 1.7 | | 1.6 | 6.7 | 2.8 | 3.9 | 43.8 | 42.5 |
| 18–22 Sep | Quorum | 810 | 26.5 | 21.1 | 13.2 | 5.1 | 7.3 | 3.4 | 2.2 | 5.9 | 1.6 | 1.0 | | 1.1 | 8.1 | 3.4 1.1 – Ora! 2.3 – Others | 5.4 | 44.0 | 39.9 |
| 12–21 Sep | SWG | 1,200 | 27.1 | 20.8 | 12.8 | 5.3 | 7.0 | 3.1 | 2.4 | 6.5 | 1.5 | 1.0 | | | 8.0 | 3.5 1.0 – Avanti – PSI; 2.5 – Others | 6.3 | 45.0 | 40.4 |
| 14–18 Sep | Sigma Piave | 800 | 25.8 | 20.9 | 12.7 | 5.9 | 7.3 | 3.8 | 2.5 | 6.1 | 1.5 | 1.1 | | | 8.1 | 4.3 | 4.9 | 43.7 | 40.1 |
| 16–17 Sep | Termometro Politico | 2,400 | 27.1 | 21.4 | 12.4 | 5.3 | 7.6 | 2.8 | 2.4 | 6.2 | 1.7 | 1.1 | | | 7.3 | 4.7 | 5.7 | 44.1 | 41.1 |
| 16–17 Sep | Only Numbers | 800 | 27.3 | 20.1 | 11.5 | 6.8 | 7.8 | 3.4 | 2.1 | 6.7 | 2.0 | 1.0 | | | 7.4 | 3.9 0.8 – Civic Project Italy; 3.1 – Others | 7.2 | 43.2 | 42.9 |
| 15–16 Sep | Eumetra | 800 | 26.5 | 21.0 | 12.2 | 5.8 | 7.3 | 3.3 | 2.4 | 6.3 | 1.3 | 1.1 | | | 7.7 | 5.1 | 5.5 | 43.2 | 40.7 |
| 15 Sep | Tecnè | 804 | 27.9 | 20.8 | 12.4 | 5.5 | 7.9 | 3.2 | 2.1 | 6.1 | 1.4 | 1.1 | | | 7.4 | 4.2 | 7.1 | 42.8 | 42.4 |
| 14 Sep | Only Numbers | 1,000 | 26.3 | 20.7 | 11.9 | 6.3 | 7.5 | 3.3 | 2.1 | 6.5 | 2.0 | 1.0 | | | 7.4 | 5.0 | 5.6 | 43.2 | 41.1 |
| 9–14 Sep | SWG | 1,200 | 27.0 | 20.9 | 12.6 | 5.5 | 6.9 | 3.1 | 2.5 | 6.7 | 1.3 | 1.0 | | | 7.9 | 4.6 1.0 – South Calls North; 3.6 – Others | 6.1 | 44.0 | 40.4 |
| 9–10 Sep | Only Numbers | 800 | 26.8 | 20.8 | 11.3 | 6.5 | 7.6 | 3.4 | 2.2 | 6.7 | 2.0 | 1.0 | | | 7.3 | 4.4 | 6.0 | 43.0 | 41.9 |
| 8–10 Sep | Termometro Politico | 2,600 | 27.0 | 21.4 | 12.6 | 5.4 | 7.5 | 2.9 | 2.5 | 6.2 | 1.7 | 1.1 | | | 7.3 | 4.4 | 5.6 | 44.4 | 41.0 |
| 3–10 Sep | Ixè | 1,000 | 26.1 | 22.0 | 13.6 | 4.6 | 7.6 | 3.0 | 2.4 | 7.3 | 1.6 | 1.0 | | | 8.1 | 2.7 | 4.1 | 46.9 | 39.3 |
| 2–10 Sep | Winpoll | 1,500 | 25.5 | 22.3 | 11.2 | 5.4 | 7.6 | 2.3 | 2.8 | 7.3 | 1.3 | | | | 7.6 | 6.7 1.5 – Power to the People! 5.2 – Others | 3.2 | 44.9 | 38.5 |
| 9 Sep | Tecnè | 801 | 28.0 | 20.7 | 12.5 | 5.6 | 7.9 | 3.3 | 2.3 | 6.0 | 1.1 | 1.0 | | | 7.3 | 4.3 | 7.3 | 42.6 | 42.5 |
| 7–8 Sep | EMG | 1,000 | 25.0 | 21.5 | 12.0 | 7.5 | 8.2 | 2.6 | 2.5 | 6.0 | 1.6 | 1.6 | | 1.6 | 7.2 | 2.7 | 3.5 | 43.6 | 42.3 |
| 7 Sep | Piepoli | 500 | 28.0 | 20.0 | 12.5 | 5.5 | 7.5 | 3.0 | 2.0 | 7.0 | 1.5 | 1.5 | | 1.5 | 7.5 | 2.5 1.5 – South calls North; 0.5 – Ora! 0.5 – Others | 8.0 | 43.0 | 42.5 |
| 2–7 Sep | SWG | 1,200 | 26.8 | 20.6 | 12.5 | 5.7 | 6.9 | 3.2 | 2.5 | 6.8 | 1.4 | 1.0 | | | 7.7 | 3.9 1.0 – South Calls North; 2.9 – Others | 6.2 | 43.8 | 40.4 |
| 4–6 Sep | BiDiMedia | 1,000 | 25.4 | 21.2 | 12.3 | 5.0 | 7.2 | 2.8 | 1.9 | 6.7 | 1.2 | 1.0 | | 0.9 | 7.8 | 6.5 1.2 – South calls North; 1.0 – Civic Project Italy; 0.9 – Power to the People! 0.8 – Ora! 0.6 – Avanti – PSI; 0.6 – Communist Refoundation Party; 0.5 – Union of the Centre; 0.9 – Others | 4.2 | 44.9 | 39.1 |
| 2–3 Sep | Only Numbers | 800 | 26.5 | 21.3 | 11.0 | 6.8 | 7.8 | 3.3 | 2.6 | 6.8 | 1.4 | 1.0 | | | 7.2 | 4.3 | 5.2 | 43.1 | 42.1 |
| 2–3 Sep | Termometro Politico | 2,200 | 27.4 | 21.7 | 12.9 | 5.6 | 7.4 | 3.0 | 2.4 | 6.1 | 1.7 | 1.1 | | | 6.9 | 3.8 | 5.7 | 44.8 | 41.5 |
| 31 Aug – 3 Sep | Quorum | 800 | 26.5 | 22.2 | 12.6 | 4.4 | 7.1 | 3.9 | 2.4 | 5.8 | 1.6 | 0.9 | | 1.3 | 7.9 | 2.3 1.1 – Ora! 1.2 – Others | 4.3 | 44.6 | 38.9 |
| 31 Aug – 1 Sep | EMG | 1,000 | 25.0 | 21.3 | 12.5 | 7.4 | 8.1 | 2.5 | 2.6 | 6.0 | 1.4 | 1.6 | | 1.5 | 6.8 | 3.3 | 3.7 | 43.8 | 42.1 |
| 26–31 Aug | SWG | 1,200 | 26.8 | 20.7 | 12.7 | 5.7 | 7.1 | 3.2 | 2.4 | 6.7 | 1.3 | 1.1 | | | 7.5 | 3.8 1.0 – Ora! 2.8 – Others | 6.1 | 43.8 | 40.7 |
| 26–27 Aug | Termometro Politico | 2,600 | 27.1 | 21.5 | 12.7 | 6.0 | 7.4 | 2.8 | 2.5 | 6.2 | 1.9 | 1.1 | | | 6.7 | 4.1 | 5.6 | 44.8 | 41.6 |
| 18–27 Aug | Winpoll | 1,500 | 25.7 | 22.0 | 11.1 | 5.5 | 7.3 | 2.3 | 2.5 | 7.8 | 1.5 | | | | 7.5 | 6.8 1.1 – Peace Land Dignity; 5.7 – Others | 3.7 | 44.9 | 38.5 |
| 24 Aug | Piepoli | 500 | 28.0 | 20.5 | 12.5 | 6.0 | 7.5 | 3.0 | 2.5 | 6.5 | 1.0 | 1.5 | | 1.5 | 7.5 | 2.5 1.5 – South calls North; 0.5 – Ora! 0.5 – Others | 7.5 | 43.0 | 43.0 |
| 22–24 Aug | BiDiMedia | 1,000 | 25.4 | 21.0 | 12.6 | 4.8 | 7.3 | 2.8 | 2.0 | 6.5 | 1.0 | 1.0 | | 1.0 | 8.0 | 6.6 1.3 – South calls North; 1.0 – Civic Project Italy; 0.9 – Power to the People! 0.7 – Ora! 0.7 – Union of the Centre; 0.6 – Avanti – PSI; 0.5 – Communist Refoundation Party; 0.9 – Others | 4.4 | 44.7 | 39.2 |
| 2–5 Aug | BiDiMedia | 1,000 | 26.2 | 21.4 | 12.0 | 5.2 | 7.2 | 3.0 | 2.2 | 6.6 | 1.1 | 0.9 | | 0.9 | 7.1 | 6.2 1.2 – South calls North; 1.0 – Civic Project Italy; 0.7 – Power to the People! 0.6 – Ora! 0.6 – Avanti – PSI; 0.6 – Union of the Centre; 0.5 – Communist Refoundation Party; 1.0 – Others | 4.8 | 44.9 | 40.1 |
| 29 Jul – 3 Aug | SWG | 1,200 | 27.0 | 20.6 | 13.0 | 5.5 | 7.4 | 3.3 | 2.4 | 6.5 | 1.2 | 1.0 | | | 7.2 | 4.9 1.0 – Ora! 1.0 – South calls North; 2.9 – Others | 6.4 | 43.7 | 40.9 |
| 24 Jul – 3 Aug | Winpoll | 1,500 | 25.3 | 22.2 | 10.8 | 5.7 | 7.1 | 2.5 | 2.6 | 8.1 | 1.3 | | | | 7.8 | 5.3 1.3 – Peace Land Dignity; 4.0 – Others | 3.1 | 45.0 | 38.1 |
| 29–30 Jul | Termometro Politico | 2,400 | 27.3 | 21.5 | 12.8 | 5.9 | 7.6 | 3.0 | 2.6 | 6.3 | 1.6 | 1.0 | | | 6.4 | 4.0 | 5.8 | 44.8 | 41.8 |
| 28–29 Jul | Demopolis | 2,000 | 28.0 | 22.0 | 13.0 | 6.2 | 7.8 | 2.8 | 2.3 | 6.4 | 1.2 | 1.0 | | | 7.0 | | 6.0 | 44.9 | 43.0 |
| 14–28 Jul | EMG | 1,000 | 25.2 | 21.0 | 12.6 | 7.7 | 8.1 | 2.5 | 2.6 | 5.8 | 1.3 | 1.7 | | 1.7 | 7.0 | 2.8 | 4.2 | 43.3 | 42.7 |
| 22–27 Jul | SWG | 1,200 | 27.0 | 20.9 | 12.9 | 5.7 | 7.6 | 3.4 | 2.3 | 6.5 | 1.2 | 1.0 | | | 6.9 | 4.6 1.0 – Ora! 1.0 – South calls North; 2.6 – Others | 6.1 | 43.8 | 41.3 |
| 22–23 Jul | Termometro Politico | 2,300 | 27.5 | 21.7 | 12.5 | 5.9 | 7.8 | 3.2 | 2.4 | 6.4 | 1.6 | 1.1 | | | 6.1 | 3.8 | 5.8 | 44.6 | 42.3 |
| 20–23 Jul | Ipsos | 1,000 | 26.5 | 20.1 | 14.5 | 5.1 | 8.3 | 3.1 | 2.3 | 6.3 | 1.4 | 0.9 | | | 7.1 | 4.4 | 6.4 | 44.6 | 40.8 |
| 21–22 Jul | Quorum | 810 | 26.4 | 21.9 | 11.5 | 4.9 | 7.9 | 3.7 | 2.1 | 6.8 | 1.9 | 0.8 | | 1.0 | 7.6 | 3.5 0.9 – Ora! 2.6 – Others | 4.5 | 44.2 | 40.0 |
| 21–22 Jul | Piepoli | 500 | 27.5 | 21.0 | 13.0 | 6.0 | 7.5 | 3.0 | 2.5 | 6.5 | 1.0 | 1.5 | | 1.5 | 6.5 | 2.5 1.5 – South calls North; 0.5 – Ora! 0.5 – Others | 6.5 | 44.0 | 42.5 |
| 20–21 Jul | EMG | 1,000 | 24.6 | 21.2 | 12.5 | 7.7 | 8.3 | 2.5 | 2.6 | 5.8 | 1.4 | 1.7 | | 1.7 | 7.2 | 2.8 | 3.4 | 43.5 | 42.3 |
| 15–20 Jul | SWG | 1,200 | 26.9 | 21.1 | 13.1 | 5.5 | 7.7 | 3.4 | 2.5 | 6.4 | 1.2 | 1.0 | | | 6.7 | 4.5 1.0 – South calls North; 3.5 – Others | 5.8 | 44.3 | 41.1 |
| 1–17 Jul | Lab21 | 5,302 | 29.7 | 20.1 | 13.9 | 5.3 | 6.7 | 3.1 | 2.5 | 5.9 | 1.7 | 0.8 | | | 6.5 | 3.8 1.6 – South calls North; 2.2 – Others | 9.6 | 44.1 | 42.5 |
| 14–16 Jul | Termometro Politico | 2,700 | 27.7 | 21.5 | 12.8 | 6.0 | 7.6 | 3.1 | 2.4 | 6.4 | 1.7 | 1.0 | | | 6.1 | 3.7 | 6.2 | 44.8 | 42.3 |
| 3–16 Jul | EMG | 1,000 | 24.6 | 20.9 | 12.7 | 7.5 | 8.4 | 2.6 | 2.6 | 6.0 | 1.5 | 1.7 | | 1.8 | 7.3 | 2.4 | 3.7 | 43.7 | 42.2 |
| 8–13 Jul | SWG | 1,200 | 27.2 | 21.3 | 12.9 | 5.4 | 7.7 | 3.5 | 2.5 | 6.4 | 1.3 | 1.1 | | | 6.3 | 4.4 1.0 – Avanti – PSI; 3.4 – Others | 5.9 | 44.4 | 41.4 |
| 10–12 Jul | BiDiMedia | 1,000 | 26.9 | 21.5 | 11.4 | 4.9 | 7.2 | 2.8 | 2.1 | 6.5 | 1.0 | 0.7 | 0.5 | 0.7 | 6.7 | 7.6 1.3 – Schierarsi; 1.1 – South calls North; 1.0 – ControCorrente; 0.7 – Ora! 0.6 – Communist Refoundation Party; 0.5 – Avanti – PSI; 0.5 – Power to the People! 0.5 – Union of the Centre; 0.5 – Civic Project Italy; 1.4 – Others | 5.4 | 43.5 | 40.2 |
| 8–9 Jul | Termometro Politico | 2,100 | 27.5 | 21.6 | 12.5 | 6.5 | 7.8 | 2.9 | 2.6 | 6.4 | 1.6 | 1.1 | | | 5.8 | 3.7 | 5.9 | 44.7 | 42.9 |
| 6–7 Jul | EMG | 1,000 | 25.0 | 21.0 | 12.8 | 7.4 | 8.8 | 2.5 | 2.5 | 6.0 | 1.6 | 1.6 | | 1.8 | 6.7 | 2.3 | 4.0 | 43.9 | 42.8 |
| 30 Jun – 7 Jul | Ixè | 1,000 | 27.5 | 21.4 | 12.8 | 5.1 | 7.7 | 3.1 | 2.2 | 7.1 | 1.1 | 1.1 | | | 7.1 | 3.8 | 6.1 | 44.6 | 41.4 |
| 4–6 Jul | BiDiMedia | 1,000 | 26.7 | 21.8 | 12.2 | 5.7 | 7.3 | 2.9 | 2.4 | 6.5 | 0.9 | 0.6 | 0.5 | 1.0 | 6.2 | 5.3 1.1 – South calls North; 0.7 – Ora! 0.6 – Avanti – PSI; 0.6 – Power to the People! 0.6 – Communist Refoundation Party; 0.5 – Union of the Centre; 0.5 – Civic Project Italy; 0.7 – Others | 4.9 | 44.9 | 40.8 |
| 1–6 Jul | SWG | 1,200 | 27.1 | 21.5 | 13.1 | 5.6 | 7.4 | 3.4 | 2.5 | 6.5 | 1.4 | 1.1 | | | 6.0 | 4.4 1.0 – South calls North; 1.0 – Avanti – PSI; 2.4 – Others | 5.6 | 45.0 | 41.2 |
| 1–3 Jul | Tecnè | 1,001 | 29.0 | 21.5 | 12.8 | 6.0 | 8.6 | 2.8 | 2.1 | 6.4 | 1.3 | 0.9 | | | 5.9 | 2.7 | 7.5 | 44.1 | 44.5 |
| 1–2 Jul | Termometro Politico | 2,000 | 27.9 | 21.5 | 12.3 | 6.4 | 7.8 | 2.8 | 2.4 | 6.6 | 1.7 | 1.1 | 1.0 | | 5.2 | 3.3 | 6.4 | 44.5 | 43.2 |
| 30 Jun – 1 Jul | Piepoli | 500 | 28.0 | 21.0 | 13.0 | 6.0 | 8.0 | 3.0 | 3.0 | 6.0 | 1.0 | 1.5 | | 1.5 | 5.0 | 3.0 1.5 – South calls North; 1.0 – Ora! 2.5 – Others | 7.0 | 44.0 | 43.5 |
| 30 Jun – 1 Jul | Quorum | 810 | 26.9 | 22.0 | 12.0 | 5.4 | 7.6 | 3.4 | 2.5 | 6.6 | 1.3 | 0.8 | | 1.1 | 6.4 | 4.0 1.0 – Ora! 3.0 – Others | 4.9 | 44.4 | 40.7 |
| 17–30 Jun | EMG | 1,000 | 25.6 | 20.8 | 13.0 | 7.4 | 8.5 | 2.6 | 2.5 | 6.0 | 1.5 | 1.6 | | 1.8 | 6.2 | 2.5 | 4.8 | 43.8 | 43.1 |
| 24–29 Jun | SWG | 1,200 | 27.3 | 21.8 | 13.3 | 5.4 | 7.2 | 3.5 | 2.4 | 6.4 | 1.5 | 1.2 | | | 5.6 | 4.4 1.0 – South calls North; 1.0 – Avanti – PSI; 2.4 – Others | 5.5 | 45.4 | 41.1 |
| 25–26 Jun | Tecnè | 998 | 29.3 | 21.5 | 12.7 | 6.4 | 8.7 | 2.9 | 2.2 | 6.5 | 1.4 | 0.9 | | | 4.9 | 2.6 | 7.8 | 44.3 | 45.3 |
| 24–25 Jun | Termometro Politico | 2,500 | 28.2 | 21.6 | 12.5 | 6.4 | 8.0 | 2.9 | 2.6 | 6.3 | 1.6 | 1.0 | 1.2 | | 4.7 | 3.0 | 6.6 | 44.6 | 43.6 |
| 22–25 Jun | Ipsos | 1,000 | 27.0 | 20.1 | 14.3 | 5.6 | 8.3 | 3.0 | 2.0 | 6.2 | 1.9 | 0.8 | | | 6.0 | 4.8 | 6.9 | 44.5 | 41.7 |
| 22–23 Jun | EMG | 1,000 | 26.0 | 20.5 | 13.2 | 7.4 | 8.3 | 2.7 | 2.4 | 6.1 | 1.5 | 1.6 | | 1.7 | 6.6 | 2.0 | 5.5 | 43.7 | 43.3 |
| 17–22 Jun | SWG | 1,200 | 27.7 | 21.8 | 13.2 | 5.4 | 7.4 | 3.7 | 2.5 | 6.6 | 1.6 | 1.0 | | | 5.3 | 2.8 1.0 – Ora! 1.8 – Others | 5.9 | 45.7 | 41.5 |
| 18–19 Jun | BiDiMedia | 1,000 | 27.6 | 22.2 | 12.0 | 6.0 | 7.3 | 2.9 | 2.2 | 6.6 | 1.0 | 1.0 | 0.7 | 0.9 | 5.4 | 4.2 0.9 – Power to the People! 0.7 – Communist Refoundation Party; 0.7 – Ora! 0.5 – Avanti – PSI; 1.4 – Others | 5.4 | 44.0 | 41.9 |
| 18–19 Jun | Tecnè | 998 | 29.3 | 21.5 | 12.4 | 6.5 | 8.7 | 3.0 | 2.3 | 6.4 | 1.5 | 1.0 | | | 4.6 | 2.8 | 7.8 | 44.1 | 45.5 |
| 15–19 Jun | Sigma Piave | 800 | 26.0 | 20.8 | 13.0 | 6.2 | 8.6 | 3.4 | 2.1 | 6.5 | 1.1 | 1.1 | | | 7.2 | 4.0 | 5.2 | 43.5 | 41.9 |
| 17–18 Jun | Termometro Politico | 2,500 | 28.0 | 21.6 | 12.4 | 6.8 | 7.7 | 2.9 | 2.5 | 6.2 | 1.6 | 1.0 | 1.3 | | 4.7 | 3.3 | 6.4 | 44.3 | 43.5 |
| 16–17 Jun | Eumetra | 800 | 28.2 | 21.7 | 12.8 | 6.2 | 7.8 | 3.1 | 2.3 | 6.6 | 1.3 | 1.1 | | | 5.0 | 3.9 | 6.5 | 44.7 | 43.3 |
| 16–17 Jun | Quorum | 825 | 27.8 | 22.2 | 12.1 | 5.8 | 8.2 | 3.1 | 2.1 | 6.8 | 1.0 | 0.9 | | 1.2 | 5.9 | 2.9 1.1 – Ora! 1.8 – Others | 5.6 | 44.2 | 42.7 |
| 3–16 Jun | EMG | 1,000 | 26.2 | 20.2 | 13.2 | 7.7 | 8.4 | 2.7 | 2.2 | 6.4 | 1.7 | 1.6 | | 1.6 | 5.7 | 2.4 | 6.0 | 43.7 | 43.9 |
| 10–15 Jun | SWG | 1,200 | 27.9 | 22.1 | 13.3 | 5.3 | 7.2 | 3.5 | 2.4 | 6.5 | 1.6 | 1.1 | | | 5.3 | 2.8 1.0 – Ora! 1.8 – Others | 5.8 | 45.9 | 41.5 |
| 11–12 Jun | Tecnè | 1,002 | 29.3 | 21.5 | 12.7 | 6.7 | 8.7 | 2.9 | 2.2 | 6.3 | 1.4 | 1.1 | | | 4.0 | 3.2 | 7.8 | 44.1 | 45.8 |
| 10–11 Jun | Termometro Politico | 2,100 | 28.0 | 21.8 | 12.4 | 6.6 | 7.6 | 3.0 | 2.3 | 6.2 | 1.7 | 1.2 | 1.3 | | 4.4 | 3.5 | 6.2 | 44.4 | 43.4 |
| 9–10 Jun | Demopolis | 2,000 | 28.6 | 22.3 | 13.2 | 7.0 | 7.8 | 2.9 | 2.3 | 6.4 | 1.4 | 1.1 | | | 4.5 | | 6.3 | 45.6 | 44.5 |
| 8–9 Jun | EMG | 1,000 | 26.7 | 20.8 | 12.9 | 8.1 | 8.2 | 2.5 | 2.3 | 6.4 | 1.9 | 1.6 | 1.0 | 1.6 | 5.0 | 1.0 | 5.9 | 44.3 | 44.6 |
| 8–9 Jun | Only Numbers | 800 | 28.0 | 21.8 | 11.7 | 7.0 | 8.3 | 3.0 | 2.7 | 6.5 | 1.4 | 1.1 | | | 4.5 | 4.0 | 6.2 | 44.1 | 44.4 |
| 7–8 Jun | Runoff of 24–25 May local elections | | | | | | | | | | | | | | | | | | |
| 3–8 Jun | SWG | 1,200 | 28.3 | 22.0 | 13.1 | 5.6 | 7.0 | 3.6 | 2.4 | 6.5 | 1.5 | 1.2 | | | 4.8 | 4.0 1.0 – Ora! 3.0 – Others | 6.3 | 45.5 | 42.1 |
| 4–5 Jun | Tecnè | 1,000 | 29.3 | 21.8 | 12.5 | 6.9 | 8.8 | 2.9 | 2.3 | 6.4 | 1.3 | 1.0 | | | 3.8 | 3.0 | 7.5 | 44.3 | 46.0 |
| 3–4 Jun | Piepoli | 500 | 28.5 | 21.0 | 12.5 | 6.0 | 8.5 | 2.5 | 3.0 | 7.0 | 1.5 | 1.5 | | 1.5 | 4.5 | 2.0 1.5 – South calls North; 0.5 – Others | 7.5 | 45.0 | 44.5 |
| 3–4 Jun | Termometro Politico | 2,200 | 27.8 | 21.8 | 12.6 | 6.9 | 7.7 | 2.8 | 2.4 | 6.3 | 1.7 | 1.0 | 1.2 | | 4.5 | 3.3 | 6.0 | 44.8 | 43.4 |
| 3 Jun | Eumetra | 800 | 28.6 | 21.8 | 12.6 | 6.4 | 8.0 | 3.1 | 2.4 | 6.6 | 1.4 | 1.2 | | | 4.2 | 3.7 | 6.8 | 44.8 | 44.2 |
| 3 Jun | Demopolis | 2,000 | 28.8 | 22.4 | 13.0 | 7.3 | 8.2 | 2.7 | 2.3 | 6.5 | 1.3 | 1.1 | | | 3.9 | | 6.4 | 45.5 | 45.4 |
| 20 May – 2 Jun | EMG | 1,000 | 27.1 | 20.9 | 12.9 | 8.1 | 8.6 | 2.5 | 2.5 | 6.7 | 1.7 | 1.6 | | 1.4 | 4.2 | 1.8 | 6.2 | 44.7 | 45.4 |
| 27 May – 1 Jun | SWG | 1,200 | 28.2 | 22.3 | 13.0 | 5.8 | 7.2 | 3.4 | 2.4 | 6.7 | 1.4 | 1.2 | | | 4.6 | 3.8 0.9 – Ora! 2.9 – Others | 5.9 | 45.8 | 42.4 |
| 29–31 May | Only Numbers | 800 | 28.2 | 22.4 | 12.1 | 7.4 | 8.3 | 3.1 | 2.5 | 6.3 | 1.1 | 1.0 | | | 4.3 | 3.3 | 5.8 | 44.4 | 44.9 |
| 22–31 May | Winpoll | 1,500 | 27.3 | 22.5 | 11.5 | 6.7 | 7.8 | 2.2 | 3.2 | 7.5 | 1.1 | | | | 4.2 | 6.0 1.1 – Peace Land Dignity; 4.9 – Others | 4.8 | 45.8 | 41.8 |
| 28–29 May | Tecnè | 1,001 | 29.4 | 22.1 | 12.4 | 7.0 | 8.8 | 2.8 | 2.4 | 6.3 | 1.4 | 0.9 | | | 3.6 | 2.9 | 7.3 | 44.6 | 46.1 |
| 27–28 May | Termometro Politico | 2,400 | 28.1 | 22.0 | 12.7 | 6.8 | 7.9 | 2.9 | 2.5 | 6.0 | 1.8 | 1.1 | 1.3 | | 4.0 | 2.9 | 6.1 | 45.0 | 43.9 |
| 25–28 May | Ipsos | 1,000 | 27.6 | 20.1 | 14.5 | 5.7 | 8.2 | 3.1 | 2.0 | 6.8 | 1.5 | 0.8 | | | 4.8 | 4.9 | 7.5 | 44.9 | 42.3 |
| 26–27 May | Quorum | 815 | 27.7 | 21.7 | 13.5 | 5.9 | 7.8 | 3.2 | 2.2 | 6.4 | 1.1 | 1.0 | | 1.2 | 4.4 | 3.8 1.1 – Ora! 2.7 – Others | 6.0 | 44.9 | 42.4 |
| 25–27 May | BiDiMedia | 1,000 | 28.0 | 22.3 | 12.1 | 6.5 | 7.5 | 2.8 | 2.0 | 6.6 | 1.0 | 0.7 | 1.0 | 0.8 | 4.5 | 4.2 0.8 – Power to the People! 0.8 – Communist Refoundation Party; 0.6 – Ora! 0.5 – Avanti – PSI; 1.5 – Others | 5.7 | 44.0 | 42.7 |
| 25–26 May | EMG | 1,000 | 26.4 | 21.4 | 13.0 | 8.1 | 9.0 | 2.4 | 2.5 | 6.8 | 1.5 | 1.6 | 1.0 | 1.5 | 3.8 | 1.0 | 5.0 | 45.2 | 45.1 |
| 25–26 May | Only Numbers | 800 | 28.7 | 22.8 | 11.5 | 7.6 | 8.7 | 3.1 | 2.5 | 6.6 | 1.2 | 1.0 | | | 4.2 | 2.1 | 5.9 | 44.6 | 46.0 |
| 24–25 May | Local elections | | | | | | | | | | | | | | | | | | |
| 20–25 May | SWG | 1,200 | 28.1 | 22.5 | 12.7 | 6.0 | 7.4 | 3.5 | 2.5 | 6.6 | 1.4 | 1.3 | | | 4.3 | 3.7 | 5.6 | 45.7 | 42.8 |
| 18–25 May | Sigma Piave | 800 | 27.1 | 21.7 | 14.0 | 7.2 | 7.7 | 2.5 | 3.0 | 6.4 | 1.7 | 1.0 | | | 4.3 | 3.4 | 5.4 | 46.8 | 43.0 |
| 21–22 May | Tecnè | 1,000 | 29.2 | 22.0 | 12.7 | 6.9 | 8.8 | 2.9 | 2.5 | 6.2 | 1.5 | 1.0 | | | 3.3 | 3.0 | 7.2 | 44.9 | 45.9 |
| 20–21 May | Termometro Politico | 2,400 | 28.1 | 22.2 | 12.5 | 6.8 | 7.8 | 3.1 | 2.4 | 6.2 | 1.8 | 1.0 | 1.3 | | 4.1 | 2.7 | 5.9 | 45.1 | 43.7 |
| 19–20 May | Eumetra | 800 | 28.4 | 22.1 | 12.7 | 6.7 | 8.2 | 3.3 | 2.4 | 6.7 | 1.6 | 1.3 | | | 3.9 | 2.7 | 6.3 | 45.5 | 44.6 |
| 18–19 May | Only Numbers | 800 | 28.4 | 22.3 | 12.1 | 7.8 | 8.4 | 3.2 | 2.8 | 6.4 | 1.6 | 0.8 | | | 4.0 | 2.2 | 6.1 | 45.2 | 45.4 |
| 18 May | Piepoli | 500 | 29.0 | 21.0 | 13.0 | 6.5 | 8.0 | 2.5 | 3.0 | 7.0 | 1.0 | 1.5 | | 1.5 | 3.5 | 2.5 | 8.0 | 45.0 | 45.0 |
| 06–19 May | EMG | 1,000 | 26.3 | 21.7 | 12.8 | 8.0 | 8.8 | 2.5 | 2.6 | 6.8 | 1.7 | 1.6 | 1.0 | 1.6 | 3.6 | 1.0 | 4.6 | 45.6 | 44.7 |
| 13–18 May | SWG | 1,200 | 28.5 | 22.2 | 12.5 | 6.0 | 7.6 | 3.5 | 2.4 | 6.7 | 1.4 | 1.3 | | | 4.1 | 3.8 | 6.3 | 45.2 | 43.4 |
| 13–15 May | Tecnè | 1,000 | 28.9 | 22.1 | 12.9 | 7.1 | 8.8 | 3.0 | 2.4 | 6.3 | 1.4 | 1.0 | | | 3.1 | 3.0 | 6.8 | 45.1 | 45.8 |
| 12–14 May | Termometro Politico | 2,400 | 28.4 | 22.2 | 12.4 | 7.0 | 8.0 | 3.0 | 2.4 | 6.2 | 1.7 | 1.0 | 1.3 | | 3.8 | 2.6 | 6.2 | 44.9 | 44.4 |
| 11–12 May | Only Numbers | 800 | 28.3 | 22.5 | 11.9 | 8.0 | 8.5 | 3.1 | 2.7 | 6.5 | 1.7 | 0.8 | | | 3.5 | 2.5 | 5.8 | 45.3 | 45.6 |
| 11–12 May | EMG | 1,000 | 26.6 | 21.7 | 12.8 | 8.0 | 8.5 | 2.5 | 2.7 | 6.6 | 1.9 | 1.6 | 1.0 | 1.6 | 3.2 | 1.3 | 4.9 | 45.7 | 44.7 |
| 06–11 May | SWG | 1,200 | 28.8 | 22.0 | 12.2 | 6.2 | 7.5 | 3.4 | 2.6 | 6.8 | 1.5 | 1.1 | | | 3.9 | 4.0 | 6.8 | 45.1 | 43.6 |
| 06–8 May | Termometro Politico | 2,300 | 28.7 | 22.1 | 12.7 | 7.2 | 7.7 | 2.8 | 2.6 | 6.0 | 1.9 | 1.0 | 1.2 | | 3.7 | 2.4 | 6.6 | 45.3 | 44.6 |
| 05–7 May | Tecnè | 1,000 | 28.9 | 22.2 | 13.0 | 7.2 | 8.9 | 2.9 | 2.3 | 6.2 | 1.5 | 1.0 | | | 3.0 | 2.9 | 6.7 | 45.2 | 46.0 |
| 05–6 May | Eumetra | 800 | 28.2 | 22.2 | 12.5 | 6.8 | 8.3 | 3.1 | 2.5 | 6.7 | 1.5 | 1.1 | | | 3.6 | 3.5 | 6.0 | 45.4 | 44.4 |
| 04–6 May | Demos&Pi | 999 | 28.6 | 21.5 | 13.0 | 7.8 | 8.0 | 3.5 | 2.0 | 5.8 | 2.1 | | | | 4.0 | 3.7 | 7.1 | 44.4 | 44.4 |
| 04–5 May | Only Numbers | 800 | 28.0 | 22.4 | 12.3 | 8.0 | 8.5 | 3.2 | 2.5 | 6.6 | 1.5 | 0.8 | | | 3.5 | 2.7 | 5.6 | 45.3 | 45.3 |
| 04–5 May | BiDiMedia | 1,000 | 27.8 | 22.5 | 13.0 | 6.2 | 7.8 | 3.0 | 2.2 | 6.8 | 1.2 | 0.8 | 1.2 | 0.7 | 3.3 | 3.5 0.7 – Power to the People! 0.7 – Communist Refoundation Party; 0.5 – Ora! 1.6 – Others | 5.3 | 45.7 | 42.6 |
| 23 Apr – 5 May | EMG | 1,000 | 26.6 | 21.5 | 13.0 | 8.1 | 8.4 | 2.5 | 2.7 | 6.4 | 1.9 | 1.6 | 1.2 | 1.6 | 3.3 | 1.2 | 5.1 | 45.5 | 44.7 |
| 28 Apr – 4 May | SWG | 1,200 | 28.8 | 21.8 | 12.4 | 6.1 | 7.5 | 3.5 | 2.5 | 6.9 | 1.6 | 1.2 | | | 3.6 | 4.1 | 7.0 | 45.2 | 43.6 |
| 27–29 Apr | Ipsos | 1,000 | 26.2 | 22.3 | 14.3 | 5.8 | 9.0 | 3.1 | 2.0 | 6.7 | 1.3 | 1.0 | | | 4.1 | 4.2 | 3.9 | 46.6 | 42.0 |
| 27–28 Apr | EMG | 1,000 | 27.2 | 21.7 | 13.0 | 8.0 | 8.2 | 2.5 | 2.8 | 6.3 | 1.8 | 1.6 | 1.2 | 1.5 | 3.2 | 1.0 | 5.5 | 45.6 | 45.0 |
| 27–28 Apr | Only Numbers | 1,000 | 28.2 | 23.1 | 11.8 | 8.5 | 8.7 | 3.1 | 2.6 | 6.8 | 1.5 | 0.3 | | | 3.3 | 2.1 | 5.1 | 45.8 | 45.7 |
| 27–28 Apr | Quorum | 813 | 26.6 | 22.7 | 13.4 | 6.8 | 8.2 | 3.5 | 2.3 | 6.3 | 1.2 | 1.3 | | 1.3 | 3.5 | 2.9 | 3.9 | 45.9 | 42.9 |
| 22–27 Apr | SWG | 1,200 | 29.1 | 21.6 | 12.5 | 6.2 | 7.7 | 3.4 | 2.3 | 6.7 | 1.5 | 1.1 | | | 3.6 | 4.3 | 7.5 | 44.6 | 44.1 |
| 20–27 Apr | Winpoll | 1,500 | 26.6 | 23.0 | 11.4 | 6.4 | 8.5 | 2.7 | 3.1 | 7.5 | 1.3 | | | | 3.7 | 5.8 1.5 – Peace Land Dignity; 4.3 – Others | 3.6 | 46.3 | 41.5 |
| 20–27 Apr | Ixè | 1,000 | 28.4 | 23.4 | 12.9 | 6.0 | 8.3 | 3.1 | 2.5 | 6.9 | 1.5 | 1.0 | | | 3.4 | 2.6 | 5.0 | 47.2 | 43.7 |
| 22–23 Apr | Termometro Politico | 2,500 | 28.4 | 22.0 | 12.4 | 7.4 | 7.9 | 3.0 | 2.6 | 6.3 | 1.7 | 1.0 | 1.2 | | 3.7 | 2.4 | 6.4 | 45.0 | 44.7 |
| 20–21 Apr | Only Numbers | 1,000 | 28.8 | 22.5 | 12.2 | 8.3 | 8.6 | 3.0 | 2.5 | 6.5 | 1.7 | 0.8 | | | 3.6 | 1.5 | 6.3 | 45.4 | 46.5 |
| 21–22 Apr | Eumetra | 800 | 28.7 | 22.2 | 12.4 | 6.9 | 8.3 | 3.2 | 2.4 | 6.5 | 1.4 | 1.1 | | | 3.4 | 3.5 | 6.5 | 44.9 | 45.0 |
| 09–22 Apr | EMG | 1,000 | 27.1 | 21.7 | 12.9 | 8.0 | 8.0 | 2.5 | 2.7 | 6.2 | 1.8 | 1.6 | 1.3 | 1.4 | 3.6 | 1.2 | 5.4 | 45.3 | 44.7 |
| 17–20 Apr | Tecnè | 1,000 | 29.1 | 22.4 | 12.8 | 7.4 | 8.9 | 3.0 | 2.4 | 6.2 | 1.5 | 0.9 | | | 2.5 | 2.9 | 6.7 | 45.3 | 46.3 |
| 15–20 Apr | SWG | 1,200 | 29.3 | 21.6 | 12.4 | 6.5 | 7.8 | 3.3 | 2.4 | 6.7 | 1.5 | 1.1 | | | 3.4 | 4.0 | 7.7 | 44.6 | 44.7 |
| 13–20 Apr | Sigma Piave | 800 | 27.7 | 22.0 | 13.4 | 7.4 | 8.4 | 2.6 | 2.5 | 6.1 | 1.5 | 1.0 | | | 4.1 | 3.3 | 5.7 | 45.5 | 44.5 |
| 15–16 Apr | Termometro Politico | 2,700 | 28.6 | 22.0 | 12.5 | 7.2 | 8.1 | 2.9 | 2.4 | 6.4 | 1.8 | 1.0 | 1.2 | | 3.7 | 2.2 | 6.6 | 45.1 | 44.9 |
| 13–15 Apr | Piepoli | 520 | 29.0 | 22.0 | 13.5 | 6.5 | 8.5 | 2.5 | 2.5 | 6.5 | 1.0 | 1.5 | | 1.5 | 3.0 | 0.5 | 7.0 | 45.5 | 45.5 |
| 13–14 Apr | BiDiMedia | 1,000 | 27.6 | 22.7 | 13.2 | 6.7 | 7.6 | 2.6 | 2.0 | 7.1 | 1.0 | 0.8 | 0.9 | 0.5 | 3.7 | 3.3 0.7 – Power to the People! 0.6 – Communist Refoundation Party; 0.5 – Ora! 1.5 – Others | 4.9 | 46.0 | 42.7 |
| 13–14 Apr | EMG | 1,000 | 27.2 | 22.1 | 12.5 | 8.0 | 8.3 | 2.5 | 2.6 | 5.9 | 1.8 | 1.6 | 1.2 | 1.3 | 3.9 | 1.2 | 5.1 | 44.9 | 45.0 |
| 11–13 Apr | Quorum | 815 | 26.4 | 22.9 | 14.1 | 6.6 | 8.0 | 3.1 | 2.5 | 6.0 | 1.2 | 1.1 | | 1.1 | 4.1 | 2.9 | 3.5 | 46.7 | 42.1 |
| 8–13 Apr | SWG | 1,200 | 29.3 | 21.9 | 12.2 | 6.3 | 7.7 | 3.5 | 2.4 | 6.6 | 1.6 | 1.2 | | | 3.5 | 3.8 | 7.4 | 44.7 | 44.5 |
| 8–9 Apr | Termometro Politico | 2,500 | 29.2 | 22.0 | 12.3 | 7.3 | 7.9 | 3.0 | 2.4 | 6.5 | 1.8 | 1.0 | 1.2 | | 3.4 | 2.0 | 7.2 | 45.0 | 45.4 |
| 7–8 Apr | Demopolis | 2,000 | 28.5 | 22.6 | 13.0 | 7.2 | 8.3 | 2.7 | 2.4 | 6.6 | 1.4 | 1.0 | | | 3.5 | | 5.9 | 46.0 | 45.0 |
| 7–8 Apr | Eumetra | 800 | 28.4 | 22.5 | 12.3 | 6.7 | 8.5 | 3.3 | 2.2 | 6.3 | 1.4 | 1.1 | | | 3.1 | 4.2 | 5.0 | 44.7 | 44.7 |
| 26 Mar – 8 Apr | EMG | 1,000 | 27.1 | 22.4 | 12.3 | 8.0 | 8.4 | 2.5 | 2.5 | 5.8 | 1.8 | 1.5 | 1.3 | 1.2 | 4.1 | 1.2 | 4.7 | 44.7 | 45.0 |
| 6–7 Apr | Only Numbers | 1,000 | 27.3 | 22.3 | 11.7 | 8.3 | 8.8 | 3.2 | 2.4 | 6.5 | 1.9 | 0.7 | | | 3.4 | 3.5 | 5.0 | 44.8 | 45.1 |
| 2–3 Apr | Tecnè | 800 | 29.1 | 22.2 | 13.0 | 7.2 | 9.0 | 3.1 | 2.3 | 6.3 | 1.4 | 0.9 | | | 2.7 | 2.8 | 6.9 | 45.2 | 46.2 |
| 26 Mar – 3 Apr | Winpoll | 1,500 | 26.7 | 22.8 | 11.1 | 6.5 | 8.9 | 2.8 | 3.1 | 7.2 | 1.5 | | | | 3.1 | 6.3 1.6 – Peace Land Dignity; 4.7 – Others | 3.9 | 45.7 | 42.1 |
| 31 Mar – 2 Apr | Termometro Politico | 2,700 | 29.2 | 22.0 | 12.1 | 7.6 | 8.0 | 3.0 | 2.4 | 6.2 | 1.8 | 1.0 | 1.3 | | 3.4 | 2.0 | 7.2 | 44.5 | 45.8 |
| 31 Mar – 1 Apr | Eumetra | 800 | 28.9 | 21.9 | 12.3 | 6.5 | 8.3 | 3.4 | 2.3 | 6.6 | 1.5 | 1.1 | | | 3.2 | 4.0 | 7.0 | 44.6 | 44.8 |
| 30–31 Mar | EMG | 1,000 | 27.0 | 22.7 | 12.0 | 8.0 | 8.7 | 2.7 | 2.2 | 6.0 | 2.0 | 1.5 | 1.4 | 1.2 | 3.6 | 1.0 | 4.3 | 44.9 | 45.2 |
| 30–31 Mar | Only Numbers | 800 | 27.5 | 23.0 | 12.0 | 8.0 | 8.7 | 3.3 | 2.5 | 6.7 | 1.4 | 0.7 | | | 3.2 | 3.0 | 4.5 | 45.6 | 44.9 |
| 25–30 Mar | SWG | 1,200 | 29.5 | 22.0 | 12.3 | 6.6 | 7.9 | 3.4 | 2.3 | 6.6 | 1.4 | 1.1 | | | 3.3 | 3.6 | 7.5 | 44.6 | 45.1 |
| 27–28 Mar | BiDiMedia | 1,000 | 28.3 | 22.4 | 12.9 | 6.5 | 7.4 | 2.6 | 2.3 | 7.1 | 1.2 | 0.9 | 1.0 | 0.6 | 3.0 | 3.7 0.8 – Communist Refoundation Party; 0.7 – Power to the People! 0.5 – Ora! 1.7 – Others | 5.9 | 45.9 | 43.1 |
| 24–26 Mar | Ipsos | 1,000 | 26.7 | 22.0 | 14.2 | 6.3 | 9.5 | 3.0 | 2.3 | 6.1 | 1.5 | 1.0 | | | 3.0 | 4.4 | 4.7 | 46.1 | 43.5 |
| 24–25 Mar | Eumetra | 800 | 29.3 | 21.5 | 12.1 | 6.5 | 8.0 | 3.4 | 2.4 | 6.5 | 1.4 | 1.2 | | | 3.4 | 4.3 | 7.8 | 44.2 | 45.0 |
| 12–25 Mar | EMG | 1,000 | 27.0 | 22.7 | 11.5 | 7.9 | 9.1 | 2.8 | 2.3 | 6.0 | 2.3 | 1.5 | 1.3 | 1.2 | 3.3 | 1.1 | 4.3 | 44.8 | 45.5 |
| 22–23 Mar | Constitutional referendum (the No wins); Veneto 2 – 01 by-election (CDX hold); Veneto 2 – 02 by-election (CDX hold) | | | | | | | | | | | | | | | | | | |
| 18–23 Mar | SWG | 1,200 | 29.5 | 21.5 | 12.2 | 6.8 | 7.8 | 3.4 | 2.5 | 6.6 | 1.4 | 1.2 | | | 3.3 | 3.8 | 8.0 | 43.9 | 45.3 |
| 11–16 Mar | SWG | 1,200 | 29.4 | 21.7 | 12.3 | 6.6 | 8.0 | 3.5 | 2.3 | 6.6 | 1.5 | 1.1 | | | 3.5 | 3.5 | 7.7 | 44.4 | 45.0 |
| 10–11 Mar | Eumetra | 800 | 29.2 | 21.8 | 11.9 | 6.4 | 8.5 | 3.3 | 2.4 | 6.6 | 1.5 | 0.9 | | | 3.4 | 4.1 | 7.4 | 44.2 | 45.0 |
| 4–9 Mar | SWG | 1,200 | 29.4 | 21.8 | 12.0 | 6.8 | 8.2 | 3.3 | 2.4 | 6.8 | 1.5 | 1.0 | | | 3.4 | 3.4 | 7.6 | 44.5 | 45.4 |
| 3–4 Mar | Quorum | 817 | 28.7 | 22.4 | 12.9 | 6.4 | 8.1 | 4.3 | 2.2 | 6.5 | 1.3 | 0.9 | | | 3.2 | 3.1 | 6.3 | 45.3 | 44.1 |
| 3–4 Mar | Eumetra | 800 | 29.4 | 21.6 | 11.8 | 6.5 | 8.5 | 3.3 | 2.3 | 6.6 | 1.6 | 1.0 | | | 3.3 | 4.1 | 7.8 | 43.9 | 45.4 |
| 15 Feb – 2 Mar | SWG | 1,200 | 29.8 | 21.6 | 11.7 | 6.6 | 8.4 | 3.3 | 2.2 | 6.9 | 1.5 | 1.0 | | | 3.6 | 3.4 | 8.2 | 43.9 | 45.8 |
| 28 Feb – 1 Mar | BiDiMedia | 1,000 | 28.7 | 22.4 | 12.6 | 6.1 | 7.7 | 2.9 | 2.3 | 6.9 | 1.2 | 1.0 | 1.0 | 0.7 | 3.2 | 3.4 0.7 – Communist Refoundation Party; 0.6 – Ora! 0.5 – Power to the People! 1.6 – Others | 6.3 | 45.4 | 43.4 |
| 16–26 Feb | Winpoll | 1,500 | 25.7 | 23.1 | 11.1 | 6.4 | 8.4 | 3.6 | 2.9 | 6.7 | 1.8 | | | | 4.0 | 6.3 1.3 – Peace Land Dignity; 5.0 – Others | 2.6 | 45.6 | 40.5 |
| 23–26 Feb | Ipsos | 1,000 | 28.0 | 20.7 | 13.4 | 6.1 | 8.4 | 2.8 | 2.4 | 6.8 | 1.8 | 0.8 | | | 3.6 | | 7.3 | 45.1 | 43.3 |
| 24–25 Feb | Quorum | 809 | 28.7 | 21.8 | 12.3 | 6.1 | 8.4 | 4.3 | 1.6 | 6.6 | 1.5 | 1.1 | | | 4.1 | 3.5 | 6.9 | 43.8 | 44.3 |
| 18–23 Feb | SWG | 1,200 | 29.8 | 21.9 | 11.5 | 6.6 | 8.3 | 3.5 | 2.2 | 6.7 | 1.4 | 1.1 | | | 3.4 | 3.6 | 7.9 | 43.7 | 45.8 |
| 17–23 Feb | Ixè | | 28.9 | 22.9 | 12.7 | 6.2 | 8.8 | 2.9 | 2.1 | 7.6 | 1.5 | 1.0 | | | 2.7 | | 6.0 | 46.8 | 44.9 |
| 17–18 Feb | Quorum | 813 | 28.6 | 21.5 | 11.7 | 6.1 | 9.1 | 4.3 | 1.9 | 7.2 | 1.6 | 1.0 | | | 4.3 | 2.7 | 7.1 | 43.9 | 44.8 |
| 17–18 Feb | Eumetra | 800 | 29.9 | 22.1 | 11.8 | 6.7 | 8.5 | 3.2 | 2.3 | 6.5 | 1.4 | 1.1 | | | 3.1 | 3.4 | 7.8 | 44.1 | 46.2 |
| 11–16 Feb | SWG | 1,200 | 29.8 | 22.0 | 11.8 | 6.4 | 8.4 | 3.3 | 2.3 | 6.6 | 1.4 | 1.1 | | | 3.6 | 3.3 | 7.8 | 44.1 | 45.7 |
| 11–14 Feb | BiDiMedia | 2,000 | 28.9 | 22.3 | 12.2 | 6.7 | 8.0 | 3.0 | 2.2 | 7.0 | 1.3 | 0.8 | 0.8 | 0.6 | 2.5 | 3.7 0.8 – Communist Refoundation Party; 0.7 – Power to the People! 0.6 – Ora! 1.6 – Others | 6.6 | 45.0 | 44.4 |
| 11–12 Feb | Termometro Politico | 2,500 | 29.5 | 22.0 | 12.1 | 7.8 | 8.1 | 2.8 | 2.5 | 6.5 | 1.6 | 1.0 | | | 3.6 | 1.4 | 7.5 | 44.7 | 46.4 |
| 10–11 Feb | Eumetra | 815 | 30.2 | 22.3 | 11.9 | 7.0 | 8.5 | 3.0 | 2.3 | 6.4 | 1.5 | 1.2 | | | 2.6 | 3.1 | 7.9 | 44.4 | 46.9 |
| 9–10 Feb | EMG | 1,000 | 27.0 | 22.2 | 12.1 | 7.6 | 9.0 | 3.0 | 2.4 | 6.1 | 1.6 | 1.4 | 1.6 | 1.8 | 2.9 | 1.3 | 4.8 | 44.4 | 45.0 |
| 6–9 Feb | Quorum | 815 | 28.9 | 21.2 | 11.8 | 6.2 | 9.5 | 4.0 | 2.2 | 7.0 | 1.9 | 1.0 | | | 3.9 | 2.4 | 7.7 | 44.1 | 45.6 |
| 4–9 Feb | SWG | 1,200 | 30.1 | 22.2 | 11.7 | 6.6 | 8.4 | 3.1 | 2.2 | 6.4 | 1.5 | 1.2 | | | 3.3 | 3.3 | 7.9 | 44.0 | 46.3 |
| 5–8 Feb | BiDiMedia | 2,000 | 28.5 | 22.5 | 12.1 | 7.4 | 7.9 | 2.8 | 2.3 | 6.9 | 1.2 | 0.7 | 0.6 | 0.7 | 2.6 | 3.8 0.8 – Communist Refoundation Party; 0.7 – Power to the People! 0.7 – Ora! 1.6 – Others | 6.0 | 45.0 | 44.5 |
| 3–5 Feb | Termometro Politico | 2,900 | 29.8 | 22.0 | 11.9 | 7.7 | 8.3 | 2.8 | 2.4 | 6.4 | 1.6 | 1.0 | 1.1 | | 3.5 | 1.5 | 7.8 | 44.3 | 46.8 |
| 3 Feb | Quorum | 800 | 29.2 | 21.0 | 11.4 | 7.2 | 9.5 | 3.4 | 2.5 | 6.6 | 1.3 | 1.1 | | | 4.2 | 2.6 | 8.2 | 42.8 | 47.0 |
| 3 Feb | Roberto Vannacci leaves Lega and founds National Future, becoming its leader | | | | | | | | | | | | | | | | | | |
| 28 Jan – 2 Feb | SWG | 1,200 | 31.3 | 22.5 | 12.0 | 7.7 | 8.2 | 3.1 | 2.2 | 6.5 | 1.4 | 1.2 | | | Did not exist | 3.9 | 8.8 | 44.6 | 48.4 |
| 22–30 Jan | Winpoll | 1,500 | 29.6 | 22.5 | 10.8 | 9.7 | 9.4 | 2.7 | 2.5 | 6.8 | 0.7 | | | | Did not exist | 3.8 | 7.1 | 43.3 | 48.7 |
| 27–29 Jan | Termometro Politico | 2,700 | 30.3 | 22.2 | 12.1 | 8.4 | 8.6 | 3.0 | 2.5 | 6.5 | 1.7 | 1.0 | 1.3 | | Did not exist | 2.7 1.0 – Peace Land Dignity; 1.7 – Others | 8.1 | 45.0 | 48.3 |
| 26–27 Jan | EMG | 1,000 | 28.0 | 22.7 | 12.5 | 8.4 | 8.6 | 2.8 | 2.7 | 6.1 | 1.9 | 1.6 | 1.7 | 1.7 | Did not exist | 1.3 | 5.3 | 45.9 | 46.6 |
| 20–27 Jan | Ixè | 1,000 | 29.1 | 22.6 | 12.2 | 8.0 | 8.4 | 3.3 | 2.3 | 7.2 | 1.8 | 1.0 | | | Did not exist | 4.1 | 6.5 | 46.1 | 48.5 |
| 21–26 Jan | SWG | 1,200 | 31.2 | 22.6 | 12.1 | 8.0 | 8.2 | 3.0 | 2.0 | 6.6 | 1.3 | 1.1 | | | Did not exist | 3.9 | 8.6 | 44.6 | 48.5 |
| 21–22 Jan | Termometro Politico | 2,600 | 30.0 | 22.1 | 12.3 | 8.4 | 8.5 | 3.1 | 2.5 | 6.7 | 1.7 | 1.1 | 1.3 | | Did not exist | 2.3 1.1 – Peace Land Dignity; 1.2 – Others | 7.9 | 45.3 | 48.0 |
| 19–22 Jan | Ipsos | 1,000 | 29.4 | 21.8 | 13.3 | 8.0 | 8.7 | 2.3 | 2.3 | 6.2 | 1.3 | 1.0 | | | Did not exist | 5.7 | 7.6 | 44.9 | 47.1 |
| 8–21 Jan | EMG | 1,000 | 28.2 | 22.5 | 12.6 | 8.2 | 8.6 | 2.9 | 2.8 | 6.0 | 1.7 | 1.6 | 1.6 | 1.7 | Did not exist | 1.6 | 5.7 | 45.6 | 46.6 |
| 19–20 Jan | Quorum | 804 | 29.4 | 21.4 | 13.8 | 8.2 | 7.7 | 3.3 | 1.9 | 6.7 | 2.0 | 0.9 | | | Did not exist | 4.7 | 8.0 | 45.8 | 46.2 |
| 14–19 Jan | SWG | 1,200 | 31.1 | 22.4 | 12.4 | 8.0 | 8.4 | 2.8 | 2.0 | 6.4 | 1.3 | 1.2 | | | Did not exist | 4.0 | 8.7 | 44.5 | 48.7 |
| 13–15 Jan | Termometro Politico | 2,800 | 30.4 | 21.9 | 12.3 | 8.4 | 8.5 | 3.0 | 2.5 | 6.6 | 1.7 | 1.2 | 1.3 | | Did not exist | 2.2 1.1 – Peace Land Dignity; 1.1 – Others | 8.5 | 45.0 | 48.5 |
| 14–16 Jan | BiDiMedia | 1,000 | 29.2 | 22.1 | 12.8 | 8.6 | 8.3 | 3.0 | 2.0 | 6.7 | 1.3 | 0.7 | 1.2 | 0.6 | Did not exist | 3.0 0.9 – Communist Refoundation Party; 0.9 – Power to the People! 0.5 – Ora! 0.5 – Avanti – PSI; 0.2 – Others | 7.1 | 44.9 | 46.8 |
| 12–13 Jan | EMG | 1,000 | 28.6 | 22.3 | 12.8 | 8.3 | 8.3 | 3.0 | 2.8 | 5.9 | 1.8 | 1.6 | 1.7 | 1.7 | Did not exist | 0.7 | 6.3 | 45.6 | 46.8 |
| 07–12 Jan | SWG | 1,200 | 30.9 | 22.3 | 12.7 | 8.3 | 8.3 | 2.9 | 2.2 | 6.5 | 1.3 | 1.0 | | | Did not exist | 3.6 | 8.6 | 45.0 | 48.5 |
| 7 Jan | Eumetra | 800 | 30.5 | 21.8 | 13.0 | 8.2 | 8.4 | 3.2 | 2.5 | 6.6 | 1.6 | 1.1 | | | Did not exist | 3.1 | 8.7 | 45.5 | 48.2 |
| 31 Dec – 7 Jan | EMG | 1,000 | 28.8 | 22.0 | 13.0 | 8.4 | 8.4 | 3.1 | 2.9 | 5.7 | 1.8 | 1.6 | 1.6 | 1.6 | Did not exist | 1.1 | 6.8 | 45.4 | 47.2 |

=== 2025 ===
| Polling | | | Parties | | | | | | | | | | | | | | Coalitions | |
| Fieldwork date | Polling firm | Sample size | FdI | PD | M5S | Lega | FI | A | IV | AVS | +E | NM | DSP | PLD | Others | Lead | CSX | CDX |
|---|---|---|---|---|---|---|---|---|---|---|---|---|---|---|---|---|---|---|
| 17–22 Dec | SWG | 1,200 | 31.3 | 22.1 | 12.7 | 8.2 | 8.1 | 3.1 | 2.2 | 6.8 | 1.4 | 1.0 | | | 3.1 | 9.2 | 45.2 | 48.6 |
| 18–19 Dec | Quorum | 1,201 | 28.3 | 22.8 | 12.7 | 8.1 | 8.3 | 3.3 | 2.0 | 7.4 | 1.7 | 0.9 | | | 4.5 | 5.5 | 46.6 | 45.6 |
| 16–18 Dec | Termometro Politico | 2,600 | 30.4 | 22.1 | 12.0 | 8.7 | 8.6 | 3.0 | 2.4 | 6.5 | 1.6 | 1.1 | 1.3 | | 2.3 1.0 – Peace Land Dignity; 1.3 – Others | 7.2 | 44.6 | 48.8 |
| 16–18 Dec | Demopolis | 2,000 | 30.0 | 22.8 | 12.4 | 8.7 | 8.7 | 2.8 | 2.6 | 6.5 | | | | | 5.5 | 7.2 | 44.3 | 47.4 |
| 15–18 Dec | Ipsos | 1,000 | 28.4 | 21.3 | 13.5 | 8.1 | 8.3 | 3.1 | 2.5 | 6.1 | 1.6 | 1.0 | | | 6.1 | 7.1 | 45 | 45.8 |
| 15–16 Dec | BiDiMedia | 1,000 | 29.0 | 22.4 | 12.3 | 8.3 | 8.3 | 3.1 | 2.1 | 7.0 | 1.3 | 0.8 | 1.0 | 0.7 | 3.7 0.8 – Power to the People! 0.7 – Ora! 0.7 – Communist Refoundation Party; 0.5 – Avanti – PSI; 1.0 – Others | 6.4 | 45.1 | 46.4 |
| 15 Dec | Ipsos | 500 | 29.3 | 21.1 | 14.0 | 8.4 | 8.6 | 3.2 | 2.6 | 6.3 | 1.7 | 1.0 | | | 3.8 | 8.2 | 45.7 | 47.3 |
| 15 Dec | Piepoli | 500 | 32.0 | 21.5 | 11.0 | 8.5 | 9.0 | 3.5 | 3.0 | 5.5 | 1.5 | 1.5 | | 1.5 | 1.5 | 10.5 | 42.5 | 51 |
| 10–15 Dec | SWG | 1,200 | 31.0 | 22.3 | 12.8 | 8.4 | 8.1 | 3.0 | 2.3 | 6.8 | 1.4 | 1.1 | | | 2.8 | 8.7 | 45.6 | 48.6 |
| 1–12 Dec | EMG Different | 2,000 | 28.8 | 21.4 | 13.5 | 8.6 | 9.6 | 3.2 | 2.6 | 5.8 | 1.7 | | | | 4.8 | 7.4 | 45 | 47 |
| 10–11 Dec | Tecnè | 1,000 | 31.1 | 21.7 | 11.8 | 8.5 | 10.9 | 3.3 | 2.0 | 6.2 | 1.7 | | | | 2.8 | 9.4 | 43.4 | 50.5 |
| 9–11 Dec | BiDiMedia | 1,000 | 29.1 | 22.6 | 12.1 | 8.4 | 8.1 | 3.2 | 2.2 | 7.1 | 1.1 | 0.7 | 1.1 | 0.6 | 3.7 0.8 – Communist Refoundation Party; 0.7 – Power to the People! 0.6 – Ora! 0.5 – Avanti – PSI; 1.1 – Others | 6.5 | 45.1 | 46.3 |
| 9–11 Dec | Termometro Politico | 2,700 | 30.0 | 22.1 | 12.2 | 8.7 | 8.5 | 3.1 | 2.4 | 6.6 | 1.7 | 1.0 | | | 2.4 1.0 – Peace Land Dignity; 1.4 – Others | 7.9 | 45 | 48.2 |
| 3–8 Dec | SWG | 1,200 | 31.2 | 22.0 | 13.0 | 8.1 | 7.9 | 3.2 | 2.4 | 6.7 | 1.4 | 1.2 | | | 2.9 | 9.2 | 45.5 | 48.4 |
| 4–5 Dec | Quorum | 805 | 27.8 | 22.1 | 13.4 | 7.8 | 7.6 | 3.9 | 1.9 | 7.7 | 2.8 | 0.8 | | | 4.2 | 5.7 | 47.9 | 44 |
| 3–4 Dec | Tecnè | 1,000 | 31.0 | 21.8 | 11.6 | 8.5 | 11.0 | 3.2 | 2.1 | 6.1 | 1.8 | | | | 2.9 | 9.2 | 43.4 | 50.5 |
| 2–3 Dec | Eumetra | 800 | 30.9 | 22.0 | 12.7 | 8.1 | 8.3 | 3.4 | 2.6 | 6.7 | 1.4 | 1.2 | | | 2.7 | 8.9 | 45.4 | 48.5 |
| 1–2 Dec | Demopolis | 2,000 | 30.0 | 23.0 | 12.5 | 8.8 | 8.8 | 2.7 | 2.6 | 6.5 | | | | | 5.1 | 7.0 | 44.6 | 47.6 |
| 26 Nov – 1 Dec | SWG | 1,200 | 31.3 | 22.2 | 12.7 | 7.9 | 7.9 | 3.3 | 2.4 | 6.9 | 1.5 | 1.2 | | | 2.7 | 9.1 | 45.7 | 48.3 |
| 26–27 Nov | Tecné | 1,000 | 31.0 | 22.0 | 11.5 | 8.4 | 11.1 | 3.3 | 2.0 | 6.2 | 1.6 | | | | 2.9 | 9.0 | 43.3 | 50.5 |
| 26–27 Nov | Termometro Politico | 2,200 | 30.5 | 21.8 | 12.2 | 8.4 | 8.6 | 3.0 | 2.4 | 6.4 | 1.7 | 1.0 | | | 2.7 1.1 – Peace Land Dignity; 1.6 – Others | 8.7 | 44.5 | 48.5 |
| 24–27 Nov | Ipsos | 1,000 | 28.0 | 21.6 | 13.5 | 8.9 | 8.6 | 3.0 | 2.5 | 6.3 | 1.6 | 0.9 | | | 5.1 | 6.4 | 45.5 | 46.4 |
| 20–27 Nov | Ixè | 1,000 | 30.3 | 21.8 | 13.0 | 7.8 | 9.1 | 3.0 | 2.6 | 7.1 | 1.9 | 0.9 | | | 2.5 | 8.5 | 46.4 | 48.1 |
| 25–26 Nov | Eumetra | 800 | 31.1 | 22.2 | 12.6 | 7.9 | 8.2 | 3.2 | 2.5 | 6.9 | 1.4 | 1.2 | | | 2.7 | 8.9 | 45.6 | 48.4 |
| 23–24 Nov | Regional elections in Apulia (CSX hold); regional elections in Campania (CSX hold); regional elections in Veneto (CDX hold) | | | | | | | | | | | | | | | | | |
| 19–24 Nov | SWG | 1,200 | 31.6 | 22.3 | 12.5 | 7.7 | 7.9 | 3.3 | 2.5 | 7.0 | 1.4 | 1.2 | | | 2.6 | 9.2 | 45.7 | 48.4 |
| 21–23 Nov | BiDiMedia | 1,000 | 29.4 | 22.3 | 12.2 | 8.0 | 8.6 | 3.0 | 2.2 | 6.8 | 1.0 | 1.0 | 1.0 | 0.8 | 3.7 0.9 – Power to the People! 0.8 – Communist Refoundation Party; 0.7 – Ora! 0.5 – Avanti – PSI; 0.8 – Others | 7.1 | 44.5 | 47 |
| 19–20 Nov | Termometro Politico | 2,600 | 30.4 | 22.0 | 12.3 | 8.5 | 8.5 | 3.2 | 2.3 | 6.3 | 1.7 | 1.0 | | | 2.5 1.0 – Peace Land Dignity; 1.5 – Others | 8.4 | 44.6 | 48.4 |
| 17–18 Nov | Piepoli | 507 | 31.5 | 21.0 | 11.0 | 8.5 | 9.0 | 3.0 | 3.0 | 6.0 | 2.0 | 1.5 | | 1.5 | 2.0 | 10.5 | 43 | 50.5 |
| 12–17 Nov | SWG | 1,200 | 31.4 | 22.0 | 12.8 | 7.8 | 8.0 | 3.2 | 2.5 | 6.9 | 1.5 | 1.3 | | | 2.6 | 9.4 | 45.7 | 48.5 |
| 11–13 Nov | Termometro Politico | 2,600 | 30.4 | 21.8 | 12.0 | 8.4 | 8.3 | 3.0 | 2.5 | 6.6 | 1.7 | 1.0 | 1.4 | | 2.9 1.1 – Peace Land Dignity; 1.8 – Others | 8.6 | 44.6 | 48.1 |
| 11–12 Nov | Eumetra | 800 | 30.7 | 22.1 | 12.9 | 8.1 | 8.7 | 3.4 | 2.4 | 6.7 | 1.5 | 1.1 | | | 2.4 | 8.6 | 45.6 | 48.6 |
| 5–10 Nov | SWG | 1,200 | 31.3 | 22.2 | 12.8 | 8.0 | 8.1 | 3.0 | 2.5 | 6.7 | 1.5 | 1.1 | | | 2.8 | 9.1 | 45.7 | 48.5 |
| 6 Nov | BiDiMedia | 1,000 | 29.5 | 22.2 | 12.5 | 8.1 | 8.3 | 2.8 | 2.3 | 6.9 | 1.1 | 0.9 | 1.0 | 0.6 | 2.8 0.8 – Power to the People! 0.7 – Communist Refoundation Party; 0.7 – Ora! 0.6 – Avanti – PSI | 6.8 | 45.6 | 46.8 |
| 4–6 Nov | Tecné | 1,000 | 31.1 | 21.7 | 11.5 | 8.3 | 11.2 | 3.6 | 2.9 | 6.0 | 1.6 | | | | 3.8 | 8.1 | 43.7 | 50.6 |
| 4–6 Nov | Termometro Politico | 2,400 | 30.2 | 22.1 | 12.2 | 8.4 | 8.5 | 3.1 | 2.3 | 6.6 | 1.7 | 1.1 | 1.3 | | 2.5 1.0 – Peace Land Dignity; 1.5 – Others | 8.1 | 44.9 | 48.2 |
| 4–5 Nov | Eumetra | 800 | 30.9 | 21.9 | 12.7 | 8.3 | 8.6 | 3.3 | 2.6 | 6.6 | 1.7 | 1.0 | | | 2.4 | 9.0 | 45.5 | 48.8 |
| 29 Oct – 3 Nov | SWG | 1,200 | 31.4 | 21.9 | 12.6 | 8.2 | 8.0 | 3.1 | 2.5 | 6.6 | 1.7 | 1.0 | | | 2.7 | 9.5 | 45.3 | 48.6 |
| 26 Oct – 1 Nov | SWG | 1,200 | 31.3 | 22.2 | 12.7 | 7.9 | 7.9 | 3.3 | 2.4 | 6.9 | 1.5 | 1.2 | | | 2.7 | 9.1 | 45.7 | 48.3 |
| 30–31 Oct | Quorum | 800 | 29.4 | 20.6 | 13.6 | 7.7 | 9.0 | 4.5 | 2.0 | 6.5 | 1.6 | 1.1 | | | 4.0 | 8.8 | 44.3 | 47.2 |
| 27–30 Oct | Ipsos | 1,000 | 28.0 | 20.9 | 13.5 | 8.0 | 9.0 | 3.3 | 2.6 | 6.3 | 1.8 | 1.0 | | | 5.6 | 7.1 | 45.1 | 46 |
| 15–29 Oct | EMG Different | 1,000 | 29.0 | 21.3 | 13.1 | 8.8 | 9.3 | 2.9 | 2.4 | 5.6 | 1.9 | 1.3 | | | 4.4 | 7.7 | 44.3 | 48.4 |
| 22–27 Oct | SWG | 1,200 | 31.2 | 22.0 | 12.8 | 8.2 | 8.1 | 3.1 | 2.5 | 6.8 | 1.6 | 1.0 | | | 2.7 | 9.2 | 45.7 | 48.5 |
| 26 Oct | Giuseppe Conte is re-elected leader of the Five Star Movement | | | | | | | | | | | | | | | | | |
| 22–26 Oct | BiDiMedia | 1,000 | 29.3 | 22.4 | 12.3 | 8.3 | 8.2 | 2.9 | 2.5 | 6.7 | 1.2 | 0.8 | 1.0 | 0.6 | 3.8 | 9.2 | 45.1 | 46.6 |
| 21–22 Oct | Eumetra | 800 | 30.7 | 22.0 | 12.9 | 8.5 | 8.3 | 3.1 | 2.3 | 6.6 | 1.8 | 1.0 | | | 2.9 | 8.7 | 45.6 | 48.5 |
| 15–20 Oct | SWG | 1,200 | 31.0 | 22.1 | 13.2 | 8.5 | 7.9 | 2.9 | 2.3 | 6.6 | 1.8 | 1.0 | | | 2.7 | 8.9 | 46 | 48.4 |
| 15–19 Oct | BiDiMedia | 1,000 | 29.0 | 22.2 | 12.5 | 8.3 | 8.4 | 2.8 | 2.4 | 6.8 | 1.2 | 0.8 | 1.1 | 0.7 | 3.8 | 6.8 | 45.1 | 46.5 |
| 15–16 Oct | Termometro Politico | 3,000 | 29.8 | 22.0 | 12.1 | 8.6 | 8.6 | 3.1 | 2.4 | 6.4 | 1.8 | 1.1 | | | 3.6 | 7.8 | 44.7 | 48.1 |
| 14–15 Oct | Eumetra | 800 | 30.4 | 21.8 | 13.1 | 8.5 | 8.0 | 3.4 | 2.3 | 6.6 | 1.8 | 1.0 | | | 3.1 | 8.6 | 45.6 | 47.9 |
| 14–15 Oct | Eumetra | 800 | 30.4 | 21.8 | 13.1 | 8.5 | 8.0 | 3.4 | 2.3 | 6.6 | 1.8 | 1.0 | | | 3.1 | 8.6 | 45.6 | 47.9 |
| 13–14 Oct | Demopolis | 1,540 | 30.2 | 23.0 | 12.4 | 8.5 | 8.8 | 2.8 | 2.5 | 6.7 | | | | | | 7.2 | 44.6 | 47.5 |
| 12–13 Oct | Regional elections in Tuscany (CSX hold) | | | | | | | | | | | | | | | | | |
| 8–13 Oct | SWG | 1,200 | 30.8 | 21.8 | 13.4 | 8.7 | 7.8 | 3.1 | 2.4 | 6.8 | 1.9 | | | | 3.3 | 9.0 | 46.3 | 47.3 |
| 8–9 Oct | Termometro Politico | 2,600 | 29.6 | 21.9 | 12.4 | 8.6 | 8.9 | 3.0 | 2.2 | 6.6 | 1.7 | 1.0 | | | 4.1 | 7.7 | 44.8 | 48.1 |
| 7–8 Oct | Eumetra | 800 | 30.4 | 21.9 | 13.3 | 8.6 | 8.2 | 3.5 | 2.2 | 6.6 | 1.9 | 1.0 | | | 2.4 | 8.5 | 45.9 | 48.2 |
| 5–6 Oct | Regional elections in Calabria (CDX hold) | | | | | | | | | | | | | | | | | |
| 2–5 Oct | BiDiMedia | 1,000 | 28.8 | 22.0 | 13.0 | 8.5 | 8.2 | 3.2 | 2.2 | 7.0 | 1.3 | 1.0 | 1.0 | | 3.8 | 6.8 | 45.5 | 46.5 |
| 1–6 Oct | SWG | 1,200 | 30.8 | 21.9 | 13.6 | 8.8 | 8.0 | 3.0 | 2.2 | 6.8 | 1.8 | | | | 3.1 | 8.9 | 46.3 | 47.6 |
| 01–2 Oct | Termometro Politico | 2,800 | 29.8 | 22.0 | 12.5 | 8.6 | 8.8 | 3.1 | 2.3 | 6.5 | 1.8 | 1.0 | | | 2.5 | 7.8 | 45.1 | 48.2 |
| 17 Sep – 1 Oct | EMG | 1,000 | 28.1 | 21.6 | 13.1 | 8.4 | 9.6 | 3.2 | 2.5 | 5.9 | 2.2 | | | | 1.6 | 6.5 | 45.3 | 46.1 |
| 28–29 Sep | Regional elections in Marche (CDX hold) | | | | | | | | | | | | | | | | | |
| 24–29 Sep | SWG | 1,200 | 30.5 | 22.1 | 13.7 | 9.0 | 8.0 | 3.1 | 2.2 | 6.5 | 1.9 | | | | 3.0 | 8.4 | 46.4 | 47.5 |
| 28 Sep | Regional elections in Aosta Valley (UV-CDX hold) | | | | | | | | | | | | | | | | | |
| 22–26 Sep | Ixè | 1,000 | 29.2 | 22.0 | 14.1 | 8.2 | 9.3 | 3.1 | 2.2 | 6.1 | 2.4 | 1.1 | | | 2.3 | 7.2 | 46.8 | 47.8 |
| 23–25 Sep | Termometro Politico | 3,000 | 29.7 | 21.9 | 12.5 | 8.8 | 8.6 | 3.0 | 2.3 | 6.5 | 1.8 | 1.0 | 1.4 | | 2.5 1.0 – Peace Land Dignity; 1.5 – Others | 7.8 | 45.0 | 48.1 |
| 18–22 Sep | BiDiMedia | 1,000 | 28.4 | 22.3 | 12.7 | 8.5 | 8.4 | 3.1 | 2.1 | 7.0 | 1.4 | 1.0 | | | 5.1 | 6.1 | 45.5 | 46.3 |
| 17–22 Sep | SWG | 1,200 | 30.2 | 21.9 | 13.5 | 9.0 | 8.0 | 3.3 | 2.2 | 6.7 | 2.0 | | | | 3.2 | 8.3 | 46.3 | 47.2 |
| 16–18 Sep | Termometro Politico | 2,800 | 29.4 | 22.1 | 12.4 | 8.5 | 8.8 | 3.1 | 2.2 | 6.5 | 1.9 | 1.0 | | | 3.2 | 7.3 | 45.1 | 47.7 |
| 15–18 Sep | Demos & Pi | 1,028 | 29.8 | 21.7 | 13.2 | 8.6 | 8.4 | 3.2 | 2.3 | 6.1 | 2.0 | | | | 4.7 | 8.1 | 45.3 | 46.8 |
| 10–15 Sep | BiDiMedia | 1,000 | 28.1 | 22.3 | 12.6 | 8.7 | 8.4 | 3.1 | 1.9 | 6.9 | 1.3 | 0.9 | 1.1 | | 4.7 | 5.8 | 45 | 46.1 |
| 10–15 Sep | SWG | 1,200 | 30.4 | 21.9 | 13.3 | 8.7 | 8.1 | 3.4 | 2.4 | 6.6 | 2.1 | 1.0 | | | 2.1 | 8.5 | 46.3 | 48.2 |
| 9–11 Sep | Termometro Politico | 2,700 | 29.7 | 22.1 | 12.3 | 8.6 | 8.6 | 2.9 | 2.3 | 6.4 | 1.8 | 1.0 | | | 2.3 | 7.6 | 44.9 | 47.9 |
| 9–10 Sep | Eumetra | 1,200 | 29.6 | 22.0 | 13.5 | 8.4 | 8.2 | 4.0 | 2.2 | 6.8 | 1.8 | 1.0 | | | 2.5 | 7.6 | 46.3 | 47.2 |
| 3–8 Sep | SWG | 1,200 | 30.0 | 22.2 | 13.6 | 8.6 | 8.3 | 3.3 | 2.4 | 6.8 | 2.0 | 1.0 | | | 1.8 | 8.2 | 47 | 47.9 |
| 3–5 Sep | Quorum | 805 | 28.5 | 21.1 | 13.5 | 8.3 | 8.0 | 4.8 | 1.8 | 7.5 | 1.5 | 0.7 | | | 4.3 | 7.4 | 45.4 | 45.5 |
| 27 Aug – 1 Sep | SWG | 1,200 | 30.2 | 22.0 | 13.3 | 8.6 | 8.2 | 3.5 | 2.5 | 6.7 | 2.1 | 1.0 | | | 1.9 | 8.2 | 46.6 | 48 |
| 23–25 Aug | BiDiMedia | 1,000 | 28.8 | 22.5 | 12.9 | 8.6 | 8.3 | 2.6 | 1.5 | 7.0 | 1.3 | 0.9 | 1.0 | | 4.6 | 6.3 | 45.2 | 46.6 |
| 5–7 Aug | Termometro Politico | 2,800 | 29.1 | 22.1 | 12.3 | 8.5 | 8.8 | 3.0 | 2.4 | 6.6 | 1.8 | 1.1 | | | 1.9 | 7.0 | 45.2 | 47.5 |
| 29–31 Jul | Termometro Politico | 2,500 | 28.8 | 22.3 | 12.4 | 8.7 | 8.5 | 3.1 | 2.3 | 6.5 | 1.8 | 1.0 | | | 2.2 | 6.5 | 45.3 | 47 |
| 28–30 Jul | Demopolis | 2,000 | 30.2 | 22.5 | 12.0 | 8.8 | 8.8 | | | 6.3 | | | | | 3.4 | 7.7 | 40.8 | 47.8 |
| 25–30 Jul | Quorum | 800 | 28.5 | 22.1 | 13.4 | 8.3 | 8.4 | 4.1 | 2.3 | 6.9 | 1.7 | 0.6 | | | 3.7 | 6.4 | 46.4 | 45.8 |
| 21–29 Jul | Winpoll | 1,500 | 27.9 | 23.6 | 11.0 | 8.7 | 9.1 | 2.6 | 2.8 | 6.3 | 1.3 | 1.5 | | | 5.2 | 4.3 | 45 | 47.2 |
| 23–28 Jul | SWG | 1,200 | 29.9 | 22.4 | 13.4 | 8.4 | 8.1 | 3.3 | 2.6 | 6.7 | 2.1 | 1.0 | | | 2.1 | 7.5 | 47.2 | 47.4 |
| 21–24 Jul | Ipsos | 1,000 | 28.0 | 21.1 | 14.3 | 8.5 | 8.1 | 2.6 | 2.2 | 5.8 | 2.2 | 1.1 | | | 2.3 | 7.1 | 45.6 | 45.7 |
| 15–17 Jul | SWG | 1,200 | 29.9 | 22.7 | 13.0 | 8.4 | 7.9 | 3.5 | 2.4 | 6.9 | 2.0 | 1.0 | | | 2.3 | 7.2 | 47 | 47.2 |
| 15–17 Jul | Termometro Politico | 2,600 | 29.2 | 22.3 | 12.5 | 8.4 | 8.6 | 3.0 | 2.4 | 6.5 | 1.9 | 1.0 | 1.4 | | 2.8 | 6.9 | 45.6 | 47.2 |
| 11–14 Jul | Quorum | 800 | 28.1 | 22.1 | 12.7 | 8.2 | 8.9 | 3.6 | 2.0 | 7.3 | 2.1 | 0.3 | | | 4.7 | 6.0 | 46.2 | 45.5 |
| 9–14 Jul | SWG | 1,200 | 30.3 | 23.0 | 12.7 | 8.3 | 8.0 | 3.5 | 2.2 | 6.8 | 1.9 | | | | 3.3 | 7.3 | 46.6 | 46.6 |
| 8–10 Jul | Termometro Politico | 2,800 | 29.2 | 22.2 | 12.2 | 8.6 | 8.8 | 2.9 | 2.4 | 6.4 | 1.8 | 1.0 | | | 4.5 | 7.0 | 45 | 47.6 |
| 2–7 Jul | SWG | 1,200 | 30.1 | 22.8 | 12.6 | 8.2 | 8.1 | 3.7 | 2.2 | 6.8 | 1.9 | | | | 3.6 | 7.3 | 46.3 | 46.4 |
| 2–3 Jul | Termometro Politico | 2,600 | 29.4 | 22.0 | 12.4 | 8.4 | 8.5 | 3.0 | 2.3 | 6.6 | 1.9 | 1.1 | 1.5 | | 2.9 | 7.4 | 45.2 | 47.4 |
| 25–30 Jun | SWG | 1,200 | 30.3 | 23.0 | 12.3 | 8.2 | 8.3 | 3.8 | 2.0 | 6.6 | 1.7 | | | | 4.0 | 7.3 | 45.6 | 46.8 |
| 19–30 Jun | Winpoll | 1,500 | 27.6 | 23.9 | 11.3 | 9.0 | 8.8 | 3.5 | 2.7 | 6.6 | 1.0 | | | | 5.6 | 3.7 | 45.5 | 45.4 |
| 24–26 Jun | Ipsos | 1,000 | 28.2 | 21.4 | 13.3 | 8.8 | 8.4 | 3.0 | 2.0 | 6.0 | 1.7 | 1.0 | | | 6.2 | 6.8 | 44.4 | 46.4 |
| 20–26 Jun | Ixè | 1,000 | 28.2 | 21.7 | 13.7 | 8.6 | 8.8 | 3.8 | 1.8 | 6.4 | 2.3 | 0.9 | | | 3.8 | 6.5 | 45.9 | 46.5 |
| 17–19 Jun | Termometro Politico | 2,900 | 29.7 | 22.3 | 12.0 | 8.3 | 8.9 | 2.7 | 2.4 | 6.3 | 2.0 | 1.2 | | | 3.1 | 7.4 | 45 | 48.1 |
| 18–23 Jun | SWG | 1,200 | 30.6 | 23.0 | 12.4 | 8.2 | 8.1 | 3.6 | 2.1 | 6.5 | 1.5 | 1.0 | | | 3.0 | 7.6 | 45.5 | 47.9 |
| 11–16 Jun | SWG | 1,200 | 30.4 | 23.3 | 12.3 | 8.1 | 8.3 | 3.4 | 2.3 | 6.7 | 1.5 | 1.0 | | | 2.7 | 7.1 | 46.1 | 47.8 |
| 12–13 Jun | Quorum | 802 | 28.4 | 22.2 | 11.9 | 8.3 | 8.9 | 3.2 | 1.8 | 6.9 | 2.0 | 0.4 | | | 6.0 | 6.2 | 44.8 | 46 |
| 10–12 Jun | Termometro Politico | 3,500 | 29.8 | 22.1 | 12.0 | 8.6 | 8.7 | 2.8 | 2.3 | 6.3 | 1.9 | 1.0 | | | 2.4 | 7.7 | 44.6 | 48.1 |
| 10–11 Jun | Eumetra | 800 | 30.2 | 23.1 | 12.8 | 8.4 | 8.3 | 3.4 | 2.5 | 6.3 | 1.5 | 1.0 | | | 2.9 | 7.1 | 46.2 | 47.9 |
| 8–9 Jun | Abrogative referendums (quorum not reached); runoff of 25–26 May local elections | | | | | | | | | | | | | | | | | |
| 4–9 Jun | SWG | 1,200 | 30.7 | 23.4 | 12.5 | 7.9 | 8.0 | 3.4 | 2.5 | 6.5 | 1.4 | 1.0 | | | 2.7 | 7.3 | 46.3 | 47.6 |
| 6–6 Jun | EMG | — | 29.0 | 23.3 | 12.1 | 8.2 | 9.3 | 3.0 | 2.3 | 6.5 | 1.6 | 1.4 | | | 3.3 | 5.7 | 45.8 | 47.9 |
| 3–3 Jun | Noto | — | 30.5 | 22.5 | 12.5 | 8.5 | 9.0 | 3.5 | 2.5 | 6.0 | 1.5 | 1.5 | | | 2.0 | 8.0 | 45 | 49.5 |
| 1–5 Jun | BiDiMedia | 1,000 | 28.9 | 23.1 | 12.5 | 8.9 | 8.3 | 2.8 | 2.2 | 6.4 | 1.4 | 0.9 | 1.3 | | 5.9 | 5.8 | 45.6 | 47 |
| 3–4 Jun | Eumetra | 800 | 30.0 | 22.8 | 12.7 | 8.4 | 8.3 | 3.2 | 2.5 | 6.2 | 1.7 | 1.0 | | | 3.2 | 7.2 | 45.9 | 47.7 |
| 28 May – 2 Jun | SWG | 1,200 | 30.5 | 23.1 | 12.4 | 8.2 | 8.1 | 3.3 | 2.5 | 6.4 | 1.5 | 1.1 | | | 2.9 | 7.4 | 45.9 | 47.9 |
| 30–30 May | EMG | — | 28.6 | 23.7 | 11.8 | 8.4 | 9.5 | 3.2 | 2.4 | 6.3 | 1.8 | 1.3 | | | 3.0 | 4.9 | 46 | 47.8 |
| 27–29 May | Ipsos | 1,000 | 27.3 | 22.3 | 14.6 | 7.8 | 7.8 | 3.0 | 2.0 | 5.9 | 1.8 | 1.0 | | | 6.5 | 5.0 | 46.6 | 43.9 |
| 27 May | Euromedia | | 30.1 | 22.1 | 12.1 | 8.9 | 9.0 | 3.0 | 2.9 | 6.1 | 2.4 | 1.0 | | | 2.4 | 8.0 | 45.6 | 49 |
| 25–26 May | Local elections | | | | | | | | | | | | | | | | | |
| 21–26 May | SWG | 1,200 | 30.5 | 22.8 | 12.4 | 8.4 | 8.0 | 3.2 | 2.6 | 6.5 | 1.7 | 1.2 | | | 2.7 | 7.7 | 46 | 48.1 |
| 22 May | Demopolis | | 29.5 | 23.0 | 12.0 | 8.6 | 8.9 | 2.7 | 2.5 | 6.5 | 1.8 | 1.2 | 1.4 | | | 6.5 | 45.8 | 48.2 |
| 21–22 May | Termometro Politico | 2,700 | 30.0 | 21.9 | 12.1 | 8.5 | 8.5 | 2.8 | 2.5 | 6.5 | 1.8 | 1.2 | | | 4.2 | 8.1 | 44.8 | 48.2 |
| 20–21 May | Eumetra | 800 | 30.2 | 22.1 | 12.5 | 8.6 | 8.5 | 3.6 | 2.6 | 6.4 | 1.8 | 1.0 | | | 2.7 | 8.1 | 45.4 | 48.3 |
| 14–19 May | SWG | 1,200 | 30.3 | 22.5 | 12.4 | 8.4 | 8.3 | 3.3 | 2.7 | 6.7 | 1.6 | 1.0 | | | 4.5 | 7.8 | 45.9 | 48 |
| 14–15 May | Tecnè | — | 30.0 | 21.4 | 12.1 | 8.2 | 11.2 | 3.5 | 2.1 | 6.1 | 1.6 | | | | 3.8 | 8.6 | 43.3 | 49.4 |
| 14–15 May | Demos & Pi | 1,009 | 29.3 | 22.0 | 12.5 | 8.7 | 8.6 | 3.8 | 2.5 | 5.8 | 2.3 | | | | 4.5 | 7.3 | 45.1 | 46.6 |
| 13–14 May | Eumetra | 800 | 30.3 | 21.9 | 12.4 | 8.9 | 8.7 | 3.5 | 2.7 | 6.3 | 1.7 | 1.0 | | | 2.6 | 8.4 | 45 | 48.9 |
| 13 May | Noto | | 31.0 | 21.5 | 13.0 | 8.5 | 9.0 | 3.0 | 2.5 | 6.5 | 1.5 | 1.5 | | | 2.5 | 9.5 | 45 | 50 |
| 7–12 May | SWG | 1,200 | 30.4 | 22.4 | 12.0 | 8.6 | 8.5 | 3.5 | 2.9 | 6.5 | 1.6 | 1.0 | | | 2.6 | 8.0 | 45.4 | 48.5 |
| 7–8 May | Tecnè | 1,003 | 29.8 | 21.6 | 12.0 | 8.3 | 11.3 | 3.4 | 2.0 | 6.0 | 1.7 | | | | 3.9 | 8.2 | 43.3 | 49.4 |
| 30 Apr – 5 May | SWG | 1,200 | 30.1 | 22.5 | 12.2 | 8.6 | 8.4 | 3.5 | 2.8 | 6.4 | 1.7 | 1.0 | | | 2.8 | 7.6 | 45.6 | 48.1 |
| 30 Apr | Demopolis | | 29.0 | 23.0 | 11.6 | 8.9 | 9.0 | 2.6 | 2.5 | 6.4 | 1.7 | 1.6 | | | | 6.0 | 45.2 | 48.5 |
| 30 Apr | Euromedia | | 30.6 | 22.0 | 11.0 | 8.7 | 9.2 | 3.1 | 2.7 | 6.0 | 1.8 | 1.0 | | | 3.9 | 8.6 | 43.5 | 49.5 |
| 29–30 Apr | Eumetra | 800 | 30.1 | 21.8 | 12.6 | 9.1 | 8.9 | 3.5 | 2.6 | 6.2 | 1.8 | 1.1 | | | 2.3 | 8.3 | 45 | 49.2 |
| 24 Apr | Ipsos | — | 27.7 | 21.1 | 13.9 | 8.2 | 8.2 | 2.8 | 2.5 | 5.8 | 1.8 | 1.0 | | | 6.6 | 6.6 | 45.1 | 45.1 |
| 23–28 Apr | SWG | 1,200 | 30.3 | 22.0 | 12.4 | 8.8 | 8.7 | 3.4 | 2.7 | 6.2 | 1.7 | 1.0 | | | 2.8 | 8.3 | 45 | 48.8 |
| 22–24 Apr | Tecnè | 1,000 | 30.0 | 21.7 | 12.0 | 8.3 | 11.5 | 3.3 | 2.0 | 5.8 | 1.7 | | | | 3.7 | 8.3 | 43.2 | 49.8 |
| 22–23 Apr | Eumetra | 800 | 29.9 | 22.0 | 12.4 | 9.0 | 9.1 | 3.4 | 2.6 | 6.1 | 1.8 | 1.0 | | | 2.7 | 7.9 | 44.9 | 49 |
| 17–23 Apr | Ixè | 1,000 | 28.6 | 21.8 | 13.1 | 8.8 | 9.2 | 3.5 | 1.8 | 6.7 | 2.2 | 1.0 | | | 3.3 | 6.8 | 45.6 | 47.6 |
| 16–21 Apr | SWG | 1,200 | 30.0 | 21.8 | 12.3 | 8.9 | 8.9 | 3.5 | 2.8 | 6.4 | 1.7 | | | | 3.7 | 8.2 | 45 | 47.8 |
| 16–17 Apr | Tecnè | 1,001 | 29.9 | 22.0 | 11.8 | 8.3 | 11.4 | 3.2 | 2.1 | 5.6 | 1.8 | | | | 3.9 | 7.9 | 43.3 | 49.6 |
| 16 Apr | Noto | — | 31.0 | 22.0 | 13.0 | 9.0 | 8.5 | 3.0 | 2.5 | 5.5 | 2.0 | 1.5 | | | 2.0 | 9.0 | 45 | 50 |
| 9–14 Apr | SWG | 1,200 | 30.0 | 22.0 | 12.5 | 8.7 | 8.8 | 3.6 | 2.7 | 6.4 | 1.9 | | | | 3.4 | 8.0 | 45.5 | 47.5 |
| 9–10 Apr | Tecnè | 1,000 | 29.7 | 22.1 | 11.6 | 8.4 | 11.5 | 3.0 | 2.2 | 5.8 | 1.8 | | | | 3.9 | 7.6 | 43.5 | 49.6 |
| 8–9 Apr | Eumetra | 800 | 29.8 | 22.3 | 12.3 | 9.0 | 9.0 | 3.4 | 2.4 | 6.1 | 1.8 | 1.0 | | | 2.9 | 7.5 | 44.9 | 48.8 |
| 8 Apr | Euromedia | | 29.6 | 22.5 | 12.0 | 9.5 | 9.4 | 3.6 | 2.6 | 6.1 | 1.7 | 1.0 | | | 2.0 | 7.1 | 44.9 | 49.5 |
| 2–7 Apr | SWG | 1,200 | 30.2 | 22.3 | 12.2 | 8.7 | 8.9 | 3.8 | 2.5 | 6.2 | 1.8 | | | | 3.4 | 7.9 | 45 | 47.8 |
| 5–6 Apr | Matteo Salvini is re-elected secretary of Lega | | | | | | | | | | | | | | | | | |
| 2–4 Apr | Quorum | 806 | 28.1 | 22.4 | 12.0 | 7.7 | 9.2 | 3.7 | 2.3 | 5.7 | 2.2 | 0.8 | | | 5.9 | 5.7 | 44.6 | 45.8 |
| 2–3 Apr | Tecnè | | 29.7 | 22.3 | 11.3 | 8.3 | 11.5 | 2.9 | 2.1 | 6.0 | 1.9 | | | | 4.0 | 7.4 | 43.6 | 49.5 |
| 1–2 Apr | Eumetra | 800 | 29.5 | 22.4 | 12.3 | 8.9 | 9.0 | 3.0 | 2.5 | 6.0 | 2.0 | 1.1 | | | 3.3 | 7.1 | 45.2 | 48.5 |
| 26–31 Mar | SWG | 1,200 | 29.8 | 22.5 | 11.9 | 8.4 | 9.1 | 3.9 | 2.6 | 6.0 | 2.0 | | | | 2.8 | 7.3 | 45 | 47.3 |
| 29–30 Mar | Carlo Calenda is re-elected secretary of Action in leadership election | | | | | | | | | | | | | | | | | |
| 27 Mar | Noto | | 30.5 | 22.5 | 12.0 | 9.5 | 9.0 | 3.0 | 2.5 | 5.5 | 2.0 | 2.0 | | | 1.5 | 8.0 | 44.5 | 51 |
| 26–27 Mar | Tecnè | | 29.7 | 22.3 | 11.5 | 8.2 | 11.5 | 3.0 | 2.2 | 5.9 | 1.8 | | | | 3.9 | 7.4 | 43.7 | 49.4 |
| 26–27 Mar | Termometro Politico | 2,900 | 29.0 | 22.2 | 11.7 | 8.9 | 8.7 | 2.9 | 2.4 | 6.2 | 2.0 | 1.2 | 1.4 | | 3.4 | 6.8 | 44.5 | 47.8 |
| 25–27 Mar | Ipsos | 1,000 | 26.6 | 21.5 | 13.8 | 9.0 | 8.4 | 2.7 | 2.3 | 6.3 | 2.0 | 1.0 | | | 6.4 | 5.1 | 45.9 | 45 |
| 25–26 Mar | Demopolis | 2,000 | 29.5 | 23.2 | 11.4 | 9.0 | 9.0 | 2.6 | 2.3 | 6.4 | 1.6 | 1.0 | | | | 6.3 | 44.9 | 48.5 |
| 17–26 Mar | Winpoll | 1,600 | 27.4 | 24.6 | 11.0 | 8.5 | 8.3 | 2.8 | 2.9 | 7.0 | 2.0 | | | | 5.5 | 2.8 | 47.5 | 44.2 |
| 24–25 Mar | Piepoli | 500 | 30.0 | 22.0 | 12.5 | 8.0 | 9.0 | 2.5 | 3.0 | 6.5 | 2.0 | 1.0 | | | 1.5 | 8.0 | 46 | 48 |
| 19–24 Mar | SWG | 1,200 | 29.7 | 22.4 | 12.2 | 8.4 | 9.3 | 3.6 | 2.4 | 6.2 | 1.8 | 1.0 | | | 3.0 | 7.3 | 45 | 48.4 |
| 23 Mar | Lab2101 | 1,000 | 30.0 | 21.1 | 11.2 | 8.7 | 8.4 | 3.4 | 2.8 | 5.5 | 2.5 | 1.5 | | | 4.2 | 8.9 | 43.1 | 48.6 |
| 22 Mar | Tecnè | 1,000 | 29.7 | 22.5 | 11.3 | 8.0 | 11.4 | 2.9 | 2.3 | 6.1 | 1.9 | | | | 3.9 | 7.2 | 44.1 | 49.1 |
| 19–20 Mar | Termometro Politico | 3,100 | 29.1 | 22.1 | 11.9 | 8.7 | 8.7 | 3.0 | 2.3 | 6.4 | 1.9 | 1.3 | 1.4 | | 3.2 | 7.0 | 44.6 | 47.8 |
| 17–19 Mar | Piepoli | 500 | 29.5 | 22.5 | 12.5 | 8.0 | 9.0 | 2.5 | 3.0 | 6.5 | 2.0 | 1.0 | | | 1.5 | 7.0 | 46.5 | 47.5 |
| 18 Mar | Euromedia | 1,000 | 30.0 | 23.4 | 11.9 | 9.3 | 9.1 | 2.8 | 2.5 | 5.8 | 1.8 | 0.9 | | | 4.2 | 6.6 | 45.4 | 49.3 |
| 12–17 Mar | SWG | 1,200 | 30.0 | 22.7 | 12.2 | 8.0 | 9.1 | 3.5 | 2.2 | 6.3 | 1.9 | 1.1 | | | 3.0 | 7.3 | 45.3 | 48.2 |
| 15 Mar | Lab2101 | 1,000 | 30.1 | 21.3 | 11.1 | 8.6 | 8.3 | 3.5 | 2.9 | 5.6 | 2.4 | 1.6 | | | 3.9 | 8.8 | 43.3 | 48.6 |
| 12–13 Mar | Termometro Politico | 3,000 | 29.1 | 22.1 | 11.7 | 8.6 | 8.8 | 3.0 | 2.3 | 6.2 | 1.9 | 1.3 | 1.5 | | 3.5 | 7.0 | 44.2 | 47.8 |
| 12–13 Mar | Tecnè | 1,000 | 29.9 | 22.2 | 11.4 | 8.0 | 11.5 | 2.8 | 2.2 | 6.2 | 2.0 | | | | 3.8 | 7.7 | 44 | 49.4 |
| 11 Mar | Noto | 1,000 | 30.5 | 23.0 | 11.5 | 9.0 | 8.5 | 3.0 | 2.5 | 6.0 | 2.0 | 2.0 | | | 2.0 | 7.5 | 45 | 50 |
| 5–10 Mar | SWG | 1,200 | 30.2 | 22.4 | 12.4 | 8.0 | 9.2 | 3.5 | 2.4 | 6.3 | 2.0 | 1.0 | | | 2.6 | 7.8 | 45.5 | 48.4 |
| 8 Mar | Lab2101 | 1,000 | 30.2 | 21.2 | 10.9 | 8.6 | 8.2 | 3.5 | 3.0 | 5.5 | 2.3 | 1.6 | | | 4.3 | 9.0 | 42.9 | 48.6 |
| 8 Mar | Former Italia Viva deputy Luigi Marattin founds the Liberal Democratic Party | | | | | | | | | | | | | | | | | |
| 6–7 Mar | Quorum | 804 | 28.2 | 23.1 | 11.6 | 8.5 | 9.0 | 3.0 | 1.9 | 6.0 | 2.2 | 0.9 | | Did not exist | 5.6 | 5.1 | 44.8 | 46.6 |
| 6 Mar | Euromedia | 1,000 | 29.8 | 23.0 | 11.8 | 8.7 | 9.1 | 2.8 | 2.5 | 5.5 | 2.1 | 0.9 | | Did not exist | 3.8 | 6.8 | 44.9 | 48.5 |
| 5–6 Mar | Tecnè | 1,000 | 29.8 | 22.4 | 11.3 | 8.1 | 11.3 | 2.8 | 2.3 | 6.1 | 2.0 | | 1.5 | Did not exist | 3.9 | 7.4 | 44.1 | 49.2 |
| 5–6 Mar | Termometro Politico | 2,900 | 29.3 | 22.3 | 11.5 | 8.8 | 8.7 | 3.0 | 2.4 | 6.2 | 1.9 | 1.2 | 1.3 | Did not exist | 3.4 | 7.0 | 44.3 | 48 |
| 4–5 Mar | Eumetra | 800 | 29.6 | 22.8 | 12.0 | 8.4 | 9.4 | 3.0 | 2.6 | 6.3 | 2.0 | 1.2 | | Did not exist | 2.7 | 6.8 | 45.7 | 48.6 |
| 26 Feb – 3 Mar | SWG | 1,200 | 30.0 | 22.5 | 12.0 | 8.3 | 9.4 | 3.4 | 2.6 | 6.5 | 1.8 | 1.0 | | Did not exist | 2.5 | 7.5 | 45.4 | 48.7 |
| 28 Feb | EMG | | 30.3 | 23.6 | 11.6 | 8.6 | 9.1 | 2.4 | 2.5 | 6.2 | 1.8 | 1.3 | | Did not exist | 2.6 | 6.7 | 45.7 | 49.3 |
| 25–27 Feb | Ipsos | 1,000 | 27.0 | 22.6 | 13.2 | 8.1 | 8.2 | 2.3 | 2.3 | 6.0 | 2.2 | 1.2 | | Did not exist | 6.9 | 4.4 | 46.3 | 44.5 |
| 26–27 Feb | Termometro Politico | 3,000 | 29.3 | 22.4 | 11.6 | 8.6 | 8.6 | 2.9 | 2.5 | 6.1 | 1.9 | 1.2 | 1.2 | Did not exist | 3.7 | 6.9 | 44.5 | 47.7 |
| 26–27 Feb | Tecnè | 1,001 | 29.8 | 22.3 | 11.3 | 8.2 | 11.3 | 2.9 | 2.5 | 6.0 | 1.9 | | | Did not exist | 3.8 | 7.6 | 44 | 49.3 |
| 21–27 Feb | Ixè | 1,000 | 30.4 | 21.9 | 12.3 | 8.2 | 8.6 | 3.3 | 1.9 | 7.6 | 2.4 | 1.0 | | Did not exist | 2.4 | 8.5 | 46.1 | 48.2 |
| 25–26 Feb | Eumetra | 800 | 30.1 | 22.9 | 11.8 | 8.3 | 9.3 | 2.9 | 2.8 | 6.3 | 1.9 | 1.1 | | Did not exist | 2.6 | 7.2 | 45.7 | 48.8 |
| 17–26 Feb | Winpoll | 1,500 | 27.6 | 24.4 | 10.7 | 8.4 | 8.3 | 2.7 | 2.7 | 7.1 | 1.6 | | | Did not exist | 6.5 | 3.2 | 46.5 | 44.3 |
| 25 Feb | Noto | | 30.5 | 23.5 | 12.5 | 8.5 | 8.0 | 2.5 | 2.5 | 5.5 | 1.5 | 2.0 | | Did not exist | 3.0 | 7.0 | 45.5 | 49 |
| 24–25 Feb | Piepoli | 500 | 29.5 | 23.0 | 12.0 | 9.0 | 9.0 | 3.0 | 3.0 | 6.5 | 2.0 | 1.0 | | Did not exist | 3.0 | 6.5 | 46.5 | 48.5 |
| 19–24 Feb | SWG | 1,200 | 30.2 | 22.2 | 12.2 | 8.0 | 9.2 | 3.2 | 2.8 | 6.5 | 1.9 | 1.1 | | Did not exist | 2.7 | 8.0 | 45.6 | 48.5 |
| 19–20 Feb | Tecnè | 1,000 | 29.6 | 22.5 | 11.2 | 8.3 | 11.4 | 2.8 | 2.4 | 5.9 | 2.0 | | | Did not exist | 3.9 | 7.1 | 44 | 49.3 |
| 18–19 Feb | EMG | 1,185 | 30.0 | 23.8 | 11.4 | 8.7 | 9.2 | 2.3 | 2.6 | 5.9 | 1.9 | 1.3 | | Did not exist | 3.0 | 6.2 | 45.6 | 49.2 |
| 18–20 Feb | Termometro Politico | 2,800 | 29.5 | 22.3 | 11.4 | 8.6 | 8.7 | 2.8 | 2.4 | 6.3 | 2.0 | 1.2 | 1.3 | Did not exist | 3.5 | 7.2 | 44.4 | 48 |
| 17–20 Feb | BiDiMedia | 1,200 | 28.9 | 23.8 | 11.1 | 8.2 | 8.8 | 2.7 | 2.2 | 6.4 | 1.7 | 0.9 | 1.4 | Did not exist | 3.9 | 5.1 | 45.2 | 46.8 |
| 18–19 Feb | Eumetra | 800 | 29.9 | 22.9 | 11.5 | 8.6 | 9.2 | 3.0 | 2.8 | 6.2 | 2.1 | 0.9 | | Did not exist | 2.9 | 7.0 | 45.5 | 48.6 |
| 14–16 Feb | Euromedia Research | 1,000 | 30.5 | 23.5 | 11.5 | 8.7 | 9.3 | 3.0 | 2.8 | 5.7 | 1.8 | 0.7 | | Did not exist | 2.5 | 7.0 | 45.3 | 49.2 |
| 13–14 Feb | Tecnè | 1,002 | 29.5 | 22.7 | 11.0 | 8.4 | 11.3 | 2.7 | 2.5 | 6.0 | 1.9 | | | Did not exist | 4.0 | 6.8 | 44.1 | 49.2 |
| 12–17 Feb | SWG | 1,200 | 29.8 | 22.0 | 11.9 | 8.2 | 9.3 | 3.1 | 3.0 | 6.6 | 2.1 | 1.0 | | Did not exist | 3.0 | 7.8 | 45.6 | 48.3 |
| 12–13 Feb | Termometro Politico | 2,700 | 29.7 | 22.4 | 11.3 | 8.6 | 8.6 | 2.7 | 2.5 | 6.5 | 2.0 | 1.2 | 1.2 | Did not exist | 3.3 | 7.3 | 44.7 | 48.1 |
| 12–14 Feb | Lab2101 | 1,000 | 30.4 | 21.6 | 10.7 | 8.6 | 8.4 | 3.3 | 2.9 | 5.5 | 2.1 | 0.6 | | Did not exist | 5.9 | 8.8 | 42.8 | 48 |
| 12–13 Feb | EMG | 1,121 | 30.2 | 23.6 | 11.6 | 8.9 | 8.9 | 2.2 | 2.7 | 5.8 | 2.0 | 1.3 | | Did not exist | 2.8 | 6.6 | 45.7 | 49.3 |
| 10–14 Feb | Demos & Pi | 1,004 | 29.5 | 22.8 | 11.4 | 8.7 | 9.0 | 3.3 | 2.6 | 6.2 | 2.2 | | | Did not exist | 4.3 | 6.7 | 45.2 | 47.2 |
| 9–12 Feb | Piepoli | 500 | 30.0 | 23.5 | 11.5 | 8.5 | 9.0 | 2.5 | 2.5 | 6.0 | 1.0 | 1.5 | | Did not exist | 4.0 | 6.5 | 44.5 | 49 |
| 7–9 Feb | Riccardo Magi is re-elected secretary of More Europe in leadership election | | | | | | | | | | | | | Did not exist | | | | |
| 6–7 Feb | Quorum | 804 | 29.2 | 22.8 | 11.4 | 8.0 | 8.8 | 2.9 | 2.3 | 6.4 | 2.4 | 0.7 | | Did not exist | 5.1 | 6.4 | 45.3 | 46.7 |
| 5–10 Feb | SWG | 1,200 | 29.5 | 22.3 | 11.8 | 8.5 | 9.2 | 3.1 | 2.9 | 6.7 | 1.9 | 1.1 | | Did not exist | 3.0 | 7.2 | 45.6 | 48.3 |
| 6–7 Feb | Tecnè | 1,000 | 29.7 | 22.9 | 10.8 | 8.5 | 11.4 | 2.6 | 2.4 | 5.8 | 2.0 | | | Did not exist | 3.9 | 6.8 | 43.9 | 49.6 |
| 4–5 Feb | EMG | 1,135 | 30.6 | 24.0 | 11.3 | 8.9 | 8.6 | 2.2 | 2.7 | 6.0 | 1.8 | 1.4 | | Did not exist | 2.5 | 6.6 | 45.8 | 49.5 |
| 4–5 Feb | Eumetra | 800 | 29.5 | 23.2 | 11.4 | 8.6 | 9.1 | 2.6 | 2.6 | 6.0 | 1.9 | 1.0 | | Did not exist | 4.1 | 6.3 | 45.1 | 48.2 |
| 2–3 Feb | Noto | 1,000 | 30.5 | 24.0 | 11.5 | 8.5 | 8.5 | 2.5 | 2.5 | 5.5 | 1.5 | 2.0 | | Did not exist | 3.0 | 6.5 | 45 | 49.5 |
| 29 Jan – 3 Feb | SWG | 1,200 | 29.5 | 22.6 | 11.8 | 8.3 | 9.1 | 3.1 | 2.9 | 6.5 | 2.1 | 1.2 | | Did not exist | 2.9 | 6.9 | 45.9 | 48.1 |
| 28–30 Jan | Ipsos | 1,000 | 27.8 | 22.8 | 12.5 | 8.5 | 8.5 | 2.0 | 2.5 | 5.8 | 2.0 | 1.0 | | Did not exist | 6.6 | 5.0 | 45.6 | 45.8 |
| 28–29 Jan | Eumetra | 800 | 29.6 | 23.0 | 11.3 | 8.5 | 9.3 | 3.0 | 2.5 | 6.2 | 1.9 | 1.2 | | Did not exist | 3.5 | 6.6 | 44.9 | 48.6 |
| 29–31 Jan | Lab2101 | 1,000 | 30.8 | 21.4 | 10.7 | 8.7 | 8.4 | 3.2 | 2.9 | 5.8 | 2.4 | 0.6 | | Did not exist | 5.1 | 9.4 | 43.2 | 48.5 |
| 27–28 Jan | Demopolis | 2,000 | 30.0 | 24.0 | 11.2 | 8.7 | 9.3 | 2.5 | 2.2 | 6.5 | 1.6 | | | Did not exist | 4.0 | 6.0 | 45.5 | 48 |
| 22–27 Jan | SWG | 1,200 | 29.7 | 22.8 | 11.4 | 8.4 | 9.1 | 3.2 | 2.8 | 6.5 | 2.0 | 1.3 | | Did not exist | 2.8 | 7.1 | 45.5 | 48.5 |
| 23–24 Jan | Tecnè | 1,001 | 29.5 | 23.0 | 10.6 | 8.5 | 11.3 | 2.8 | 2.2 | 6.1 | 2.0 | | | Did not exist | 4.0 | 6.5 | 43.9 | 49.3 |
| 21–22 Jan | EMG | 1,013 | 30.7 | 24.1 | 11.1 | 9.0 | 8.4 | 2.1 | 2.6 | 6.1 | 1.7 | 1.4 | | Did not exist | 2.8 | 6.6 | 45.6 | 49.5 |
| 14–15 Jan | EMG | 1,165 | 30.4 | 23.9 | 10.8 | 8.9 | 8.6 | 2.7 | 2.0 | 6.3 | 1.7 | 1.3 | | Did not exist | 3.4 | 6.5 | 44.7 | 49.2 |
| 8–13 Jan | SWG | 1,200 | 29.8 | 22.2 | 11.6 | 8.3 | 9.1 | 3.3 | 2.7 | 6.6 | 2.0 | 1.0 | | Did not exist | 3.4 1.0 – South calls North; 2.4 – Others | 7.6 | 45.1 | 48.2 |
| 9–10 Jan | Quorum | 1,203 | 28.3 | 23.3 | 11.5 | 8.2 | 9.3 | 2.9 | 2.0 | 6.3 | 2.0 | 1.0 | | Did not exist | 5.2 | 5.0 | 45.1 | 46.8 |
| 9–10 Jan | Tecnè | 1,000 | 29.8 | 23.3 | 10.4 | 8.8 | 11.5 | 2.6 | 2.0 | 6.1 | 1.8 | | | Did not exist | 3.7 | 6.5 | 43.6 | 50.1 |
| 0–9 Jan | Euromedia Research | 1,000 | 31.5 | 24.3 | 10.0 | 9.0 | 9.2 | 2.6 | 1.9 | 5.3 | 2.0 | 0.6 | | Did not exist | 3.6 | 7.2 | 43.5 | 50.3 |
| 8–9 Jan | Termometro Politico | 2,600 | 29.4 | 23.1 | 11.0 | 8.6 | 8.2 | 2.6 | 2.3 | 6.5 | 1.8 | 1.2 | 1.4 | Did not exist | 3.9 1.3 – Peace Land Dignity; 0.6 – South calls North; 1.5 – Others | 6.4 | 44.7 | 47.4 |
| 7–8 Jan | Eumetra | 800 | 28.6 | 23.0 | 11.5 | 8.8 | 9.4 | 2.7 | 2.3 | 6.3 | 2.2 | 1.0 | | Did not exist | 4.2 | 5.6 | 45.3 | 47.8 |
| 2–6 Jan | SWG | 1,200 | 29.1 | 22.5 | 11.4 | 8.6 | 9.4 | 3.3 | 2.5 | 6.5 | 2.1 | 1.1 | | Did not exist | 3.5 1.0 – South calls North; 2.5 – Others | 6.6 | 45 | 48.2 |

=== 2024 ===
| Polling | | | Parties | | | | | | | | | | | | | | Coalitions | |
| Fieldwork date | Polling firm | Sample size | FdI | PD | M5S | Lega | FI | A | IV | AVS | +E | PTD | NM | ScN (Note: Some polls refer to it as Freedom.) | Others | Lead | CSX | CDX |
|---|---|---|---|---|---|---|---|---|---|---|---|---|---|---|---|---|---|---|
| 19–20 Dec | Tecnè | 998 | 28.6 | 23.7 | 10.7 | 8.8 | 11.4 | 2.7 | 2.2 | 6.2 | 1.8 | | | | 3.9 | 4.9 | 44.6 | 48.8 |
| 18–23 Dec | SWG | 1,200 | 29.1 | 22.2 | 11.5 | 8.8 | 9.1 | 3.2 | 2.7 | 6.7 | 1.9 | | 1.2 | 1.0 | 2.6 | 6.9 | 45 | 48.2 |
| 18–20 Dec | Ipsos | 1,000 | 27.6 | 22.5 | 13.3 | 8.6 | 8.1 | 2.0 | 2.0 | 6.0 | 2.3 | | 1.0 | 1.0 | 5.6 | 5.0 | 46.1 | 45.3 |
| 18–19 Dec | Termometro Politico | 2,800 | 29.6 | 22.7 | 10.6 | 8.8 | 8.4 | 2.7 | 2.4 | 6.7 | 1.8 | 1.3 | 1.1 | 0.6 | 2.9 | 6.9 | 44.2 | 47.9 |
| 12–20 Dec | Winpoll | 1,500 | 28.2 | 25.6 | 10.8 | 9.3 | 7.3 | 2.7 | 2.4 | 7.6 | 2.4 | 1.6 | | | 2.1 | 2.6 | 48.8 | 44.8 |
| 11–16 Dec | SWG | 1,200 | 29.3 | 22.2 | 11.2 | 8.4 | 9.4 | 3.1 | 2.5 | 6.9 | 2.0 | | 1.1 | 1.0 | 2.9 | 7.1 | 44.8 | 48.2 |
| 12–13 Dec | Demopolis | 2,000 | 29.5 | 24.0 | 11.8 | 8.7 | 9.0 | 2.4 | 2.0 | 6.4 | | | | | | 5.5 | 44.2 | 47.2 |
| 12–13 Dec | Tecnè | 1,000 | 28.7 | 23.8 | 10.9 | 8.6 | 11.4 | 2.5 | 2.2 | 6.1 | 1.9 | | | | 3.9 | 4.9 | 44.9 | 48.7 |
| 11–12 Dec | Termometro Politico | 2,800 | 29.5 | 23.0 | 10.9 | 9.0 | 8.2 | 2.8 | 2.3 | 6.6 | 1.8 | 1.3 | 1.1 | 0.6 | 2.9 | 6.5 | 44.6 | 47.8 |
| 10–11 Dec | Eumetra | 800 | 28.8 | 23.2 | 11.3 | 8.6 | 9.1 | 2.8 | 2.4 | 6.4 | 1.9 | | 1.1 | | 4.4 | 5.6 | 45.2 | 47.6 |
| 6–11 Dec | Ixè | 1,000 | 27.1 | 23.1 | 12.1 | 9.4 | 9.8 | 2.4 | 2.2 | 6.8 | 2.3 | | | | 4.8 | 4.0 | 46.5 | 46.3 |
| 5–6 Dec | Tecnè | 1,002 | 28.9 | 23.6 | 10.8 | 8.5 | 11.3 | 2.4 | 2.3 | 6.2 | 2.0 | | | | 4.0 | 5.3 | 44.9 | 48.7 |
| 4–9 Dec | SWG | 1.200 | 28.8 | 22.4 | 11.5 | 8.7 | 9.2 | 3.2 | 2.4 | 6.9 | 2.0 | | 1.2 | 1.0 | 2.7 | 6.4 | 45.2 | 47.9 |
| 5–6 Dec | Quorum | 1,202 | 27.5 | 24.2 | 11.6 | 8.6 | 7.8 | 3.5 | 2.1 | 6.0 | 2.0 | | 1.1 | | 5.6 | 3.3 | 45.9 | 45 |
| 4–5 Dec | Termometro Politico | 2,900 | 29.5 | 22.8 | 10.6 | 8.8 | 8.4 | 2.9 | 2.4 | 6.7 | 1.8 | 1.4 | 1.0 | 0.6 | 3.1 | 6.7 | 44.3 | 47.7 |
| 3–5 Dec | BiDiMedia | 1,000 | 28.4 | 24.6 | 11.0 | 8.6 | 9.0 | 2.5 | 1.9 | 6.5 | 1.4 | 1.4 | 0.7 | 0.7 | 3.3 | 3.8 | 45.4 | 46.7 |
| 3–4 Dec | Eumetra | 800 | 28.9 | 23.0 | 11.7 | 8.8 | 8.8 | 2.5 | 2.2 | 6.4 | 2.1 | | 1.2 | | 4.4 | 5.9 | 45.4 | 47.7 |
| 27 Nov – 2 Dec | SWG | 1,200 | 29.1 | 22.4 | 11.7 | 8.9 | 9.0 | 2.9 | 2.5 | 6.7 | 2.0 | | 1.3 | 1.0 | 2.5 | 6.7 | 45.3 | 48.3 |
| 28–29 Nov | Tecnè | 1,000 | 29.1 | 23.4 | 10.7 | 8.6 | 11.4 | 2.5 | 2.2 | 6.1 | 2.1 | | | | 3.9 | 5.7 | 44.5 | 49.1 |
| 28 Nov | Ipsos | 1,000 | 27.7 | 22.6 | 13.0 | 8.7 | 8.0 | 2.2 | 2.0 | 6.2 | 2.2 | | 1.2 | 1.0 | 5.2 | 5.1 | 46 | 45.6 |
| 27–28 Nov | Termometro Politico | 3,100 | 29.3 | 23.0 | 10.6 | 8.6 | 8.5 | 2.9 | 2.4 | 6.6 | 1.8 | 1.4 | 1.2 | 0.6 | 3.2 | 6.3 | 44.4 | 47.6 |
| 21–28 Nov | Winpoll | 1,500 | 27.8 | 26.1 | 10.4 | 8.7 | 9.4 | 2.1 | 2.1 | 6.5 | 1.4 | 1.9 | | | 3.6 | 1.7 | 46.5 | 45.9 |
| 25 Nov | Euromedia | 1,000 | 29.5 | 24.2 | 11.5 | 9.0 | 8.9 | 2.5 | 2.2 | 5.5 | 2.6 | | 0.4 | | 3.7 | 5.3 | 46 | 47.8 |
| 21–22 Nov | Tecnè | 1,000 | 29.3 | 23.1 | 10.6 | 8.6 | 11.3 | 2.4 | 2.3 | 6.3 | 2.0 | | | | 4.1 | 6.2 | 44.3 | 49.2 |
| 20–21 Nov | Termometro Politico | 3,100 | 29.3 | 22.9 | 10.5 | 8.8 | 8.4 | 2.9 | 2.4 | 6.7 | 1.7 | 1.4 | 1.2 | 0.7 | 3.3 | 6.4 | 44.2 | 47.7 |
| 20–25 Nov | SWG | 1,200 | 29.4 | 22.6 | 11.2 | 8.7 | 8.9 | 2.7 | 2.6 | 6.8 | 1.9 | | 1.1 | 1.1 | 3.0 | 6.8 | 45.1 | 48.1 |
| 13–19 Nov | SWG | 1,200 | 29.6 | 22.1 | 11.2 | 9.0 | 8.9 | 2.5 | 2.5 | 6.9 | 2.0 | 1.2 | 1.0 | 1.0 | 1.9 | 7.5 | 44.7 | 48.5 |
| 17–18 Nov | Regional elections in Emilia-Romagna (CSX hold); regional elections in Umbria (CSX gain from CDX) | | | | | | | | | | | | | | | | | |
| 14–15 Nov | Tecnè | 1,001 | 29.5 | 22.9 | 10.6 | 8.7 | 11.3 | 2.5 | 2.4 | 6.2 | 1.9 | | | | 4.0 | 6.6 | 44 | 49.5 |
| 13–15 Nov | Quorum | 1,202 | 28.3 | 23.2 | 11.9 | 9.0 | 8.7 | 3.0 | 2.1 | 6.1 | 1.9 | | | | 5.8 | 5.1 | 45.2 | 46 |
| 13–14 Nov | Termometro Politico | 3,100 | 29.6 | 22.8 | 10.2 | 8.7 | 8.6 | 2.8 | 2.3 | 6.7 | 1.7 | 1.5 | 1.2 | 0.6 | 3.3 | 6.8 | 43.7 | 48.1 |
| 11–12 Nov | Demopolis | 2,000 | 29.2 | 23.5 | 11.4 | 8.7 | 9.2 | 2.3 | 2.0 | 6.3 | 1.6 | | | | 1.5 | 5.7 | 44.8 | 47.1 |
| 6–11 Nov | SWG | 1,200 | 29.8 | 22.1 | 11.3 | 8.9 | 8.9 | 2.6 | 2.3 | 6.7 | 2.1 | 1.0 | 1.2 | 1.0 | 2.1 | 7.7 | 44.5 | 48.8 |
| 7–8 Nov | Tecnè | 1,000 | 29.5 | 22.8 | 10.7 | 8.6 | 11.3 | 2.5 | 2.4 | 6.1 | 2.0 | | | | 4.1 | 6.7 | 44 | 49.4 |
| 6–7 Nov | Termometro Politico | 3,200 | 29.7 | 22.7 | 10.0 | 8.8 | 8.4 | 3.0 | 2.3 | 6.7 | 1.8 | 1.4 | 1.2 | 0.7 | 3.3 | 7.0 | 43.5 | 48.1 |
| 1–4 Nov | Quorum | 1,204 | 28.8 | 22.7 | 11.9 | 8.9 | 9.1 | 2.4 | 2.2 | 6.3 | 2.2 | | | | 5.5 | 6.1 | 45.3 | 46.8 |
| 29 Oct – 4 Nov | SWG | 1,200 | 29.4 | 22.3 | 11.6 | 8.8 | 8.9 | 2.6 | 2.4 | 6.5 | 2.0 | 1.0 | 1.1 | 1.1 | 2.3 | 7.1 | 44.8 | 48.2 |
| 30–31 Oct | Termometro Politico | 3,000 | 29.5 | 22.9 | 10.3 | 8.6 | 8.5 | 3.0 | 2.3 | 6.7 | 1.6 | 1.5 | 1.1 | 0.7 | 3.3 | 6.6 | 43.8 | 47.7 |
| 30–31 Oct | Tecnè | 1,001 | 29.6 | 23.1 | 10.6 | 8.4 | 11.3 | 2.6 | 2.3 | 6.2 | 1.9 | | | | 4.0 | 6.6 | 44.1 | 49.3 |
| 27–28 Oct | Regional elections in Liguria (CDX hold) | | | | | | | | | | | | | | | | | |
| 23–28 Oct | SWG | 1,200 | 29.7 | 22.5 | 11.6 | 8.6 | 8.8 | 2.4 | 2.2 | 6.7 | 1.9 | 1.0 | 1.2 | 1.1 | 2.3 | 7.2 | 44.9 | 48.3 |
| 25–26 Oct | Tecnè | 1,004 | 29.6 | 23.3 | 10.5 | 8.2 | 11.2 | 2.7 | 2.2 | 6.4 | 1.8 | | | | 4.1 | 6.3 | 44.2 | 49 |
| 23–24 Oct | Termometro Politico | 3,000 | 29.2 | 23.0 | 10.2 | 8.8 | 8.6 | 2.9 | 2.3 | 6.9 | 1.7 | 1.5 | 1.1 | 0.6 | 3.2 | 6.2 | 44.1 | 47.7 |
| 22–23 Oct | Eumetra | 800 | 29.7 | 22.9 | 11.3 | 8.7 | 9.2 | 2.6 | 2.1 | 6.6 | 1.9 | | 1.0 | | 4.0 | 6.8 | 44.8 | 48.6 |
| 17–18 Oct | Tecnè | 1,000 | 29.6 | 23.4 | 10.4 | 8.1 | 11.2 | 2.9 | 2.1 | 6.5 | 1.7 | | | | 4.1 | 6.2 | 44.1 | 48.9 |
| 16–17 Oct | Termometro Politico | 3,000 | 29.4 | 22.9 | 10.3 | 8.7 | 8.6 | 3.0 | 2.2 | 6.8 | 1.6 | 1.5 | 1.0 | 0.6 | 3.4 | 6.5 | 43.8 | 47.7 |
| 15–16 Oct | Eumetra | 800 | 29.6 | 22.8 | 11.3 | 8.6 | 9.1 | 2.7 | 2.2 | 6.6 | 1.8 | | 1.1 | | 4.2 | 6.8 | 44.7 | 48.4 |
| 14 Oct | Euromedia | 1,000 | 30.0 | 23.2 | 11.6 | 8.8 | 9.0 | 3.0 | 2.4 | 5.2 | 1.7 | 0.5 | 0.5 | 0.4 | 3.7 | 6.8 | 44.1 | 48.3 |
| 10–11 Oct | Tecnè | 1,000 | 29.5 | 23.6 | 10.2 | 8.1 | 11.2 | 2.8 | 2.0 | 6.6 | 1.8 | | | | 4.2 | 5.9 | 44.2 | 48.8 |
| 9–14 Oct | SWG | 1,200 | 29.3 | 22.3 | 11.7 | 8.6 | 9.0 | 2.7 | 2.3 | 6.8 | 1.8 | 1.1 | 1.1 | 1.3 | 2.0 | 7.0 | 44.9 | 48 |
| 9–10 Oct | Termometro Politico | 2,800 | 29.1 | 23.1 | 10.2 | 8.3 | 9.0 | 2.9 | 2.1 | 6.7 | 1.6 | 1.6 | 1.2 | 0.6 | 3.5 | 6.0 | 43.7 | 47.6 |
| 8–9 Oct | EMG | 1,523 | 29.3 | 22.2 | 12.0 | 8.2 | 8.5 | 2.8 | 2.5 | 7.1 | 2.1 | | 1.2 | | 4.1 | 7.1 | 45.9 | 47.2 |
| 8–9 Oct | Eumetra | 800 | 29.5 | 23.1 | 11.0 | 8.6 | 8.9 | 2.9 | 2.1 | 6.5 | 1.8 | | 1.0 | | 4.6 | 6.4 | 44.5 | 48 |
| 2–7 Oct | SWG | 1,200 | 29.5 | 22.7 | 11.4 | 8.5 | 8.7 | 2.8 | 2.2 | 6.9 | 1.9 | 1.1 | 1.1 | 1.2 | 2.0 | 6.8 | 45.1 | 47.8 |
| 3–4 Oct | Tecnè | 1,000 | 29.4 | 23.7 | 10.5 | 8.0 | 11.1 | 3.0 | 2.0 | 6.5 | 1.7 | | | | 4.1 | 5.7 | 44.4 | 48.5 |
| 2–3 Oct | Termometro Politico | 3,200 | 29.2 | 22.8 | 10.2 | 8.5 | 8.8 | 3.0 | 2.2 | 6.7 | 1.8 | 1.6 | 1.0 | 0.6 | 3.6 | 6.4 | 43.7 | 47.5 |
| 1–2 Oct | Eumetra | 800 | 29.9 | 23.0 | 11.2 | 8.7 | 8.8 | 3.2 | 2.4 | 6.2 | 1.6 | | 0.9 | | 4.3 | 6.9 | 44.4 | 48.3 |
| 26–27 Sep | Tecnè | 1,000 | 29.3 | 23.8 | 10.7 | 8.2 | 11.0 | 2.9 | 1.9 | 6.6 | 1.6 | | | | 4.0 | 5.5 | 44.6 | 48.5 |
| 25–30 Sep | SWG | 1,200 | 29.8 | 22.4 | 11.8 | 8.4 | 8.3 | 3.0 | 2.5 | 7.1 | 1.7 | | 1.0 | 1.2 | 2.8 | 7.4 | 45.5 | 47.5 |
| 25–26 Sep | Termometro Politico | 3,200 | 29.4 | 22.9 | 10.3 | 8.8 | 9.6 | 3.0 | 2.1 | 6.8 | 1.6 | 1.5 | | 0.9 | 3.1 | 6.4 | 43.7 | 47.8 |
| 25 Sep | Euromedia | 800 | 30.3 | 23.5 | 10.5 | 9.2 | 9.0 | 3.4 | 2.4 | 5.0 | 1.5 | 0.8 | 0.8 | 0.4 | 3.7 | 6.8 | 42.9 | 49.3 |
| 24–25 Sep | Eumetra | 800 | 29.7 | 22.9 | 11.7 | 8.4 | 9.1 | 3.0 | 2.5 | 6.6 | 1.6 | | 1.0 | | 3.5 | 6.8 | 45.3 | 48.2 |
| 19–20 Sep | Tecnè | 1,000 | 29.2 | 23.6 | 10.9 | 8.2 | 11.0 | 2.8 | 2.0 | 6.5 | 1.7 | | | | 4.1 | 5.6 | 44.7 | 48.4 |
| 18–23 Sep | SWG | 1,200 | 30.1 | 22.6 | 11.7 | 8.2 | 8.5 | 3.1 | 2.7 | 7.1 | 1.5 | | 1.0 | 1.0 | 2.5 | 7.5 | 45.6 | 47.8 |
| 19 Sep | Noto | | 30.0 | 22.0 | 12.5 | 8.5 | 9.0 | 2.5 | 3.0 | 7.0 | 2.0 | | | | 2.0 | 8.0 | 46.5 | 47.5 |
| 18–19 Sep | Termometro Politico | 3,000 | 29.1 | 23.2 | 9.9 | 9.0 | 9.3 | 3.0 | 2.0 | 7.0 | 1.7 | 1.6 | | 0.9 | 3.3 | 5.9 | 43.8 | 47.4 |
| 17–18 Sep | Eumetra | 803 | 30.0 | 23.0 | 11.8 | 8.5 | 9.1 | 3.0 | 2.4 | 6.5 | 1.8 | | 0.8 | | 3.1 | 7.0 | 45.5 | 48.4 |
| 11–16 Sep | SWG | 1,200 | 30.3 | 22.8 | 11.7 | 8.1 | 8.4 | 3.0 | 2.6 | 7.0 | 1.7 | | | 1.1 | 3.3 | 7.5 | 45.8 | 46.8 |
| 12–13 Sep | Tecnè | | 29.0 | 23.6 | 10.7 | 8.3 | 10.9 | 2.9 | 1.9 | 6.7 | 1.8 | | | | 4.2 | 5.4 | 44.7 | 48.2 |
| 11–12 Sep | Termometro Politico | 3,100 | 29.2 | 23.5 | 10.0 | 8.7 | 9.5 | 3.0 | 2.0 | 6.8 | 1.7 | 1.8 | | 0.9 | 2.9 | 5.7 | 44 | 47.4 |
| 10–12 Sep | Ipsos | 1,000 | 27.5 | 21.6 | 13.9 | 8.2 | 9.0 | 2.5 | 2.5 | 6.0 | 2.0 | | | 1.0 | 5.8 | 5.9 | 46 | 44.7 |
| 10–11 Sep | Eumetra | 800 | 30.1 | 23.1 | 11.2 | 8.3 | 9.5 | 3.0 | 2.3 | 6.7 | 1.8 | | | | 4.0 | 7.0 | 45.1 | 47.9 |
| 10 Sep | Euromedia | 1,000 | 29.7 | 23.9 | 10.3 | 8.9 | 8.8 | 3.3 | 2.5 | 5.4 | 1.8 | 1.0 | 0.6 | 0.7 | 3.1 | 5.8 | 43.9 | 48 |
| 9–11 Sep | Piepoli | 500 | 28.5 | 22.5 | 11.5 | 8.5 | 8.5 | 3.0 | 2.0 | 6.0 | 2.0 | | 1.0 | 1.5 | 5.0 | 6.0 | 44 | 46.5 |
| 9–11 Sep | Ixè | 1,000 | 28.0 | 23.2 | 11.9 | 9.4 | 9.9 | 3.1 | 2.0 | 7.8 | 1.2 | | | | 3.5 | 4.8 | 46.1 | 47.3 |
| 5–7 Sep | BiDiMedia | 1,000 | 29.0 | 23.5 | 10.9 | 9.0 | 8.6 | 3.0 | 2.0 | 6.7 | 1.6 | 1.4 | 0.7 | 0.8 | 2.8 | 5.5 | 44.7 | 47.3 |
| 5–6 Sep | Tecnè | | 28.9 | 23.8 | 10.5 | 8.2 | 10.7 | 2.9 | 2.0 | 6.5 | 2.0 | | | | 4.5 | 5.1 | 44.8 | 47.8 |
| 4–9 Sep | SWG | 1,200 | 30.2 | 22.5 | 11.5 | 8.3 | 8.5 | 3.2 | 2.6 | 7.2 | 1.7 | 1.1 | | | 3.2 | 7.7 | 45.5 | 47 |
| 28 Aug – 2 Sep | SWG | 1,200 | 30.3 | 22.3 | 11.6 | 8.5 | 8.4 | 3.2 | 2.3 | 6.9 | 1.9 | 1.3 | | | 3.3 | 8.0 | 45 | 47.2 |
| 28–29 Aug | Quorum | 1,205 | 28.6 | 23.3 | 11.1 | 7.9 | 9.2 | 3.5 | 2.0 | 7.0 | 2.3 | 1.0 | | | 4.1 | 5.3 | 45.7 | 45.7 |
| 29–30 Aug | Tecnè | | 29.1 | 24.0 | 10.8 | 8.3 | 10.8 | 2.8 | 2.0 | 6.2 | 1.6 | | | | 4.1 | 5.1 | 44.6 | 48.2 |
| 28–29 Aug | Termometro Politico | 2,900 | 29.5 | 23.8 | 9.9 | 8.6 | 9.1 | 3.1 | 2.1 | 7.0 | 1.6 | 1.9 | | 0.9 | 2.5 | 5.7 | 44.4 | 47.2 |
| 21–22 Aug | Termometro Politico | 3,200 | 29.3 | 23.7 | 10.1 | 8.5 | 9.0 | 3.2 | 2.1 | 7.0 | 1.7 | 1.8 | | 1.0 | 2.6 | 5.6 | 44.6 | 46.8 |
| 5–16 Aug | Lab2101 | 1,000 | 28.9 | 23.0 | 11.0 | 9.3 | 9.0 | 3.4 | 2.6 | 5.4 | 2.0 | | 0.7 | 1.5 | 3.2 | 5.9 | 44 | 47.9 |
| 3 Aug | Lab2101 | 1,000 | 28.7 | 23.2 | 10.9 | 9.2 | 9.1 | 3.3 | 2.6 | 5.5 | 2.1 | | 0.9 | 1.5 | 3.0 | 5.5 | 44.3 | 47.9 |
| 24–29 Jul | SWG | 1,200 | 29.8 | 22.7 | 11.4 | 8.3 | 8.3 | 3.2 | 2.4 | 6.7 | 2.0 | 1.5 | | | 3.7 | 7.1 | 45.2 | 46.4 |
| 25–26 Jul | Tecnè | 1,001 | 28.9 | 24.6 | 9.8 | 8.5 | 10.3 | 3.0 | 1.9 | 6.7 | 2.0 | | | | 4.1 | 4.1 | 45 | 47.7 |
| 25 Jul | Euromedia | | 28.7 | 23.5 | 10.4 | 9.2 | 9.0 | 3.4 | 2.4 | 5.6 | 1.5 | 1.1 | 0.9 | 1.0 | 3.3 | 5.2 | 43.4 | 47.8 |
| 24–25 Jul | Termometro Politico | 3,000 | 29.6 | 24.0 | 9.7 | 8.3 | 9.4 | 3.1 | 2.0 | 6.9 | 1.7 | 2.0 | | 1.0 | 2.3 | 5.6 | 44.3 | 47.3 |
| 23–25 Jul | Ipsos | 1,000 | 27.9 | 22.6 | 13.0 | 8.0 | 8.7 | 3.0 | 2.3 | 6.4 | | 1.6 | 0.8 | 1.0 | 4.7 | 5.3 | 44.3 | 45.4 |
| 22–24 Jul | Piepoli | 500 | 28.5 | 22.5 | 11.0 | 8.0 | 8.5 | 3.5 | 2.5 | 6.5 | 2.5 | 1.5 | 1.0 | 1.5 | 2.5 | 6.0 | 45 | 46 |
| 17–22 Jul | SWG | 1,200 | 30.0 | 22.8 | 11.1 | 8.5 | 8.3 | 3.4 | 2.4 | 6.9 | 1.8 | 1.4 | | | 3.4 | 7.2 | 45 | 46.8 |
| 21 Jul | Lab2101 | 1,000 | 28.2 | 23.5 | 10.5 | 9.1 | 9.3 | 3.2 | 2.7 | 5.3 | 2.2 | | 0.7 | 1.4 | 3.9 | 4.7 | 44.2 | 47.3 |
| 18–19 Jul | Tecnè | 1,001 | 28.7 | 24.6 | 9.8 | 8.4 | 10.2 | 3.2 | 2.0 | 6.9 | 2.0 | 1.6 | | | 2.6 | 4.1 | 45.3 | 47.3 |
| 17–18 Jul | Quorum | 1,202 | 28.5 | 23.8 | 10.5 | 8.6 | 9.3 | 2.9 | 1.9 | 6.4 | 2.1 | 1.3 | | 1.2 | 3.5 | 4.7 | 44.7 | 46.4 |
| 16–18 Jul | Termometro Politico | 3,000 | 29.2 | 24.0 | 9.9 | 8.5 | 9.6 | 3.1 | 1.9 | 7.1 | 1.6 | 1.9 | | 1.0 | 2.2 | 5.2 | 44.5 | 47.3 |
| 10–15 Jul | SWG | 1,200 | 29.6 | 23.0 | 10.8 | 8.4 | 8.7 | 3.5 | 2.2 | 7.0 | 1.8 | 1.5 | 1.0 | 1.0 | 1.5 | 6.6 | 44.8 | 47.7 |
| 11–12 Jul | Tecnè | 1,005 | 28.7 | 24.5 | 9.7 | 8.5 | 10.0 | 3.1 | 1.9 | 6.8 | 2.2 | 1.9 | | | 2.7 | 4.2 | 45.1 | 47.2 |
| 9–11 Jul | Termometro Politico | 3,000 | 29.1 | 24.3 | 9.6 | 8.8 | 9.5 | 3.2 | 2.0 | 6.9 | 1.6 | 2.1 | | 1.0 | 1.9 | 4.8 | 44.4 | 47.4 |
| 3–8 Jul | SWG | 1,200 | 29.2 | 23.3 | 10.6 | 8.4 | 8.5 | 3.4 | 2.1 | 7.0 | 1.9 | 1.7 | 1.1 | 1.0 | 1.8 | 5.9 | 44.9 | 47.2 |
| 4–5 Jul | Tecnè | 1,000 | 28.7 | 24.6 | 9.6 | 8.7 | 10.0 | 3.2 | 1.9 | 6.7 | 2.0 | 2.1 | | | 2.5 | 4.1 | 44.8 | 47.4 |
| 3–4 Jul | Termometro Politico | 3,300 | 29.3 | 24.2 | 9.5 | 8.9 | 9.6 | 3.3 | 1.9 | 7.1 | 1.5 | 2.0 | | 0.9 | 1.8 | 5.1 | 44.2 | 47.8 |
| 26 Jun – 1 Jul | SWG | 1,200 | 29.0 | 23.6 | 10.3 | 8.7 | 8.5 | 3.5 | 1.9 | 7.0 | 2.0 | 1.7 | 1.0 | 1.1 | 1.7 | 5.4 | 44.8 | 47.2 |
| 27–28 Jun | Tecnè | 1,000 | 28.8 | 24.5 | 9.6 | 8.8 | 9.8 | 3.4 | 1.7 | 6.8 | 2.1 | 2.2 | | | 2.3 | 4.3 | 44.7 | 47.4 |
| 26–27 Jun | Termometro Politico | 3,200 | 29.6 | 24.2 | 9.4 | 8.7 | 9.6 | 3.1 | 2.0 | 7.2 | 1.5 | 2.1 | | 1.1 | 1.5 | 5.4 | 44.3 | 47.9 |
| 26 Jun | Euromedia | 1,000 | 29.0 | 24.0 | 9.7 | 9.0 | 9.2 | 3.4 | 3.1 | 6.6 | 1.6 | 1.7 | 0.5 | 1.2 | 1.0 | 5.0 | 45 | 47.7 |
| 25–27 Jun | Quorum | 805 | 29.2 | 24.0 | 9.6 | 8.1 | 9.0 | 3.7 | 2.1 | 6.8 | 2.0 | 2.5 | | 0.6 | 2.4 | 5.2 | 44.5 | 46.3 |
| 25–27 Jun | Ipsos | 1,000 | 28.1 | 22.8 | 12.5 | 8.8 | 8.5 | 2.5 | 2.5 | 6.2 | 1.5 | | | 1.1 | 5.5 | 5.3 | 45.5 | 45.4 |
| 24–25 Jun | Demopolis | 2,000 | 29.0 | 25.0 | 10.2 | 8.7 | 9.3 | 3.2 | 2.0 | 6.5 | | | | | 6.1 | 4.0 | 43.7 | 47 |
| 23–24 Jun | Runoff of 8–9 June local elections | | | | | | | | | | | | | | | | | |
| 19–24 Jun | SWG | 1,200 | 29.0 | 23.5 | 10.0 | 8.8 | 8.7 | 3.4 | 1.7 | 7.1 | 2.2 | 2.0 | 1.0 | 1.2 | 1.4 | 5.5 | 44.5 | 47.5 |
| 20–21 Jun | Tecnè | 1,000 | 29.0 | 24.3 | 9.7 | 8.9 | 9.8 | 3.3 | 1.8 | 6.9 | 2.0 | 2.1 | | | | 4.7 | 44.7 | 47.7 |
| 12–17 Jun | SWG | 1,200 | 28.6 | 23.8 | 9.7 | 8.8 | 9.0 | 3.6 | 1.8 | 6.9 | 2.1 | 2.3 | 1.0 | 1.1 | 1.3 | 4.8 | 44.3 | 47.4 |
| 12–13 Jun | Termometro Politico | 3,500 | 29.4 | 24.4 | 9.6 | 8.6 | 9.8 | 3.2 | 2.0 | 7.1 | 1.6 | 2.0 | | 1.0 | 1.3 | 5.0 | 44.7 | 47.8 |

| Polling | | | Parties | | | | | | | | | | | | | | Coalitions | |
| Fieldwork date | Polling firm | Sample size | FdI | PD | M5S | Lega | FI | SUE | A | AVS | PTD | DSP | Libertà | AP | Others | Lead | CSX | CDX |
|---|---|---|---|---|---|---|---|---|---|---|---|---|---|---|---|---|---|---|
| 9 Jun | Election results | —N/a | 28.8 | 24.1 | 10.0 | 9.0 | 9.6 | 3.8 | 3.4 | 6.8 | 2.2 | 0.2 | 1.2 | 0.4 | 0.7 | 4.7 | 44.7 | 47.4 |
| 8–9 Jun | European Parliament election; regional elections in Piedmont (CDX hold); local elections | | | | | | | | | | | | | | | | | |
| 22–23 May | Demopolis | | 27.0 | 22.0 | 14.5 | 8.8 | 8.7 | 4.2 | 3.7 | 4.3 | 2.2 | | 2.8 | 0.5 | 1.3 | 5.0 | 45 | 44.5 |
| 22–23 May | BiDiMedia | 810 | 26.8 | 21.4 | 15.0 | 9.4 | 8.4 | 4.5 | 3.9 | 4.5 | 2.0 | | 2.5 | 0.5 | 1.1 | 5.5 | 45.4 | 44.6 |
| 22–23 May | Termometro Politico | 3,900 | 26.8 | 19.6 | 15.7 | 9.0 | 8.5 | 4.5 | 3.9 | 4.0 | 2.5 | | 1.8 | 1.0 | 2.7 | 7.2 | 43.8 | 44.3 |
| 21–22 May | Eumetra | 800 | 27.1 | 21.0 | 16.2 | 8.7 | 8.9 | 4.5 | 3.8 | 4.2 | 2.2 | | 2.0 | | 1.4 | 6.1 | 45.9 | 44.7 |
| 21–22 May | Quorum | 1,604 | 27.2 | 20.3 | 15.9 | 9.0 | 8.5 | 4.1 | 3.9 | 4.9 | 1.9 | | 0.9 | 0.5 | 2.9 | 6.9 | 45.2 | 44.7 |
| 21 May | Ipsos | 1,000 | 26.5 | 22.5 | 15.4 | 8.6 | 9.2 | 4.1 | 4.6 | 4.6 | 2.0 | | 0.7 | 0.9 | 1.6 | 4.0 | 46.6 | 44.3 |
| 19–23 May | EMG | 2,000 | 26.9 | 20.9 | 15.7 | 9.3 | 7.9 | 4.5 | 3.7 | 4.2 | | | | | 7.1 | 6.0 | 45.3 | 44.1 |
| 19–21 May | Cluster17 | 1,051 | 26.9 | 20.8 | 15.5 | 8.7 | 8.2 | 4.6 | 3.7 | 4.3 | 2.2 | 1.0 | 2.2 | 0.6 | 1.3 | 6.1 | 45.2 | 43.8 |
| 19–20 May | BiDiMedia | 1,190 | 27.1 | 21.2 | 15.2 | 9.1 | 8.3 | 4.6 | 4.0 | 4.4 | 2.0 | | 2.5 | | 1.6 | 5.9 | 45.4 | 44.5 |
| 20–23 May | Ixè | 1,000 | 26.3 | 20.9 | 15.5 | 8.3 | 8.8 | 4.0 | 4.0 | 4.1 | 2.3 | | 2.2 | | 3.6 | 5.4 | 44.5 | 43.4 |
| 19–20 May | Tecnè | | 26.8 | 20.8 | 16.0 | 8.1 | 9.9 | 4.6 | 4.0 | 4.2 | 1.6 | | 2.0 | | 2.0 | 6.0 | 45.6 | 44.8 |
| 19 May | Lab2101 | | 27.7 | 19.5 | 15.9 | 9.3 | 7.8 | 4.8 | 4.0 | 4.4 | | | 3.3 | | 3.3 | 7.7 | 44.6 | 44.8 |
| 15–20 May | SWG | 1,200 | 27.0 | 21.0 | 15.7 | 8.3 | 8.4 | 4.4 | 4.2 | 4.6 | 2.4 | | 2.2 | 1.0 | 0.8 | 6.0 | 45.7 | 43.7 |
| 16 May | Ipsos | | 26.4 | 22.3 | 16.3 | 8.6 | 9.5 | 4.1 | 3.3 | 4.6 | 1.6 | | 1.6 | | 1.7 | 4.1 | 47.3 | 44.5 |
| 18 May | Tecnè | | 27.2 | 20.6 | 15.7 | 8.0 | 9.9 | 4.6 | 4.0 | 4.2 | 1.7 | | 2.1 | | 2.0 | 6.6 | 45.1 | 45.1 |
| 15–16 May | Termometro Politico | 4,300 | 27.2 | 19.6 | 15.9 | 8.8 | 8.4 | 4.9 | 3.9 | 3.8 | 2.5 | | 1.8 | 0.7 | 2.5 | 7.6 | 44.2 | 44.4 |
| 15 May | Euromedia | 800 | 27.0 | 20.3 | 16.7 | 9.2 | 8.5 | 4.5 | 4.0 | 4.2 | 2.7 | | 2.0 | | 0.9 | 6.7 | 45.7 | 44.7 |
| 14 May | BiDiMedia | 1,000 | 27.4 | 21.0 | 15.5 | 8.6 | 8.2 | 4.7 | 4.0 | 4.3 | 1.9 | | 2.2 | | 2.2 | 6.4 | 45.5 | 44.2 |
| 8–13 May | SWG | 1,200 | 26.8 | 20.5 | 16.2 | 8.6 | 8.3 | 4.6 | 4.4 | 4.4 | 2.2 | | 2.4 | | 1.6 | 6.3 | 45.7 | 43.7 |
| 12 May | Quorum | | 26.8 | 20.7 | 16.1 | 8.3 | 8.0 | 4.7 | 4.0 | 4.4 | 1.8 | | 1.0 | | 4.2 | 6.1 | 45.9 | 43.1 |
| 11 May | Tecnè | | 27.4 | 20.5 | 15.7 | 7.9 | 10.1 | 4.5 | 3.9 | 4.1 | | | 2.2 | | 3.7 | 6.9 | 44.8 | 45.4 |
| 8–9 May | Termometro Politico | 3,900 | 27.0 | 19.6 | 16.2 | 8.8 | 8.6 | 4.9 | 3.8 | 3.9 | | | 1.9 | | 5.3 | 7.4 | 44.6 | 44.4 |
| 7–8 May | Eumetra | 800 | 27.6 | 20.5 | 16.5 | 8.6 | 8.7 | 4.7 | 4.0 | 4.2 | 1.9 | | 2.1 | | 1.2 | 7.1 | 45.9 | 44.9 |
| 6–7 May | Demopolis | 2,000 | 27.2 | 20.7 | 15.0 | 8.5 | 8.6 | 4.6 | 3.7 | 4.3 | 2.2 | | 2.8 | | 2.0 | 6.5 | 44.6 | 44.3 |
| 30 Apr – 6 May | SWG | 1,200 | 26.6 | 20.6 | 16.1 | 8.8 | 8.5 | 4.9 | 4.5 | 4.6 | 1.8 | | 2.3 | | 1.3 | 6.0 | 46.2 | 43.9 |
| 4–5 May | BiDiMedia | 1,000 | 27.7 | 20.8 | 15.7 | 8.8 | 8.1 | 4.9 | 4.0 | 4.3 | 1.6 | 0.9 | 2.0 | | 1.2 | 6.9 | 45.7 | 44.6 |
| 2–3 May | Quorum | 800 | 27.3 | 20.5 | 16.0 | 8.3 | 8.3 | 4.5 | 3.8 | 4.4 | 1.9 | | 1.5 | | 3.5 | 6.8 | 45.4 | 43.9 |
| 1–3 May | Tecnè | 4,600 | 27.3 | 20.3 | 15.9 | 7.8 | 10.2 | 4.6 | 3.8 | 4.0 | 1.5 | | 2.1 | | | 7.0 | 44.8 | 45.3 |
| 1–2 May | Euromedia | 4,600 | 27.5 | 20.5 | 17.0 | 8.4 | 8.8 | 4.5 | 3.7 | 3.8 | 2.0 | | 1.8 | | 2.0 | 7.0 | 45.8 | 44.7 |
| 1–2 May | Termometro Politico | 4,600 | 27.3 | 19.8 | 15.9 | 8.6 | 8.4 | 4.9 | 4.0 | 3.6 | 2.5 | 1.7 | 1.7 | | 1.6 | 7.5 | 44.2 | 44.3 |
| 30 Apr | Eumetra | | 27.6 | 20.3 | 16.0 | 8.4 | 8.6 | 4.5 | 4.0 | 4.2 | 1.9 | 1.2 | 2.3 | | 1.0 | 7.3 | 45 | 44.6 |
| 24–29 Apr | SWG | 1,200 | 26.6 | 20.3 | 15.6 | 8.6 | 8.4 | 4.5 | 4.2 | 4.5 | 2.0 | 1.2 | 2.1 | | 2.0 1.0 – Italian Animalist Party–Italexit; 1.0 – Others | 6.3 | 44.9 | 43.6 |
| 24–26 Apr | Tecnè | 1,002 | 27.5 | 20.0 | 16.0 | 7.7 | 10.2 | 4.8 | 3.8 | 3.9 | 1.6 | | 2.2 | | 2.3 | 7.5 | 44.7 | 45.4 |
| 23–25 Apr | Termometro Politico | 3,800 | 27.6 | 19.6 | 16.0 | 8.4 | 8.5 | 5.1 | 3.9 | 3.5 | 2.4 | 1.9 | 1.6 | | 1.5 | 8.0 | 44.2 | 44.5 |
| 24 Apr | Euromedia | 800 | 27.2 | 20.3 | 16.8 | 8.5 | 8.7 | 4.4 | 3.8 | 4.0 | 2.0 | | 2.5 | | 1.8 | 6.9 | 45.5 | 44.4 |
| 24 Apr | Eumetra | | 27.9 | 20.1 | 16.2 | 8.3 | 8.4 | 4.4 | 3.9 | 4.0 | 1.7 | 1.2 | 2.2 | | 1.7 | 7.8 | 44.7 | 44.6 |
| 17–22 Apr | SWG | 1,200 | 26.8 | 20.0 | 15.9 | 8.5 | 8.4 | 4.7 | 4.1 | 4.3 | 2.1 | 1.4 | 2.2 | | 1.6 | 6.8 | 44.9 | 43.7 |
| 22 Apr | Quorum | | 27.8 | 20.5 | 16.5 | 7.2 | 7.6 | 5.0 | 3.3 | 4.4 | 1.9 | | 1.6 | | | 7.3 | 46.4 | 42.6 |
| 21–22 Apr | Regional elections in Basilicata (CDX hold) | | | | | | | | | | | | | | | | | |
| 18–21 Apr | EMG | | 26.8 | 20.8 | 16.2 | 8.4 | 8.7 | 5.4 | 3.7 | 3.7 | | | | | 6.3 | 6.0 | 46.1 | 43.9 |
| 17–18 Apr | Demos | 1,005 | 28.0 | 20.2 | 16.4 | 8.5 | 8.0 | 4.1 | 4.0 | 4.2 | | | | | 6.6 | 7.8 | 44.9 | 44.5 |
| 16–18 Apr | Termometro Politico | 4,100 | 27.5 | 19.7 | 16.1 | 8.5 | 8.3 | 5.2 | 3.8 | 3.2 | 2.5 | 1.9 | 1.6 | | 1.7 | 7.8 | 44.2 | 44.3 |
| 16–17 Apr | Eumetra | | 27.4 | 19.7 | 16.4 | 8.5 | 8.3 | 5.1 | 3.8 | 3.8 | 1.9 | 1.3 | 1.9 | | 2.0 | 7.7 | 45 | 44.2 |
| 10–15 Apr | SWG | 1,200 | 27.2 | 19.4 | 16.0 | 8.6 | 8.4 | 5.2 | 4.2 | 4.1 | 1.8 | 1.4 | 1.9 | | 1.8 | 7.8 | 44.7 | 44.2 |
| 13 Apr | Tecnè | | 27.3 | 19.8 | 16.2 | 7.9 | 10.1 | 5.5 | 3.6 | 3.7 | 1.6 | | 2.0 | | 2.3 | 7.5 | 45.2 | 45.3 |
| 8–12 Apr | Ixè | 1,000 | 26.6 | 19.9 | 16.4 | 8.0 | 8.4 | 4.0 | 3.7 | 4.2 | 1.1 | | 1.3 | | 6.4 1.0 – Us Moderates; 5.4 – Others | 6.7 | 44.5 | 43 |
| 9–11 Apr | Termometro Politico | 3,700 | 27.8 | 19.5 | 15.6 | 8.8 | 8.0 | 5.1 | 3.9 | 3.3 | 2.4 | 1.8 | 1.8 | | 2.4 | 8.3 | 43.5 | 44.6 |
| 8–9 Apr | Demopolis | 2,000 | 27.0 | 20.0 | 15.8 | 8.0 | 8.7 | 4.6 | 3.5 | 3.8 | 2.2 | | 2.1 | | 2.0 | 7.0 | 44.2 | 43.7 |
| 3–8 Apr | SWG | 1,200 | 26.9 | 19.8 | 15.6 | 8.8 | 7.8 | 5.3 | 4.0 | 3.9 | 1.6 | 1.4 | 1.5 | | 3.4 1.0 – Us Moderates; 2.4 – Others | 7.1 | 44.6 | 43.5 |
| 8 Apr | Euromedia | 800 | 26.9 | 19.7 | 17.6 | 8.7 | 8.5 | 4.4 | 3.8 | 3.7 | 1.8 | | 3.7 | | 1.2 | 7.2 | 45.4 | 44.1 |
| 4–5 Apr | Quorum | 801 | 27.7 | 19.8 | 16.0 | 7.5 | 7.8 | 4.6 | 3.1 | 3.9 | 2.2 | | 1.6 | | 4.7 | 7.9 | 44.3 | 43 |
| 2–4 Apr | EMG | 1,000 | 27.2 | 20.2 | 16.7 | 7.8 | 9.0 | 6.2 | 3.2 | 3.3 | 1.2 | | | | 5.2 1.0 – Us Moderates; 4.2 – Others | 7.0 | 46.4 | 44 |

| Polling | | | Parties | | | | | | | | | | | | | | | Coalitions | |
| Fieldwork date | Polling firm | Sample size | FdI | PD | M5S | Lega | FI | A | IV | AVS | +E | Italexit | PTD (Note: Polls before 25 March 2024 refer to it as the People's Union.) | DSP | NM | Others | Lead | CSX | CDX |
|---|---|---|---|---|---|---|---|---|---|---|---|---|---|---|---|---|---|---|---|
| 3–4 Apr | Termometro Politico | 4,400 | 27.6 | 19.5 | 15.9 | 8.6 | 7.1 | 3.8 | 2.9 | 3.5 | 2.6 | | 2.1 | 1.6 | 1.0 | 3.8 | 8.1 | 44.4 | 44.3 |
| 2–4 Apr | Piepoli | 500 | 28.0 | 19.5 | 17.0 | 8.5 | 8.0 | 4.0 | 3.5 | 4.0 | 3.5 | | | | 1.5 | 3.5 | 8.5 | 47.5 | 46 |
| 2–3 Apr | Eumetra | 800 | 27.2 | 20.0 | 16.3 | 8.3 | 8.1 | 3.9 | 3.4 | 3.9 | 2.9 | 1.3 | 3.0 | | 0.9 | 0.8 | 7.2 | 46.5 | 44.5 |
| 27 Mar – 2 Apr | SWG | 1,200 | 26.7 | 20.1 | 15.8 | 8.5 | 7.6 | 4.1 | 3.4 | 4.1 | 2.9 | | 1.4 | 1.3 | 1.0 | 3.1 | 6.6 | 46.3 | 43.8 |
| 28–29 Mar | Tecnè | 803 | 27.5 | 20.5 | 15.6 | 7.8 | 9.4 | 3.6 | 3.2 | 4.0 | 3.0 | | | | | 5.4 | 7.5 | 46.3 | 44.7 |
| 26–28 Mar | BiDiMedia | 2,000 | 27.1 | 20.2 | 16.6 | 8.3 | 7.1 | 4.4 | w. +E/SUE | 4.4 | 5.1 | | 1.5 | 1.3 | 0.8 | 3.0 | 6.9 | 46.3 | 43.3 |
| 27–28 Mar | Termometro Politico | 4,000 | 27.5 | 19.5 | 16.0 | 9.0 | 7.2 | 3.8 | 2.8 | 3.2 | 2.4 | | 1.8 | 1.7 | 1.2 | 3.9 | 8.0 | 43.9 | 44.9 |
| 20–25 Mar | SWG | 1,200 | 27.0 | 19.9 | 15.6 | 8.3 | 7.7 | 4.0 | 3.4 | 4.1 | 2.8 | | 1.6 | 1.6 | 1.1 | 2.9 | 7.1 | 45.8 | 44.1 |
| 19–25 Mar | Ipsos | 1,000 | 27.5 | 20.5 | 16.1 | 8.0 | 8.7 | 2.5 | 3.3 | 3.3 | 2.8 | 1.5 | 1.5 | 1.2 | 0.7 | 2.4 | 7.0 | 46 | 44.9 |
| 23 Mar | Tecnè | | 27.4 | 20.5 | 15.6 | 7.8 | 9.4 | 3.8 | 3.3 | 4.2 | 2.8 | | | | | 5.2 | 6.9 | 46.4 | 44.6 |
| 21 Mar | Demopolis | | 28.2 | 20.3 | 15.6 | 8.0 | 7.8 | 3.2 | | 3.6 | | | | | | 3.0 | 7.9 | 39.5 | 44 |
| 20–21 Mar | Termometro Politico | 4,200 | 27.8 | 19.3 | 15.8 | 9.0 | 7.3 | 3.8 | 3.0 | 3.4 | 2.6 | | 1.3 | 1.7 | 1.1 | 3.9 | 8.5 | 44.1 | 45.2 |
| 19–20 Mar | Eumetra | 800 | 27.2 | 19.7 | 16.1 | 8.1 | 8.0 | 3.7 | 3.3 | 4.1 | | | | | | | 7.5 | 43.2 | 43.3 |
| 13–18 Mar | SWG | 1,200 | 26.8 | 19.8 | 15.3 | 8.0 | 7.8 | 4.3 | 3.2 | 4.2 | 2.9 | 1.7 | 1.1 | 1.4 | 1.1 | 2.4 | 7.0 | 45.4 | 43.7 |
| 14–15 Mar | Tecnè | | 27.6 | 20.3 | 15.8 | 7.9 | 9.3 | 3.9 | 3.2 | 4.1 | 2.7 | | | | | 5.2 | 7.3 | 46.1 | 44.8 |
| 13–14 Mar | Termometro Politico | 3,900 | 28.2 | 19.5 | 15.9 | 9.0 | 7.1 | 3.9 | 2.8 | 3.3 | 2.5 | | 1.3 | 1.7 | 1.0 | 3.8 | 8.7 | 44 | 45.3 |
| 12–13 Mar | Eumetra | 800 | 27.5 | 19.9 | 16.2 | 8.2 | 7.9 | 3.9 | 3.2 | 4.0 | 2.5 | 1.5 | 1.5 | | 1.0 | 2.7 | 7.6 | 45.8 | 44.6 |
| 6–11 Mar | SWG | 1,200 | 27.1 | 20.2 | 15.4 | 8.1 | 7.6 | 4.5 | 3.1 | 4.1 | 2.7 | 1.5 | 1.4 | 1.3 | 1.0 | 2.0 | 6.9 | 45.5 | 43.8 |
| 10 Mar | Regional elections in Abruzzo (CDX hold) | | | | | | | | | | | | | | | | | | |
| 7–8 Mar | Tecnè | 1,001 | 27.8 | 20.2 | 16.1 | 7.9 | 9.2 | 4.1 | 3.1 | 4.0 | 2.6 | | | | | 5.0 | 7.6 | 46 | 44.9 |
| 6–7 Mar | Termometro Politico | 3,900 | 28.5 | 19.5 | 16.1 | 9.1 | 6.8 | 3.9 | 2.8 | 3.3 | 2.4 | | 1.2 | 1.8 | 1.1 | 3.5 | 9.0 | 44.1 | 45.5 |
| 5–6 Mar | Eumetra | 800 | 27.7 | 19.6 | 16.4 | 8.1 | 7.9 | 3.7 | 3.2 | 3.8 | 2.5 | 1.7 | 1.4 | | 1.0 | 3.0 | 8.1 | 45.5 | 44.7 |
| 23 Feb – 5 Mar | Ipsos | 1,503 | 27.0 | 19.0 | 17.4 | 8.2 | 8.2 | 3.0 | 3.4 | 4.1 | 2.6 | | | | | 7.1 | 8.0 | 46.5 | 43.4 |
| 28 Feb – 4 Mar | SWG | 1,200 | 27.3 | 20.0 | 15.8 | 8.0 | 7.6 | 4.3 | 3.1 | 4.2 | 2.8 | 1.7 | 1.3 | 1.1 | 1.0 | 1.8 | 7.3 | 45.9 | 43.9 |
| 29 Feb – 1 Mar | Tecnè | 1,001 | 28.1 | 20.0 | 16.0 | 8.1 | 9.3 | 4.0 | 3.2 | 3.9 | 2.5 | | | | | 4.9 | 8.1 | 45.6 | 45.5 |
| 28 Feb – 1 Mar | Quorum | 803 | 27.1 | 19.9 | 15.9 | 8.1 | 6.6 | 3.7 | 3.5 | 4.6 | 3.4 | 1.6 | | | 0.7 | 4.9 | 7.2 | 47.3 | 42.5 |
| 29 Feb | Demopolis | 2,000 | 28.0 | 20.8 | 17.0 | 7.6 | 7.0 | 3.5 | | 3.7 | | | | | | | 7.2 | 41.5 | 42.6 |
| 27–29 Feb | Termometro Politico | 4,300 | 28.7 | 19.6 | 16.2 | 9.2 | 6.7 | 3.7 | 2.8 | 3.1 | 2.5 | | 1.3 | 1.7 | 1.1 | 3.4 | 9.1 | 44.2 | 45.7 |
| 27–28 Feb | Eumetra | 800 | 27.9 | 19.5 | 16.3 | 8.2 | 7.5 | 3.8 | 3.4 | 3.8 | 2.4 | 1.8 | 1.5 | | 0.9 | 3.0 | 8.4 | 45.4 | 44.5 |
| 26–27 Feb | Piepoli | 510 | 28.5 | 19.5 | 16.0 | 8.5 | 7.5 | 4.5 | 4.0 | 4.0 | 2.5 | | | | 1.5 | 3.5 | 9.0 | 46 | 46 |
| 21–26 Feb | SWG | 1,200 | 27.7 | 20.0 | 15.6 | 8.1 | 7.1 | 4.4 | 3.3 | 4.2 | 2.6 | 1.7 | 1.4 | 1.2 | | 2.7 | 7.7 | 45.7 | 42.9 |
| 25 Feb | Regional elections in Sardinia (CSX gain from CDX) | | | | | | | | | | | | | | | | | | |
| 24 Feb | Antonio Tajani is elected secretary of Forza Italia | | | | | | | | | | | | | | | | | | |
| 22–23 Feb | Tecnè | | 28.3 | 19.9 | 16.1 | 8.2 | 9.4 | 3.9 | 3.1 | 3.9 | 2.4 | | | | | 4.8 | 8.4 | 45.4 | 45.9 |
| 20–22 Feb | Ipsos | 1,000 | 28.2 | 18.3 | 17.0 | 8.3 | 7.9 | 3.3 | 3.6 | 3.5 | 2.2 | 2.0 | 1.8 | 1.0 | 1.1 | 1.8 | 9.9 | 44.6 | 45.5 |
| 21–22 Feb | Eumetra | 800 | 28.2 | 19.8 | 16.1 | 8.2 | 7.2 | 4.1 | 3.2 | 3.9 | 2.4 | 1.5 | 1.3 | | 0.8 | 3.3 | 8.4 | 45.4 | 44.4 |
| 20–22 Feb | Termometro Politico | 3,900 | 28.6 | 19.6 | 16.0 | 9.3 | 6.5 | 3.8 | 2.8 | 3.3 | 2.5 | | 1.4 | 1.8 | 1.1 | 3.3 | 9.9 | 44.2 | 45.5 |
| 17–22 Feb | Stack Data Strategy | 944 | 27.1 | 19.9 | 15.5 | 8.7 | 6.6 | 3.3 | 4.9 | 3.7 | 4.2 | 1.7 | 1.4 | | 0.9 | 2.1 | 7.3 | 48.2 | 43.3 |
| 14–19 Feb | SWG | 1,200 | 28.2 | 20.1 | 15.3 | 8.0 | 7.1 | 4.2 | 3.3 | 4.3 | 2.4 | 1.5 | 1.4 | 1.3 | | 2.9 | 8.1 | 45.4 | 43.3 |
| 13–19 Feb | Ixè | 1,000 | 28.1 | 19.0 | 15.8 | 8.8 | 7.8 | 3.7 | 3.0 | 4.3 | 2.6 | 1.7 | | | 1.4 | 3.8 | 9.1 | 44.7 | 46.1 |
| 15–16 Feb | Tecnè | 1,000 | 28.4 | 20.0 | 16.0 | 8.2 | 9.2 | 3.8 | 3.0 | 3.9 | 2.4 | | | | | 5.1 | 8.4 | 45.3 | 45.8 |
| 15 Feb | Proger Index | | 28.5 | 19.7 | 16.5 | 8.2 | 7.1 | 4.3 | 3.3 | 4.0 | 2.5 | 1.4 | | | 1.4 | 3.1 | 8.8 | 46 | 45.2 |
| 13–15 Feb | Termometro Politico | 4,100 | 28.8 | 19.7 | 16.0 | 9.3 | 6.7 | 3.8 | 2.7 | 3.2 | 2.4 | | 1.4 | 1.8 | 1.1 | 3.1 | 9.1 | 44 | 45.9 |
| 13–14 Feb | Eumetra | 800 | 28.0 | 19.6 | 16.3 | 8.3 | 7.1 | 4.1 | 3.1 | 3.7 | 2.6 | 1.6 | 1.3 | | 0.5 | 3.8 | 8.4 | 45.3 | 43.9 |
| 12–13 Feb | Tecnè | 1,000 | 28.4 | 19.8 | 16.2 | 8.2 | 9.1 | 3.9 | 3.0 | 3.8 | 2.4 | | | | | 5.2 | 8.6 | 45.2 | 45.7 |
| 12 Feb | Piepoli | 504 | 29.0 | 19.5 | 16.0 | 8.5 | 7.0 | 4.5 | 3.5 | 4.0 | 3.0 | | | | 1.5 | 3.5 | 9.5 | 46 | 46 |
| 7–12 Feb | SWG | 1,200 | 27.9 | 19.7 | 15.7 | 8.3 | 7.3 | 4.3 | 3.1 | 4.2 | 2.5 | 1.7 | 1.5 | 1.1 | | 2.7 | 8.2 | 45.2 | 43.5 |
| 7–8 Feb | Tecnè | 997 | 28.5 | 19.8 | 16.2 | 8.4 | 9.2 | 3.7 | 2.9 | 3.7 | 2.4 | | | | | 5.2 | 8.7 | 45 | 46.1 |
| 7–8 Feb | Termometro Politico | 3,800 | 28.8 | 19.6 | 16.3 | 9.5 | 6.5 | 3.7 | 2.7 | 3.1 | 2.5 | 1.3 | 1.4 | 1.6 | 1.0 | 2.5 | 9.2 | 44.2 | 45.8 |
| 5–8 Feb | Demos & Pi | 1,001 | 28.2 | 19.6 | 16.9 | 8.3 | 7.0 | 4.0 | 2.9 | 3.5 | 2.5 | | | | | 7.1 | 8.6 | 45.4 | 43.5 |
| 5 Feb | Piepoli | 510 | 29.5 | 20.0 | 16.5 | 9.0 | 7.0 | 4.0 | 3.5 | 4.0 | 2.5 | | | | 1.5 | 2.5 | 9.5 | 46.5 | 47 |
| 31 Jan – 5 Feb | SWG | 1,200 | 28.1 | 20.0 | 15.9 | 8.5 | 7.3 | 4.3 | 3.1 | 4.0 | 2.4 | 1.6 | 1.3 | | | 3.5 | 8.1 | 45.4 | 43.9 |
| 1–2 Feb | Tecnè | 1,004 | 28.7 | 19.7 | 16.4 | 8.3 | 9.3 | 3.6 | 3.0 | 3.6 | 2.3 | | | | | 5.1 | 9.0 | 45 | 46.3 |
| 30–31 Jan | Eumetra | 800 | 28.5 | 19.7 | 16.8 | 8.5 | 7.4 | 4.3 | 3.1 | 3.6 | 2.5 | 1.4 | 1.2 | | 0.5 | | 8.8 | 45.7 | 44.9 |
| 28–29 Jan | Tecnè | 998 | 28.8 | 19.6 | 16.5 | 8.4 | 9.3 | 3.5 | 3.0 | 3.6 | 2.3 | | | | | 5.0 | 9.2 | 45 | 46.5 |
| 24–29 Jan | SWG | 1,200 | 28.5 | 19.5 | 15.9 | 8.7 | 7.2 | 4.3 | 3.3 | 3.9 | 2.5 | 1.4 | 1.3 | | | 3.5 | 9.0 | 45.1 | 44.4 |
| 23–29 Jan | Ixè | 1,000 | 29.6 | 19.1 | 16.8 | 8.0 | 6.5 | 3.6 | 2.2 | 4.4 | 2.5 | 2.3 | | | 0.9 | 4.1 | 10.5 | 45 | 45 |
| 24–27 Jan | BiDiMedia | 1,000 | 28.6 | 19.3 | 16.1 | 9.0 | 6.6 | 4.2 | 3.1 | 3.8 | 2.5 | 1.2 | 1.3 | 1.3 | 1.0 | 2.0 | 9.3 | 44.8 | 45.2 |
| 25–26 Jan | Quorum | 803 | 28.4 | 19.2 | 13.6 | 9.3 | 6.5 | 3.7 | 2.9 | 4.3 | 2.6 | 1.5 | | | 1.6 | 6.4 | 9.2 | 42.6 | 45.8 |
| 25–26 Jan | Tecnè | 1,000 | 28.8 | 19.5 | 16.4 | 8.4 | 9.4 | 3.6 | 3.0 | 3.5 | 2.2 | | | | | 5.2 | 9.3 | 44.6 | 46.6 |
| 24–25 Jan | Termometro Politico | 4,100 | 29.0 | 19.4 | 16.0 | 9.6 | 6.6 | 3.9 | 2.8 | 3.1 | 2.5 | 1.4 | 1.4 | 1.6 | | 2.7 | 9.6 | 43.8 | 45.2 |
| 23–24 Jan | EMG | 1,501 | 27.3 | 18.7 | 17.0 | 8.1 | 8.3 | 3.5 | 4.2 | 3.9 | 2.7 | | 1.1 | | 1.2 | 4.0 | 8.6 | 46.5 | 44.9 |
| 23–24 Jan | Eumetra | 800 | 28.9 | 19.4 | 16.3 | 8.9 | 7.3 | 4.1 | 3.4 | 3.5 | 2.3 | 1.6 | 1.4 | | 0.7 | 2.2 | 9.5 | 44.9 | 45.8 |
| 21–22 Jan | Tecnè | 801 | 29.0 | 19.5 | 16.3 | 8.4 | 9.3 | 3.7 | 2.9 | 3.5 | 2.5 | | | | | 4.9 | 9.5 | 44.7 | 46.7 |
| 17–22 Jan | SWG | 1,200 | 28.8 | 19.1 | 16.1 | 8.5 | 7.4 | 4.3 | 3.4 | 3.6 | 2.4 | 1.6 | 1.5 | | 1.0 | 2.3 | 9.7 | 44.6 | 45.7 |
| 19 Jan | Piepoli | – | 30.0 | 19.0 | 16.5 | 8.5 | 7.0 | 3.5 | 4.0 | 3.0 | 3.0 | 1.5 | | | 1.5 | 2.5 | 11.0 | 45.5 | 47 |
| 18–19 Jan | Tecnè | 997 | 28.9 | 19.3 | 16.3 | 8.5 | 9.3 | 3.8 | 2.9 | 3.3 | 2.3 | | | | | 5.4 | 9.6 | 44.1 | 46.7 |
| 17–18 Jan | Termometro Politico | 4,200 | 29.1 | 19.3 | 16.3 | 9.6 | 6.5 | 3.8 | 2.8 | 3.1 | 2.6 | 1.3 | 1.4 | 1.5 | | 2.7 | 9.8 | 44.1 | 45.2 |
| 16–18 Jan | Ipsos | 1,000 | 29.0 | 19.7 | 16.2 | 8.7 | 7.0 | 3.3 | 3.0 | 4.2 | 2.1 | 1.7 | 1.4 | 1.3 | 1.1 | 1.3 | 9.3 | 45.2 | 45.8 |
| 16–17 Jan | Eumetra | 800 | 28.9 | 19.2 | 16.5 | 9.2 | 7.2 | 4.1 | 3.5 | 3.3 | 2.4 | 1.6 | 1.3 | | 0.7 | 2.1 | 9.7 | 44.9 | 46 |
| 15–16 Jan | Tecnè | 1,000 | 28.8 | 19.4 | 16.1 | 8.5 | 9.4 | 3.8 | 3.0 | 3.5 | 2.3 | | | | | 5.2 | 9.4 | 44.3 | 46.7 |
| 14–15 Jan | Tecnè | 800 | 28.9 | 19.3 | 16.2 | 8.5 | 9.4 | 3.8 | 3.0 | 3.4 | 2.4 | | | | | 5.1 | 9.6 | 44.3 | 46.8 |
| 10–15 Jan | SWG | 1,200 | 29.0 | 19.4 | 16.1 | 8.8 | 7.2 | 4.0 | 3.5 | 3.4 | 2.3 | 1.6 | 1.4 | | 1.0 | 2.0 | 9.6 | 44.7 | 46 |
| 12 Jan | Piepoli | – | 29.5 | 19.0 | 16.5 | 9.0 | 7.5 | 4.0 | 3.5 | 3.0 | 2.5 | 1.5 | | | 1.5 | 2.5 | 10.5 | 44.5 | 47.5 |
| 11–12 Jan | Tecnè | 997 | 28.8 | 19.2 | 16.1 | 8.4 | 9.3 | 3.9 | 2.8 | 3.5 | 2.5 | | | | | 5.5 | 9.6 | 44.1 | 46.5 |
| 10–11 Jan | Termometro Politico | 3,800 | 29.5 | 19.4 | 16.0 | 9.5 | 6.3 | 3.9 | 2.7 | 3.0 | 2.5 | 1.7 | 1.5 | 1.5 | | 2.5 | 10.1 | 43.6 | 45.3 |
| 8–11 Jan | Lab2101 | 1,000 | 28.9 | 19.7 | 16.3 | 10.1 | 6.0 | 3.9 | 3.1 | 4.2 | 2.5 | 2.0 | | | 0.7 | 2.6 | 9.2 | 45.8 | 45.7 |
| 10 Jan | Proger Index | 800 | 29.8 | 19.2 | 16.8 | 8.6 | 6.9 | 3.9 | 3.4 | 3.5 | 2.4 | 1.3 | | | 1.4 | 2.8 | 10.6 | 45.3 | 46.7 |
| 9–10 Jan | Eumetra | 800 | 29.3 | 19.2 | 16.3 | 9.5 | 7.2 | 4.1 | 3.2 | 3.1 | 2.5 | 1.5 | | | 1.0 | 3.1 | 10.1 | 44.3 | 47 |
| 9 Jan | Euromedia | 1,000 | 28.3 | 19.1 | 16.7 | 9.4 | 7.3 | 4.2 | 3.6 | 3.4 | 2.6 | 1.7 | | | 0.5 | 3.2 | 9.2 | 45.4 | 45.5 |
| 7–8 Jan | Tecnè | 801 | 28.7 | 19.2 | 16.3 | 8.3 | 9.3 | 3.9 | 2.9 | 3.5 | 2.5 | | | | | 5.4 | 9.5 | 44.4 | 46.3 |
| 3–8 Jan | SWG | 1,200 | 29.2 | 19.1 | 16.4 | 9.1 | 7.3 | 4.0 | 3.5 | 3.2 | 2.4 | 1.4 | 1.2 | | 1.2 | 2.0 | 10.1 | 44.6 | 46.8 |
| 30 Dec – 4 Jan | Lab2101 | 1,000 | 29.2 | 19.6 | 16.2 | 10.3 | 5.9 | 3.9 | 3.0 | 4.3 | 2.6 | 1.9 | | | 0.7 | 2.4 | 9.6 | 45.7 | 46.1 |
| 2 Jan | Tecnè | 791 | 28.8 | 19.0 | 16.5 | 8.3 | 9.4 | 3.8 | 3.0 | 3.5 | 2.4 | | | | | 5.3 | 9.8 | 44.4 | 46.5 |

=== 2023 ===
| Polling | | | Parties | | | | | | | | | | | | | | | Coalitions | |
| Fieldwork date | Polling firm | Sample size | FdI | PD | M5S | Lega | FI | A | IV | AVS | +E | Italexit | UP | DSP | NM | Others | Lead | CSX | CDX |
|---|---|---|---|---|---|---|---|---|---|---|---|---|---|---|---|---|---|---|---|
| 27–29 Dec | Termometro Politico | 3,600 | 29.1 | 19.2 | 16.1 | 9.7 | 6.4 | 4.0 | 2.6 | 3.1 | 2.6 | 2.0 | 1.5 | 1.4 | | 2.3 | 9.9 | 24.9 | 45.2 |
| 18–23 Dec | Lab2101 | 1,000 | 29.5 | 19.5 | 16.1 | 10.4 | 5.7 | 3.7 | 2.9 | 4.2 | 2.5 | 2.3 | | | 0.6 | 2.6 | 10.0 | 26.2 | 46.2 |
| 20–21 Dec | Termometro Politico | 3,800 | 29.3 | 19.4 | 16.3 | 9.7 | 6.1 | 3.8 | 2.6 | 3.0 | 2.6 | 2.0 | 1.5 | 1.4 | | 2.3 | 9.9 | 25 | 45.1 |
| 20 Dec | Euromedia | 1,000 | 28.5 | 19.5 | 16.5 | 9.3 | 7.5 | 4.1 | 3.2 | 3.6 | 2.5 | 1.3 | | | 0.5 | 3.5 | 9.0 | 25.6 | 45.8 |
| 13–18 Dec | SWG | 1,200 | 28.5 | 19.4 | 16.8 | 9.1 | 7.2 | 3.7 | 3.4 | 3.4 | 2.6 | 1.7 | 1.4 | | 1.3 | 1.5 | 9.1 | 25.4 | 46.1 |
| 14–15 Dec | Tecnè | 997 | 28.5 | 19.4 | 16.0 | 8.4 | 9.8 | 4.1 | 2.9 | 3.5 | 2.5 | | | | | 4.9 | 9.1 | 25.4 | 46.7 |
| 11–15 Dec | Ixè | 1,000 | 29.3 | 18.9 | 17.6 | 8.1 | 6.8 | 4.0 | 2.1 | 3.7 | 2.7 | 2.1 | | | 1.0 | 3.7 | 10.4 | 25.3 | 45.2 |
| 13–14 Dec | Quorum | 805 | 28.5 | 19.6 | 13.4 | 10.0 | 5.9 | 4.0 | 2.9 | 4.0 | 2.2 | 1.6 | | | 2.0 | 5.9 | 8.9 | 25.8 | 46.4 |
| 13–14 Dec | Termometro Politico | 3,900 | 29.6 | 19.3 | 16.0 | 9.6 | 6.3 | 3.7 | 2.6 | 3.2 | 2.6 | 1.9 | 1.5 | 1.5 | | 2.2 | 10.3 | 25.1 | 45.5 |
| 12–14 Dec | Ipsos | 1,000 | 29.3 | 19.0 | 17.2 | 8.0 | 6.8 | 3.2 | 3.5 | 4.0 | 2.4 | 1.4 | 1.4 | 1.0 | 1.0 | 1.8 | 10.3 | 25.4 | 45.1 |
| 8–14 Dec | Lab2101 | 1,000 | 29.3 | 19.7 | 16.3 | 10.6 | 5.6 | 3.7 | 3.0 | 4.1 | 2.6 | 2.5 | | | 0.7 | 1.9 | 9.6 | 26.4 | 46.2 |
| 13 Dec | Euromedia | 800 | 28.3 | 19.2 | 16.8 | 9.0 | 7.7 | 4.2 | 3.1 | 3.5 | 2.6 | 1.5 | | | 0.4 | 3.7 | 9.1 | 25.3 | 45.4 |
| 12–13 Dec | BiDiMedia | 1,000 | 28.5 | 19.7 | 15.3 | 8.7 | 6.8 | 4.4 | 2.9 | 3.3 | 2.7 | 1.6 | 1.3 | 1.3 | 0.8 | 2.7 1.0 – Popular Alternative; 1.7 – Others | 8.8 | 25.7 | 44.8 |
| 12–13 Dec | Eumetra | 800 | 28.6 | 19.5 | 16.1 | 9.5 | 7.3 | 3.8 | 3.1 | 3.4 | 2.5 | 1.9 | | | 1.1 | 3.2 | 9.1 | 25.4 | 46.5 |
| 10–11 Dec | Tecnè | 998 | 28.5 | 19.2 | 16.0 | 8.3 | 9.9 | 4.1 | 3.1 | 3.5 | 2.4 | | | | | 5.0 | 9.3 | 25.1 | 46.7 |
| 5–11 Dec | SWG | 1,200 | 28.2 | 19.6 | 16.4 | 9.4 | 7.2 | 3.6 | 3.2 | 3.3 | 2.6 | 1.9 | 1.6 | | 1.2 | 1.8 | 8.6 | 25.5 | 46 |
| 7–8 Dec | EMG | 1,000 | 27.5 | 18.8 | 17.0 | 8.0 | 8.5 | 4.0 | 4.0 | 3.0 | 2.5 | 2.5 | 1.5 | | 1.0 | | 8.8 | 24.3 | 45 |
| 6–7 Dec | Demopolis | 1,500 | 28.5 | 19.8 | 16.0 | 9.5 | 7.3 | 3.8 | 3 | 3.5 | | | | | | | 8.7 | 23.3 | 45.3 |
| 6–7 Dec | Quorum | 805 | 28.9 | 19.3 | 13.5 | 9.9 | 6.2 | 4.1 | 3.2 | 3.7 | 2.2 | 1.8 | | | 1.8 | 5.4 | 9.6 | 25.2 | 46.8 |
| 6–7 Dec | Tecnè | 1,000 | 28.7 | 19.2 | 15.9 | 8.5 | 9.9 | 4.0 | 3.1 | 3.4 | 2.6 | | | | | 4.7 | 9.5 | 25.2 | 47.1 |
| 1–7 Dec | Lab2101 | 1,000 | 29.1 | 19.8 | 16.2 | 10.5 | 5.6 | 3.8 | 2.9 | 4.2 | 2.5 | 2.5 | | | 0.8 | 2.1 | 9.3 | 26.5 | 46 |
| 6 Dec | Tecnè | 802 | 28.6 | 19.4 | 16.1 | 8.5 | 9.9 | 3.9 | 3.3 | 3.0 | 2.5 | | | | | 4.8 | 9.2 | 24.9 | 47 |
| 5–6 Dec | Eumetra | 800 | 28.5 | 19.3 | 16.0 | 9.4 | 7.5 | 3.9 | 3.1 | 3.4 | 2.6 | 1.8 | | | 1.0 | 3.5 | 9.2 | 25.3 | 46.4 |
| 29 Nov – 4 Dec | SWG | 1,200 | 28.1 | 19.3 | 16.7 | 9.2 | 7.3 | 3.8 | 3.2 | 3.4 | 2.7 | 1.8 | 1.4 | | 1.0 | 2.1 | 8.8 | 25.4 | 45.6 |
| 30 Nov – 1 Dec | Tecnè | 1,000 | 28.8 | 19.4 | 16.1 | 8.6 | 9.9 | 3.8 | 3.0 | 3.3 | 2.5 | | | | | 4.6 | 9.4 | 25.2 | 47.3 |
| 30 Nov | Proger Index | 800 | 29.4 | 19.4 | 16.8 | 9.2 | 6.7 | 4.0 | 3.1 | 3.8 | 2.5 | 1.6 | | | | 3.5 | 10.0 | 25.7 | 45.3 |
| 29–30 Nov | Quorum | 803 | 29.2 | 19.0 | 13.8 | 9.8 | 6.3 | 3.7 | 3.1 | 3.4 | 2.5 | 1.8 | | | 1.7 | 5.6 | 10.2 | 24.9 | 47 |
| 29–30 Nov | Termometro Politico | 4,000 | 29.6 | 19.3 | 16.2 | 9.5 | 6.3 | 3.8 | 2.7 | 3.0 | 2.5 | 1.9 | 1.6 | 1.5 | | 2.1 | 10.3 | 24.8 | 45.4 |
| 26–30 Nov | Lab2101 | 1,000 | 29.2 | 19.9 | 16.1 | 10.6 | 5.7 | 3.9 | 3.0 | 4.3 | 2.4 | 2.4 | | | 0.6 | 1.9 | 9.3 | 26.6 | 46.1 |
| 28–29 Nov | Eumetra | 800 | 28.5 | 19.2 | 16.5 | 9.3 | 7.4 | 3.9 | 3.2 | 3.5 | 2.5 | 1.8 | | | 1.0 | 3.2 | 9.3 | 25.2 | 46.2 |
| 22–27 Nov | SWG | 1,200 | 28.6 | 19.4 | 16.4 | 9.4 | 7.0 | 3.8 | 3.3 | 3.6 | 2.6 | 1.6 | 1.4 | | 1.1 | 1.8 | 9.2 | 25.6 | 46.1 |
| 23–24 Nov | Tecnè | 1,001 | 28.6 | 19.4 | 16.4 | 8.6 | 10.0 | 3.9 | 3.1 | 3.2 | 2.4 | | | | | 4.4 | 9.2 | 25 | 47.2 |
| 23 Nov | Proger Index | 800 | 29.7 | 19.4 | 16.6 | 9.3 | 6.5 | 4.0 | 3.0 | 3.7 | 2.6 | 1.7 | | | | 3.5 | 10.3 | 25.7 | 45.5 |
| 22–23 Nov | Quorum | 801 | 30.1 | 19.0 | 13.6 | 9.6 | 6.1 | 3.9 | 2.4 | 3.4 | 2.3 | 1.8 | | | 1.9 | 5.9 | 11.1 | 24.7 | 47.7 |
| 22–23 Nov | Termometro Politico | 3,600 | 29.5 | 19.6 | 16.0 | 9.7 | 6.4 | 3.7 | 2.5 | 3.1 | 2.5 | 2.0 | 1.5 | 1.5 | | 2.0 | 9.9 | 25.2 | 45.6 |
| 20–23 Nov | BiDiMedia | 1,100 | 28.3 | 19.6 | 15.6 | 9.5 | 6.4 | 4.1 | 2.9 | 3.3 | 2.5 | 1.9 | 1.4 | 1.1 | 0.7 | 2.8 0.9 – Popular Alternative; 1.9 – Others | 8.7 | 25.4 | 44.9 |
| 16–23 Nov | Lab2101 | 1,000 | 29.2 | 19.8 | 16.3 | 10.7 | 5.7 | 3.7 | 3.1 | 4.3 | 2.5 | 2.4 | | | 0.6 | 1.7 | 9.4 | 26.6 | 46.2 |
| 21–22 Nov | Eumetra | 800 | 28.7 | 19.2 | 16.6 | 9.3 | 7.3 | 3.9 | 2.9 | 3.4 | 2.7 | 2.1 | | | 0.9 | 3.1 | 9.5 | 25.3 | 46.2 |
| 15–20 Nov | SWG | 1,200 | 29.0 | 19.4 | 16.6 | 9.6 | 6.9 | 3.7 | 3.1 | 3.5 | 2.8 | 1.7 | 1.2 | | 1.0 | 1.5 | 9.6 | 25.7 | 46.5 |
| 16–17 Nov | Tecnè | 1,001 | 28.5 | 19.8 | 16.1 | 8.5 | 9.9 | 4.0 | 3.0 | 3.2 | 2.4 | | | | | 4.6 | 8.7 | 25.4 | 46.9 |
| 16 Nov | Euromedia | 800 | 28.5 | 18.9 | 16.8 | 8.8 | 7.8 | 4.4 | 3.0 | 3.4 | 2.5 | 2.6 | | | 0.6 | 2.7 | 9.6 | 24.8 | 45.7 |
| 16 Nov | Proger Index | 800 | 29.8 | 19.8 | 16.3 | 9.5 | 6.1 | 4.1 | 2.7 | 3.9 | 2.6 | 1.8 | | | | 3.4 | 10.0 | 26.3 | 45.4 |
| 14–16 Nov | Termometro Politico | 3,900 | 29.2 | 19.5 | 16.2 | 9.6 | 6.6 | 3.7 | 2.6 | 3.0 | 2.3 | 2.2 | 1.6 | 1.5 | | 2.0 | 9.7 | 24.8 | 45.4 |
| 14–16 Nov | Winpoll | 1,500 | 27.7 | 21.0 | 15.8 | 8.4 | 7.6 | 4.0 | 2.8 | 3.7 | 2.3 | 1.4 | 0.6 | | | 4.7 | 6.7 | 27 | 43.7 |
| 9–16 Nov | Lab2101 | 1,000 | 29.1 | 19.7 | 16.4 | 10.8 | 5.6 | 3.6 | 3.2 | 4.2 | 2.4 | 2.5 | | | 0.5 | 2.0 | 9.4 | 26.3 | 46 |
| 14–15 Nov | Eumetra | 800 | 28.6 | 19.3 | 16.5 | 9.2 | 7.2 | 3.8 | 3.1 | 3.5 | 2.6 | 2.0 | | | 1.1 | 3.1 | 9.3 | 25.4 | 46.1 |
| 8–13 Nov | SWG | 1,200 | 29.1 | 19.7 | 16.2 | 9.4 | 6.7 | 3.9 | 3.0 | 3.6 | 2.5 | 1.9 | 1.2 | | 1.1 | 1.7 | 9.4 | 25.8 | 46.3 |
| 9–10 Nov | Tecnè | 1,000 | 28.6 | 19.4 | 16.3 | 8.7 | 10.0 | 3.8 | 3.0 | 3.3 | 2.4 | | | | | 4.5 | 9.2 | 25.1 | 47.3 |
| 7–9 Nov | Quorum | 804 | 29.5 | 19.6 | 13.7 | 9.3 | 5.5 | 4.4 | 2.5 | 3.3 | 2.5 | 2.3 | | | 1.9 | 5.5 | 9.9 | 25.4 | 46.2 |
| 7–9 Nov | Ipsos | 1,000 | 28.5 | 18.0 | 17.0 | 9.2 | 7.8 | 3.1 | 3.5 | 3.5 | 2.6 | 2.0 | 1.2 | 1.2 | 1.1 | 1.3 | 10.5 | 24.1 | 46.6 |
| 6–9 Nov | Demos & Pi | 1,006 | 28.4 | 20.3 | 16.7 | 7.7 | 7.2 | 3.2 | 3.0 | 3.5 | 2.8 | | | | | 7.2 | 8.1 | 26.6 | 43.3 |
| 8 Nov | Eumetra | 800 | 28.8 | 19.5 | 16.6 | 9.4 | 6.9 | 4.0 | 2.9 | 3.4 | 2.4 | 1.9 | | | 0.9 | 3.3 | 9.3 | 25.3 | 46 |
| 3–8 Nov | Lab2101 | 1,000 | 29.2 | 19.5 | 16.6 | 10.7 | 5.7 | 3.7 | 3.5 | 4.1 | 2.5 | 2.6 | | | 0.4 | 1.5 | 9.7 | 26.1 | 46 |
| 7 Nov | Noto | – | 28.5 | 20.0 | 17.5 | 9.5 | 7.0 | 3.5 | 3.0 | 3.5 | 2.0 | | | | 1.5 | 4.0 | 8.5 | 25.5 | 46.5 |
| 31 Oct – 6 Nov | SWG | 1,200 | 29.2 | 20.0 | 16.4 | 9.8 | 6.4 | 4.0 | 2.8 | 3.6 | 2.4 | 1.6 | 1.3 | | 1.0 | 1.5 | 9.2 | 26 | 46.4 |
| 2–4 Nov | BiDiMedia | 1,000 | 29.1 | 19.3 | 16.0 | 9.5 | 6.3 | 4.0 | 2.7 | 3.2 | 2.5 | 1.7 | 1.2 | 1.0 | 0.8 | 2.7 1.0 – Popular Alternative; 1.7 – Others | 9.8 | 25 | 45.7 |
| 2–3 Nov | Tecnè | 1,000 | 28.7 | 19.6 | 16.0 | 9.0 | 10.1 | 3.7 | 2.8 | 3.2 | 2.3 | | | | | 4.6 | 9.1 | 25.1 | 47.8 |
| 27 Oct – 3 Nov | Ixè | 1,000 | 29.7 | 19.4 | 16.9 | 8.1 | 7.0 | 3.4 | 2.5 | 3.8 | 2.1 | 2.0 | | | 0.9 | 2.8 | 10.3 | 25.3 | 45.7 |
| 2 Nov | Euromedia | 800 | 28.0 | 19.0 | 17.0 | 8.4 | 7.9 | 4.2 | 3.3 | 3.5 | 2.5 | 2.5 | | | 0.5 | 3.2 | 9.0 | 25 | 44.8 |
| 31 Oct – 2 Nov | Quorum | 802 | 29.5 | 19.2 | 14.2 | 9.5 | 6.0 | 4.2 | 2.6 | 3.2 | 2.4 | 2.2 | | | 1.8 | 5.2 | 10.3 | 24.8 | 46.8 |
| 26 Oct – 2 Nov | Lab2101 | 1,000 | 29.4 | 19.3 | 16.7 | 10.6 | 5.5 | 3.9 | 3.4 | 4.0 | 2.4 | 2.5 | | | 0.5 | 1.8 | 10.1 | 25.7 | 46 |
| 31 Oct – 1 Nov | Eumetra | 800 | 28.9 | 19.9 | 16.2 | 9.7 | 6.5 | 3.7 | 2.9 | 3.4 | 2.2 | 2.0 | | | 1.0 | 3.6 | 9.0 | 25.5 | 46.1 |
| 25–30 Oct | SWG | 1,200 | 29.0 | 20.2 | 16.1 | 10.2 | 6.2 | 3.7 | 2.8 | 3.5 | 2.2 | 1.8 | 1.4 | | 1.0 | 1.9 | 8.8 | 25.9 | 46.4 |
| 27 Oct | Proger Index | 800 | 29.8 | 19.5 | 16.7 | 10.0 | 6.1 | 4.2 | 2.6 | 3.7 | 2.6 | 1.7 | | | | 3.1 | 10.3 | 25.8 | 45.9 |
| 27 Oct | EMG | – | 27.7 | 19.2 | 16.3 | 9.0 | 7.9 | 3.8 | 4.0 | 3.0 | 2.5 | 2.8 | 1.0 | | 1.3 | 1.5 | 8.5 | 24.7 | 45.9 |
| 26–27 Oct | Tecnè | 1,000 | 28.7 | 19.8 | 16.2 | 9.2 | 10.0 | 3.6 | 2.5 | 3.2 | 2.2 | | | | | 4.6 | 8.9 | 25.2 | 47.9 |
| 26 Oct | Euromedia | 800 | 28.5 | 19.2 | 16.9 | 8.0 | 7.7 | 4.2 | 3.2 | 3.3 | 2.5 | 2.4 | | | 0.5 | 3.6 | 9.3 | 25 | 44.7 |
| 24–26 Oct | Quorum | 802 | 29.4 | 19.5 | 14.4 | 9.2 | 5.9 | 4.5 | 2.8 | 3.3 | 2.3 | 2.3 | | | 1.5 | 4.9 | 9.9 | 25.1 | 46 |
| 24–25 Oct | Eumetra | 800 | 28.6 | 19.6 | 16.5 | 9.6 | 6.8 | 3.9 | 2.8 | 3.4 | 2.4 | 2.0 | | | 0.8 | 3.6 | 9.0 | 25.4 | 45.8 |
| 20–25 Oct | Lab2101 | 1,000 | 29.6 | 19.2 | 16.6 | 11.1 | 5.5 | 3.8 | 3.4 | 3.9 | 2.5 | 2.3 | | | 0.6 | 1.5 | 10.4 | 25.6 | 46.8 |
| 23 Oct | Euromedia | 800 | 29.0 | 19.5 | 16.8 | 8.5 | 7.3 | 4.0 | 3.1 | 2.8 | 2.5 | 2.3 | | | 0.5 | 3.7 | 9.5 | 24.8 | 45.3 |
| 22–23 Oct | Lombardy 06 by-election (CDX hold); provincial elections in Trentino-Alto Adige/Südtirol (CDX/SVP hold) | | | | | | | | | | | | | | | | | | |
| 18–23 Oct | SWG | 1,200 | 28.7 | 19.8 | 16.4 | 10.2 | 6.3 | 3.9 | 2.7 | 3.5 | 2.4 | 1.6 | 1.5 | | 1.0 | 2.0 | 8.9 | 25.7 | 46.2 |
| 19–20 Oct | Tecnè | 1,000 | 29.0 | 19.7 | 16.1 | 9.3 | 10.0 | 3.5 | 2.4 | 3.3 | 2.1 | | | | | 4.6 | 9.3 | 25.1 | 48.3 |
| 18–20 Oct | Termometro Politico | 4,000 | 29.7 | 19.2 | 16.0 | 9.8 | 6.1 | 3.7 | 2.5 | 2.8 | 2.6 | 2.3 | 1.7 | 1.6 | | 2.0 | 10.5 | 24.6 | 45.6 |
| 18–20 Oct | Quorum | 800 | 29.8 | 19.9 | 14.5 | 9.0 | 6.1 | 4.2 | 2.9 | 3.4 | 2.2 | 2.1 | | | 1.2 | 4.7 | 9.9 | 25.5 | 46.1 |
| 19 Oct | Euromedia | 800 | 28.4 | 19.3 | 17.1 | 8.8 | 7.0 | 4.0 | 3.1 | 3.0 | 2.6 | 2.3 | | | 0.6 | 3.8 | 9.1 | 24.9 | 44.8 |
| 18–19 Oct | Proger Index | 800 | 29.6 | 19.6 | 17.0 | 10.1 | 6.0 | 4.1 | 2.5 | 3.8 | 2.5 | 1.7 | | | | 3.1 | 10.0 | 25.9 | 45.7 |
| 15–19 Oct | Lab2101 | 1,000 | 29.3 | 19.3 | 16.4 | 11.2 | 5.8 | 3.6 | 3.4 | 4.0 | 2.4 | 2.5 | | | 0.5 | 1.6 | 10.0 | 25.7 | 46.8 |
| 17–18 Oct | EMG | – | 27.2 | 19.0 | 16.0 | 9.5 | 7.6 | 4.1 | 4.2 | 3.3 | 2.6 | 2.7 | 1.0 | | 1.2 | 1.6 | 8.2 | 24.9 | 45.5 |
| 17–18 Oct | Demopolis | 2,000 | 29.0 | 20.0 | 16.2 | 9.8 | 6.5 | 3.7 | | 3.4 | | | | | | 4.7 | 9.0 | 23.4 | 45.3 |
| 17–18 Oct | Eumetra | 800 | 28.3 | 19.4 | 16.3 | 9.7 | 7.0 | 4.1 | 2.8 | 3.7 | 2.5 | 1.8 | | | 1.1 | 3.3 | 8.9 | 25.6 | 46.1 |
| 17 Oct | Noto | – | 28.0 | 19.5 | 17.5 | 10.5 | 7.5 | 3.0 | 3.0 | 3.0 | 2.0 | | | | 1.5 | 4.5 | 8.5 | 24.5 | 47.5 |
| 17 Oct | Piepoli | – | 29.0 | 20.0 | 16.0 | 8.5 | 6.0 | 4.0 | 3.5 | 4.0 | 2.5 | 2.0 | | | 1.5 | 3.0 | 9.0 | 26.5 | 45 |
| 13–17 Oct | Quorum | 803 | 30.0 | 19.9 | 14.4 | 8.8 | 6.3 | 3.8 | 3.1 | 3.6 | 2.2 | 2.3 | | | 1.3 | 4.3 | 10.1 | 25.7 | 46.4 |
| 11–16 Oct | SWG | 1,200 | 28.4 | 19.6 | 16.1 | 10.2 | 6.4 | 4.0 | 2.5 | 3.6 | 2.5 | 1.8 | 1.4 | | 1.0 | 2.5 | 8.8 | 25.7 | 46 |
| 12–13 Oct | Tecnè | 1,000 | 28.8 | 19.6 | 16.3 | 9.2 | 10.1 | 3.6 | 2.3 | 3.2 | 2.2 | | | | | 4.7 | 9.2 | 25 | 48.1 |
| 11–12 Oct | Quorum | 802 | 29.6 | 19.7 | 14.9 | 9.3 | 6.3 | 3.6 | 2.7 | 3.7 | 2.2 | 2.2 | | | 0.9 | 4.9 | 9.9 | 25.6 | 46.1 |
| 10–12 Oct | Termometro Politico | 3,800 | 29.8 | 19.0 | 16.3 | 9.6 | 6.4 | 3.6 | 2.6 | 2.9 | 2.6 | 2.3 | 1.5 | 1.5 | | 1.9 | 10.8 | 24.5 | 45.8 |
| 10–11 Oct | Eumetra | 800 | 28.4 | 19.6 | 16.6 | 9.8 | 7.0 | 3.8 | 2.9 | 3.5 | 2.3 | 1.8 | | | 0.9 | 3.4 | 8.8 | 25.4 | 46.1 |
| 7–11 Oct | Lab2101 | 1,000 | 29.3 | 19.4 | 16.6 | 11.1 | 5.9 | 3.7 | 3.4 | 3.9 | 2.3 | 2.6 | | | 0.4 | 1.4 | 9.9 | 25.6 | 46.7 |
| 4–9 Oct | SWG | 1,200 | 28.7 | 19.8 | 16.5 | 10.3 | 6.4 | 3.7 | 2.5 | 3.3 | 2.4 | 1.7 | 1.6 | | | 3.1 | 8.9 | 25.5 | 45.4 |
| 6 Oct | Piepoli | – | 28.5 | 20.0 | 16.5 | 9.5 | 6.0 | 3.5 | 3.0 | 4.0 | 2.5 | 2.0 | | | 1.5 | 3.0 | 8.5 | 26.5 | 45.5 |
| 5–6 Oct | Tecnè | 1,000 | 28.7 | 19.4 | 16.5 | 9.0 | 10.2 | 3.7 | 2.3 | 3.3 | 2.3 | | | | | 4.6 | 9.3 | 25 | 47.9 |
| 4–5 Oct | Quorum | 802 | 29.7 | 19.5 | 15.2 | 9.3 | 6.0 | 3.7 | 3.0 | 4.2 | 2.3 | 2.3 | | | 0.7 | 4.1 | 10.2 | 26 | 45.7 |
| 3–5 Oct | Ipsos | 1,000 | 29.8 | 18.5 | 16.9 | 10.1 | 7.0 | 3.2 | 3.0 | 3.4 | 2.0 | 2.0 | 1.4 | 0.9 | 1.1 | 0.7 | 11.3 | 23.9 | 48 |
| 29 Sep – 5 Oct | Lab2101 | 1,000 | 29.1 | 19.6 | 16.8 | 10.9 | 6.1 | 3.8 | 3.3 | 3.7 | 2.3 | 2.6 | | | 0.4 | 1.4 | 9.5 | 25.6 | 46.5 |
| 4 Oct | Proger Index | 800 | 29.8 | 20.0 | 16.8 | 9.8 | 5.9 | 4.0 | 2.5 | 3.7 | 2.6 | 1.9 | | | | 3.0 | 9.8 | 26.3 | 45.5 |
| 3–4 Oct | EMG | – | 27.4 | 20.1 | 15.6 | 9.3 | 6.6 | 4.7 | 4.1 | 3.0 | 2.7 | 2.9 | 0.9 | | 1.4 | 1.3 | 7.3 | 25.8 | 44.7 |
| 29 Sep – 3 Oct | Winpoll | 1,000 | 27.3 | 20.8 | 15.4 | 8.9 | 8.0 | 4.2 | 2.6 | 3.9 | 2.1 | 1.2 | 0.7 | | | 4.9 | 6.5 | 26.8 | 44.2 |
| 27 Sep – 3 Oct | Ixè | 1,000 | 29.9 | 20.6 | 16.6 | 8.5 | 6.8 | 3.9 | 2.1 | 3.6 | 2.7 | 2.1 | | | 0.9 | 2.3 | 9.3 | 26.9 | 46.1 |
| 2 Oct | Euromedia | 800 | 28.0 | 19.4 | 17.0 | 9.6 | 6.9 | 4.1 | 3.3 | 3.0 | 2.5 | 2.4 | | | 0.6 | 3.2 | 8.6 | 24.9 | 45.1 |
| 1–2 Oct | Tecnè | 1,005 | 28.6 | 19.4 | 16.4 | 9.1 | 10.1 | 3.7 | 2.3 | 3.3 | 2.2 | | | | | 4.9 | 9.2 | 24.9 | 47.8 |
| 27 Sep – 2 Oct | SWG | 1,200 | 29.1 | 19.5 | 16.7 | 9.8 | 6.5 | 3.9 | 2.4 | 3.4 | 2.6 | 1.8 | 1.5 | | | 2.8 | 9.6 | 25.5 | 45.4 |
| 28–29 Sep | Tecnè | 1,001 | 28.5 | 19.3 | 16.6 | 9.0 | 10.1 | 3.6 | 2.4 | 3.3 | 2.4 | | | | | 4.8 | 9.2 | 25 | 47.6 |
| 27–29 Sep | Termometro Politico | 4,000 | 29.7 | 19.3 | 16.5 | 9.5 | 6.3 | 3.5 | 2.4 | 3.0 | 2.4 | 2.5 | 1.5 | 1.5 | | 1.9 | 10.4 | 24.7 | 45.5 |
| 25–28 Sep | Lab2101 | 1,000 | 28.9 | 19.5 | 16.7 | 10.8 | 6.3 | 3.8 | 3.2 | 3.8 | 2.2 | 2.6 | | | 0.5 | 1.7 | 9.4 | 25.5 | 46.5 |
| 26–27 Sep | EMG | – | 27.2 | 20.0 | 15.9 | 9.6 | 6.4 | 4.6 | 4.0 | 2.8 | 2.7 | 2.8 | 1.1 | | 1.5 | 1.4 | 7.2 | 25.5 | 44.7 |
| 26–27 Sep | Eumetra | 800 | 28.9 | 19.7 | 16.8 | 9.8 | 6.7 | 3.9 | 2.9 | 3.4 | 2.5 | 1.6 | | | 0.7 | 3.1 | 9.2 | 25.6 | 46.1 |
| 25–26 Sep | Piepoli | 508 | 29.0 | 19.5 | 16.5 | 9.5 | 6.0 | 4.0 | 2.5 | 4.0 | 2.0 | 2.0 | | | 1.5 | 3.5 | 9.5 | 25.5 | 46 |
| 24–25 Sep | Tecnè | 1,000 | 28.4 | 19.3 | 16.6 | 9.1 | 10.0 | 3.6 | 2.4 | 3.5 | 2.3 | | | | | 4.8 | 9.1 | 25.1 | 47.5 |
| 20–25 Sep | SWG | 1,200 | 28.7 | 19.8 | 16.9 | 10.1 | 6.5 | 3.8 | 2.7 | 3.2 | 2.6 | 1.6 | 1.6 | | | 2.5 | 8.9 | 25.6 | 45.3 |
| 21–22 Sep | Tecnè | 1,000 | 28.4 | 19.4 | 16.4 | 9.0 | 10.1 | 3.7 | 2.3 | 3.4 | 2.4 | | | | | 4.9 | 9.0 | 25.2 | 47.5 |
| 21 Sep | Piepoli | – | 29.0 | 20.0 | 16.0 | 9.5 | 6.0 | 4.0 | 2.5 | 3.5 | 2.5 | 2.0 | | | 1.5 | 3.5 | 9.0 | 26 | 46 |
| 19–21 Sep | Quorum | 802 | 30.7 | 19.3 | 15.4 | 8.4 | 6.1 | 3.9 | 3.4 | 4.4 | 2.0 | 1.8 | | | 0.9 | 3.7 | 11.4 | 25.7 | 46.1 |
| 17–21 Sep | Lab2101 | 1,000 | 28.8 | 19.7 | 16.6 | 10.9 | 6.5 | 3.6 | 3.0 | 3.9 | 2.3 | 2.5 | | | 0.4 | 1.8 | 9.1 | 25.9 | 46.6 |
| 19–20 Sep | EMG | 1,274 | 27.5 | 20.0 | 15.9 | 9.3 | 6.5 | 4.6 | 3.9 | 2.6 | 2.4 | 2.9 | 1.0 | | 1.5 | 1.9 | 7.5 | 25 | 44.8 |
| 18–20 Sep | Termometro Politico | 4,000 | 29.5 | 19.6 | 16.1 | 9.3 | 6.6 | 3.6 | 2.5 | 2.8 | 2.5 | 2.7 | 1.5 | 1.5 | | 1.8 | 9.9 | 24.9 | 45.4 |
| 18–20 Sep | Demos & Pi | 1,010 | 28.6 | 20.4 | 17.2 | 7.8 | 6.6 | 4.0 | 2.4 | 3.6 | 2.6 | | | | | 6.8 | 8.2 | 26.6 | 43 |
| 19 Sep | Noto | – | 27.5 | 19.0 | 17.0 | 10.5 | 7.0 | 3.0 | 3.0 | 3.0 | 2.0 | | | | 1.5 | 6.5 | 8.5 | 24 | 46.5 |
| 19 Sep | Euromedia | 1,000 | 27.6 | 19.2 | 16.6 | 10.4 | 7.0 | 4.1 | 3.0 | 2.8 | 2.5 | 1.8 | | | 0.7 | 4.3 | 8.4 | 24.5 | 45.7 |
| 13–18 Sep | SWG | 1,200 | 28.8 | 19.8 | 17.2 | 9.8 | 6.3 | 3.7 | 2.8 | 3.4 | 2.4 | 1.8 | 1.7 | | | 2.3 | 9.0 | 25.6 | 44.9 |
| 14–15 Sep | Tecné | 1,002 | 28.2 | 19.8 | 16.1 | 9.0 | 10.1 | 3.8 | 2.2 | 3.5 | 2.5 | | | | | 4.8 | 8.4 | 25.8 | 47.3 |
| 12–14 Sep | Termometro Politico | 4,200 | 29.2 | 19.5 | 16.0 | 9.5 | 6.9 | 3.5 | 2.6 | 2.9 | 2.5 | 2.7 | 1.5 | 1.5 | | 1.7 | 9.7 | 24.9 | 45.6 |
| 11–14 Sep | Ixè | 1,000 | 30.4 | 20.8 | 17.1 | 7.4 | 5.9 | 3.6 | 2.7 | 4.4 | 1.8 | 2.0 | | | 1.4 | 2.5 | 9.6 | 27 | 45.1 |
| 12–13 Sep | Quorum | 802 | 31.2 | 19.1 | 15.2 | 8.0 | 5.9 | 3.9 | 3.5 | 4.5 | 2.0 | 1.9 | | | 1.0 | 3.8 | 12.1 | 25.6 | 46.1 |
| 12–13 Sep | EMG | 1,260 | 27.3 | 20.1 | 16.2 | 9.0 | 6.8 | 4.6 | 3.8 | 2.6 | 2.4 | 2.7 | 1.1 | | 1.5 | 1.9 | 7.2 | 25.1 | 44.6 |
| 11–13 Sep | Lab2101 | 1,000 | 29.0 | 20.0 | 16.3 | 10.7 | 6.8 | 3.8 | 2.8 | 3.8 | 2.4 | 2.3 | | | 0.5 | 1.6 | 9.0 | 26.2 | 47 |
| 11 Sep | Euromedia | 800 | 27.7 | 19.3 | 16.9 | 10.6 | 7.0 | 4.0 | 3.2 | 2.7 | 2.6 | 2.0 | | | 0.5 | 3.5 | 8.4 | 24.6 | 45.8 |
| 11 Sep | Tecné | 1,000 | 28.2 | 20.1 | 16.0 | 9.0 | 10.0 | 3.8 | 2.3 | 3.6 | 2.3 | | | | | 4.7 | 8.1 | 26 | 47.2 |
| 6–11 Sep | SWG | 1,200 | 28.5 | 19.7 | 17.4 | 9.6 | 6.4 | 3.8 | 2.6 | 3.3 | 2.7 | 1.9 | 1.7 | | | 2.4 | 8.8 | 25.7 | 44.5 |
| 8 Sep | Piepoli | – | 29.0 | 19.5 | 16.0 | 9.0 | 7.0 | 3.5 | 2.5 | 3.5 | 2.5 | 2.0 | | | 1.5 | 4.0 | 8.8 | 25.5 | 46.5 |
| 7–8 Sep | Tecné | 1,003 | 28.4 | 20.1 | 15.8 | 8.8 | 10.2 | 3.7 | 2.4 | 3.6 | 2.4 | | | | | 4.6 | 8.3 | 26.1 | 47.4 |
| 6–7 Sep | Quorum | 800 | 31.7 | 19.5 | 15.0 | 7.6 | 5.7 | 3.3 | 3.3 | 4.1 | 2.3 | 2.0 | | | 1.1 | 4.4 | 12.2 | 25.9 | 46.1 |
| 5–7 Sep | Ipsos | 1,000 | 30.2 | 19.5 | 16.4 | 8.1 | 6.6 | 3.5 | 3.3 | 3.7 | 2.2 | 2.2 | 1.1 | 1.0 | 1.0 | 1.2 | 10.7 | 25.4 | 45.9 |
| 5–7 Sep | Termometro Politico | 3,100 | 29.1 | 19.4 | 16.1 | 9.4 | 7.1 | 3.3 | 2.7 | 3.0 | 2.4 | 2.6 | 1.4 | 1.6 | | 1.9 | 9.7 | 24.8 | 45.6 |
| 2–7 Sep | Lab2101 | 1,000 | 29.1 | 20.1 | 16.1 | 10.6 | 7.0 | 3.7 | 2.8 | 3.7 | 2.5 | 2.4 | | | 0.4 | 1.6 | 9.0 | 26.3 | 47.1 |
| 3–4 Sep | Tecné | 1,005 | 28.3 | 20.3 | 15.6 | 8.9 | 10.1 | 3.6 | 2.5 | 3.5 | 2.5 | | | | | 4.7 | 8.0 | 26.3 | 47.3 |
| 30 Aug – 4 Sep | SWG | 1,200 | 28.2 | 20.1 | 16.9 | 9.4 | 6.4 | 3.5 | 2.8 | 3.3 | 2.6 | 2.2 | 1.9 | | | 2.7 | 8.1 | 26 | 44 |
| 31 Aug – 1 Sep | Tecné | 1,003 | 28.5 | 20.3 | 15.5 | 8.9 | 10.2 | 3.6 | 2.6 | 3.5 | 2.5 | | | | | 4.4 | 8.2 | 26.3 | 47.6 |
| 28 Aug – 1 Sep | Lab2101 | 1,000 | 29.0 | 20.2 | 16.0 | 10.6 | 7.1 | 3.8 | 2.9 | 3.6 | 2.5 | 2.3 | | | 0.6 | 1.4 | 8.8 | 26.3 | 47.3 |
| 30–31 Aug | Euromedia | 1,000 | 26.5 | 20.3 | 16.5 | 10.5 | 7.4 | 4.1 | 3.8 | 2.5 | 2.5 | 1.9 | | | 0.5 | 3.5 | 6.2 | 25.3 | 44.9 |
| 29–31 Aug | Quorum | 800 | 31.2 | 19.0 | 15.2 | 8.3 | 5.8 | 4.1 | 2.5 | 3.7 | 2.0 | 2.2 | | | 1.3 | 4.7 | 12.2 | 24.7 | 46.6 |
| 28–30 Aug | BiDiMedia | 1,005 | 29.1 | 20.2 | 15.8 | 9.3 | 6.4 | 3.8 | 2.6 | 3.2 | 2.8 | 1.8 | 1.4 | 1.0 | 0.7 | 1.9 | 8.9 | 26.2 | 45.5 |
| 22–24 Aug | Termometro Politico | 3,200 | 28.9 | 19.6 | 16.3 | 9.5 | 6.9 | 3.5 | 2.6 | 2.8 | 2.6 | 2.5 | 1.4 | 1.5 | | 1.9 | 9.3 | 25 | 45.3 |
| 1–20 Aug | Lab2101 | 2,000 | 29.1 | 20.0 | 15.9 | 10.4 | 7.3 | 3.9 | 2.7 | 3.7 | 2.8 | 2.4 | | | 0.5 | 1.3 | 9.1 | 26.5 | 47.3 |
| 10–17 Aug | Lab2101 | 1,000 | 29.2 | 20.1 | 15.9 | 10.3 | 7.1 | 3.8 | 2.6 | 3.6 | 2.7 | 2.4 | | | 0.6 | 1.7 | 9.1 | 26.4 | 47.2 |
| 8–9 Aug | Lab2101 | 1,000 | 29.4 | 20.2 | 15.8 | 10.2 | 7.3 | 3.9 | 2.7 | 3.4 | 2.6 | 2.6 | | | 0.7 | 1.2 | 9.2 | 26.2 | 47.6 |
| 5 Aug | Piepoli | – | 29.5 | 19.5 | 15.5 | 9.0 | 7.5 | 3.5 | 2.5 | 3.5 | 2.5 | 2.0 | | | 1.5 | 3.5 | 10.0 | 25.5 | 47.5 |
| 1–2 Aug | Demopolis | 1,500 | 28.8 | 20.2 | 15.9 | 9.3 | 7.0 | 3.4 | | 3.0 | | | | | 0.7 | 3.0 | 8.6 | 23.2 | 45.8 |
| 26–31 Jul | SWG | 1,200 | 29.4 | 20.0 | 16.3 | 9.7 | 7.2 | 3.4 | 2.5 | 3.0 | 2.4 | 2.2 | 1.7 | | | 2.2 | 9.4 | 25.4 | 46.3 |
| 27–28 Jul | Tecnè | 997 | 29.2 | 20.0 | 15.5 | 8.7 | 10.9 | 3.5 | 2.5 | 3.4 | 2.2 | | | | | 4.1 | 9.2 | 25.6 | 48.8 |
| 24–28 Jul | Lab2101 | 1,000 | 29.1 | 20.3 | 15.9 | 9.6 | 7.2 | 4.2 | 2.8 | 3.6 | 2.7 | 2.5 | | | 0.5 | 1.6 | 8.8 | 26.6 | 46.4 |
| 26–27 Jul | Termometro Politico | 3,800 | 29.2 | 19.7 | 16.2 | 9.1 | 7.3 | 3.6 | 2.5 | 3.0 | 2.4 | 2.3 | 1.5 | 1.5 | | 1.7 | 9.5 | 25.1 | 45.6 |
| 25–27 Jul | Ipsos | 1,000 | 30.4 | 19.3 | 16.3 | 8.4 | 6.0 | 3.9 | 3.0 | 4.1 | 2.7 | 1.7 | 1.1 | 0.8 | 1.2 | 1.1 | 11.1 | 26.1 | 46 |
| 26 Jul | Euromedia | 1,000 | 27.2 | 20.8 | 16.0 | 9.8 | 7.3 | 4.3 | 4.0 | 2.5 | 2.2 | 2.2 | | | 0.5 | 3.2 | 6.4 | 25.5 | 44.8 |
| 24–25 Jul | BiDiMedia | 1,000 | 28.2 | 20.1 | 15.5 | 9.2 | 7.4 | 3.4 | 2.8 | 3.2 | 2.5 | 1.9 | 1.4 | 1.1 | 0.7 | 2.6 | 8.1 | 25.8 | 45.5 |
| 19–24 Jul | SWG | 1,200 | 29.2 | 19.6 | 16.0 | 9.6 | 7.2 | 3.6 | 2.7 | 3.2 | 2.5 | 2.1 | 1.8 | | | 2.4 | 9.6 | 25.3 | 46 |
| 23 Jul | Noto | – | 28.5 | 20.0 | 16.0 | 8.0 | 8.0 | 4.0 | 2.5 | 3.0 | 1.5 | | | | 1.5 | 7.0 | 8.5 | 24.5 | 46 |
| 20–21 Jul | AnalisiPolitica | 1,000 | 29.1 | 20.2 | 15.8 | 9.1 | 7.8 | 3.8 | 2.8 | 2.4 | | | | | | 9.0 | 8.9 | 22.6 | 46 |
| 20–21 Jul | Tecnè | 1,000 | 28.8 | 20.2 | 15.4 | 8.7 | 11.1 | 3.4 | 2.6 | 3.3 | 2.3 | | | | | 4.2 | 8.6 | 25.8 | 48.6 |
| 18–20 Jul | Quorum | 802 | 29.6 | 19.4 | 15.5 | 8.9 | 6.0 | 3.6 | 2.9 | 3.9 | 2.9 | 2.1 | | | 1.1 | 4.1 | 10.2 | 26.2 | 45.6 |
| 18–20 Jul | Termometro Politico | 3,700 | 28.9 | 19.5 | 16.0 | 9.4 | 7.5 | 3.8 | 2.3 | 2.9 | 2.6 | 2.5 | 1.4 | 1.4 | | 1.8 | 9.4 | 25 | 45.8 |
| 15–20 Jul | Lab2101 | 1,000 | 29.2 | 20.4 | 15.8 | 9.4 | 7.5 | 4.3 | 2.9 | 3.7 | 2.6 | 2.4 | | | 0.6 | 1.2 | 8.8 | 26.7 | 46.7 |
| 19 Jul | Euromedia | 1,000 | 27.2 | 21.0 | 16.5 | 10.1 | 7.1 | 4.1 | 4.0 | 2.3 | 2.0 | 1.7 | | | 0.5 | 3.5 | 6.2 | 25.3 | 44.9 |
| 12–17 Jul | SWG | 1,200 | 28.7 | 20.0 | 15.9 | 9.8 | 7.5 | 3.4 | 2.9 | 3.1 | 2.6 | 2.2 | 1.8 | | | 2.1 | 8.7 | 25.7 | 46 |
| 14 Jul | Piepoli | – | 29.0 | 20.0 | 15.5 | 9.0 | 7.5 | 3.5 | 3.0 | 3.0 | 2.0 | 2.5 | | | 1.5 | 3.5 | 9.0 | 25 | 47 |
| 13–14 Jul | Tecnè | 998 | 29.0 | 20.1 | 15.5 | 8.7 | 11.0 | 3.5 | 2.5 | 3.2 | 2.4 | | | | | 4.1 | 8.9 | 25.7 | 48.7 |
| 11–14 Jul | Lab2101 | 1,000 | 29.6 | 20.1 | 15.3 | 9.1 | 7.7 | 4.2 | 2.8 | 3.6 | 2.5 | 2.3 | | | 0.5 | 2.3 | 9.5 | 26.2 | 46.9 |
| 11–13 Jul | Quorum | 805 | 30.3 | 19.5 | 15.5 | 8.8 | 6.0 | 3.5 | 2.7 | 4.0 | 2.7 | 1.8 | | | 1.0 | 4.2 | 10.8 | 26.2 | 46.1 |
| 11–13 Jul | Termometro Politico | 4,000 | 29.1 | 19.8 | 16.2 | 9.1 | 7.5 | 3.6 | 2.3 | 2.8 | 2.4 | 2.3 | 1.5 | 1.3 | | 2.1 | 9.3 | 25 | 45.7 |
| 5–10 Jul | SWG | 1,200 | 28.8 | 20.4 | 15.9 | 10.0 | 7.2 | 3.6 | 2.8 | 3.2 | 2.4 | 2.1 | 1.8 | | | 1.8 | 8.4 | 26 | 46 |
| 7–8 Jul | Euromedia | 1,000 | 27.4 | 20.8 | 16.3 | 9.8 | 7.0 | 4.2 | 3.9 | 2.5 | 2.0 | 2.0 | | | 0.5 | 3.6 | 6.6 | 25.3 | 44.7 |
| 6–7 Jul | Tecnè | 1,000 | 29.3 | 19.8 | 15.5 | 8.6 | 11.0 | 3.6 | 2.6 | 3.1 | 2.4 | | | | | 4.1 | 9.5 | 25.3 | 48.9 |
| 6 Jul | Piepoli | – | 29.5 | 19.5 | 16.0 | 8.5 | 8.0 | 4.0 | 3.5 | 3.0 | 2.0 | 2.5 | | | 1.5 | 2.0 | 10.0 | 24.5 | 47.5 |
| 5–6 Jul | Termometro Politico | 3,700 | 29.3 | 19.6 | 16.2 | 9.3 | 7.5 | 3.6 | 2.4 | 2.8 | 2.5 | 2.3 | 1.3 | 1.3 | | 1.9 | 9.7 | 24.9 | 46.1 |
| 4–6 Jul | Quorum | 805 | 29.7 | 19.8 | 15.7 | 8.5 | 6.1 | 3.5 | 2.4 | 3.7 | 2.8 | 1.8 | | | 1.3 | 4.7 | 9.9 | 26.3 | 45.6 |
| 1–5 Jul | Lab2101 | 1,000 | 30.2 | 19.8 | 14.9 | 8.8 | 7.6 | 4.1 | 2.7 | 3.4 | 2.4 | 2.2 | | | 0.4 | 3.5 | 10.4 | 25.6 | 47 |
| 28 Jun – 3 Jul | SWG | 1,200 | 28.3 | 20.1 | 16.3 | 9.6 | 7.5 | 3.7 | 3.0 | 3.3 | 2.6 | 1.9 | 1.7 | | | 2.0 | 8.2 | 26 | 45.4 |
| 28–30 Jun | Tecnè | 1,801 | 29.6 | 20.1 | 15.3 | 8.5 | 11.2 | 3.5 | 2.5 | 3.0 | 2.3 | | | | | 4.0 | 9.5 | 25.4 | 49.3 |
| 28–29 Jun | Demopolis | 2,000 | 29.0 | 21.0 | 15.4 | 9.0 | 7.5 | 3.4 | 2.2 | 3.0 | 1.5 | 1.6 | 1.5 | | | 4.9 | 8.0 | 25.5 | 45.5 |
| 27–29 Jun | Quorum | 802 | 29.4 | 20.1 | 15.4 | 8.6 | 6.9 | 3.3 | 2.7 | 3.5 | 2.5 | 1.7 | | | 1.6 | 4.3 | 9.3 | 26.1 | 46.5 |
| 27–29 Jun | Ipsos | 1,000 | 29.4 | 19.4 | 16.2 | 9.1 | 7.3 | 3.1 | 4.1 | 3.2 | 1.5 | 2.0 | 1.5 | 0.7 | 0.9 | 1.6 | 10.0 | 24.1 | 46.7 |
| 27–29 Jun | Termometro Politico | 3,700 | 29.3 | 19.9 | 15.9 | 9.1 | 7.7 | 3.5 | 2.5 | 2.7 | 2.4 | 2.4 | 1.3 | 1.3 | | 2.0 | 9.4 | 25 | 46.1 |
| 25–29 Jun | Lab2101 | 1,000 | 30.1 | 19.5 | 15.2 | 8.6 | 7.4 | 4.3 | 2.5 | 3.3 | 2.6 | 2.3 | | | 0.6 | 3.6 | 10.6 | 25.4 | 46.7 |
| 26–28 Jun | Demos & Pi | 1,005 | 29.0 | 20.6 | 15.2 | 8.0 | 7.8 | 3.7 | 2.6 | 3.3 | 2.5 | | | | | 7.3 | 8.4 | 26.4 | 44.8 |
| 27 Jun | Euromedia | 800 | 29.2 | 20.2 | 16.2 | 8.4 | 7.0 | 4.6 | 4.0 | 2.4 | 2.0 | 2.1 | | | 0.6 | 3.3 | 9.0 | 24.6 | 45.2 |
| 25–26 Jun | Regional elections in Molise (CDX hold) | | | | | | | | | | | | | | | | | | |
| 21–26 Jun | SWG | 1,200 | 28.6 | 20.3 | 16.3 | 9.3 | 7.1 | 3.5 | 3.1 | 3.3 | 2.3 | 2.1 | 1.7 | | | 2.4 | 8.3 | 25.9 | 45 |
| 23–24 Jun | BiDiMedia | 1,000 | 28.7 | 20.0 | 15.8 | 8.6 | 7.7 | 3.9 | 2.5 | 3.0 | 2.5 | 1.8 | 1.3 | 1.0 | 0.7 | 2.5 | 8.7 | 25.5 | 45.7 |
| 22–23 Jun | Tecnè | 1,000 | 29.5 | 20.0 | 15.3 | 8.4 | 11.5 | 3.4 | 2.5 | 3.1 | 2.2 | | | | | 4.1 | 9.5 | 25.3 | 49.4 |
| 20–23 Jun | Termometro Politico | 4,400 | 29.0 | 19.6 | 16.1 | 9.2 | 8.0 | 3.5 | 2.6 | 2.6 | 2.5 | 2.5 | 1.3 | 1.3 | | 1.8 | 9.4 | 24.7 | 46.2 |
| 22 Jun | Noto | – | 28.0 | 20.0 | 16.0 | 9.5 | 10.0 | 6.0 | | 2.5 | 2.0 | 2.0 | 1.5 | | 1.5 | 4.5 | 8.0 | 24.5 | 49 |
| 21–22 Jun | Quorum | 803 | 28.7 | 20.6 | 15.6 | 8.2 | 7.8 | 3.5 | 2.5 | 3.2 | 2.0 | 1.7 | | | 1.2 | 5.0 | 8.1 | 25.8 | 45.9 |
| 18–19 Jun | Tecné | 1,003 | 29.6 | 19.7 | 15.2 | 8.5 | 11.5 | 3.5 | 2.5 | 3.0 | 1.9 | | | | | 4.6 | 9.9 | 24.6 | 49.6 |
| 15–19 Jun | Ixè | 1,000 | 30.2 | 20.3 | 16.6 | 8.3 | 7.0 | 3.1 | 2.2 | 4.1 | 2.3 | 1.7 | | | 0.9 | 3.3 | 9.9 | 26.7 | 46.4 |
| 14–19 Jun | SWG | 1,200 | 28.9 | 20.5 | 16.0 | 9.1 | 7.2 | 3.7 | 2.9 | 3.2 | 2.5 | 2.2 | 1.5 | | 1.0 | 1.3 | 8.4 | 26.2 | 46.2 |
| 13–17 Jun | Lab2101 | 1,000 | 29.8 | 19.6 | 15.9 | 8.9 | 7.2 | 4.5 | 2.6 | 3.4 | 2.2 | 2.2 | | | 0.7 | 3.0 | 10.2 | 25.2 | 46.6 |
| 15–16 Jun | EMG | 1,268 | 28.0 | 20.0 | 14.6 | 9.2 | 8.9 | 3.3 | 3.2 | 2.4 | 3.0 | 2.0 | 1.5 | | 1.3 | 2.6 | 8.0 | 25.4 | 47.4 |
| 15–16 Jun | Tecnè | 1,000 | 29.5 | 19.8 | 15.2 | 8.4 | 11.8 | 3.5 | 2.5 | 3.0 | 2.0 | | | | | 4.3 | 9.7 | 24.8 | 49.7 |
| 12–15 Jun | Termometro Politico | 4,900 | 29.3 | 19.6 | 16.0 | 9.1 | 8.3 | 3.7 | 2.4 | 2.6 | 2.3 | 2.3 | 1.3 | 1.4 | | 1.7 | 9.7 | 24.5 | 46.7 |
| 15 Jun | Piepoli | – | 29.5 | 20.0 | 15.5 | 9.0 | 8.0 | 3.5 | 3.0 | 3.0 | 2.5 | 2.5 | | | 1.5 | 2.0 | 9.5 | 25.5 | 48 |
| 14 Jun | Euromedia | 1,000 | 28.8 | 21.3 | 15.0 | 8.7 | 9.5 | 4.1 | 3.6 | 2.4 | 1.9 | 2.0 | | | 0.5 | 2.2 | 7.5 | 25.6 | 47.5 |
| 13 Jun | Quorum | 801 | 28.0 | 20.7 | 15.9 | 7.2 | 9.6 | 2.9 | 2.1 | 3.6 | 1.9 | 1.6 | | | 1.2 | 5.3 | 7.3 | 26.2 | 46 |
| 13 Jun | Noto | – | 28.0 | 20.0 | 15.0 | 9.0 | 10.0 | 6.5 | | 3.5 | 2.5 | | | | 1.5 | 4.0 | 8.0 | 26 | 48.5 |
| 12 Jun | Winpoll | 1,000 | 28.7 | 21.3 | 14.4 | 7.1 | 13.3 | 3.5 | 2.0 | 3.1 | 1.8 | | 1.3 | | | 3.5 | 7.4 | 26.2 | 49.1 |
| 12 Jun | Former Prime Minister and Forza Italia president Silvio Berlusconi dies; state funeral held on 14 June | | | | | | | | | | | | | | | | | | |
| 7–12 Jun | SWG | 1,200 | 28.7 | 20.2 | 16.4 | 8.8 | 7.3 | 3.9 | 3.0 | 3.4 | 2.5 | 2.2 | 1.6 | | 1.0 | 1.0 | 8.5 | 26.1 | 45.8 |
| 8–9 Jun | Tecnè | 1,000 | 30.0 | 19.6 | 15.7 | 9.0 | 8.3 | 4.0 | 2.9 | 3.0 | 2.3 | | | | | 5.2 | 10.4 | 24.9 | 47.3 |
| 8 Jun | EMG | 1,211 | 27.5 | 19.9 | 15.2 | 10.0 | 7.4 | 3.2 | 3.2 | 2.3 | 3.4 | 2.2 | 1.7 | | 1.2 | 2.8 | 7.6 | 25.6 | 46.1 |
| 6–8 Jun | Termometro Politico | 3,600 | 29.7 | 19.3 | 15.9 | 9.0 | 7.8 | 3.6 | 2.5 | 2.6 | 2.4 | 2.3 | 1.4 | 1.4 | | 2.1 | 10.4 | 24.3 | 46.5 |
| 6 Jun | Euromedia | 1,000 | 29.2 | 21.2 | 16.4 | 9.0 | 6.5 | 4.3 | 3.8 | 2.5 | 1.9 | 2.4 | | | 0.7 | 2.1 | 8.0 | 25.6 | 45.4 |
| 6 Jun | Noto | – | 28.5 | 20.5 | 15.0 | 9.5 | 7.0 | 6.5 | | 3.5 | 2.0 | | | | 1.5 | 6.0 | 8.0 | 26 | 46.5 |
| 4–5 Jun | Tecné | 1,000 | 30.0 | 19.8 | 15.5 | 9.0 | 8.2 | 4.0 | 3.0 | 3.2 | 2.1 | | | | | 5.2 | 10.2 | 25.1 | 47.2 |
| 30 May – 5 Jun | SWG | 1,200 | 29.1 | 20.4 | 16.1 | 9.0 | 7.0 | 3.8 | 2.7 | 3.6 | 2.4 | 2.2 | 1.5 | | 1.0 | 1.2 | 8.7 | 26.4 | 46.1 |
| 31 May – 3 Jun | BiDiMedia | 1,128 | 28.9 | 20.1 | 15.4 | 9.5 | 6.4 | 4.5 | 2.6 | 3.0 | 2.6 | 1.7 | 1.3 | 1.0 | 0.9 | 2.1 | 8.8 | 25.7 | 45.7 |
| 1 Jun | EMG | 1,385 | 27.8 | 20.3 | 15.4 | 10.0 | 7.1 | 3.2 | 3.2 | 2.4 | 3.1 | 2.3 | 1.5 | | 1.0 | 2.7 | 7.5 | 25.8 | 45.9 |
| 31 May – 1 Jun | Quorum | 801 | 29.7 | 21.0 | 16.0 | 7.5 | 6.7 | 3.0 | 1.9 | 3.5 | 2.0 | 1.8 | | | 1.2 | 5.7 | 8.7 | 26.5 | 45.1 |
| 31 May – 1 Jun | Tecnè | 1,000 | 30.0 | 19.8 | 15.4 | 8.9 | 8.3 | 4.2 | 3.0 | 3.1 | 2.2 | | | | | 5.1 | 10.2 | 25.1 | 47.2 |
| 30 May – 1 Jun | Termometro Politico | 3,700 | 29.4 | 19.3 | 16.2 | 9.3 | 7.6 | 3.8 | 2.5 | 2.4 | 2.5 | 2.3 | 1.4 | 1.4 | | 1.9 | 10.1 | 24.2 | 46.3 |
| 26 May – 1 Jun | Lab2101 | 1,000 | 29.8 | 19.3 | 16.1 | 9.5 | 6.8 | 4.9 | 2.4 | 3.2 | 2.2 | 2.2 | | | 0.7 | 2.9 | 10.5 | 24.7 | 46.8 |
| 30 May | Piepoli | – | 29.5 | 19.5 | 15.5 | 9.0 | 7.5 | 4.5 | 3.0 | 3.0 | 2.5 | 2.5 | | | 1.5 | 2.0 | 10.0 | 25 | 47.5 |
| 28–29 May | Runoff of 14–15 May local elections | | | | | | | | | | | | | | | | | | |
| 24–29 May | SWG | 1,200 | 29.1 | 21.0 | 16.3 | 9.1 | 6.6 | 4.0 | 2.8 | 3.4 | 2.4 | 2.0 | 1.4 | | 1.0 | 0.9 | 8.1 | 26.8 | 45.8 |
| 25–26 May | Tecnè | 1,000 | 29.7 | 20.0 | 15.5 | 9.0 | 8.2 | 4.3 | 2.8 | 2.9 | 2.3 | | | | | 5.3 | 9.7 | 25.2 | 46.9 |
| 25 May | EMG | 1,435 | 28.1 | 20.6 | 15.4 | 9.7 | 6.7 | 3.3 | 3.3 | 2.1 | 2.8 | 2.4 | 1.3 | | 1.1 | 3.2 | 7.5 | 25.5 | 45.6 |
| 25 May | Noto | – | 28.0 | 21.5 | 14.0 | 9.5 | 7.0 | 6.5 | | 3.0 | 2.0 | | | | 1.5 | 7.0 | 6.5 | 26.5 | 46 |
| 23–25 May | Ipsos | 1,000 | 29.6 | 20.4 | 15.0 | 8.2 | 7.7 | 3.5 | 3.0 | 3.5 | 1.8 | 2.4 | 1.2 | 0.9 | 1.0 | 1.8 | 9.2 | 25.7 | 46.5 |
| 23–25 May | Termometro Politico | 3,900 | 29.7 | 19.3 | 16.0 | 9.3 | 7.4 | 4.1 | 2.4 | 2.5 | 2.3 | 2.5 | 1.4 | 1.4 | | 1.7 | 10.4 | 24.1 | 46.4 |
| 22–25 May | Lab2101 | 1,000 | 29.4 | 19.7 | 16.4 | 9.3 | 6.7 | 5.1 | 2.6 | 3.4 | 2.4 | 2.3 | | | 0.6 | 2.1 | 9.7 | 25.5 | 46 |
| 23 May | Piepoli | – | 29.5 | 19.5 | 16.0 | 9.5 | 7.0 | 4.5 | 3.0 | 2.5 | 3.0 | 2.5 | | | 1.5 | 1.5 | 10.0 | 25 | 47.5 |
| 17–22 May | SWG | 1,200 | 29.7 | 20.9 | 16.0 | 8.8 | 6.7 | 4.3 | 2.7 | 3.5 | 2.2 | 2.0 | 1.6 | | | 1.6 | 8.8 | 26.6 | 45.2 |
| 19 May | Euromedia | 1,000 | 29.6 | 20.8 | 16.5 | 9.2 | 6.5 | 4.5 | 3.7 | 2.5 | 1.8 | 2.3 | | | 0.6 | 2.0 | 8.8 | 25.1 | 45.9 |
| 18–19 May | Tecnè | 1,000 | 29.4 | 19.8 | 15.7 | 9.1 | 8.3 | 4.3 | 2.7 | 3.0 | 2.4 | | | | | 5.3 | 9.6 | 25.2 | 46.8 |
| 15–19 May | Lab2101 | 1,000 | 29.1 | 19.9 | 16.1 | 9.6 | 6.8 | 5.3 | 2.7 | 3.3 | 2.2 | 2.4 | | | 0.8 | 1.8 | 9.2 | 25.4 | 46.3 |
| 17–18 May | Quorum | 801 | 29.4 | 21.3 | 16.1 | 8.2 | 6.5 | 3.4 | 2.4 | 3.1 | 1.8 | 1.6 | | | 1.2 | 5.0 | 8.1 | 26.2 | 45.3 |
| 16–18 May | Termometro Politico | 4,200 | 29.5 | 19.0 | 16.0 | 9.4 | 7.6 | 4.0 | 2.4 | 2.5 | 2.2 | 2.5 | 1.3 | 1.4 | | 2.2 | 10.5 | 23.7 | 46.5 |
| 17 May | Piepoli | – | 30.0 | 19.0 | 16.0 | 9.0 | 7.0 | 4.0 | 2.5 | 2.5 | 2.5 | 2.5 | | | 1.5 | 3.5 | 11.0 | 24 | 47.5 |
| 16–17 May | Noto | 1,000 | 27.5 | 21.0 | 14.0 | 10.0 | 6.5 | 4.5 | 3.0 | 3.0 | 2.0 | | | | 1.5 | 7.0 | 6.5 | 26 | 45.5 |
| 14–15 May | Local elections | | | | | | | | | | | | | | | | | | |
| 10–15 May | SWG | 1,200 | 29.8 | 21.3 | 15.8 | 8.6 | 6.8 | 4.1 | 2.7 | 3.4 | 2.4 | 1.9 | 1.4 | | | 1.8 | 8.5 | 27.1 | 45.2 |
| 11–12 May | Tecnè | 1,000 | 29.3 | 19.6 | 15.9 | 9.0 | 8.5 | 4.5 | 2.6 | 2.9 | 2.3 | | | | | 5.4 | 9.7 | 24.8 | 46.8 |
| 9–12 May | Lab2101 | 1,000 | 29.3 | 20.2 | 15.6 | 9.9 | 6.8 | 5.4 | 2.3 | 3.1 | 2.2 | 2.5 | | | 0.5 | 2.2 | 9.1 | 25.5 | 46.5 |
| 11 May | EMG | 1,428 | 28.0 | 20.5 | 16.1 | 9.6 | 6.5 | 3.7 | 3.1 | 2.5 | 2.5 | 2.6 | 0.9 | | 1.0 | 3.0 | 7.5 | 25.5 | 45.1 |
| 9–11 May | Termometro Politico | 4,200 | 29.3 | 19.2 | 16.1 | 9.3 | 7.5 | 4.3 | 2.3 | 2.3 | 2.4 | 2.3 | 1.3 | 1.5 | | 2.2 | 10.1 | 23.9 | 46.1 |
| 10 May | Proger Index | 800 | 29.5 | 20.6 | 15.7 | 9.0 | 6.6 | 4.2 | 2.7 | 3.3 | 2.5 | 1.9 | | | | 4.2 | 8.9 | 26.4 | 45.1 |
| 8 May | Euromedia | 1,000 | 28.8 | 19.6 | 16.2 | 9.6 | 6.8 | 4.6 | 3.5 | 2.5 | 2.2 | 2.4 | | | 0.8 | 3.0 | 9.2 | 24.3 | 46 |
| 3–8 May | SWG | 1,200 | 29.5 | 21.1 | 15.6 | 9.0 | 6.6 | 4.1 | 2.8 | 3.3 | 2.4 | 1.8 | 1.6 | | | 2.2 | 8.4 | 26.8 | 45.1 |
| 4–5 May | Tecnè | 1,000 | 29.3 | 19.6 | 15.7 | 8.9 | 8.7 | 4.6 | 2.5 | 3.1 | 2.4 | | | | | 5.2 | 9.7 | 25.1 | 46.9 |
| 4 May | EMG | 1,435 | 28.3 | 20.0 | 16.3 | 9.3 | 6.5 | 4.0 | 3.2 | 2.7 | 2.3 | 2.7 | 1.0 | | 1.0 | 2.7 | 8.3 | 25 | 45.1 |
| 4 May | Piepoli | – | 30.0 | 19.0 | 16.5 | 8.5 | 7.0 | 3.5 | 2.5 | 2.5 | 2.0 | 2.0 | | | 1.5 | 5.0 | 11.0 | 23.5 | 47 |
| 3–4 May | Quorum | 805 | 28.6 | 20.8 | 16.9 | 8.4 | 6.4 | 4.2 | 2.5 | 3.0 | 1.9 | 1.8 | | | 1.0 | 4.5 | 7.8 | 25.7 | 44.4 |
| 2–4 May | Lab2101 | 1,000 | 29.2 | 19.8 | 15.9 | 9.8 | 6.7 | 5.4 | 2.3 | 3.4 | 2.2 | 2.5 | | | 0.4 | 2.4 | 9.4 | 25.4 | 46.1 |
| 2–4 May | Termometro Politico | 4,100 | 29.6 | 18.9 | 16.1 | 9.3 | 7.4 | 4.2 | 2.3 | 2.4 | 2.5 | 2.5 | 1.5 | 1.4 | | 1.9 | 10.7 | 23.8 | 46.3 |
| 3 May | Proger Index | 800 | 29.1 | 20.8 | 15.6 | 9.0 | 6.7 | 4.4 | 2.6 | 3.1 | 2.5 | 2.0 | | | | 4.2 | 8.3 | 26.4 | 44.8 |
| 26–30 Apr | SWG | 1,200 | 28.8 | 21.5 | 15.3 | 9.0 | 6.8 | 4.3 | 2.5 | 3.2 | 2.3 | 2.1 | 1.8 | | | 2.4 | 7.3 | 27 | 44.6 |
| 27–28 Apr | Tecnè | 1,000 | 29.4 | 19.4 | 15.9 | 9.0 | 8.4 | 4.5 | 2.6 | 3.0 | 2.3 | | | | | 5.5 | 10.0 | 24.7 | 46.8 |
| 27 Apr | EMG | 1,536 | 27.8 | 19.9 | 16.3 | 9.3 | 6.8 | 4.2 | 3.4 | 2.9 | 2.1 | 2.7 | 1.1 | | 1.1 | 2.4 | 7.9 | 24.9 | 45 |
| 26–27 Apr | Quorum | 804 | 29.0 | 20.8 | 16.6 | 8.6 | 6.2 | 4.1 | 2.4 | 3.0 | 1.8 | 1.5 | | | 1.1 | 4.9 | 8.2 | 25.6 | 44.9 |
| 26–27 Apr | Demos & Pi | 1,007 | 29.3 | 20.1 | 15.6 | 8.2 | 7.6 | 4.2 | 2.4 | 3.2 | 2.7 | | | | | 6.7 | 9.2 | 26 | 45.1 |
| 25–27 Apr | Termometro Politico | 3,900 | 29.6 | 18.7 | 15.9 | 9.5 | 7.7 | 4.1 | 2.4 | 2.3 | 2.5 | 2.4 | 1.4 | 1.5 | | 2.0 | 10.9 | 23.5 | 46.8 |
| 24–27 Apr | Lab2101 | 1,000 | 29.1 | 20.1 | 15.8 | 9.7 | 6.6 | 5.5 | 2.4 | 3.3 | 2.3 | 2.4 | | | 0.6 | 2.2 | 9.0 | 25.7 | 46 |
| 26 Apr | Euromedia | 800 | 29.0 | 20.1 | 15.7 | 9.5 | 7.1 | 4.5 | 3.9 | 1.9 | 2.1 | 2.3 | | | 0.6 | 3.3 | 8.9 | 24.1 | 46.2 |
| 19–24 Apr | SWG | 1,200 | 28.6 | 21.1 | 15.4 | 9.3 | 6.6 | 4.4 | 2.4 | 3.0 | 2.4 | 2.3 | 1.8 | | 0.8 | 1.9 | 7.5 | 26.5 | 45.3 |
| 21 Apr | Piepoli | – | 30.0 | 18.0 | 16.0 | 8.5 | 8.0 | 4.0 | 2.5 | 2.5 | 2.0 | 2.0 | | | 1.5 | 5.5 | 12.0 | 22.5 | 48 |
| 20–21 Apr | Tecnè | 1,000 | 29.3 | 19.6 | 15.7 | 9.0 | 8.3 | 4.4 | 2.5 | 3.1 | 2.4 | | | | | 5.7 | 9.7 | 25.1 | 46.6 |
| 18–21 Apr | Lab2101 | 1,000 | 29.3 | 19.8 | 15.6 | 9.8 | 6.5 | 5.7 | 2.5 | 3.2 | 2.3 | 2.4 | | | 0.5 | 2.4 | 9.5 | 25.3 | 46.1 |
| 20 Apr | EMG | 1,485 | 27.3 | 19.9 | 16.6 | 9.0 | 7.2 | 4.4 | 3.6 | 3.0 | 1.9 | 2.8 | 1.3 | | 1.2 | 1.8 | 7.4 | 24.8 | 44.7 |
| 18–20 Apr | Quorum | 802 | 29.4 | 20.7 | 16.9 | 8.7 | 6.8 | 3.5 | 2.1 | 2.6 | 2.0 | 1.8 | | | 1.3 | 4.2 | 8.7 | 25.3 | 46.2 |
| 18–20 Apr | Ipsos | 1,000 | 29.0 | 20.7 | 16.5 | 8.0 | 8.0 | 5.2 | | 3.3 | 2.3 | 1.6 | 1.3 | 1.2 | 1.3 | 1.6 | 8.3 | 26.3 | 46.3 |
| 18–20 Apr | Termometro Politico | 4,100 | 29.2 | 18.7 | 16.2 | 9.7 | 7.5 | 4.3 | 2.5 | 2.2 | 2.4 | 2.4 | 1.5 | 1.5 | | 1.9 | 10.5 | 23.3 | 46.4 |
| 19 Apr | Proger Index | 800 | 29.1 | 20.5 | 15.7 | 9.3 | 6.4 | 4.3 | 2.5 | 3.0 | 2.5 | 2.0 | | | | 4.7 | 8.6 | 26 | 44.8 |
| 18–19 Apr | Noto | 1,000 | 28.0 | 21.0 | 15.0 | 10.0 | 7.0 | 5.0 | 2.5 | 3.0 | 2.0 | | | | 1.5 | 5.0 | 7.0 | 26 | 46.5 |
| 18–19 Apr | Demopolis | 2,000 | 29.2 | 20.5 | 15.0 | 9.0 | 6.8 | 4.3 | 2.0 | 3.2 | 1.8 | 1.7 | 1.5 | | | 5.0 | 8.7 | 25.5 | 45 |
| 12–17 Apr | SWG | 1,200 | 29.0 | 21.0 | 15.4 | 9.4 | 6.3 | 4.6 | 2.6 | 3.1 | 2.3 | 2.1 | 1.9 | | | 2.3 | 8.0 | 26.4 | 44.7 |
| 15 Apr | Piepoli | – | 29.5 | 18.0 | 16.0 | 8.5 | 7.5 | 7.5 | | 3.0 | 2.5 | 2.0 | | | 1.5 | 4.0 | 11.5 | 23.5 | 47 |
| 13–14 Apr | BiDiMedia | 872 | 28.5 | 20.0 | 15.5 | 9.5 | 6.6 | 5.0 | 2.5 | 2.8 | 2.4 | 1.8 | 1.3 | 1.1 | 0.8 | 2.2 | 8.5 | 25.2 | 45.4 |
| 13–14 Apr | Tecnè | 1,000 | 29.4 | 19.6 | 15.6 | 8.9 | 8.3 | 6.9 | | 3.3 | 2.3 | 1.7 | | | | 4.0 | 9.8 | 25.2 | 46.6 |
| 13 Apr | EMG | 1,413 | 27.0 | 19.5 | 17.0 | 9.3 | 7.4 | 6.9 | | 2.9 | 2.0 | 2.7 | 1.4 | | 1.2 | 2.7 | 7.5 | 24.4 | 44.9 |
| 12–13 Apr | Quorum | 802 | 28.9 | 20.3 | 16.6 | 8.1 | 6.8 | 7.5 | | 3.0 | 2.1 | 1.9 | | | 0.9 | 3.9 | 8.6 | 25.4 | 44.7 |
| 11–13 Apr | Termometro Politico | 4,200 | 29.6 | 18.4 | 16.4 | 8.9 | 7.7 | 7.5 | | 2.3 | 2.3 | 2.2 | 1.3 | 1.5 | | 1.9 | 11.2 | 23 | 46.2 |
| 7–13 Apr | Lab2101 | 1,000 | 29.1 | 19.4 | 15.8 | 9.7 | 6.8 | 7.9 | | 3.4 | 2.2 | 2.6 | | | 0.6 | 2.5 | 9.7 | 25 | 46.2 |
| 12 Apr | Euromedia | 1,000 | 29.6 | 20.1 | 15.2 | 9.3 | 7.0 | 7.7 | | 2.1 | 2.1 | 2.4 | | | 0.5 | 4.0 | 9.5 | 24.3 | 46.4 |
| 12 Apr | Proger Index | 800 | 29.5 | 20.3 | 15.6 | 8.9 | 6.5 | 7.8 | | 3.3 | 2.6 | 1.9 | | | | 3.6 | 9.2 | 26.2 | 44.9 |
| 5–10 Apr | SWG | 1,200 | 29.3 | 20.7 | 15.1 | 8.8 | 6.5 | 7.7 | | 3.2 | 2.4 | 1.9 | 1.9 | | | 2.5 | 8.6 | 26.3 | 44.6 |
| 7 Apr | Piepoli | – | 29.5 | 17.5 | 16.0 | 8.5 | 7.0 | 7.5 | | 3.0 | 2.5 | 2.0 | | | 1.5 | 5.0 | 12.0 | 23 | 46.5 |
| 5–7 Apr | Tecnè | 1,000 | 29.7 | 19.8 | 15.4 | 8.7 | 8.1 | 7.4 | | 3.1 | 2.1 | 1.6 | | | | 4.1 | 9.9 | 25 | 46.5 |
| 6 Apr | EMG | 1,402 | 26.6 | 19.3 | 16.8 | 9.6 | 8.0 | 6.8 | | 2.7 | 2.0 | 2.6 | 1.4 | | 1.2 | 3.0 | 7.3 | 24 | 45.4 |
| 4–6 Apr | Termometro Politico | 4,100 | 29.4 | 18.4 | 16.7 | 8.9 | 7.5 | 7.7 | | 2.1 | 2.3 | 2.4 | 1.5 | 1.4 | | 1.7 | 11.0 | 22.8 | 45.8 |
| 1–6 Apr | Lab2101 | 1,000 | 29.3 | 18.7 | 15.6 | 9.8 | 6.5 | 8.5 | | 3.7 | 2.1 | 2.4 | | | 0.6 | 2.8 | 10.6 | 24.5 | 46.2 |
| 5 Apr | Proger Index | 800 | 29.8 | 20.2 | 15.4 | 8.7 | 6.2 | 8.1 | | 3.2 | 2.6 | 1.8 | | | | 4.0 | 9.6 | 26 | 44.7 |
| 2–3 Apr | Regional elections in Friuli-Venezia Giulia (CDX hold) | | | | | | | | | | | | | | | | | | |
| 29 Mar – 3 Apr | SWG | 1,200 | 29.7 | 20.4 | 15.1 | 8.4 | 6.2 | 7.8 | | 3.3 | 2.6 | 1.8 | 1.9 | | | 2.8 | 9.3 | 26.3 | 44.3 |
| 30–31 Mar | Tecnè | 1,000 | 29.7 | 20.0 | 15.5 | 8.6 | 7.4 | 7.3 | | 3.2 | 2.3 | 1.7 | | | | 4.3 | 9.7 | 25.5 | 45.7 |
| 30 Mar | EMG | 1,333 | 26.8 | 19.3 | 16.5 | 9.5 | 8.2 | 6.9 | | 2.7 | 2.0 | 2.6 | 1.4 | | 1.2 | 2.9 | 7.5 | 24 | 45.7 |
| 29–30 Mar | Quorum | 805 | 28.8 | 20.6 | 16.4 | 9.0 | 6.2 | 7.3 | | 2.7 | 2.0 | 2.2 | | | 1.2 | 3.6 | 8.2 | 25.3 | 45.2 |
| 28–30 Mar | Termometro Politico | 4,200 | 29.6 | 18.5 | 16.5 | 9.0 | 7.4 | 7.6 | | 2.0 | 2.2 | 2.6 | 1.3 | 1.5 | | 1.8 | 11.1 | 22.7 | 46 |
| 27–30 Mar | Ixè | 1,000 | 28.9 | 21.1 | 15.5 | 8.1 | 6.8 | 6.7 | | 3.9 | 1.9 | 1.6 | | | 1.0 | 4.5 | 7.8 | 26.9 | 44.8 |
| 24–30 Mar | Lab2101 | 1,000 | 29.7 | 18.7 | 15.2 | 9.6 | 6.9 | 9.1 | | 3.7 | 2.1 | 2.3 | | | 0.6 | 2.1 | 11.0 | 24.5 | 46.8 |
| 29 Mar | Euromedia | 1,000 | 28.7 | 20.5 | 15.0 | 9.0 | 7.0 | 8.6 | | 2.8 | 2.1 | 2.4 | | | 0.5 | 3.4 | 8.2 | 25.4 | 45.2 |
| 29 Mar | Proger Index | 800 | 29.7 | 20.1 | 15.6 | 8.6 | 6.4 | 8.3 | | 3.1 | 2.5 | 1.7 | | | | 4.0 | 9.6 | 25.7 | 44.7 |
| 26–27 Mar | Tecné | 1,000 | 30.0 | 20.0 | 15.5 | 9.0 | 7.5 | 7.0 | | | | | | | | 11.0 | 10.0 | 20 | 46.5 |
| 22–27 Mar | SWG | 1,200 | 29.6 | 20.4 | 15.6 | 8.0 | 6.4 | 8.0 | | 3.4 | 2.7 | 1.8 | 1.7 | | | 2.4 | 9.2 | 26.5 | 44 |
| 24 Mar | Piepoli | – | 30.0 | 17.5 | 16.5 | 9.0 | 7.0 | 8.0 | | 3.0 | 2.0 | 2.0 | | | 1.5 | 3.5 | 12.5 | 22.5 | 47.5 |
| 23–24 Mar | Tecnè | 1,000 | 30.0 | 19.8 | 15.6 | 8.8 | 7.2 | 7.1 | | 3.1 | 2.4 | 1.8 | | | | 4.2 | 10.2 | 25.3 | 46 |
| 23 Mar | EMG | 1,472 | 27.0 | 18.9 | 16.6 | 9.3 | 8.5 | 7.1 | | 2.7 | 2.2 | 2.6 | 1.4 | | 1.3 | 2.4 | 8.1 | 23.8 | 46.1 |
| 23 Mar | Noto | – | 29.0 | 21.0 | 14.5 | 8.5 | 7.5 | 8.0 | | 3.0 | 1.5 | | | | 1.5 | 5.5 | 8.0 | 25.5 | 46.5 |
| 22–23 Mar | Termometro Politico | 4,200 | 29.4 | 18.0 | 16.3 | 9.0 | 7.7 | 7.8 | | 2.2 | 2.4 | 2.4 | 1.4 | 1.5 | | 1.9 | 11.4 | 22.6 | 46.1 |
| 21–23 Mar | Quorum | 805 | 28.9 | 20.1 | 15.8 | 8.8 | 5.9 | 7.6 | | 2.8 | 2.3 | 2.4 | | | 1.3 | 4.1 | 8.8 | 25.2 | 44.9 |
| 18–23 Mar | Lab2101 | 1,000 | 30.1 | 18.4 | 15.4 | 9.5 | 6.7 | 9.0 | | 3.6 | 2.2 | 2.1 | | | 0.7 | 2.2 | 11.7 | 24.2 | 47 |
| 21–22 Mar | Demopolis | 2,000 | 30.0 | 20.2 | 15.0 | 8.5 | 6.6 | 7.3 | | 3.0 | | | | | | 9.4 | 9.8 | 23.2 | 45.1 |
| 16–20 Mar | Ixè | 1,000 | 28.6 | 20.1 | 16.2 | 8.0 | 6.2 | 7.0 | | 4.6 | 2.0 | 2.0 | | | 0.9 | 4.4 | 8.5 | 26.7 | 43.7 |
| 15–20 Mar | SWG | 1,200 | 30.3 | 20.4 | 15.3 | 8.5 | 6.3 | 7.7 | | 3.2 | 2.5 | 1.7 | 1.8 | | | 2.3 | 9.9 | 26.1 | 45.1 |
| 16–17 Mar | Tecnè | 1,000 | 30.1 | 19.6 | 15.8 | 8.8 | 7.2 | 7.2 | | 3.0 | 2.5 | 1.7 | | | | 4.1 | 10.5 | 25.1 | 46.1 |
| 11–17 Mar | Lab2101 | 1,000 | 30.3 | 18.0 | 15.6 | 9.4 | 6.9 | 8.9 | | 3.7 | 2.1 | 1.8 | | | 0.6 | 2.7 | 12.3 | 23.8 | 47.2 |
| 16 Mar | EMG | 1,365 | 27.1 | 18.4 | 16.5 | 9.5 | 8.5 | 7.0 | | 2.9 | 2.4 | 2.7 | 1.4 | | 1.4 | 2.2 | 8.7 | 23.7 | 46.5 |
| 14–16 Mar | Quorum | 805 | 29.0 | 19.3 | 15.8 | 8.5 | 5.8 | 7.6 | | 2.9 | 2.0 | 2.4 | | | 1.5 | 5.2 | 9.7 | 24.2 | 44.8 |
| 14–16 Mar | Ipsos | 1,000 | 30.3 | 19.0 | 16.8 | 8.0 | 7.2 | 6.2 | | 3.5 | 2.0 | 2.2 | 1.9 | 1.0 | 1.0 | 0.9 | 11.3 | 24.5 | 46.5 |
| 14–16 Mar | Termometro Politico | 4,200 | 29.5 | 18.0 | 16.4 | 9.2 | 7.5 | 7.7 | | 2.0 | 2.3 | 2.2 | 1.5 | 1.6 | | 2.1 | 11.5 | 22.3 | 46.2 |
| 15 Mar | Proger Index | 800 | 29.8 | 19.5 | 15.8 | 9.0 | 6.2 | 8.1 | | 3.1 | 2.7 | 1.9 | | | | 3.9 | 10.3 | 25.3 | 45 |
| 14 Mar | Piepoli | – | 30.5 | 16.5 | 16.5 | 9.5 | 7.5 | 7.5 | | 2.5 | 2.0 | 2.5 | | | 1.5 | 3.5 | 14.0 | 21 | 49 |
| 13 Mar | Euromedia | 800 | 29.2 | 20.3 | 15.0 | 9.4 | 6.5 | 8.4 | | 2.6 | 2.2 | 2.4 | | | 0.5 | 3.5 | 8.9 | 25.1 | 45.6 |
| 8–13 Mar | SWG | 1,200 | 30.3 | 19.8 | 16.1 | 8.8 | 6.4 | 7.5 | | 3.2 | 2.2 | 1.6 | 1.7 | | | 2.4 | 10.5 | 25.2 | 45.5 |
| 10–11 Mar | BiDiMedia | 1,034 | 28.1 | 18.7 | 16.0 | 9.2 | 7.1 | 8.4 | | 2.9 | 2.6 | 1.8 | 1.3 | 1.0 | 0.9 | 2.0 | 9.4 | 24.2 | 45.3 |
| 9–10 Mar | Tecnè | 1,000 | 30.6 | 18.6 | 16.0 | 8.9 | 7.4 | 7.4 | | 2.8 | 2.4 | 1.8 | | | | 4.1 | 12.0 | 23.8 | 46.9 |
| 7–10 Mar | Lab2101 | 1,000 | 30.1 | 17.5 | 15.9 | 9.2 | 7.1 | 8.7 | | 3.9 | 2.3 | 1.7 | | | 0.7 | 2.9 | 12.6 | 23.7 | 47.1 |
| 9 Mar | EMG | 1,324 | 27.4 | 17.8 | 16.5 | 9.9 | 8.4 | 7.0 | | 3.2 | 2.6 | 2.5 | 1.3 | | 1.5 | 1.9 | 9.6 | 23.6 | 47.2 |
| 7–9 Mar | Quorum | 805 | 28.4 | 18.7 | 16.0 | 8.7 | 5.9 | 7.7 | | 3.3 | 1.8 | 2.5 | | | 1.5 | 5.5 | 9.7 | 23.8 | 44.5 |
| 7–9 Mar | Termometro Politico | 4,200 | 29.2 | 18.0 | 16.8 | 9.3 | 7.2 | 7.6 | | 2.2 | 2.3 | 2.4 | 1.3 | 1.6 | | 2.1 | 11.2 | 22.5 | 45.7 |
| 8 Mar | Proger Index | 800 | 30.0 | 18.9 | 16.0 | 9.0 | 6.1 | 8.0 | | 3.5 | 2.8 | 1.9 | | | | 3.8 | 11.1 | 25.2 | 45.1 |
| 1–6 Mar | SWG | 1,200 | 30.7 | 19.0 | 15.7 | 8.8 | 6.6 | 8.0 | | 3.0 | 2.1 | 1.7 | 1.8 | | | 2.6 | 11.7 | 24.1 | 46.1 |
| 2 Mar | EMG | 1,302 | 27.3 | 18.1 | 16.2 | 9.8 | 8.2 | 6.8 | | 3.4 | 2.8 | 2.3 | 1.4 | | 1.5 | 2.2 | 9.2 | 24.3 | 46.8 |
| 2 Mar | Tecnè | 1,000 | 30.7 | 18.0 | 16.5 | 8.8 | 7.5 | 7.4 | | 2.9 | 2.6 | 1.7 | | | | 3.9 | 12.7 | 23.5 | 47 |
| 2 Mar | Proger Index | 800 | 30.1 | 17.8 | 16.7 | 8.9 | 6.0 | 7.6 | | 4.0 | 2.9 | 2.0 | | | | 4.0 | 12.3 | 24.7 | 45 |
| 28 Feb – 2 Mar | Quorum | 804 | 28.7 | 17.9 | 15.6 | 8.7 | 5.7 | 7.2 | | 3.3 | 2.1 | 2.4 | | | 1.8 | 6.6 | 10.8 | 23.3 | 44.9 |
| 23 Feb – 2 Mar | Lab2101 | 1,000 | 29.7 | 17.3 | 16.1 | 9.6 | 7.2 | 8.4 | | 4.1 | 2.5 | 1.5 | | | 0.4 | 3.2 | 12.4 | 23.9 | 46.9 |
| 28 Feb – 1 Mar | Termometro Politico | 4,600 | 28.9 | 17.9 | 16.7 | 9.2 | 7.1 | 7.9 | | 2.0 | 2.4 | 2.6 | 1.5 | 1.6 | | 2.2 | 11.0 | 22.3 | 45.2 |
| 28 Feb | Euromedia | 1,000 | 29.6 | 19.6 | 15.6 | 9.4 | 6.9 | 8.3 | | 2.0 | 2.4 | 2.5 | | | 0.5 | 3.2 | 10.0 | 24 | 46.4 |
| 28 Feb | Noto | – | 28.5 | 19.5 | 16.5 | 10.0 | 7.5 | 8.0 | | 1.5 | 1.5 | | | | 1.5 | 6.0 | 9.0 | 22.5 | 47.5 |
| 23–27 Feb | SWG | 1,200 | 30.7 | 16.4 | 17.0 | 8.7 | 6.4 | 7.2 | | 3.8 | 2.9 | 2.0 | 1.7 | | | 3.2 | 13.7 | 23.1 | 45.8 |
| 26 Feb | Elly Schlein is elected secretary of Democratic Party in leadership election | | | | | | | | | | | | | | | | | | |
| 23–24 Feb | Tecnè | 1,000 | 31.0 | 17.2 | 16.8 | 9.1 | 7.7 | 7.2 | | 3.2 | 2.5 | 1.6 | | | | 3.7 | 13.8 | 22.9 | 47.8 |
| 21–23 Feb | Ipsos | 1,000 | 31.0 | 17.0 | 17.5 | 8.6 | 7.4 | 6.0 | | 3.5 | 2.0 | 2.1 | 2.0 | 0.8 | 1.2 | 0.9 | 13.5 | 22.5 | 48.2 |
| 23 Feb | EMG | 1,388 | 27.7 | 18.6 | 16.6 | 9.4 | 7.8 | 7.0 | | 3.2 | 3.0 | 2.0 | 1.3 | | 1.4 | 2.0 | 9.1 | 24.8 | 46.3 |
| 21–23 Feb | Termometro Politico | 4,300 | 28.5 | 16.6 | 17.3 | 9.2 | 7.5 | 7.6 | | 2.7 | 2.7 | 2.5 | 1.6 | 1.7 | | 2.1 | 11.2 | 22 | 45.2 |
| 20–23 Feb | Lab2101 | 1,000 | 29.5 | 16.2 | 16.9 | 9.5 | 6.9 | 8.0 | | 4.3 | 2.7 | 1.6 | | | 0.6 | 3.8 | 12.6 | 23.2 | 46.5 |
| 22 Feb | Proger Index | 800 | 30.5 | 16.3 | 17.1 | 9.2 | 6.0 | 7.4 | | 4.0 | 2.8 | 2.1 | | | | 4.6 | 13.4 | 23.1 | 45.7 |
| 20–22 Feb | Demos & Pi | 1,003 | 30.5 | 17.5 | 17.0 | 8.5 | 7.0 | 7.2 | | 3.3 | 2.9 | | | | | 6.1 | 13.0 | 23.7 | 46 |
| 21 Feb | Euromedia | 800 | 29.6 | 17.5 | 16.9 | 9.0 | 7.7 | 8.1 | | 3.0 | 2.4 | 2.1 | | | 0.5 | 3.2 | 12.1 | 22.9 | 46.8 |
| 15–21 Feb | Ixè | 1,000 | 31.1 | 16.9 | 17.2 | 7.6 | 6.7 | 6.6 | | 4.2 | 2.1 | 1.8 | | | 0.9 | 4.9 | 13.9 | 23.2 | 46.3 |
| 20 Feb | Piepoli | 510 | 30.5 | 15.0 | 17.0 | 9.5 | 7.0 | 7.5 | | 3.0 | 2.5 | 2.5 | | | 1.5 | 4.0 | 13.5 | 20.5 | 48.5 |
| 15–20 Feb | SWG | 1,200 | 31.0 | 15.8 | 17.0 | 9.3 | 6.2 | 7.4 | | 3.4 | 2.8 | 1.9 | 2.0 | | | 3.2 | 14.0 | 22 | 46.5 |
| 16–18 Feb | Tecnè | 1,000 | 31.1 | 16.7 | 17.0 | 9.2 | 7.8 | 7.4 | | 3.1 | 2.4 | 1.7 | | | | 3.6 | 14.1 | 22.2 | 48.1 |
| 14–16 Feb | Termometro Politico | 4,100 | 28.7 | 16.8 | 17.2 | 8.9 | 7.5 | 7.9 | | 2.8 | 2.5 | 2.4 | 1.5 | 1.6 | | 2.2 | 11.5 | 22.1 | 45.1 |
| 13–16 Feb | Lab2101 | 1,000 | 29.4 | 16.0 | 17.2 | 9.6 | 6.9 | 8.1 | | 4.0 | 2.6 | 1.5 | | | 0.5 | 4.2 | 12.2 | 22.6 | 46.4 |
| 15 Feb | Proger Index | 800 | 31.0 | 15.4 | 17.5 | 8.7 | 6.3 | 7.6 | | 3.9 | 2.8 | 2.2 | | | | 4.6 | 13.5 | 22.1 | 46 |
| 13–14 Feb | EMG | 1,523 | 27.8 | 18.3 | 17.5 | 8.8 | 7.4 | 7.4 | | 3.5 | 2.5 | 2.0 | 1.3 | | 1.5 | 2.0 | 9.5 | 24.3 | 45.5 |
| 13 Feb | Noto | – | 28.5 | 16.0 | 19.0 | 10.0 | 7.5 | 7.5 | | 2.5 | 2.0 | | | | 1.5 | 5.5 | 9.5 | 20.5 | 47.5 |
| 12–13 Feb | Regional elections in Lombardy (CDX hold); regional elections in Lazio (CDX gain from CSX) | | | | | | | | | | | | | | | | | | |
| 11–13 Feb | Tecnè | 1,000 | 30.6 | 17.1 | 16.7 | 9.2 | 8.0 | 7.4 | | 3.3 | 2.5 | | | | | 5.2 | 13.5 | 22.9 | 47.8 |
| 8–13 Feb | SWG | 1,200 | 31.0 | 15.1 | 17.7 | 8.9 | 6.1 | 7.8 | | 3.6 | 2.8 | 2.2 | 1.7 | | | 3.1 | 13.3 | 21.5 | 46 |
| 9 Feb | Lab2101 | 1,000 | 28.9 | 15.5 | 17.9 | 9.3 | 6.8 | 9.1 | | 4.0 | 2.7 | 1.4 | | | 0.5 | 2.7 | 11.0 | 22.2 | 45.5 |
| 1–6 Feb | SWG | 1,200 | 30.6 | 14.8 | 17.5 | 8.7 | 6.4 | 8.1 | | 3.5 | 3.0 | 2.3 | 2.0 | | | 3.1 | 13.1 | 21.3 | 45.7 |
| 27 Jan – 3 Feb | Lab2101 | 1,000 | 28.5 | 16.6 | 17.8 | 9.5 | 7.0 | 9.3 | | 3.9 | 2.8 | 1.4 | | | 0.6 | 2.6 | 10.7 | 23.3 | 45.6 |
| 2 Feb | EMG | 1,456 | 27.5 | 17.9 | 17.7 | 8.7 | 7.4 | 7.6 | | 3.4 | 2.5 | 2.0 | 1.5 | | 1.3 | 2.5 | 9.6 | 23.8 | 44.9 |
| 31 Jan – 2 Feb | Termometro Politico | 4,100 | 28.5 | 16.5 | 17.9 | 8.6 | 7.0 | 8.3 | | 2.9 | 2.6 | 2.3 | 1.6 | 1.6 | | 2.2 | 10.6 | 22 | 44.1 |
| 30 Jan – 2 Feb | Ixè | 1,000 | 30.1 | 16.7 | 17.9 | 7.8 | 7.5 | 7.0 | | 3.8 | 2.8 | 2.7 | | | 0.5 | 3.2 | 12.2 | 23.3 | 45.9 |
| 1 Feb | Proger Index | 800 | 30.7 | 15.2 | 17.7 | 8.5 | 6.6 | 7.9 | | 4.0 | 2.9 | 2.2 | | | | 4.3 | 13.0 | 22.1 | 45.8 |
| 30 Jan | EMG | 1,325 | 27.5 | 17.7 | 17.9 | 8.6 | 7.2 | 7.9 | | 3.6 | 2.4 | 2.2 | 1.3 | | 1.3 | 2.4 | 9.6 | 23.7 | 44.6 |
| 25–30 Jan | SWG | 1,200 | 30.4 | 14.2 | 17.8 | 9.0 | 6.8 | 8.2 | | 3.6 | 3.2 | 2.0 | 2.0 | | | 2.8 | 12.6 | 21 | 46.2 |
| 26 Jan | Piepoli | – | 30.0 | 15.0 | 17.5 | 9.0 | 6.5 | 8.5 | | 4.0 | 3.0 | 2.0 | | | 1.5 | 3.0 | 12.5 | 22 | 47 |
| 25–26 Jan | Termometro Politico | 3,300 | 28.6 | 16.6 | 17.6 | 8.4 | 7.4 | 8.1 | | 2.8 | 2.5 | 2.5 | 1.5 | 1.5 | | 2.5 | 11.0 | 21.9 | 44.4 |
| 23–26 Jan | Quorum | 1,602 | 29.6 | 15.8 | 17.7 | 8.7 | 6.7 | 7.8 | | 3.5 | 2.3 | 1.9 | 1.3 | | 1.5 | 3.2 | 11.9 | 21.6 | 46.5 |
| 19–26 Jan | Lab2101 | 1,000 | 28.8 | 16.9 | 17.8 | 9.4 | 6.9 | 9.4 | | 3.8 | 2.8 | 1.5 | | | 0.5 | 2.2 | 11.0 | 23.5 | 45.6 |
| 25 Jan | Proger Index | 800 | 30.5 | 15.1 | 17.5 | 8.2 | 6.7 | 7.9 | | 4.0 | 3.0 | 2.2 | | | | 4.9 | 13.0 | 22.1 | 45.4 |
| 25 Jan | Noto | – | 28.0 | 15.0 | 20.0 | 10.0 | 7.0 | 8.5 | | 3.0 | 2.0 | | | | 1.0 | 5.5 | 8.0 | 20 | 46 |
| 24–25 Jan | Demopolis | 2,000 | 29.0 | 15.0 | 17.8 | 8.3 | 6.6 | 7.5 | | 3.2 | | | | | | 12.6 | 11.2 | 18.2 | 43.9 |
| 24 Jan | Euromedia | 800 | 29.1 | 17.2 | 17.0 | 8.5 | 7.6 | 8.6 | | 2.6 | 2.4 | 2.5 | | | 0.5 | 4.0 | 11.9 | 22.2 | 45.7 |
| 19 Jan | EMG | 1,406 | 27.8 | 17.4 | 17.6 | 8.8 | 7.0 | 8.2 | | 3.8 | 2.3 | 2.3 | 1.3 | | 1.4 | 2.1 | 10.2 | 23.5 | 45 |
| 19–23 Jan | Ipsos | 1,000 | 30.5 | 16.4 | 18.2 | 8.3 | 6.8 | 7.1 | | 4.1 | 2.0 | 2.2 | 1.3 | 1.3 | 1.0 | 0.8 | 12.3 | 22.5 | 46.6 |
| 18–23 Jan | SWG | 1,200 | 30.8 | 14.0 | 17.4 | 8.5 | 6.6 | 8.2 | | 3.8 | 3.1 | 2.3 | 1.8 | | 1.0 | 2.5 | 13.4 | 20.9 | 46.9 |
| 19–20 Jan | Tecnè | 1,000 | 31.0 | 15.5 | 17.4 | 9.0 | 7.7 | 7.8 | | 3.2 | 2.6 | 1.9 | | | | 3.9 | 13.6 | 21.3 | 47.7 |
| 17–19 Jan | Termometro Politico | 3,800 | 29.1 | 16.4 | 17.3 | 8.4 | 7.2 | 8.1 | | 3.0 | 2.6 | 2.3 | 1.6 | 1.5 | | 2.5 | 11.8 | 22 | 44.7 |
| 16–18 Jan | BiDiMedia | 1,200 | 29.1 | 16.3 | 17.1 | 8.8 | 6.8 | 8.2 | | 3.6 | 2.7 | 2.3 | 1.4 | 0.9 | 0.9 | 1.9 | 12.0 | 22.6 | 45.6 |
| 13–18 Jan | Lab2101 | 1,000 | 28.5 | 16.5 | 18.1 | 9.5 | 6.7 | 9.1 | | 3.9 | 2.7 | 1.7 | | | 0.4 | 2.9 | 10.4 | 23.1 | 45.1 |
| 11–16 Jan | SWG | 1,200 | 31.3 | 14.2 | 17.6 | 8.3 | 6.4 | 7.8 | | 3.7 | 3.0 | 2.3 | 1.8 | | 1.0 | 2.6 | 13.7 | 20.9 | 47 |
| 12–13 Jan | Tecnè | 1,000 | 31.0 | 15.2 | 17.6 | 9.0 | 7.6 | 7.6 | | 3.5 | 2.5 | 1.8 | | | | 4.2 | 13.4 | 21.2 | 47.6 |
| 12 Jan | EMG | 1,528 | 28.2 | 17.1 | 17.4 | 9.0 | 7.0 | 8.4 | | 3.5 | 2.1 | 2.5 | 1.4 | | 1.4 | 2.0 | 10.8 | 22.7 | 45.6 |
| 10–12 Jan | Termometro Politico | 3,700 | 28.8 | 16.3 | 17.5 | 8.6 | 7.1 | 8.0 | | 3.2 | 2.5 | 2.4 | 1.5 | 1.4 | | 2.7 | 11.3 | 22 | 44.5 |
| 06–12 Jan | Lab2101 | 1,000 | 28.2 | 16.2 | 18.2 | 9.4 | 6.5 | 8.9 | | 4.0 | 2.8 | 1.8 | | | 0.6 | 3.4 | 10.0 | 23 | 44.7 |
| 10–11 Jan | Euromedia | 1,000 | 28.2 | 16.7 | 17.5 | 9.0 | 7.0 | 8.3 | | 1.9 | 2.5 | 2.6 | | | 1.0 | 5.3 | 10.7 | 21.1 | 45.2 |
| 10 Jan | Piepoli | – | 30.5 | 15.0 | 17.5 | 9.0 | 6.5 | 7.5 | | 3.5 | 3.0 | 2.5 | | | 1.5 | 3.5 | 13.0 | 21.5 | 47.5 |
| 4–9 Jan | SWG | 1,200 | 31.3 | 14.0 | 17.7 | 8.5 | 6.9 | 7.5 | | 3.7 | 3.0 | 2.2 | 1.6 | | 1.1 | 2.5 | 13.6 | 20.7 | 47.8 |
| 2–5 Jan | Lab2101 | 1,000 | 29.1 | 16.4 | 18.0 | 9.5 | 6.4 | 8.7 | | 3.9 | 2.7 | 1.7 | | | 0.4 | 3.2 | 11.1 | 23 | 45.4 |
| 4 Jan | EMG | 1,489 | 28.6 | 16.7 | 17.5 | 9.2 | 7.0 | 8.2 | | 3.5 | 2.0 | 2.4 | 1.5 | | 1.4 | 2.0 | 11.1 | 22.2 | 46.2 |

=== 2022 ===
| Polling | | | Parties | | | | | | | | | | | | | | Coalitions | |
| Fieldwork date | Polling firm | Sample size | FdI | PD | M5S | Lega | FI | A–IV | AVS | +E | Italexit | UP | ISP | NM | Others | Lead | CSX | CDX |
|---|---|---|---|---|---|---|---|---|---|---|---|---|---|---|---|---|---|---|
| 31 Dec | Demopolis | —N/a | 30.0 | 15.5 | 17.8 | 8.3 | 6.7 | 8.0 | 3.2 | | | | | | | 12.2 | 18.7 | 45 |
| 27–31 Dec | Lab2101 | 1,000 | 29.0 | 16.6 | 18.1 | 9.3 | 6.6 | 8.6 | 4.0 | 2.6 | 1.6 | | | 0.5 | 2.9 | 10.9 | 23.2 | 45.4 |
| 29 Dec | EMG | 1,434 | 28.8 | 16.5 | 17.3 | 9.3 | 7.1 | 7.9 | 3.3 | 2.2 | 2.2 | 1.8 | | 1.5 | 2.1 | 11.5 | 22 | 46.7 |
| 27–29 Dec | Termometro Politico | 3,600 | 28.7 | 16.3 | 17.7 | 8.4 | 6.8 | 8.3 | 3.3 | 2.4 | 2.4 | 1.7 | 1.5 | | 2.5 | 11.0 | 22 | 43.9 |
| 20–22 Dec | Ipsos | 1,000 | 31.7 | 16.3 | 17.6 | 7.8 | 6.2 | 7.0 | 3.8 | 2.0 | 2.3 | 1.6 | 1.5 | 1.1 | 1.1 | 14.1 | 22.1 | 46.8 |
| 20–22 Dec | Termometro Politico | 3,100 | 28.7 | 16.4 | 17.6 | 8.5 | 6.9 | 8.2 | 3.2 | 2.5 | 2.3 | 1.6 | 1.4 | | 2.7 | 11.1 | 22.1 | 44.1 |
| 19–21 Dec | Noto | – | 28.5 | 16.0 | 18.5 | 9.5 | 8.5 | 8.0 | 2.5 | 2.0 | | | | 1.5 | 5.0 | 10.0 | 20.5 | 48 |
| 19–21 Dec | Ixè | 1,000 | 30.3 | 15.5 | 18.1 | 9.1 | 6.9 | 7.7 | 4.3 | 2.6 | 2.3 | | | 1.0 | 2.2 | 12.2 | 22.4 | 47.3 |
| 20 Dec | Piepoli | | 29.5 | 16.5 | 17.5 | 8.5 | 6.0 | 8.0 | 4.0 | 2.5 | 2.5 | | | 1.5 | 3.5 | 12.0 | 23 | 45.5 |
| 19 Dec | EMG | 1,358 | 29.3 | 16.8 | 17.3 | 8.9 | 6.7 | 7.5 | 3.2 | 2.4 | 2.3 | 1.8 | | 1.4 | 2.5 | 12.0 | 22.4 | 46.3 |
| 17–19 Dec | BiDiMedia | 1,112 | 29.3 | 16.1 | 17.0 | 8.6 | 6.9 | 8.3 | 3.7 | 2.7 | 2.2 | 1.5 | 1.0 | 0.8 | 1.9 | 12.3 | 22.5 | 45.6 |
| 14–19 Dec | SWG | 1,200 | 30.6 | 14.7 | 17.4 | 9.0 | 6.1 | 7.8 | 4.0 | 2.8 | 2.2 | 1.8 | | | 3.6 | 13.2 | 21.5 | 45.7 |
| 15–16 Dec | Tecnè | 1,000 | 30.8 | 15.7 | 17.5 | 8.8 | 7.4 | 7.5 | 3.4 | 2.6 | 1.9 | | | | 4.4 | 13.3 | 21.7 | 47 |
| 15 Dec | Euromedia | – | 28.6 | 15.8 | 17.2 | 9.7 | 7.8 | 8.5 | 2.6 | 2.4 | 2.5 | | | 0.6 | 4.0 | 11.4 | 20.8 | 46.7 |
| 15 Dec | EMG | 1,412 | 29.2 | 16.8 | 17.3 | 8.9 | 6.7 | 7.5 | 3.2 | 2.4 | 2.3 | 1.8 | | 1.4 | 2.5 | 11.9 | 22.4 | 46.2 |
| 14–15 Dec | Quorum | 800 | 33.0 | 15.4 | 16.7 | 9.1 | 6.0 | 8.5 | 3.1 | 1.9 | 2.4 | 1.8 | | 1.1 | 1.0 | 16.3 | 20.4 | 49.2 |
| 14–15 Dec | Termometro Politico | 3,700 | 28.7 | 16.8 | 17.6 | 8.1 | 7.0 | 8.3 | 3.3 | 2.4 | 2.4 | 1.6 | 1.3 | | 2.5 | 11.1 | 22.5 | 43.8 |
| 8–12 Dec | BiDiMedia | 2,018 | 29.1 | 16.5 | 17.2 | 8.2 | 7.0 | 8.1 | 3.8 | 2.5 | 2.1 | 1.7 | 1.1 | 0.7 | 2.0 | 11.9 | 22.8 | 45 |
| 7–12 Dec | SWG | 1,200 | 30.8 | 15.1 | 17.1 | 8.5 | 6.0 | 8.0 | 4.1 | 2.7 | 2.1 | 1.6 | | | 4.0 | 13.7 | 21.9 | 45.3 |
| 9 Dec | Tecnè | 1,000 | 30.5 | 16.4 | 17.5 | 8.7 | 7.3 | 7.6 | 3.5 | 2.5 | 1.8 | | | | 4.4 | 13.0 | 22.4 | 46.5 |
| 8 Dec | EMG | 1,428 | 29.2 | 17.0 | 17.5 | 8.7 | 6.6 | 7.3 | 3.2 | 2.6 | 2.5 | 1.9 | | 1.4 | 2.1 | 11.7 | 22.8 | 45.9 |
| 7–8 Dec | Termometro Politico | 3,400 | 28.5 | 16.8 | 17.3 | 8.3 | 6.9 | 8.3 | 3.5 | 2.5 | 2.2 | 1.7 | 1.5 | | 2.5 | 11.2 | 22.8 | 43.7 |
| 30 Nov – 5 Dec | SWG | 1,200 | 30.8 | 15.4 | 16.6 | 8.1 | 6.1 | 8.2 | 4.0 | 3.0 | 2.2 | 1.7 | | | 3.9 | 14.2 | 22.4 | 45 |
| 2 Dec | Tecnè | 1,000 | 30.4 | 16.6 | 17.4 | 8.5 | 7.3 | 7.5 | 3.3 | 2.5 | 1.9 | | | | 4.6 | 13.0 | 22.4 | 46.2 |
| 1 Dec | EMG | 1,425 | 29.0 | 16.9 | 17.7 | 9.1 | 6.5 | 7.5 | 3.4 | 2.6 | 2.4 | 2.1 | | 1.3 | 1.5 | 11.3 | 22.9 | 45.9 |
| 1 Dec | Noto | – | 28.0 | 17.0 | 18.0 | 10.0 | 8.0 | 8.0 | 3.5 | 2.0 | | | | 1.5 | 4.0 | 10.0 | 22.5 | 47.5 |
| 29 Nov – 1 Dec | Termometro Politico | 3,900 | 28.6 | 16.8 | 17.5 | 8.2 | 6.7 | 8.4 | 3.4 | 2.5 | 2.3 | 1.6 | 1.4 | | 2.6 | 11.1 | 22.7 | 43.5 |
| 30 Nov | Euromedia | 1,000 | 28.1 | 17.4 | 16.6 | 9.8 | 7.3 | 8.4 | 3.2 | 2.3 | 2.3 | | | 0.6 | 4.0 | 10.7 | 22.9 | 45.8 |
| 23–28 Nov | SWG | 1,200 | 30.3 | 15.8 | 16.9 | 7.8 | 6.5 | 8.1 | 4.3 | 2.8 | 2.2 | 1.6 | | | 3.7 | 13.4 | 22.9 | 44.6 |
| 25 Nov | Tecnè | 1,000 | 30.3 | 16.4 | 17.6 | 8.4 | 7.2 | 7.6 | 3.3 | 2.6 | 1.8 | | | | 4.8 | 12.7 | 22.3 | 45.9 |
| 23–25 Nov | BiDiMedia | 1,000 | 28.4 | 16.7 | 17.2 | 8.5 | 7.5 | 7.9 | 3.7 | 2.6 | 2.2 | 1.6 | 1.1 | 0.6 | 2.0 | 11.2 | 23 | 45 |
| 24 Nov | EMG | 1,585 | 28.9 | 16.6 | 18.0 | 9.0 | 6.7 | 7.7 | 3.3 | 2.4 | 2.6 | 2.0 | | 1.2 | 1.6 | 10.9 | 22.3 | 45.8 |
| 22–24 Nov | Ipsos | 1,000 | 31.4 | 17.2 | 17.5 | 7.3 | 6.8 | 6.8 | 4.2 | 2.1 | 1.7 | 2.0 | 1.2 | 1.2 | 0.6 | 13.9 | 23.5 | 46.7 |
| 22–24 Nov | Termometro Politico | 3,800 | 28.7 | 17.0 | 17.1 | 8.0 | 6.9 | 8.4 | 3.3 | 2.6 | 2.2 | 1.6 | 1.4 | | 2.8 | 11.6 | 22.9 | 43.6 |
| 23 Nov | Euromedia | 1,000 | 28.3 | 17.2 | 16.8 | 9.5 | 6.7 | 8.2 | 3.0 | 2.5 | 2.6 | | | 0.8 | 4.4 | 11.1 | 22.7 | 45.3 |
| 21–22 Nov | Piepoli | 509 | 29.0 | 17.5 | 17.0 | 8.5 | 7.0 | 8.5 | 4.0 | 3.0 | 2.0 | | | 1.5 | 2.0 | 11.5 | 24.5 | 46 |
| 21–22 Nov | Demopolis | 2,000 | 29.0 | 16.5 | 17.4 | 8.7 | 7.3 | 7.6 | 3.5 | | | | | | 10.0 | 11.6 | 20 | 45 |
| 21 Nov | EMG | 1,489 | 28.9 | 16.5 | 18.0 | 8.8 | 6.9 | 7.5 | 3.4 | 2.3 | 2.5 | 1.9 | | 1.2 | 2.1 | 10.9 | 22.2 | 45.8 |
| 16–21 Nov | SWG | 1,200 | 30.4 | 16.2 | 16.9 | 7.6 | 6.4 | 7.9 | 4.0 | 3.0 | 1.9 | 1.5 | | | 4.2 | 13.5 | 23.2 | 44.4 |
| 18 Nov | Tecnè | 1,000 | 30.1 | 16.4 | 17.4 | 8.5 | 7.2 | 7.7 | 3.4 | 2.5 | 1.9 | | | | 4.9 | 12.7 | 22.3 | 45.8 |
| 15–17 Nov | Termometro Politico | 3,900 | 28.8 | 17.0 | 16.6 | 8.2 | 6.6 | 8.4 | 3.5 | 2.7 | 2.1 | 1.7 | 1.5 | | 2.9 | 11.8 | 23.2 | 43.6 |
| 16 Nov | Euromedia | 1,000 | 28.5 | 17.4 | 16.5 | 10.2 | 6.1 | 8.5 | 3.3 | 2.4 | 2.4 | | | 0.5 | 4.2 | 11.1 | 23.1 | 45.3 |
| 16 Nov | Proger Index | 800 | 29.6 | 16.5 | 16.8 | 8.2 | 6.5 | 8.0 | 3.9 | 3.0 | 2.3 | | | | 5.2 | 12.8 | 23.4 | 44.3 |
| 9–14 Nov | SWG | 1,200 | 30.1 | 16.0 | 17.0 | 8.1 | 6.8 | 8.0 | 3.8 | 2.9 | 2.1 | 1.3 | | | 3.9 | 13.1 | 22.7 | 45 |
| 11 Nov | Tecnè | 1,000 | 29.4 | 16.9 | 17.1 | 8.4 | 7.0 | 7.7 | 3.5 | 2.5 | 2.0 | | | | 5.5 | 12.3 | 22.9 | 44.8 |
| 10 Nov | Noto | – | 29.0 | 18.5 | 18.5 | 9.5 | 7.0 | 8.0 | 4.5 | 2.0 | | | | 1.0 | 2.0 | 10.5 | 25 | 46.5 |
| 8–10 Nov | Termometro Politico | 4,000 | 28.4 | 17.4 | 16.5 | 8.3 | 6.6 | 8.4 | 3.6 | 2.5 | 2.2 | 1.8 | 1.4 | | 2.9 | 11.0 | 23.5 | 43.3 |
| 7–10 Nov | Demos & Pi | 1,001 | 28.8 | 16.9 | 17.3 | 8.0 | 7.1 | 7.6 | 3.8 | 2.8 | 2.0 | | | | 5.7 | 11.5 | 23.5 | 43.9 |
| 7 Nov | EMG | 1,483 | 28.0 | 16.8 | 17.5 | 8.7 | 7.1 | 8.0 | 4.0 | 2.7 | 2.5 | 1.6 | | 1.1 | 2.0 | 10.5 | 23.5 | 44.9 |
| 2–7 Nov | SWG | 1,200 | 29.4 | 16.0 | 16.8 | 7.7 | 6.3 | 8.4 | 4.0 | 2.7 | 2.5 | 1.6 | | | 4.6 | 12.6 | 22.7 | 43.4 |
| 4 Nov | Tecnè | 1,000 | 29.0 | 17.1 | 16.9 | 8.3 | 7.0 | 7.8 | 3.6 | 2.7 | 2.0 | | | | 5.6 | 11.9 | 23.4 | 44.3 |
| 2–3 Nov | Euromedia | 1,000 | 28.7 | 16.5 | 17.0 | 9.0 | 6.5 | 8.2 | 3.5 | 2.5 | 2.5 | | | 1.0 | 4.6 | 11.7 | 22.5 | 45.2 |
| 1–3 Nov | Termometro Politico | 4,200 | 28.2 | 17.4 | 16.5 | 8.6 | 6.8 | 8.4 | 3.7 | 2.7 | 2.0 | 1.6 | 1.4 | | 2.7 | 10.8 | 23.8 | 43.6 |
| 2 Nov | Piepoli | 510 | 28.0 | 18.5 | 16.5 | 8.0 | 7.5 | 8.5 | 4.0 | 3.0 | 2.0 | | | 1.5 | 2.5 | 9.5 | 25.5 | 45 |
| 26–31 Oct | SWG | 1,200 | 29.1 | 16.3 | 16.3 | 7.9 | 6.5 | 8.6 | 4.1 | 3.0 | 2.5 | 1.4 | | | 4.3 | 12.8 | 23.4 | 43.5 |
| 28 Oct | EMG | 1,522 | 27.6 | 17.3 | 17.0 | 8.4 | 7.5 | 8.3 | 4.0 | 2.9 | 2.3 | 1.4 | | 1.0 | 2.3 | 10.3 | 24.2 | 44.5 |
| 28 Oct | Tecnè | 1,000 | 28.1 | 17.2 | 16.8 | 8.5 | 7.4 | 7.9 | 3.7 | 2.6 | 1.9 | | | | 5.9 | 10.9 | 23.5 | 44 |
| 25–27 Oct | Ipsos | 1,000 | 29.8 | 18.8 | 16.0 | 8.0 | 6.1 | 7.1 | 3.7 | 2.9 | 2.4 | 2.1 | 1.0 | 1.1 | 1.0 | 11.0 | 25.4 | 45 |
| 25–27 Oct | Termometro Politico | 4,000 | 28.1 | 17.8 | 16.6 | 8.4 | 6.8 | 8.2 | 3.5 | 2.7 | 2.1 | 1.6 | 1.4 | | 2.8 | 10.3 | 24 | 43.3 |
| 26 Oct | Piepoli | 516 | 27.0 | 18.5 | 16.5 | 8.5 | 8.0 | 8.5 | 4.0 | 2.5 | 2.0 | | | 1.5 | 3.0 | 8.5 | 25 | 45 |
| 26 Oct | Proger Index | 800 | 28.0 | 17.6 | 16.2 | 8.6 | 6.8 | 8.1 | 4.1 | 3.2 | 2.2 | | | | 5.2 | 10.4 | 24.9 | 43.4 |
| 26 Oct | Euromedia | 800 | 28.4 | 17.0 | 17.3 | 9.5 | 6.7 | 8.3 | 3.4 | 2.6 | 2.6 | | | 0.8 | 3.4 | 11.1 | 23 | 45.4 |
| 19–24 Oct | SWG | 1,200 | 28.3 | 17.0 | 16.4 | 8.6 | 6.2 | 8.4 | 4.1 | 3.1 | 2.6 | 1.2 | | | 4.1 | 11.3 | 24.2 | 43.1 |
| 22 Oct | Giorgia Meloni is sworn in as Prime Minister; the Meloni government is born | | | | | | | | | | | | | | | | | |
| 21 Oct | President Sergio Mattarella tasks Giorgia Meloni to form the new government | | | | | | | | | | | | | | | | | |
| 21 Oct | Tecnè | 1,000 | 28.0 | 17.5 | 16.6 | 8.4 | 7.6 | 7.6 | 3.6 | 2.7 | 1.8 | | | | 6.2 | 10.5 | 23.8 | 44 |
| 20 Oct | EMG | 1,571 | 27.3 | 17.7 | 16.7 | 8.4 | 7.6 | 8.2 | 3.9 | 2.9 | 2.3 | 1.3 | | 1.0 | 2.7 | 9.6 | 24.5 | 44.3 |
| 20 Oct | BiDiMedia | – | 27.1 | 18.2 | 16.2 | 8.5 | 7.9 | 8.2 | 3.8 | 2.6 | 2.1 | 1.3 | 1.0 | 0.7 | 2.4 | 8.9 | 24.6 | 44.2 |
| 18–20 Oct | Termometro Politico | 3,400 | 27.6 | 17.8 | 16.3 | 8.7 | 7.0 | 8.2 | 3.7 | 2.9 | 1.9 | 1.5 | 1.3 | | 3.1 | 9.8 | 24.4 | 43.3 |
| 17 Oct | EMG | 1,615 | 27.2 | 18.0 | 16.5 | 8.5 | 7.7 | 8.0 | 3.8 | 2.8 | 2.1 | 1.2 | | 1.0 | 3.2 | 9.2 | 24.6 | 44.4 |
| 12–17 Oct | SWG | 1,200 | 27.4 | 17.0 | 16.7 | 8.5 | 7.5 | 8.1 | 4.1 | 3.3 | 2.5 | 1.1 | | | 3.8 | 10.4 | 24.4 | 43.4 |
| 16 Oct | Noto | – | 28.0 | 18.5 | 16.0 | 8.5 | 8.0 | 8.0 | 4.0 | 2.5 | | | | 1.0 | 5.5 | 9.5 | 25 | 45.5 |
| 14–15 Oct | Euromedia | 1,000 | 27.0 | 17.5 | 17.2 | 8.5 | 7.3 | 8.7 | 3.4 | 2.5 | 2.4 | | | 1.1 | 4.4 | 9.5 | 23.4 | 43.9 |
| 8–14 Oct | Lab2101 | 1,000 | 27.2 | 17.6 | 17.4 | 8.9 | 7.4 | 8.3 | 3.9 | 2.8 | 1.9 | | | 0.7 | 3.9 | 9.6 | 24.3 | 44.2 |
| 13 Oct | The new parliament is set up | | | | | | | | | | | | | | | | | |
| 11–13 Oct | Termometro Politico | 4,100 | 27.1 | 18.4 | 16.5 | 8.5 | 7.5 | 7.8 | 3.6 | 2.8 | 2.0 | 1.4 | 1.4 | | 3.0 | 8.7 | 24.8 | 43.1 |
| 12 Oct | Proger Index | 800 | 27.0 | 17.8 | 16.1 | 8.4 | 8.0 | 8.0 | 3.9 | 3.0 | 2.2 | | | | 5.6 | 9.2 | 24.7 | 43.4 |
| 5–10 Oct | SWG | 1,200 | 27.5 | 17.5 | 17.0 | 8.3 | 7.4 | 8.0 | 3.8 | 3.1 | 2.4 | | | 1.0 | 4.0 | 10.0 | 24.4 | 44.2 |
| 5–6 Oct | Termometro Politico | 3,700 | 26.6 | 18.7 | 16.0 | 8.6 | 7.9 | 8.0 | 3.8 | 2.6 | 2.1 | 1.4 | 1.3 | 0.7 | 2.3 | 7.9 | 25.1 | 43.8 |
| 4–6 Oct | Demos & Pi | 1,004 | 26.4 | 17.8 | 16.8 | 7.9 | 8.0 | 7.8 | 4.2 | 3.4 | 2.1 | | | | 5.6 | 8.6 | 25.4 | 42.3 |
| 28 Sep – 3 Oct | SWG | 1,200 | 26.8 | 18.1 | 16.5 | 8.2 | 7.6 | 8.3 | 4.0 | 3.3 | 2.2 | | | 1.2 | 3.8 | 8.7 | 25.4 | 43.8 |
| 28 Sep | Euromedia | 800 | 26.2 | 19.0 | 16.2 | 8.3 | 8.1 | 7.9 | 3.5 | 2.7 | 2.4 | | | 0.9 | 4.8 | 7.2 | 25.2 | 43.5 |
| 25 Sep | Election results | —N/a | 26.0 | 19.1 | 15.4 | 8.8 | 8.1 | 7.8 | 3.6 | 2.8 | 1.9 | 1.4 | 1.2 | 0.9 | 3.0 | 6.9 | 26.1 | 43.8 |
| 25 Sep | General election; regional elections in Sicily (CDX hold) | | | | | | | | | | | | | | | | | |

== Seat projections ==
=== Seat projections with the Rosatellum electoral law ===
==== Rosatellum seat projections with CSX vs. CDX ====
| Polling | | | | Parties | | | | | | | | | | | | Coalitions | | |
| Fieldwork date | Polling firm | Sample size | House | FdI | PD | M5S | Lega | FI | A | IV | AVS | +E | NM | FN | Others | CSX | CDX | Majority |
|---|---|---|---|---|---|---|---|---|---|---|---|---|---|---|---|---|---|---|
| 21 Sep 2026 | SWG | — | Chamber of Deputies | – | – | – | – | – | 8 | — | – | – | – | 20 | – | 200 | 159 | Hung (–1) |
| 21 Sep 2026 | Only Numbers | — | Chamber of Deputies | 69 | 63 | 35 | 19 | 20 | 8 | – | 18 | – | – | 19 | 5 | 190 | 178 | Hung (–11) |
| 21 Sep 2026 | Only Numbers | — | Senate of the Republic | 37 | 33 | 17 | 5 | 12 | 1 | – | 9 | – | – | 11 | 3 | 100 | 85 | Hung (–1) |
| 15 Sep 2026 | Quorum | — | Chamber of Deputies | – | – | – | – | – | 10 | – | – | – | – | 20 | 3 | 198 | 169 | Hung (–3) |
| 15 Sep 2026 | Quorum | — | Senate of the Republic | – | – | – | – | – | 3 | – | – | – | – | 10 | 2 | 107 | 77 | 6 |
| 4 Sep 2026 | Cassandra | — | Chamber of Deputies | – | – | – | – | – | 0 | – | – | – | – | 21 | 4 | 201 | 166 | 1 |
| 4 Sep 2026 | Cassandra | — | Senate of the Republic | – | – | – | – | – | 0 | – | – | – | – | 10 | 3 | 107 | 77 | 6 |

==== Rosatellum seat projections with CSX vs. CDX+FN ====
| Polling | | | | Parties | | | | | | | | | | | | Coalitions | | |
| Fieldwork date | Polling firm | Sample size | House | FdI | PD | M5S | Lega | FI | A | IV | AVS | +E | NM | FN | Others | CSX | CDX | Majority |
|---|---|---|---|---|---|---|---|---|---|---|---|---|---|---|---|---|---|---|
| 15 Sep 2026 | Quorum | — | Chamber of Deputies | – | – | – | – | – | 11 | – | – | – | – | – | 3 | 167 | 219 | 18 |
| 15 Sep 2026 | Quorum | — | Senate of the Republic | – | – | – | – | – | 3 | – | – | – | – | – | 3 | 88 | 106 | 5 |

==== Rosatellum seat projections with CSX without IV vs. CDX ====
| Polling | | | | Parties | | | | | | | | | | | | Coalitions | | |
| Fieldwork date | Polling firm | Sample size | House | FdI | PD | M5S | Lega | FI | A | IV | AVS | +E | NM | FN | Others | CSX | CDX | Majority |
|---|---|---|---|---|---|---|---|---|---|---|---|---|---|---|---|---|---|---|
| 21 Sep 2026 | SWG | — | Chamber of Deputies | – | – | – | – | – | 8 | — | – | – | – | 21 | – | 191 | 167 | Hung (–10) |

=== Seat projections with the Stabilicum electoral law ===
==== Stabilicum seat projections with CSX vs. CDX ====
| Polling | | | | Parties | | | | | | | | | | | | Coalitions | | |
| Fieldwork date | Polling firm | Sample size | House | FdI | PD | M5S | Lega | FI | A | IV | AVS | +E | NM | FN | Others | CSX | CDX | Majority |
|---|---|---|---|---|---|---|---|---|---|---|---|---|---|---|---|---|---|---|
| 2–9 Nov 2026 | Ixè | 1,000 | Chamber of Deputies | – | – | – | – | – | – | – | – | – | – | 25 | 1 | 225 | 149 | 24 |
| 2–9 Nov 2026 | Ixè | 1,000 | Senate of the Republic | – | – | – | – | – | – | – | – | – | – | 10 | 6 | 115 | 74 | 12 |
| 2–9 Nov | Termometro Politico | 2,400 | Chamber of Deputies | 98 | 113 | 66 | 21 | 25 | – | 13 | 33 | – | 3 | 23 | 5 3 – South Tyrol People's Party; 2 – Overseas and Aosta Valley constituencies | 225 | 147 | 24 |
| 26–29 Oct 2026 | Ipsos | 1,000 | Chamber of Deputies | – | – | – | – | – | 12 (Note: Action and other centrist parties) | – | – | – | – | 27 | 3 | 221 | 137 | 20 |
| 26–29 Oct 2026 | Ipsos | 1,000 | Senate of the Republic | – | – | – | – | – | 6 | – | – | – | – | 12 | 3 | 110 | 69 | 9 |
| 27–28 Oct 2026 | Quorum | 810 | Chamber of Deputies | 96 | 106 | 69 | 19 | 23 | 11 | – | 32 | – | – | 23 | 21 | 220 | 141 | 19 |
| 14–19 Oct 2026 | SWG | 1,200 | Chamber of Deputies | 98 | 70–73 (Note: Other seats with the majority jackpot) | 41–45 | 17 | 24 | 10 | 7–8 | 22 | – | 3 (Note: Us Moderates with South calls North) | 17–18 | 86 70 – Majority jackpot for CSX; 16 – Overseas, Aosta Valley, and Trentino-Alto Adige/Südtirol constituencies | 214 | 142 | 13 |
| 14–19 Oct 2026 | SWG | 1,200 | Senate of the Republic | 47 | 30–34 | 20–22 | 8 | 12 | 5 | 3–4 | 11 | – | 2 | 9 | 51 70 – Majority jackpot for CSX; 11 – Overseas, Aosta Valley, and Trentino-Alto Adige/Südtirol constituencies 5 – Senators for life | 106 | 69 | 1 |
| 14–15 Oct 2026 | Only Numbers | 800 | Chamber of Deputies | – | – | – | – | – | – | – | – | – | – | – | 38 | 218 | 144 | 17 |
| 14–15 Oct 2026 | Only Numbers | 800 | Senate of the Republic | – | – | – | – | – | – | – | – | – | – | – | 19 | 110 | 71 | 9 |
| 5–8 Oct 2026 | Sigma Piave | 800 | Chamber of Deputies | – | – | – | – | – | 11 | – | – | – | – | 25 | 6 | 221 | 137 | 20 |
| 5–8 Oct 2026 | Sigma Piave | 800 | Senate of the Republic | – | – | – | – | – | 3 | – | – | – | – | 10 | 9 5 – Senators for life 4 – Others | 111 | 72 | 8 |
| 5–6 Oct 2026 | Quorum | 805 | Chamber of Deputies | – | – | – | – | – | 11 | – | – | – | – | 26 | 3 | 221 | 139 | 20 |
| 5–6 Oct 2026 | Quorum | 805 | Senate of the Republic | – | – | – | – | – | 3 | – | – | – | – | 12 | 8 5 – Senators for life 3 – Others | 112 | 70 | 9 |
| 21–24 Sep 2026 | Ipsos | 1,000 | Chamber of Deputies | – | – | – | – | – | 17 | – | – | – | – | 30 | 4 | 219 | 130 | 18 |
| 21–24 Sep 2026 | Ipsos | 1,000 | Senate of the Republic | – | – | – | – | – | 8 | – | – | – | – | 15 | 4 | 109 | 64 | 8 |
| 21–22 Sep | EMG | 1,000 | Chamber of Deputies | 87 | 110 | 62 | 27 | 28 | – | 13 | 32 | 3 | 6 | 24 | 8 (Note: Seats reserved for the overseas constituency) | 220 | 148 | 19 |
| 21 Sep | SWG | — | Chamber of Deputies | 89 | 71 | 44 | 18 | 23 | 10 | 18 | 22 | – | 3 | 26 | 70 (Note: Majority bonus given to the coalition reaching 42.0%) | 215 | 133 | 14 |
| 21 Sep 2026 | Only Numbers | — | Chamber of Deputies | 87 | 111 | 62 | 23 | 25 | 11 | 11 | 34 | – | 3 | 24 | 5 | 219 | 141 | 18 |
| 21 Sep 2026 | Only Numbers | — | Senate of the Republic | 43 | 56 | 30 | 10 | 12 | 5 | 5 | 17 | – | 2 | 12 | 3 | 110 | 70 | 7 |
| 16 Sep 2026 | Atlante elettorale | — | Chamber of Deputies | 88 | 103 | 62 | 19 | 25 | 13 | 21 | 32 | – | 4 | 25 | – | 218 | 136 | 17 |
| 16 Sep 2026 | Atlante elettorale | — | Senate of the Republic | – | – | – | – | – | 6 | – | – | – | – | 13 | – | 109 | 68 | 6 |
| 16 Sep 2026 | Cassandra | — | Chamber of Deputies | 93 | 112 | 64 | 20 | 26 | – | 10 | 33 | – | 4 | 27 | 3 | 219 | 143 | 18 |
| 16 Sep 2026 | Cassandra | — | Senate of the Republic | 48 | 60 | 34 | 7 | 14 | – | 2 | 15 | – | – | 14 | 2 | 111 | 69 | 8 |
| 15–16 Sep 2026 | Piepoli | — | Chamber of Deputies | – | – | – | – | – | 10 | – | – | – | – | 24 | 3 | 222 | 141 | 21 |
| 15 Sep 2026 | Quorum | — | Chamber of Deputies | 91 | 110 | 62 | 19 | 26 | 12 | 12 | 34 | 3 | 3 | 25 | 3 | 221 | 139 | 20 |
| 15 Sep 2026 | Quorum | — | Senate of the Republic | 44 | 55 | 30 | 10 | 13 | 6 | 6 | 17 | 2 | 2 | 12 | 3 | 110 | 69 | 7 |
| 4–6 Sep 2026 | BiDiMedia | 1,000 | Chamber of Deputies | 89 | 112 | 55 | 18 | 25 | 14 | 10 | 35 | 0 | 3 | 23 | 16 | 212 | 135 | 11 |

==== Stabilicum seat projections with CSX vs. CDX+FN ====
| Polling | | | | Parties | | | | | | | | | | | | Coalitions | | |
| Fieldwork date | Polling firm | Sample size | House | FdI | PD | M5S | Lega | FI | A | IV | AVS | +E | NM | FN | Others | CSX | CDX | Majority |
|---|---|---|---|---|---|---|---|---|---|---|---|---|---|---|---|---|---|---|
| 26–29 Oct 2026 | Ipsos | 1,000 | Chamber of Deputies | – | – | – | – | – | 11 | – | – | – | – | – | 3 | 163 | 223 | 22 |
| 26–29 Oct 2026 | Ipsos | 1,000 | Senate of the Republic | – | – | – | – | – | 5 | – | – | – | – | – | 3 | 78 | 114 | 13 |
| 14–15 Oct 2026 | Only Numbers | 800 | Chamber of Deputies | – | – | – | – | – | – | – | – | – | – | – | 17 | 158 | 225 | 24 |
| 14–15 Oct 2026 | Only Numbers | 800 | Senate of the Republic | – | – | – | – | – | – | – | – | – | – | – | 8 | 75 | 117 | 16 |
| 5–6 Oct 2026 | Quorum | 805 | Chamber of Deputies | – | – | – | – | – | 12 | – | – | – | – | – | 3 | 162 | 223 | 22 |
| 5–6 Oct 2026 | Quorum | 805 | Senate of the Republic | – | – | – | – | – | 3 | – | – | – | – | – | 8 5 – Senators for life 3 – Others | 80 | 114 | 11 |
| 21–24 Sep 2026 | Ipsos | 1,000 | Chamber of Deputies | – | – | – | – | – | 20 | – | – | – | – | – | 4 | 154 | 222 | 21 |
| 21–24 Sep 2026 | Ipsos | 1,000 | Senate of the Republic | – | – | – | – | – | 10 | – | – | – | – | – | 4 | 76 | 110 | 9 |
| 16 Sep 2026 | Cassandra | — | Chamber of Deputies | 125 | 84 | 48 | 25 | 34 | 0 | 8 | 26 | 0 | 4 | 35 | 11 | 166 | 223 | 22 |
| 16 Sep 2026 | Cassandra | — | Senate of the Republic | 71 | 38 | 24 | 11 | 19 | 0 | 0 | 10 | 0 | 1 | 20 | 11 | 72 | 122 | 21 |
| 15–16 Sep 2026 | Piepoli | — | Chamber of Deputies | – | – | – | – | – | 11 | – | – | – | – | – | 3 | 160 | 226 | 15 |
| 15 Sep 2026 | Quorum | — | Chamber of Deputies | 125 | 79 | 45 | 26 | 35 | 14 | 8 | 25 | 0 | 5 | 35 | 3 | 157 | 226 | 25 |
| 15 Sep 2026 | Quorum | — | Senate of the Republic | 63 | 37 | 21 | 13 | 19 | 6 | 4 | 12 | 0 | 3 | 19 | 3 | 74 | 117 | 14 |

==== Stabilicum seat projections with CSX (without IV) vs. CDX vs. FN vs. A ====
| Polling | | | | Parties | | | | | | | | | | | | Coalitions | | |
| Fieldwork date | Polling firm | Sample size | House | FdI | PD | M5S | Lega | FI | A | IV | AVS | +E | NM | FN | Others | CSX | CDX | Majority |
|---|---|---|---|---|---|---|---|---|---|---|---|---|---|---|---|---|---|---|
| 21 Sep 2026 | SWG | — | Chamber of Deputies | 112 | 86 | 56 | 22 | 29 | 13 | 0 | 26 | 6 | 4 | 33 | – | 191 | 167 | Hung (–30) |

==== Stabilicum seat projections with CSX (IV and +E as separate lists) vs. CDX vs. FN vs. A ====
| Polling | | | | Parties | | | | | | | | | | | | Coalitions | | |
| Fieldwork date | Polling firm | Sample size | House | FdI | PD | M5S | Lega | FI | A | IV | AVS | +E | NM | FN | Others | CSX | CDX | Majority |
|---|---|---|---|---|---|---|---|---|---|---|---|---|---|---|---|---|---|---|
| 8 Sep 2026 | Atlante elettorale | — | Chamber of Deputies | 92 | 111 | 63 | 21 | 26 | 11 | 13 | 33 | 0 | 4 | 25 | 1 | 220 | 143 | 19 |

==== Stabilicum seat projections with CSX (CR as single centrist list) vs. CDX vs. FN vs. A–PLD ====
| Polling | | | | Parties | | | | | | | | | | | Coalitions | | |
| Fieldwork date | Polling firm | Sample size | House | FdI | PD | M5S | Lega | FI | A–PLD | CR | AVS | NM | FN | Others | CSX | CDX | Majority |
|---|---|---|---|---|---|---|---|---|---|---|---|---|---|---|---|---|---|
| 8 Sep 2026 | Atlante elettorale | — | Chamber of Deputies | 90 | 108 | 61 | 20 | 25 | 14 | 22 (Note: Reformist House joint list with Italia Viva, More Europe, the Italian Socialist Party, and the Italian Republican Party) | 31 | 4 | 24 | 1 | 222 | 139 | 21 |

==== Stabilicum seat projections with run-off ====
| Polling | | | First round | | | | | | Runoff | | |
| Fieldwork date | Polling firm | Sample size | CSX | CDX | FN | A | Others | Lead | CSX | CDX | Undecided |
|---|---|---|---|---|---|---|---|---|---|---|---|
| 4–6 Sep 2026 | BiDiMedia | 1,000 | 44.2 | 41.1 | 7.0 | 4.3 | 3.4 | 3.1 | 49.7 | 50.3 | 28 |

| Polling | | | | Parties | | | | | | | | | | | | Coalitions | |
| Fieldwork date | Polling firm | Sample size | House | FdI | PD | M5S | Lega | FI | A–PLD | IV | AVS | NM | FN | Others | CSX | CDX | Majority |
|---|---|---|---|---|---|---|---|---|---|---|---|---|---|---|---|---|---|
| 4–6 Sep 2026 | BiDiMedia | 1,000 | Chamber of Deputies | 136 | 76 | 37 | 27 | 37 | 14 | 6 | 23 | 5 | 23 | 16 | 142 | 205 | 4 |

== Government approval rating ==
=== 2026 ===
| Fieldwork date | Polling firm | Sample size | Approve | Disapprove | Don't know | Lead |
|---|---|---|---|---|---|---|
| 17–19 Nov | Termometro Politico | 3,400 | 38.5 | 61.0 | 0.5 | 22.5 |
| 14–16 Nov | Quorum | 810 | 38.0 | 58.0 | 4.0 | 20.0 |
| 10–12 Nov | Termometro Politico | 3,100 | 38.7 | 60.8 | 0.5 | 22.1 |
| 10–11 Nov | BiDiMedia | 1,000 | 35.0 | 62.0 | 3.0 | 27.0 |
| 7–9 Nov | Quorum | 810 | 34.0 | 61.0 | 5.0 | 27.0 |
| 2–9 Nov | Ixè | 1,000 | 38.0 | 61.7 | —N/a | 23.7 |
| 4–5 Nov | Termometro Politico | 2,400 | 40.1 | 59.7 | 0.2 | 19.6 |
| 27–29 Oct | Termometro Politico | 2,700 | 39.8 | 59.7 | 0.5 | 19.9 |
| 27–28 Oct | Quorum | 810 | 33.0 | 64.0 | 3.0 | 31.0 |
| 21–23 Oct | SWG | 800 | 41.0 | 59.0 | —N/a | 18.0 |
| 20–22 Oct | Termometro Politico | 2,400 | 39.4 | 60.3 | 0.3 | 20.9 |
| 13–15 Oct | Termometro Politico | 2,400 | 39.0 | 60.5 | 0.5 | 21.5 |
| 6–8 Oct | Termometro Politico | 2,500 | 38.8 | 60.8 | 0.4 | 22.0 |
| 5–6 Oct | Quorum | 805 | 35.0 | 61.0 | 4.0 | 26.0 |
| 22–24 Sep | Termometro Politico | 2,500 | 38.1 | 61.4 | 0.5 | 23.3 |
| 21–24 Sep | Ipsos | 1,000 | 40.0 | 60.0 | —N/a | 20.0 |
| 18–22 Sep | Quorum | 810 | 33.0 | 59.0 | 8.0 | 26.0 |
| 16–17 Sep | Termometro Politico | 2,400 | 39.3 | 60.0 | 0.7 | 20.7 |
| 4–6 Sep | BiDiMedia | 1,000 | 32.0 | 66.0 | 2.0 | 34.0 |
| 1–3 Sep | Termometro Politico | 2,200 | 36.5 | 63.5 | —N/a | 27.0 |
| 31 Aug – 3 Sep | Quorum | 800 | 36.0 | 59.0 | 5.0 | 23.0 |
| 26–28 Aug | Termometro Politico | 2,600 | 37.9 | 61.5 | 0.6 | 23.6 |
| 22–24 Aug | BiDiMedia | 1,000 | 32.0 | 64.0 | 4.0 | 32.0 |
| 2–5 Aug | BiDiMedia | 1,000 | 32.0 | 64.0 | 4.0 | 32.0 |
| 28–30 Jul | Termometro Politico | 2,400 | 38.8 | 60.7 | 0.5 | 21.9 |
| 14–28 Jul | EMG | 1,000 | 35.0 | 65.0 | —N/a | 30.0 |
| 22–23 Jul | Termometro Politico | 2,300 | 38.9 | 60.7 | 0.4 | 21.8 |
| 21–22 Jul | Quorum | 810 | 35.0 | 58.0 | 7.0 | 23.0 |
| 14–16 Jul | Termometro Politico | 2,700 | 37.5 | 62.0 | 0.5 | 24.5 |
| 3–16 Jul | EMG | 1,000 | 35.0 | 65.0 | —N/a | 30.0 |
| 8–9 Jul | Termometro Politico | 2,100 | 36.8 | 63.2 | —N/a | 26.4 |
| 6–7 Jul | EMG | 1,000 | 34.0 | 66.0 | —N/a | 32.0 |
| 30 Jun – 2 Jul | Termometro Politico | 2,000 | 37.7 | 62.0 | 0.3 | 24.3 |
| 30 Jun – 1 Jul | Quorum | 810 | 35.0 | 55.0 | 10.0 | 20.0 |
| 24–25 Jun | Termometro Politico | 2,500 | 38.5 | 61.5 | —N/a | 22.0 |
| 18–19 Jun | BiDiMedia | 1,000 | 35.0 | 63.0 | 2.0 | 28.0 |
| 17–18 Jun | Termometro Politico | 2,500 | 38.7 | 60.9 | 0.4 | 22.2 |
| 03–16 Jun | EMG | 1,000 | 37.0 | 63.0 | —N/a | 26.0 |
| 16–17 Jun | Quorum | 825 | 35.0 | 55.0 | 10.0 | 20.0 |
| 9–11 Jun | Termometro Politico | 2,100 | 37.9 | 61.4 | 0.7 | 23.5 |
| 8–9 Jun | EMG | 1,000 | 36.0 | 64.0 | —N/a | 28.0 |
| 2–4 Jun | Termometro Politico | 2,200 | 38.1 | 61.2 | 0.7 | 23.1 |
| 20 May – 2 Jun | EMG | 1,000 | 37.0 | 63.0 | —N/a | 26.0 |
| 27–28 May | Termometro Politico | 2,400 | 39.2 | 60.4 | 0.4 | 21.2 |
| 25–28 May | Ipsos | 1,000 | 40.0 | 60.0 | —N/a | 20.0 |
| 26–27 May | Quorum | 815 | 36.0 | 57.0 | 7.0 | 21.0 |
| 19–21 May | Termometro Politico | 2,400 | 38.9 | 52.2 | —N/a | 13.3 |
| 06–19 May | EMG | 1,000 | 36.0 | 64.0 | —N/a | 28.0 |
| 11–12 May | EMG | 1,000 | 36.0 | 64.0 | —N/a | 28.0 |
| 06–8 May | Termometro Politico | 2,300 | 37.1 | 62.5 | —N/a | 25.4 |
| 04–5 May | Demos&Pi | 999 | 43.0 | 57.0 | —N/a | 14.0 |
| 23 Apr – 5 May | EMG | 1,000 | 37.0 | 63.0 | —N/a | 26.0 |
| 27–29 Apr | Ipsos | 1,000 | 36.0 | 52.0 | 12.0 | 16.0 |
| 27–28 Apr | Quorum | 813 | 33.0 | 59.0 | 8.0 | 26.0 |
| 21–23 Apr | Termometro Politico | 2,500 | 36.5 | 63.3 | 0.2 | 26.8 |
| 14–16 Apr | Termometro Politico | 2,700 | 38.1 | 61.3 | 0.6 | 23.2 |
| 13–14 Apr | BiDiMedia | 1,000 | 35.0 | 63.0 | 2.0 | 28.0 |
| 11–13 Apr | Quorum | 815 | 34.0 | 57.0 | 9.0 | 23.0 |
| 7–9 Apr | Termometro Politico | 2,500 | 39.1 | 60.6 | 0.3 | 21.5 |
| 26 Mar – 8 Apr | EMG | 1,000 | 38.0 | 62.0 | —N/a | 24.0 |
| 31 Mar – 2 Apr | Termometro Politico | 2,700 | 38.7 | 60.8 | 0.5 | 22.1 |
| 24–26 Mar | Termometro Politico | 3,000 | 38.7 | 61.1 | 0.2 | 22.4 |
| 12–25 Mar | EMG | 1,000 | 39.0 | 61.0 | —N/a | 22.0 |
| 3–6 Mar | Termometro Politico | 2,700 | 38.4 | 61.1 | 0.5 | 22.7 |
| 3–4 Mar | Quorum | 817 | 32.0 | 57.0 | 11.0 | 25.0 |
| 24–26 Feb | Termometro Politico | 2,800 | 38.9 | 60.5 | 0.6 | 21.6 |
| 24–25 Feb | Quorum | 809 | 34.0 | 57.0 | 9.0 | 23.0 |
| 17–19 Feb | Termometro Politico | 2,900 | 40.0 | 59.4 | 0.6 | 19.4 |
| 17–18 Feb | Quorum | 813 | 32.0 | 56.0 | 12.0 | 24.0 |
| 11–14 Feb | BiDiMedia | 2,000 | 37.0 | 58.0 | 5.0 | 21.0 |
| 10–12 Feb | Termometro Politico | 2,500 | 37.9 | 61.4 | 0.7 | 23.5 |
| 9–10 Feb | EMG | 1,000 | 38.0 | 62.0 | —N/a | 24.0 |
| 6–9 Feb | Quorum | 815 | 32.0 | 59.0 | 9.0 | 27.0 |
| 3–5 Feb | Termometro Politico | 2,900 | 39.2 | 60.4 | 0.4 | 21.2 |
| 27–29 Jan | Termometro Politico | 2,700 | 39.2 | 60.3 | 0.5 | 21.1 |
| 26–27 Jan | EMG | 1,000 | 39.0 | 61.0 | —N/a | 22.0 |
| 20–22 Jan | Termometro Politico | 2,600 | 38.0 | 61.6 | 0.4 | 23.6 |
| 19–20 Jan | Quorum | 804 | 33.0 | 62.0 | 5.0 | 29.0 |
| 13–15 Jan | Termometro Politico | 2,800 | 39.5 | 59.8 | 0.7 | 20.3 |
| 31 Dec – 7 Jan | EMG | 1,000 | 40.0 | 60.0 | —N/a | 20.0 |

=== 2025 ===
| Fieldwork date | Polling firm | Sample size | Approve | Disapprove | Don't know | Lead |
|---|---|---|---|---|---|---|
| 18–19 Dec | Quorum | 1,201 | 30.0 | 64.0 | 6.0 | 34.0 |
| 16–18 Dec | Termometro Politico | 2,600 | 40.1 | 59.4 | 0.5 | 19.3 |
| 15–18 Dec | Ipsos | 1,000 | 36.0 | 50.0 | 14.0 | 14.0 |
| 9–11 Dec | Termometro Politico | 2,700 | 38.5 | 61.0 | 0.5 | 22.5 |
| 4–5 Dec | Quorum | 805 | 29.0 | 62.0 | 9.0 | 33.0 |
| 26–27 Nov | Termometro Politico | 2,200 | 40.1 | 59.5 | 0.4 | 19.4 |
| 24–27 Nov | Ipsos | 1,000 | 37.0 | 52.0 | 11.0 | 15.0 |
| 19–20 Nov | Termometro Politico | 2,600 | 39.8 | 59.8 | 0.4 | 20.0 |
| 11–13 Nov | Termometro Politico | 2,600 | 41.1 | 58.4 | 0.5 | 17.3 |
| 4–6 Nov | Termometro Politico | 2,400 | 40.3 | 58.9 | 0.8 | 18.6 |
| 30–31 Oct | Quorum | 800 | 32.0 | 59.0 | 9.0 | 27.0 |
| 28–30 Oct | Termometro Politico | 3,100 | 40.1 | 59.3 | 0.6 | 19.2 |
| 21–23 Oct | Termometro Politico | 3,000 | 38.7 | 60.7 | 0.6 | 22.0 |
| 14–16 Oct | Termometro Politico | 3,000 | 40.5 | 58.8 | 0.7 | 18.3 |
| 7–9 Oct | Termometro Politico | 2,600 | 40.5 | 58.8 | 0.7 | 18.3 |
| 2–5 Oct | BiDiMedia | 1,000 | 35.0 | 62.0 | 3.0 | 27.0 |
| 30 Sep – 2 Oct | Termometro Politico | 2,800 | 39.6 | 60.0 | 0.4 | 20.4 |
| 16–18 Sep | Termometro Politico | 2,800 | 37.9 | 61.7 | 0.4 | 23.8 |
| 15–18 Sep | Demos & Pi | 1,028 | 39.0 | 61.0 | —N/a | 22.0 |
| 9–11 Sep | Termometro Politico | 2,700 | 38.0 | 61.3 | 0.7 | 23.0 |
| 3–5 Sep | Quorum | 805 | 34.0 | 62.0 | 4.0 | 28.0 |
| 2–4 Sep | Termometro Politico | 3,200 | 36.3 | 63.3 | 0.4 | 27.0 |
| 23–25 Aug | BiDiMedia | 1,000 | 36.0 | 62.0 | 2.0 | 26.0 |
| 5–7 Aug | Termometro Politico | 3,200 | 36.9 | 62.6 | 0.5 | 26.0 |
| 29–31 Jul | Termometro Politico | 2,500 | 36.3 | 63.1 | 0.6 | 26.8 |
| 25–30 Jul | Quorum | 800 | 32.0 | 63.0 | 5.0 | 26.0 |
| 22–24 Jul | Termometro Politico | 2,700 | 37.4 | 61.9 | 0.7 | 24.5 |
| 21–24 Jul | Ipsos | 1,000 | 36.0 | 51.0 | 13.0 | 15.0 |
| 16–17 Jul | Termometro Politico | 2,600 | 36.2 | 63.3 | 0.5 | 27.1 |
| 11–14 Jul | Quorum | 800 | 34.0 | 62.0 | 4.0 | 28.0 |
| 8–10 Jul | Termometro Politico | 2,800 | 36.9 | 62.5 | 0.6 | 25.6 |
| 1–3 Jul | Termometro Politico | 2,600 | 36.6 | 63.0 | 0.4 | 26.4 |
| 24–27 Jun | Termometro Politico | 2,800 | 40.5 | 59.1 | 0.4 | 8.6 |
| 24–26 Jun | Ipsos | 800 | 40.0 | 48.0 | 12.0 | 8.0 |
| 17–19 Jun | Termometro Politico | 2,900 | 38.8 | 60.5 | 0.7 | 21.7 |
| 12–13 Jun | Quorum | 802 | 37.0 | 60.0 | 3.0 | 23.0 |
| 10–12 Jun | Termometro Politico | 3,500 | 40.7 | 58.1 | 1.2 | 17.4 |
| 1–5 Jun | BidiMedia | 1,000 | 35.0 | 59.0 | 6.0 | 24.0 |
| 27–29 May | Ipsos | 1,000 | 38.0 | 52.0 | 10.0 | 14.0 |
| 14–15 May | Tecnè | — | 41.8 | 50.8 | 7.4 | 9.0 |
| 7–8 May | Tecnè | 1,003 | 42.4 | 49.8 | 7.8 | 7.4 |
| 9–10 Apr | Tecnè | 1,000 | 42.0 | 50.3 | 7.7 | 8.3 |
| 2–4 Apr | Quorum | 806 | 36.0 | 59.0 | 5.0 | 23.0 |
| 20–22 Mar | Termometro Politico | 2,700 | 39.4 | 60.1 | 0.5 | 20.7 |
| 11–13 Mar | Termometro Politico | 3,000 | 42.4 | 57.2 | 0.5 | 14.8 |
| 6–7 Mar | Quorum | 804 | 37.0 | 55.0 | 8.0 | 18.0 |
| 4–6 Mar | Termometro Politico | 2,900 | 42.1 | 57.6 | 0.3 | 15.5 |
| 25–27 Feb | Ipsos | 1,000 | 35.0 | 51.0 | 14.0 | 16.0 |
| 25–27 Feb | Termometro Politico | 3,000 | 42.5 | 57.3 | 0.2 | 14.8 |
| 18–20 Feb | Termometro Politico | 2,800 | 42.1 | 57.4 | 0.5 | 15.3 |
| 12–13 Feb | Termometro Politico | 2,700 | 43.0 | 56.4 | 0.6 | 13.4 |
| 6–7 Feb | Quorum | 804 | 39.0 | 52.0 | 9.0 | 13.0 |
| 5–6 Feb | Termometro Politico | 2,700 | 43.9 | 55.8 | 0.3 | 11.9 |
| 28–30 Feb | Termometro Politico | 2,900 | 43.5 | 56.3 | 0.2 | 12.8 |
| 23–24 Jan | Tecnè | 1,001 | 41.8 | 50.8 | 7.4 | 9.0 |
| 21–23 Jan | Termometro Politico | 2,900 | 42.9 | 56.6 | 0.5 | 13.7 |
| 14–16 Jan | Termometro Politico | 2,800 | 42.8 | 56.8 | 0.4 | 14.0 |
| 9–10 Jan | Quorum | 1,203 | 43.0 | 47.0 | 10.0 | 4.0 |
| 7–9 Jan | Termometro Politico | 2,600 | 42.9 | 56.5 | 0.6 | 13.6 |

=== 2024 ===
| Fieldwork date | Polling firm | Sample size | Approve | Disapprove | Don't know | Lead |
|---|---|---|---|---|---|---|
| 19–20 Dec | Tecnè | 998 | 40.2 | 52.3 | 7.5 | 12.1 |
| 18–20 Dec | Ipsos | 1,000 | 36.0 | 52.0 | 12.0 | 16.0 |
| 10–12 Dec | Termometro Politico | 2,800 | 41.7 | 58.1 | 0.2 | 16.4 |
| 3–5 Dec | Termometro Politico | 3,100 | 41.5 | 58.0 | 0.5 | 16.5 |
| 28–29 Nov | Tecnè | 1,000 | 40.8 | 51.7 | 7.5 | 10.9 |

== Giorgia Meloni approval rating ==
=== 2026 ===
| Fieldwork date | Polling firm | Sample size | Approve | Disapprove | Don't know | Lead |
|---|---|---|---|---|---|---|
| 10–11 Nov | BiDiMedia | 1,000 | 35.0 | 63.0 | 2.0 | 28.0 |
| 21–23 Oct | SWG | 800 | 41.0 | 59.0 | —N/a | 18.0 |
| 13–15 Sep | Termometro Politico | 2,400 | 39.0 | 60.5 | 0.5 | 21.5 |
| 21–24 Sep | Ipsos | 1,000 | 41.0 | 59.0 | —N/a | 19.0 |
| 4–6 Sep | BiDiMedia | 1,000 | 35.0 | 63.0 | 2.0 | 28.0 |

== Ministers approval rating ==
=== 2026 ===
| Date | Polling firm | Sample size | | | | | | | | | | | | | | | | Lead |
| Date | Polling firm | Sample size | Abodi | Bernini | Calderone | Crosetto | Giorgetti | Giuli | Lollobrigida | Mazzi | Musumeci | Pichetto Fratin | Salvini | Schillaci | Tajani | Urso | Zangrillo | Lead |
|---|---|---|---|---|---|---|---|---|---|---|---|---|---|---|---|---|---|---|
| 21–25 Sep | Lab21 | 1,012 | 50.1 | 50.7 | 52.9 | 50.4 | 50.4 | 49.6 | 50.3 | 50.5 | 50.1 | 50.8 | 50.6 | 50.6 | 49.8 | 50.6 | 50.4 | 2.1 |

=== 2025 ===
| Date | Polling firm | Sample size | | | | | | Lead |
| Date | Polling firm | Sample size | Crosetto | Giorgetti | Piantedosi | Pichetto Fratin | Tajani | Lead |
|---|---|---|---|---|---|---|---|---|
| 1–12 Dec | EMG Different | 2,000 | 29.0 | 28.3 | 28.5 | 28.5 | 32.8 | 3.8 |

== Party leaders approval rating ==
=== 2026 ===
| Date | Polling firm | Sample size | | | | | | | | | | | | | Lead |
| Date | Polling firm | Sample size | Meloni | Schlein | Conte | Salvini | Tajani | Calenda | Renzi | Bonelli | Fratoianni | Magi | Lupi | Vannacci | Lead |
|---|---|---|---|---|---|---|---|---|---|---|---|---|---|---|---|
| 2–9 Nov | Ixè | 1,000 | 39.0 | 24.0 | 30.0 | 18.0 | 27.0 | —N/a | —N/a | —N/a | —N/a | —N/a | —N/a | 16.0 | 9.0 |
| 26 Sep | Ipsos | — | 41.0 | 24.0 | 30.0 | 20.0 | 24.0 | 17.0 | 14.0 | 20.0 | 20.0 | 17.0 | 16.0 | 19.0 | 11.0 |

=== 2025 ===
| Date | Polling firm | Sample size | | | | | | | | | | | Lead |
| Date | Polling firm | Sample size | Meloni | Schlein | Conte | Salvini | Tajani | Calenda | Renzi | Bonelli | Fratoianni | Magi | Lead |
|---|---|---|---|---|---|---|---|---|---|---|---|---|---|
| 14–15 May | Tecnè | — | 46.5 | 29.4 | 30.3 | 26.6 | 39.7 | 19.8 | 13.9 | 16.1 | 16.0 | 16.8 | 6.8 |

| Date | Polling firm | Sample size | | | | | | | | | | | Lead |
| Date | Polling firm | Sample size | Meloni | Schlein | Conte | Salvini | Tajani | Calenda | Renzi | Bonelli | Fratoianni | Bonino | Lead |
|---|---|---|---|---|---|---|---|---|---|---|---|---|---|
| 7–8 May | Tecnè | 1,003 | 46.4 | 29.5 | 30.4 | 26.6 | 39.6 | 19.7 | 13.8 | 16.0 | 15.8 | 19.8 | 6.8 |
| 9–10 Apr | Tecnè | 1,000 | 46.1 | 30.2 | 30.1 | 26.5 | 39.4 | 19.1 | 14.3 | 15.9 | 15.4 | 20.2 | 6.7 |
| 23–24 Jan | Tecnè | 1,001 | 46.1 | 31.5 | 29.5 | 26.8 | 38.9 | 19.2 | 13.9 | 16.4 | 16.3 | 20.1 | 7.2 |

=== 2024 ===
| Date | Polling firm | Sample size | | | | | | | | | | | Lead |
| Date | Polling firm | Sample size | Meloni | Schlein | Conte | Salvini | Tajani | Calenda | Renzi | Bonelli | Fratoianni | Bonino | Lead |
|---|---|---|---|---|---|---|---|---|---|---|---|---|---|
| 19–20 Dec | Tecnè | 998 | 43.9 | 31.4 | 29.7 | 26.7 | 37.7 | 19.0 | 14.1 | 16.4 | 16.3 | 20.5 | 6.2 |
| 12–13 Dec | Tecnè | 1,000 | 43.8 | 31.3 | 29.6 | 26.5 | 37.7 | 18.8 | 14.2 | 16.4 | 16.4 | 20.4 | 6.1 |
| 28–29 Nov | Tecnè | 1,000 | 44.0 | 30.9 | 29.6 | 26.4 | 37.6 | 18.8 | 14.3 | 16.4 | 16.4 | 20.5 | 6.4 |

== Preferred Prime Minister ==
=== Meloni vs. Schlein ===
| Fieldwork date | Polling firm | Sample size | | |
| Fieldwork date | Polling firm | Sample size | Meloni | Schlein |
|---|---|---|---|---|
| 5 Oct 2026 | Piepoli | 519 | 56.0% | 44.0% |
| 27–30 Jul 2026 | Ipsos | 800 | 51.2% | 48.8% |
| 4–5 May 2026 | BiDiMedia | 1,000 | 52.3% | 47.7% |
| 27–28 Mar 2026 | BiDiMedia | 1,000 | 54.5% | 45.5% |
| 9 Jan 2026 | Quorum | —N/a | 53.6% | 46.4% |

=== Meloni vs. Conte ===
| Fieldwork date | Polling firm | Sample size | | |
| Fieldwork date | Polling firm | Sample size | Meloni | Conte |
|---|---|---|---|---|
| 5 Oct 2026 | Piepoli | 519 | 52.0% | 48.0% |
| 27–30 Jul 2026 | Ipsos | 800 | 49.0% | 51.0% |
| 27–28 Mar 2026 | BiDiMedia | 1,000 | 53.6% | 46.4% |
| 9 Jan 2026 | Quorum | —N/a | 50.1% | 49.9% |

=== Meloni vs. Salis ===
| Fieldwork date | Polling firm | Sample size | | |
| Fieldwork date | Polling firm | Sample size | Meloni | Salis |
|---|---|---|---|---|
| 27–28 Mar 2026 | BiDiMedia | 1,000 | 51.1% | 48.9% |
| 9 Jan 2026 | Quorum | —N/a | 51.8% | 48.2% |

=== Meloni vs. Decaro ===
| Fieldwork date | Polling firm | Sample size | | |
| Fieldwork date | Polling firm | Sample size | Meloni | Decaro |
|---|---|---|---|---|
| 9 Jan 2026 | Quorum | —N/a | 51.6% | 48.4% |

=== Meloni vs. Gentiloni ===
| Fieldwork date | Polling firm | Sample size | | |
| Fieldwork date | Polling firm | Sample size | Meloni | Gentiloni |
|---|---|---|---|---|
| 9 Jan 2026 | Quorum | —N/a | 52.8% | 47.2% |

=== Meloni vs. Gualtieri ===
| Fieldwork date | Polling firm | Sample size | | |
| Fieldwork date | Polling firm | Sample size | Meloni | Gualtieri |
|---|---|---|---|---|
| 5 Oct 2026 | Piepoli | 519 | 58.0% | 42.0% |

== Centre-left coalition primaries ==
=== Leadership election aggregations ===
Polling
| Polling aggregator | Ref. | Date updated | | | Lead |
| Polling aggregator | Ref. | Date updated | Schlein | Conte | Lead |
|---|---|---|---|---|---|
| Atlante elettorale | | 9 Sep 2026 | 50.5 | 49.5 | 1.0 |

=== Leadership election ===
| Fieldwork date | Polling firm | Sample size | | | | | | | | | | Others Don't know | Lead |
| Fieldwork date | Polling firm | Sample size | Schlein | Conte | Salis | Fratoianni | Bonelli | Renzi | Bersani | Decaro | Manfredi | Others Don't know | Lead |
|---|---|---|---|---|---|---|---|---|---|---|---|---|---|
| 19 Nov 2026 | Noto | – | 48.0 | 41.0 | —N/a | —N/a | —N/a | —N/a | —N/a | —N/a | —N/a | 11.0 | 7.0 |
| 11–15 Nov 2026 | Only Numbers | 1,000 (Note: The same poll asked whether respondents would still vote for the centre-left coalition if the primaries were won by a candidate from a different party than the one they support: 77.3% answered yes and 22.7% answered no.) | 33.5 | 34.9 | —N/a | —N/a | —N/a | —N/a | —N/a | —N/a | —N/a | 31.6 21.0 – Won't vote 10.6 – Don't know | 1.4 |
| 9–13 Nov | Sigma Piave | 800 (Note: The same poll asked whether the primaries should be a direct duel between Elly Schlein and Giuseppe Conte or open to other candidates: 56.0% answered open to other participants, 33.0% only Schlein and Conte, and 11.0% did not know.) | 43.0 | 40.0 | —N/a | —N/a | —N/a | —N/a | —N/a | —N/a | —N/a | 17.0 10.0 – Neither of them 7.0 – Don't know | 3.0 |
| 10–11 Nov 2026 | Eumetra | 800 | 49.6 | 50.4 | —N/a | —N/a | —N/a | —N/a | —N/a | —N/a | —N/a | —N/a | 0.8 |
| 5 Nov 2026 | Noto | – | 46.0 | 40.0 | —N/a | —N/a | —N/a | —N/a | —N/a | —N/a | —N/a | 14.0 | 6.0 |
| 16–22 Oct 2026 | Excellera Advisory Group | – | 26.2 | 46.5 | 16.2 | —N/a | —N/a | —N/a | —N/a | —N/a | —N/a | —N/a | 20.3 |
| 20 Oct 2026 | Noto | – | 49.0 | 46.0 | —N/a | —N/a | —N/a | —N/a | —N/a | —N/a | —N/a | 5.0 5.0 – Alessandro Onorato | 3.0 |
| 17–19 Oct 2026 | BiDiMedia | 1,000 | 52.7 | 47.3 | —N/a | —N/a | —N/a | —N/a | —N/a | —N/a | —N/a | —N/a | 5.4 |
| 17–19 Oct 2026 | BiDiMedia | 1,000 | 39.0 | 35.0 | —N/a | —N/a | —N/a | —N/a | —N/a | —N/a | —N/a | 26.0 26.0 – Another candidate | 4.0 |
| 17 Oct 2026 | Lab21 | – | 27.2 | 41.5 | —N/a | 2.9 | 4.2 | 11.1 | —N/a | —N/a | —N/a | 12.8 12.8 – Alessandro Onorato | 14.6 |
| 14–15 Oct 2026 | Only Numbers | 800 | 31.4 | 32.5 | —N/a | —N/a | —N/a | —N/a | —N/a | —N/a | —N/a | 36.1 23.0 – Won't vote 13.1 – Don't know/No answer | 1.1 |
| 13–14 Oct 2026 | Eumetra | 800 | 43.3 | 56.7 | —N/a | —N/a | —N/a | —N/a | —N/a | —N/a | —N/a | —N/a | 13.4 |
| 5–8 Oct 2026 | Sigma Piave | 800 | 38.0 | 42.0 | —N/a | —N/a | —N/a | —N/a | —N/a | —N/a | —N/a | 20.0 9.0 – Neither; 11.0 – Don't know | 4.0 |
| 6 Oct 2026 | Noto | (Note: Scenario among likely voters) | 51.0 | 44.0 | —N/a | —N/a | —N/a | —N/a | —N/a | —N/a | —N/a | 5.0 (Note: Generic civic candidate) | 7.0 |
| 29–30 Sep 2026 | Demopolis | (Note: Scenario among likely voters (1.5 million)) | 43.0 | 41.0 | —N/a | —N/a | —N/a | —N/a | —N/a | —N/a | —N/a | 16.0 | 2.0 |
| 29–30 Sep 2026 | Demopolis | (Note: Scenario among centre-left coalition voters (12 million)) | 40.0 | 44.0 | —N/a | —N/a | —N/a | —N/a | —N/a | —N/a | —N/a | 16.0 | 4.0 |
| 29–30 Sep 2026 | Demopolis | – | 26.0 | 33.0 | 20.0 | —N/a | —N/a | —N/a | —N/a | —N/a | —N/a | 21.0 5.0 – Alessandro Onorato and Ernesto Maria Ruffini; 16.0 – Don't know | 7.0 |
| 22–23 Sep 2026 | Eumetra | 800 | —N/a | —N/a | 21.2 | —N/a | —N/a | —N/a | 21.1 | 3.7 | 2.4 | 45.4 5.6 – Stefano Bonaccini; 4.9 – Roberto Gualtieri; 4.1 – Franco Gabrielli; 2.5 – Giorgio Gori; 2.5 – Giuseppe Sala; 2.2 – Ernesto Maria Ruffini; 29.8 – None of the above | 0.1 |
| 18–22 Sep 2026 | Quorum | (Note: High turnout scenario) | 30.9 | 27.2 | 17.3 | —N/a | —N/a | —N/a | —N/a | —N/a | —N/a | 24.6 | 3.7 |
| 18–22 Sep 2026 | Quorum | (Note: Low turnout scenario) | 38.6 | 22.3 | 20.7 | —N/a | —N/a | —N/a | —N/a | —N/a | —N/a | 18.4 | 16.3 |
| 16–18 Sep 2026 | Ipsos | – | 41.0 | 59.0 | —N/a | —N/a | —N/a | —N/a | —N/a | —N/a | —N/a | —N/a | 18.0 |
| 16–18 Sep 2026 | Ipsos | – | 22.0 | 38.0 | —N/a | —N/a | —N/a | —N/a | —N/a | —N/a | —N/a | 40.0 (Note: 20.0% for another candidate and 20.0% unsure, of which 4.0% would lean towards casting a blank or invalid ballot) | 16.0 |
| 14–18 Sep 2026 | Sigma Piave | – | 47.0 | 53.0 | —N/a | —N/a | —N/a | —N/a | —N/a | —N/a | —N/a | —N/a | 6.0 |
| 14–18 Sep 2026 | Sigma Piave | – | 32.0 | 42.0 | 21.0 | 5.0 | —N/a | —N/a | —N/a | —N/a | —N/a | —N/a | 10.0 |
| 14–18 Sep 2026 | Sigma Piave | – | 37.0 | 46.0 | —N/a | 5.0 | —N/a | 7.0 | —N/a | —N/a | —N/a | 5.0 4.0 – Matteo Hallissey; 1.0 – Alessandro Onorato | 9.0 |
| 15–16 Sep 2026 | Eumetra | – | 41.5 | 58.5 | —N/a | —N/a | —N/a | —N/a | —N/a | —N/a | —N/a | —N/a | 17.0 |
| 12 Sep 2026 | Noto | – | 56.0 | 44.0 | —N/a | —N/a | —N/a | —N/a | —N/a | —N/a | —N/a | —N/a | 12.0 |
| 12 Sep 2026 | Noto | – | 52.0 | 44.0 | —N/a | —N/a | —N/a | —N/a | —N/a | —N/a | —N/a | 4.0 | 8.0 |
| 2–10 Sep 2026 | Winpoll | – | 62.0 | 38.0 | —N/a | —N/a | —N/a | —N/a | —N/a | —N/a | —N/a | —N/a | 24.0 |
| 18 May 2026 | Demopolis | – | 44.0 | 40.0 | —N/a | —N/a | —N/a | —N/a | —N/a | —N/a | —N/a | 16.0 | 4.0 |
| 18 May 2026 | Demopolis | – | 32.0 | 35.0 | 20.0 | —N/a | —N/a | —N/a | —N/a | —N/a | —N/a | 13.0 | 3.0 |
| 4–5 May 2026 | BiDiMedia | – | 37.5 | 26.5 | 25.9 | —N/a | —N/a | —N/a | —N/a | —N/a | —N/a | 10.1 | 9.0 |
| 27–28 Apr 2026 | Only Numbers | – | 40.0 | 35.5 | —N/a | —N/a | —N/a | —N/a | —N/a | —N/a | —N/a | —N/a | 4.5 |
| 27–28 Apr 2026 | Only Numbers | – | 27.2 | 28.1 | —N/a | 2.4 | 3.5 | 5.8 | 15.6 | —N/a | —N/a | —N/a | 0.9 |
| 23 Apr 2026 | Only Numbers | – | 32.5 | 36.9 | —N/a | —N/a | —N/a | —N/a | —N/a | —N/a | —N/a | —N/a | 4.4 |
| 23 Apr 2026 | Only Numbers | – | 23.2 | 33.5 | —N/a | 0.8 | 3.6 | 6.2 | 13.0 | —N/a | —N/a | —N/a | 10.3 |
| 11–13 Apr 2026 | Quorum | – | 41.0 | 26.0 | 25.0 | 3.0 (Note: Generic Greens and Left Alliance candidate) | | —N/a | —N/a | —N/a | 1.0 | 4.0 (Note: Ernesto Maria Ruffini) | 15.0 |
| 11–13 Apr 2026 | Quorum | – | 36.0 | 26.0 | 29.0 | 5.0 | | —N/a | —N/a | —N/a | 1.0 | 3.0 | 10.0 |
| 27 Mar 2026 | Izi | – | 40.7 | 59.3 | —N/a | —N/a | —N/a | —N/a | —N/a | —N/a | —N/a | —N/a | 18.6 |
| 27 Mar 2026 | Izi | – | —N/a | 57.0 | 43.0 | —N/a | —N/a | —N/a | —N/a | —N/a | —N/a | —N/a | 14.0 |
| 27 Mar 2026 | Izi | – | 22.7 | 42.6 | 34.7 | —N/a | —N/a | —N/a | —N/a | —N/a | —N/a | —N/a | 7.9 |
| 27 Mar 2026 | Izi | – | 18.9 | 38.1 | 30.4 | 12.6 | | —N/a | —N/a | —N/a | —N/a | —N/a | 7.7 |
| 20–27 Mar 2026 | Winpoll | – | 61.0 | 39.0 | —N/a | —N/a | —N/a | —N/a | —N/a | —N/a | —N/a | —N/a | 22.0 |
| 4–5 Dec 2025 | Quorum | – | 31.0 | 29.0 | 28.0 | —N/a | —N/a | —N/a | —N/a | 9.0 | 3.0 | —N/a | 2.0 |
| 18–22 Nov 2025 | Quorum | – | 29.0 | 43.0 | 28.0 | —N/a | —N/a | —N/a | —N/a | —N/a | —N/a | —N/a | 14.0 |
| 6 Nov 2025 | BiDiMedia | 1,000 | 50.0 | —N/a | 50.0 | —N/a | —N/a | —N/a | —N/a | —N/a | —N/a | —N/a | 0.0 |
| 6 Nov 2025 | BiDiMedia | 1,000 | 58.0 | 42.0 | —N/a | —N/a | —N/a | —N/a | —N/a | —N/a | —N/a | —N/a | 16.0 |
| 6 Nov 2025 | BiDiMedia | 1,000 | —N/a | 44.0 | 56.0 | —N/a | —N/a | —N/a | —N/a | —N/a | —N/a | —N/a | 12.0 |
| 6 Nov 2025 | BiDiMedia | 1,000 | 27.0 | 30.0 | 31.0 | —N/a | —N/a | —N/a | —N/a | —N/a | 5.0 | 7.0 7.0 – Maurizio Landini | 1.0 |

Polling
| Fieldwork date | Polling firm | Sample size | Electorate | | Schlein | Conte | Won't vote | Don't know No answer | Others | Lead | | | | | | |
|---|---|---|---|---|---|---|---|---|---|---|---|---|---|---|---|---|
| Fieldwork date | Polling firm | Sample size | Electorate | | 19 Nov 2026 | Noto | – | CSX | | Lead | 48.0 | 41.0 | —N/a | —N/a | 11.0 | 7.0 |
| | PD | 87.0 | 6.0 | —N/a | 19 Nov 2026 | Noto | – | —N/a | 7.0 | 81.0 | | | | | | |
| | M5S | 2.0 | 98.0 | —N/a | 19 Nov 2026 | Noto | – | —N/a | 0.0 | 96.0 | | | | | | |
| | AVS | 50.0 | 38.0 | —N/a | 19 Nov 2026 | Noto | – | —N/a | 12.0 | 12.0 | | | | | | |
| | IV | —N/a | —N/a | —N/a | 19 Nov 2026 | Noto | – | —N/a | —N/a | —N/a | | | | | | |
| | +E | —N/a | —N/a | —N/a | 19 Nov 2026 | Noto | – | —N/a | —N/a | —N/a | | | | | | |
| 5 Nov 2026 | Noto | – | CSX | | 46.0 | 40.0 | —N/a | —N/a | 14.0 | 6.0 | | | | | | |
| 5 Nov 2026 | Noto | – | | PD | 84.0 | 11.0 | —N/a | —N/a | 5.0 | 73.0 | | | | | | |
| 5 Nov 2026 | Noto | – | | M5S | 2.0 | 91.0 | —N/a | —N/a | 7.0 | 84.0 | | | | | | |
| 5 Nov 2026 | Noto | – | | AVS | 72.0 | 15.0 | —N/a | —N/a | 13.0 | 57.0 | | | | | | |
| 5 Nov 2026 | Noto | – | | IV | 34.0 | 2.0 | —N/a | —N/a | 64.0 | 30.0 | | | | | | |
| 5 Nov 2026 | Noto | – | | +E | 34.0 | 12.0 | —N/a | —N/a | 54.0 | 20.0 | | | | | | |
| 20 Oct 2026 | Noto | – | CSX | | 49.0 | 46.0 | —N/a | —N/a | 5.0 5.0 – Alessandro Onorato | 3.0 | | | | | | |
| 20 Oct 2026 | Noto | – | | PD | 79.0 | 13.0 | —N/a | —N/a | 8.0 8.0 – Alessandro Onorato | 66.0 | | | | | | |
| 20 Oct 2026 | Noto | – | | M5S | 2.0 | 97.0 | —N/a | —N/a | 1.0 1.0 – Alessandro Onorato | 95.0 | | | | | | |
| 20 Oct 2026 | Noto | – | | AVS | 75.0 | 22.0 | —N/a | —N/a | 3.0 3.0 – Alessandro Onorato | 53.0 | | | | | | |
| 20 Oct 2026 | Noto | – | | IV | —N/a | —N/a | —N/a | —N/a | —N/a | —N/a | | | | | | |
| 20 Oct 2026 | Noto | – | | +E | —N/a | —N/a | —N/a | —N/a | —N/a | —N/a | | | | | | |
| 14–15 Oct 2026 | Only Numbers | 800 | CSX | | 31.4 | 32.5 | 23.0 | 13.1 | —N/a | 1.1 | | | | | | |
| 14–15 Oct 2026 | Only Numbers | 800 | | PD | 53.8 | 8.6 | 21.4 | 16.2 | —N/a | 45.2 | | | | | | |
| 14–15 Oct 2026 | Only Numbers | 800 | | M5S | 1.4 | 79.2 | 16.6 | 2.8 | —N/a | 77.8 | | | | | | |
| 14–15 Oct 2026 | Only Numbers | 800 | | AVS | 28.9 | 15.8 | 26.4 | 28.9 | —N/a | 13.1 | | | | | | |
| 14–15 Oct 2026 | Only Numbers | 800 | | IV | 17.4 | 34.8 | 43.5 | 4.3 | —N/a | 17.4 | | | | | | |
| 14–15 Oct 2026 | Only Numbers | 800 | | +E | —N/a | —N/a | —N/a | —N/a | —N/a | —N/a | | | | | | |

=== Under Schlein vs. Conte leadership ===
| Polling | | | | Parties | | | | | | | | | | | | | | | | Coalitions | | |
| Fieldwork date | Polling firm | Sample size | CSX leader | FdI | PD | M5S | Lega | FI | A | IV | AVS | +E | NM | SCN | PLD | Ora! | FN | Others | Lead | CSX | CDX | Lead |
|---|---|---|---|---|---|---|---|---|---|---|---|---|---|---|---|---|---|---|---|---|---|---|
| 19 Nov 2026 | Noto | – | Schlein | 28.0 | 21.0 | 10.0 | 6.5 | 6.6 | 3.5 | 2.8 | 6.5 | 1.0 | 1.6 | 1.0 | 0.4 | – | 6.2 | 5.2 1.3 – Civic Project Italy + Avanti – PSI; 0.5 – Plus One; 3.4 – Others | 7.0 | 43.1 | 45.2 | 2.1 |
| 19 Nov 2026 | Noto | – | Conte | 28.0 | 18.0 | 14.5 | 6.0 | 6.9 | 3.5 | 2.0 | 6.2 | 1.0 | 1.7 | 1.0 | 0.4 | – | 5.8 | 5.0 1.2 – Civic Project Italy + Avanti – PSI; 0.4 – Plus One; 3.4 – Others | 10.0 | 43.3 | 45.1 | 1.8 |
| 12 Nov 2026 | Only Numbers | 800 | Schlein | —N/a | —N/a | —N/a | —N/a | —N/a | 5.0 | —N/a | —N/a | —N/a | —N/a | —N/a | —N/a | —N/a | 8.0 | 3.0 | —N/a | 40.2 | 43.8 | 3.6 |
| 12 Nov 2026 | Only Numbers | 800 | Conte | —N/a | —N/a | —N/a | —N/a | —N/a | 5.1 | —N/a | —N/a | —N/a | —N/a | —N/a | —N/a | —N/a | 7.8 | 3.4 | —N/a | 41.0 | 42.7 | 1.7 |
| 2–9 Nov 2026 | Ixè | 1,000 | Schlein | 26.5 | 22.0 | 11.5 | 5.4 | 7.9 | 3.0 | 2.1 | 7.4 | – | – | – | – | – | 6.8 | 7.4 2.0 – Other parties of the centre-right coalition 1.6 – Other parties of the centre-left coalition 3.8 – Others | 4.5 | 44.6 | 41.8 | 2.8 |
| 2–9 Nov 2026 | Ixè | 1,000 | Conte | 25.7 | 19.5 | 15.3 | 4.9 | 8.6 | 2.4 | 2.6 | 7.6 | – | – | – | – | – | 5.6 | 7.8 1.5 – Other parties of the centre-right coalition 2.0 – Other parties of the centre-left coalition 4.3 – Others | 6.2 | 47.0 | 40.7 | 6.3 |
| 5 Nov 2026 | Noto | – | Schlein | 28.0 | 20.0 | 11.0 | 6.0 | 6.7 | 3.3 | 2.2 | 6.0 | 1.0 | 1.5 | 1.3 | 0.5 | – | 6.0 | 5.9 1.0 – Civic Project Italy + Avanti – PSI; 0.8 – Plus One; 4.1 – Others | 8.0 | 42.6 | 44.0 | 1.4 |
| 5 Nov 2026 | Noto | – | Conte | 28.5 | 18.7 | 14.0 | 6.0 | 7.0 | 3.8 | 1.9 | 6.0 | 1.0 | 1.5 | 1.2 | 0.5 | – | 5.5 | 4.6 1.3 – Civic Project Italy + Avanti – PSI; 1.0 – Plus One; 2.3 – Others | 9.8 | 43.7 | 44.7 | 1.0 |
| 26 Oct 2026 | Only Numbers | – | Schlein | 27.6 | 20.8 | 10.4 | 6.5 | 7.5 | 3.4 | 2.2 | 6.5 | 1.3 | 0.9 | 0.8 | – | – | 6.8 | 5.3 0.8 – Civic Project Italy; 0.5 – Plus One; 4.0 – Others | 6.8 | 42.5 | 43.3 | 0.8 |
| 26 Oct 2026 | Only Numbers | – | Conte | 28.0 | 18.7 | 12.0 | 6.3 | 7.6 | 4.0 | 1.9 | 6.2 | 1.8 | 1.0 | 1.0 | – | – | 6.5 | 5.0 1.0 – Civic Project Italy; 0.7 – Plus One; 3.3 – Others | 6.8 | 42.3 | 43.9 | 1.6 |
| 20 Oct 2026 | Noto | – | Schlein | 28.0 | 21.0 | 10.5 | 6.0 | 7.0 | 3.6 | 2.8 | 6.5 | 1.0 | 1.5 | 1.0 | 0.6 | – | 6.0 | 4.5 1.3 – Civic Project Italy + Avanti – PSI; 0.3 – Plus One; 2.9 – Others | 7.0 | 43.4 | 44.1 | 0.7 |
| 20 Oct 2026 | Noto | – | Conte | 28.0 | 19.3 | 13.5 | 6.0 | 7.0 | 4.0 | 2.2 | 6.5 | 1.0 | 1.5 | 1.0 | 0.6 | – | 5.7 | 4.3 1.1 – Civic Project Italy + Avanti – PSI; 0.3 – Plus One; 2.9 – Others | 7.0 | 43.9 | 44.1 | 0.2 |
| 14–19 Oct 2026 | SWG | 1,200 | Schlein | 29.7 | 21.2 | 11.8 | 5.1 | 7.2 | 3.1 | 2.4 | 6.4 | 1.3 | 1.0 | 1.0 | 1.3 | | 5.6 | 1.9 1.5 – Avanti – PSI, Civic Project Italy, and Plus One; 1.4 – Others | 8.5 | 44.6 | 44.0 | 0.6 |
| 14–19 Oct 2026 | SWG | 1,200 | Conte | 29.8 | 20.5 | 13.1 | 5.1 | 7.1 | 3.2 | 1.9 | 6.5 | 1.1 | 1.1 | 1.0 | 1.3 | | 5.4 | 2.7 1.4 – Avanti – PSI, Civic Project Italy, and Plus One; 1.3 – Others | 9.3 | 44.5 | 44.1 | 0.4 |
| 10 Oct 2026 | South calls North joins the centre-right coalition | | | | | | | | | | | | | | | | | | | | | |
| 28 Sep 2026 | Piepoli | 500 | Schlein | 27.5 | 20.5 | 12.5 | 5.0 | 7.5 | 3.0 | 2.0 | 7.0 | 1.0 | 1.5 | 1.5 | 1.5 | 0.5 | 7.5 | 1.5 | 7.0 | 43.0 | 41.5 | 1.5 |
| 28 Sep 2026 | Piepoli | 500 | Conte | 28.0 | 19.0 | 14.0 | 5.0 | 7.5 | 3.5 | 2.0 | 7.0 | 1.0 | 1.5 | 1.5 | 1.5 | 0.5 | 7.0 | 1.0 | 9.0 | 43.0 | 42.0 | 1.0 |

=== Most likely candidate to defeat Giorgia Meloni ===
| Date | Polling firm | Sample size | | | | | | | Others Don't know | Lead |
| Date | Polling firm | Sample size | Schlein | Conte | Salis | Fratoianni | Bonelli | Renzi | Others Don't know | Lead |
|---|---|---|---|---|---|---|---|---|---|---|
| 14 Sep 2026 | Only Numbers | 1,000 | 24.7 | 38.8 | 19.6 | 0.4 | 2.4 | 5.1 | 9.0 | 14.1 |

=== How to choose the candidate for Prime Minister ===
| Fieldwork date | Polling firm | Sample size | For primaries | Against primaries | Don't know No answer | Lead |
|---|---|---|---|---|---|---|
| 14–15 Oct 2026 | Only Numbers | 800 | 43.2 | 40.8 | 16.0 | 2.4 |

Polling
| Fieldwork date | Polling firm | Sample size | Electorate | | For primaries | Against primaries | Don't know No answer | Lead | | | | | |
|---|---|---|---|---|---|---|---|---|---|---|---|---|---|
| Fieldwork date | Polling firm | Sample size | Electorate | | 14–15 Oct 2026 | Only Numbers | 800 | Lead | CSX | 43.2 | 40.8 | 16.0 | 2.4 |
| | PD | 54.7 | 32.5 | 12.8 | 14–15 Oct 2026 | Only Numbers | 800 | 12.6 | | | | | |
| | M5S | 26.4 | 52.8 | 20.8 | 14–15 Oct 2026 | Only Numbers | 800 | 26.4 | | | | | |
| | AVS | 36.8 | 42.1 | 21.1 | 14–15 Oct 2026 | Only Numbers | 800 | 5.3 | | | | | |
| | IV | 47.8 | 43.5 | 8.7 | 14–15 Oct 2026 | Only Numbers | 800 | 4.3 | | | | | |

Polling
| Fieldwork date | Polling firm | Sample size | Primaries | Most-voted party's leader | Agreement between leaders | Don't know No answer | Lead | | | | | |
|---|---|---|---|---|---|---|---|---|---|---|---|---|
| Fieldwork date | Polling firm | Sample size | 6 Oct 2026 | Noto | – | Don't know No answer | Lead | 35.0 | 9.0 | 47.0 | 9.0 | 12.0 |
| 18–22 Sep 2026 | Quorum | 810 | 26.0 | 41.0 | 25.0 | 8.0 | 15.0 | | | | | |
| 15–16 Sep 2026 | Eumetra | – | 32.8 | – | 53.4 | 13.8 | 20.6 | | | | | |

Polling
| Fieldwork date | Polling firm | Sample size | Electorate | | Primaries | Most-voted party's leader | Agreement between leaders | Don't know No answer | Lead | | | | | |
|---|---|---|---|---|---|---|---|---|---|---|---|---|---|---|
| Fieldwork date | Polling firm | Sample size | Electorate | | 6 Oct 2026 | Noto | – | CSX | Lead | 35.0 | 9.0 | 47.0 | 9.0 | 12.0 |
| | PD | 25.0 | 12.0 | 55.0 | 6 Oct 2026 | Noto | – | 8.0 | 30.0 | | | | | |
| | M5S | 64.0 | 7.0 | 24.0 | 6 Oct 2026 | Noto | – | 5.0 | 40.0 | | | | | |
| | AVS | 35.0 | 15.0 | 44.0 | 6 Oct 2026 | Noto | – | 6.0 | 9.0 | | | | | |
| Centrists | | —N/a | —N/a | —N/a | 6 Oct 2026 | Noto | – | —N/a | —N/a | | | | | |
| 18–22 Sep 2026 | Quorum | 810 | CSX | | 26.0 | 41.0 | 25.0 | 8.0 | 15.0 | | | | | |
| 18–22 Sep 2026 | Quorum | 810 | | PD | 27.0 | 47.0 | 23.0 | 3.0 | 20.0 | | | | | |
| 18–22 Sep 2026 | Quorum | 810 | | M5S | 27.0 | 46.0 | 15.0 | 12.0 | 19.0 | | | | | |
| 18–22 Sep 2026 | Quorum | 810 | | AVS | 23.0 | 54.0 | 23.0 | – | 31.0 | | | | | |
| 18–22 Sep 2026 | Quorum | 810 | Centrists | | 19.0 | 26.0 | 37.0 | 18.0 | 11.0 | | | | | |

== Hypothetical polls ==
=== Polling by age ===
==== Polling among 18–24-year-olds ====
| Polling | | | Parties | | | | | | | | | | | | | | | | | Coalitions | |
| Fieldwork date | Polling firm | Sample size | FdI | PD | M5S | Lega | FI | A | PLD | Ora! | IV | AVS | +E | PaP | DSP | NM | FN | Others | Lead | CSX | CDX |
|---|---|---|---|---|---|---|---|---|---|---|---|---|---|---|---|---|---|---|---|---|---|
| 18–19 Jun 2026 | BiDiMedia | 1,000 | 17.0 | 20.0 | 9.5 | 4.0 | 9.0 | 5.0 | | 2.5 | 2.0 | 16.0 | 2.5 | 1.5 | 1.0 | 1.0 | 4.0 | 5.5 | 3.0 | 50.0 | 31.0 |
| 27–28 Mar 2026 | BiDiMedia | 1,000 | 19.0 | 22.0 | 7.0 | 5.0 | 8.0 | 9.0 | | | 2.0 | 16.0 | 3.0 | | 1.0 | 1.0 | 2.0 | 6.0 | 3.0 | 50.0 | 33.0 |
| 18–22 Sep 2025 | BiDiMedia | 1,000 | 20.0 | 27.0 | 9.0 | 4.0 | 9.0 | 6.0 | | 2.0 | 2.0 | 13.0 | 4.0 | 0.6 | 1.0 | 1.0 | | 2.0 | 7.0 | 55.0 | 34.0 |
| 25 Sep 2022 | Election results | – | 15.4 | 13.5 | 13.6 | 2.5 | 7.5 | 17.6 | | | 17.6 | 10.5 | 12.3 | 1.3 | | | | 5.8 | 2.2 | 37.6 | 26.7 |

==== Polling among 18–30-year-olds ====
| Polling | | | Parties | | | | | | | | | | | | | | | | | Coalitions | |
| Fieldwork date | Polling firm | Sample size | FdI | PD | M5S | Lega | FI | A | PLD | Ora! | IV | AVS | +E | PaP | DSP | NM | FN | Others | Lead | CSX | CDX |
|---|---|---|---|---|---|---|---|---|---|---|---|---|---|---|---|---|---|---|---|---|---|
| 21–23 Sep 2026 | Winpoll | 500 | 19.2 | 25.8 | 14.9 | 3.0 | 3.1 | 5.8 | | | 2.0 | 8.3 | 3.2 | 2.8 | | | 9.5 | – | 6.6 | 54.2 | 25.3 |

==== Polling among 18–34-year-olds ====
| Polling | | | Parties | | | | | | | | | | | | | | | | Coalitions | |
| Fieldwork date | Polling firm | Sample size | FdI | PD | M5S | Lega | FI | A | IV | AVS | +E | NM | ScN | PLD | PCI | FN | Others | Lead | CSX | CDX |
|---|---|---|---|---|---|---|---|---|---|---|---|---|---|---|---|---|---|---|---|---|
| 28 Oct – 4 Nov 2026 | Lab21 | – | 18.6 | 22.6 | 14.7 | 3.9 | 4.9 | 5.2 | 2.3 | 11.4 | 2.4 | 0.7 | 1.2 | 1.6 | 1.0 | 6.3 | 3.2 | 4.0 | 55.0 | 28.1 |

==== Polling among 25–34-year-olds ====
| Polling | | | Parties | | | | | | | | | | | | | | | | Coalitions | |
| Fieldwork date | Polling firm | Sample size | FdI | PD | M5S | Lega | FI | A | PLD | Ora! | IV | AVS | +E | PaP | NM | FN | Others | Lead | CSX | CDX |
|---|---|---|---|---|---|---|---|---|---|---|---|---|---|---|---|---|---|---|---|---|
| 18–19 Jun 2026 | BiDiMedia | 1,000 | 16.5 | 21.5 | 8.0 | 7.0 | 7.0 | 6.5 | 1.0 | 3.0 | 2.5 | 14.0 | 3.5 | 1.5 | 1.0 | 4.0 | 3.0 | 5.0 | 49.5 | 31.5 |
| 27–28 Mar 2026 | BiDiMedia | 1,000 | 19.0 | 22.0 | 11.0 | 5.0 | 11.0 | 9.0 | | | 2.0 | 12.0 | 3.0 | | 1.0 | 2.0 | 3.0 | 3.0 | 50.0 | 38.0 |
| 25 Sep 2022 | Election results | – | 23.1 | 15.7 | 20.2 | 8.9 | 7.8 | 9.1 | | | 9.1 | 4.9 | 6.2 | 0.7 | | | 2.8 | 2.9 | 27.1 | 40.5 |

==== Polling among 35–44-year-olds ====
| Polling | | | Parties | | | | | | | | | | | | | | | Coalitions | |
| Fieldwork date | Polling firm | Sample size | FdI | PD | M5S | Lega | FI | A | PLD | Ora! | IV | AVS | +E | NM | FN | Others | Lead | CSX | CDX |
|---|---|---|---|---|---|---|---|---|---|---|---|---|---|---|---|---|---|---|---|
| 27–28 Mar 2026 | BiDiMedia | 1,000 | 20.0 | 23.0 | 11.0 | 6.0 | 9.0 | 4.0 | | | 2.0 | 10.0 | 2.0 | 2.0 | 3.0 | 8.0 | 3.0 | 48.0 | 40.0 |
| 25 Sep 2022 | Election results | – | 24.0 | 16.6 | 21.4 | 10.5 | 7.2 | 4.2 | | | 4.2 | 3.9 | 2.0 | 1.1 | | 8.9 | 7.4 | 23.4 | 42.8 |

==== Polling among 45–54-year-olds ====
| Polling | | | Parties | | | | | | | | | | | | | | | Coalitions | |
| Fieldwork date | Polling firm | Sample size | FdI | PD | M5S | Lega | FI | A | PLD | Ora! | IV | AVS | +E | NM | FN | Others | Lead | CSX | CDX |
|---|---|---|---|---|---|---|---|---|---|---|---|---|---|---|---|---|---|---|---|
| 27–28 Mar 2026 | BiDiMedia | 1,000 | 30.0 | 19.0 | 14.0 | 8.0 | 8.0 | 2.0 | | | 2.0 | 6.0 | 1.0 | 1.0 | 4.0 | 5.0 | 11.0 | 42.0 | 51.0 |
| 25 Sep 2022 | Election results | – | 29.8 | 15.1 | 17.8 | 10.2 | 8.5 | 4.2 | | | 4.2 | 3.0 | 1.2 | 0.9 | | 9.3 | 12.0 | 19.7 | 49.4 |

==== Polling among 55–64-year-olds ====
| Polling | | | Parties | | | | | | | | | | | | | | | Coalitions | |
| Fieldwork date | Polling firm | Sample size | FdI | PD | M5S | Lega | FI | A | PLD | Ora! | IV | AVS | +E | NM | FN | Others | Lead | CSX | CDX |
|---|---|---|---|---|---|---|---|---|---|---|---|---|---|---|---|---|---|---|---|
| 27–28 Mar 2026 | BiDiMedia | 1,000 | 32.0 | 20.0 | 18.0 | 7.0 | 5.0 | 2.0 | | | 2.0 | 4.0 | | 1.0 | 5.0 | 4.0 | 12.0 | 44.0 | 50.0 |
| 25 Sep 2022 | Election results | – | 31.7 | 19.4 | 15.2 | 9.1 | 5.3 | 6.3 | | | 6.3 | 2.5 | 2.0 | 0.6 | | 7.9 | 12.3 | 24.2 | 46.7 |

==== Polling among over 65-year-olds ====
| Polling | | | Parties | | | | | | | | | | | | | | | Coalitions | |
| Fieldwork date | Polling firm | Sample size | FdI | PD | M5S | Lega | FI | A | PLD | Ora! | IV | AVS | +E | NM | FN | Others | Lead | CSX | CDX |
|---|---|---|---|---|---|---|---|---|---|---|---|---|---|---|---|---|---|---|---|
| 27–28 Mar 2026 | BiDiMedia | 1,000 | 34.0 | 25.0 | 12.0 | 6.0 | 6.0 | 2.0 | | | 3.0 | 4.0 | | 1.0 | 2.0 | 5.0 | 9.0 | 44.0 | 49.0 |
| 25 Sep 2022 | Election results | – | 24.4 | 26.3 | 8.2 | 7.8 | 10.5 | 10.8 | | | 10.8 | 2.6 | 1.3 | 1.0 | | 7.1 | 1.9 | 30.8 | 43.7 |

=== Polling with parties of different years ===
==== Historical parties ====
In February 2025, BiDiMedia released a poll asking respondents how they would vote if political parties from different periods of Italian history were present in contemporary Italy. The scenarios concerned the parties that contested the 1921 Italian general election, the 1983 Italian general election, and the 2001 Italian general election. In the first scenario, referring to the political parties of 1921, the Communist Party of Italy (PCd'I) received 20.2%, followed by the Italian Socialist Party (PSI) at 19.7%, the Italian People's Party (PPI) at 15.8%, Liberals (L) at 14.5%, and the National Bloc (BN) at 13.1%, despite the latter including Benito Mussolini and Italian fascists. The Italian Republican Party (PRI) received 9.9%, while the Italian Democratic Liberal Party (PLDI), the Reformist Democratic Party (Italy) (PRD), and Social Democracy (DS) respectively received 4.2%, 1.4%, and 1.2%. According to this hypotetical vote, the parties supporting the governments formed after the election (PPI, L, BN, PLDI, DS, and PRD) would together account for 50.2%, compared with approximately 63.9% for the corresponding parties in the real election. Taken together, the left-wing bloc of the PCd'I and PSI accounted for 39.9% of the hypothetical vote. A broader left-wing bloc including the PPI would reach 55.7%, while the PCd'I, PSI, and PRI together would account for 49.8%. On the right, L and BN together accounted for 27.6%, rising to 43.4% if the PPI is included.

In the second scenario, referring to the political parties of 1983, the Italian Communist Party (PCI) received 22.2%, followed by Christian Democracy (DC) at 20.8%, the Italian Social Movement (MSI) at 18.3%, and the PSI at 12.8%. The Italian Liberal Party (PLI) received 8.8%, followed by the PRI at 5.0%, the Radical Party (PR) at 4.7%, Proletarian Democracy (DP) at 3.4%, and the Italian Democratic Socialist Party (PSDI) at 2.7%. Regionalist parties, such as the South Tyrolean People's Party (SVP), the Valdostan Union (UV), the Sardinian Action Party (PSd'Az), and the List for Trieste (LpT), totalled 1.4%. The five parties that formed the Pentapartito government—DC, PSI, PSDI, PRI, and PLI—would together account for 50.1% of the hypothetical vote, compared with 56.4% in the 1983 election. Taken together, the left-wing bloc of the PCI, PSI, DP, and PdUP accounted for 41.8% of the hypothetical vote, rising to 46.5% if the PR is included. The centrist bloc of the DC, PRI, PLI, and PSDI accounted for 37.3%, while the MSI alone received 18.3%. The distribution also differed from BiDiMedia's 2019 poll using the parties of 1983, which was topped by the far-right MSI, as the PCI increased from 18.9% to 22.2%, the DC from 17.4% to 20.8%, and the PSI from 12.5% to 12.8%, while the MSI declined from 19.6% to 18.3%. The PR fell from 7.0% to 4.7%, whereas the PLI increased from 6.0% to 8.8%.

In the third scenario, referring to the political parties of 2001, Forza Italia (FI) received 23.5%, followed by the Democrats of the Left (DS) at 22.3% and National Alliance (AN) at 15.0%. Democracy is Freedom – The Daisy (DL) and the Northern League (LN) each received 7.5%, followed by the Communist Refoundation Party (PRC) at 6.4%, Italy of Values (IdV) at 5.4%, The Sunflower (IG) at 3.4%, and the Bonino List (LB) at 3.0%. The Party of Italian Communists (PdCI) received 1.7%, while the White Flower (CCD–CDU) and the European Democrats (DE) respectively received 1.3% and 0.8%. The 2001 scenario differs from the other two because the parties were originally organised into established electoral coalitions. Unlike the other two scenarios, applying the 2001 coalition groupings to the BiDiMedia 2025 hypothetical vote generally matched the real-election result. The centre-right coalition, then known as the House of Freedoms and represented by FI, AN, LN, and CCD–CDU, would together account for 47.3% (compared to the 49.6% of the real election) while the centre-left coalition, then under the Olive Tree name and represented by the DS, DL, IG, and the PdCI, would account for 34.9% (compared to the 35.0% of the real election). Including the PRC, which was not formally part of the Olive Tree but did not field candidates in the first-past-the-post constituencies for the Chamber of Deputies under a non-belligerence agreement with the Olive Tree, the centre-left coalition would account for 41.3% (compared to 40.0% when the PRC's 5.0% is added to the real-election result).

===== 1921 =====
| Polling | | | Parties | | | | | | | | | |
| Fieldwork date | Polling firm | Sample size | PCd'I | PSI | PPI | L | BN | PRI | PLDI | PRD | DS | Lead |
|---|---|---|---|---|---|---|---|---|---|---|---|---|
| 17–20 Feb 2025 | BiDiMedia | 1,200 | 20.2 | 19.7 | 15.8 | 14.5 | 13.1 | 9.9 | 4.2 | 1.4 | 1.2 | 0.5 |
| 15 May 1921 | Election results | – | 4.6 | 24.7 | 20.4 | 7.1 | 19.0 | 1.9 | 10.4 | 1.9 | 4.7 | 4.3 |

===== 1983 =====
| Polling | | | Parties | | | | | | | | | | |
| Fieldwork date | Polling firm | Sample size | PCI | DC | MSI | PSI | PLI | PRI | PR | DP | PSDI | SVP UV PSd'Az LpT | Lead |
|---|---|---|---|---|---|---|---|---|---|---|---|---|---|
| 17–20 Feb 2025 | BiDiMedia | 1,200 | 22.2 | 20.8 | 18.3 | 12.8 | 8.8 | 5.0 | 4.7 | 3.4 | 2.7 | 1.4 | 1.4 |
| 26 June 1983 | Election results | – | 29.9 | 33.0 | 6.9 | 11.5 | 2.9 | 5.1 | 2.2 | 1.5 | 4.1 | 1.1 | 3.1 |

===== 2001 =====
| Polling | | | Parties | | | | | | | | | | | | |
| Fieldwork date | Polling firm | Sample size | FI | DS | AN | DL | LN | PRC | IdV | IG | LB | PdCI | CCD CDU | DE | Lead |
|---|---|---|---|---|---|---|---|---|---|---|---|---|---|---|---|
| 17–20 Feb 2025 | BiDiMedia | 1,200 | 23.5 | 22.3 | 15.0 | 7.5 | 7.5 | 6.4 | 5.4 | 3.4 | 3.0 | 1.7 | 1.3 | 0.8 | 1.2 |
| 13 May 2001 | Election results | – | 29.5 | 16.6 | 12.0 | 14.6 | 4.0 | 5.0 | 3.9 | 2.2 | 2.2 | 1.7 | 3.2 | 2.4 | 12.9 |

==== First Republic parties ====
A May 2026 poll, conducted by Quorum/YouTrend for Sky TG24 on the occasion of the 80th anniversary of the 2 June 1946 institutional referendum, reported several questions concerning Italy's political past and constitutional system. Among respondents who would vote in a hypothetical repetition of the 1946 referendum, 85% would choose the republic and 15% the monarchy. On the Italian Constitution, 69% considered it still current: 27% regarded it as fully up to date and not in need of changes, while 42% considered it broadly current but in need of minor amendments; 22% instead considered it partly or entirely outdated, and 9% did not express an opinion. A separate question on the election of a new Constituent Assembly to rewrite the Constitution found 45% in favour, 42% opposed, and 13% undecided. The poll also found that anti-fascism was considered the element that had most united Italians over the previous 80 years by 59% of centre-left coalition voters, compared with 18% of centre-right coalition voters.

The same poll asked respondents which parties of the First Italian Republic they would vote for. The Italian Communist Party (PCI) received 25.4%, ahead of Christian Democracy (DC) at 20.1% and the Italian Social Movement (MSI) at 14.3%, followed by the Italian Socialist Party (PSI) at 11.9%, the Italian Liberal Party (PLI) at 9.5%, the Radical Party (PR) at 6.6%, the Italian Democratic Socialist Party (PSDI) at 5.4%, and Proletarian Democracy (DP) at 3.0%. The preferences largely reflected modern party affiliations: the PCI received particularly strong support among AVS, M5S, and PD voters, while the MSI attracted substantial support among FdI voters. Specifically, 68% of AVS voters, 39% of M5S voters, and 37% of PD voters said they would vote for the PCI, while 43% of FdI voters said they would vote for the MSI; among PD voters, 20% would vote for the DC and another 20% for the PSI.

| Polling | | | Parties | | | | | | | | | |
| Fieldwork date | Polling firm | Sample size | PCI | DC | MSI | PSI | PLI | PR | PRI | PSDI | DP | Lead |
|---|---|---|---|---|---|---|---|---|---|---|---|---|
| 26–27 May 2026 | Quorum | 815 | 25.4 | 20.1 | 14.3 | 11.9 | 9.5 | 6.6 | 5.4 | 3.8 | 3.0 | 5.3 |

==== First Republic politicians ====
A March 2025 poll, conducted by BiDiMedia, asked respondents which politician of the First Republic they appreciated the most and who they would vote for Prime Minister. Enrico Berlinguer of the PCI received 31.2%, followed by Aldo Moro of the DC with 26.9%, Bettino Craxi of the PSI with 18.6%, Giorgio Almirante of the MSI with 15.9%, and Giulio Andreotti of the DC with 7.1%.

| Polling | | | Politicians | | | | | | | | |
| Fieldwork date | Polling firm | Sample size | Berlinguer | Moro | Craxi | Almirante | Andreotti | Lead | | | |
|---|---|---|---|---|---|---|---|---|---|---|---|
| Fieldwork date | Polling firm | Sample size | 17–19 Mar 2025 | BiDiMedia | 1,200 | 31.2 | 26.9 | 18.6 | 15.9 | 7.1 | 4.3 |

=== Polling by football team supported ===
A September 2026 poll by BiDiMedia among voters—not including those under 18—found Juventus first with 16%, Inter Milan second with 12%, Milan third with 11%, Napoli fourth with 7%, Roma fifth with 5%, and Fiorentina, Torino, and Lazio tied for sixth with 2%, while other clubs accounted for 11% and those supporting no team for 32%. Politically, voters supporting Juventus were relatively split across the political spectrum, slightly more leaning towards the centre-right coalition parties but favouring moderates, while those supporting Inter and Milan in particular were more right-leaning, with above-average results for FN. Supporters of Napoli and Roma, particularly those of Napoli, were more favourable to the centre-left coalition parties.

In line with historical research, Juventus attracted support across the country, making it the most supported club in Northern Italy and respectively the second behind Roma and Napoli in Central Italy and Southern Italy, more so than Inter and Milan, the only other clubs with a similarly national distribution. Napoli drew most of its support from Campania and Southern Italy, while Roma drew most of its support from the Lazio region and Central Italy. For other clubs, such as Lazio, the sample was not large enough to provide results as reliable or robust as those for the other clubs; however, in line with other research, the available results showed a strong right-leaning tendency.

| Polling | | | | Parties | | | | | | | | | |
| Fieldwork date | Polling firm | Sample size | Tifosi | FdI | PD | M5S | Lega | FI | FN | AVS | Centre | Abstention | Lead |
|---|---|---|---|---|---|---|---|---|---|---|---|---|---|
| 4–6 Sep 2026 | BiDiMedia | 1,000 | Juventus | 17 | 14 | 8 | 3 | 9 | 4 | 3 | 3 | 39 | 22 |
| 4–6 Sep 2026 | BiDiMedia | 1,000 | Inter | 15 | 14 | 7 | 8 | 6 | 8 | 4 | 5 | 33 | 18 |
| 4–6 Sep 2026 | BiDiMedia | 1,000 | Milan | 21 | 10 | 5 | 7 | 6 | 6 | 4 | 4 | 37 | 16 |
| 4–6 Sep 2026 | BiDiMedia | 1,000 | Napoli | 14 | 15 | 14 | 3 | 3 | – | 4 | 8 | 39 | 24 |
| 4–6 Sep 2026 | BiDiMedia | 1,000 | Roma | 18 | 19 | 6 | 3 | 5 | 5 | 5 | 4 | 35 | 16 |

| Polling | | | | Parties | | | | | | | | | Coalitions | | | |
| Fieldwork date | Polling firm | Sample size | Tifosi | FdI | PD | M5S | Lega | FI | FN | AVS | Centre | Lead | Left | Right | Centre | Lead |
|---|---|---|---|---|---|---|---|---|---|---|---|---|---|---|---|---|
| 4–6 Sep 2026 | BiDiMedia | 1,000 | Juventus | 27.9 | 23.0 | 13.1 | 4.9 | 14.8 | 6.6 | 4.9 | 4.9 | 4.9 | 41.0 | 39.4 | 19.7 | 1.6 |
| 4–6 Sep 2026 | BiDiMedia | 1,000 | Inter | 22.4 | 20.9 | 10.4 | 11.9 | 9.0 | 11.9 | 6.0 | 7.5 | 1.5 | 38.8 | 46.2 | 16.5 | 7.4 |
| 4–6 Sep 2026 | BiDiMedia | 1,000 | Milan | 33.3 | 15.9 | 7.9 | 11.1 | 9.5 | 9.5 | 6.3 | 6.3 | 17.4 | 30.1 | 53.9 | 15.8 | 23.8 |
| 4–6 Sep 2026 | BiDiMedia | 1,000 | Napoli | 23.0 | 24.6 | 23.0 | 4.9 | 4.9 | – | 6.6 | 13.1 | 1.6 | 54.2 | 27.9 | 18.0 | 26.3 |
| 4–6 Sep 2026 | BiDiMedia | 1,000 | Roma | 27.7 | 29.2 | 9.2 | 4.6 | 7.7 | 7.7 | 7.7 | 6.2 | 1.5 | 44.6 | 40.0 | 15.4 | 4.6 |

=== Polling for coalitions ===
==== CSX vs. CDX vs. FN vs. Centre ====
| Polling | | | Coalitions | | | | |
| Fieldwork date | Polling firm | Sample size | CSX | CDX | FN | Centre | Lead |
|---|---|---|---|---|---|---|---|
| 17–19 Oct 2026 | BiDiMedia | 1,000 | 44.6 | 42.9 | 5.7 | 3.6 | 1.7 |
| 18–19 Jun 2026 | BiDiMedia | 1,000 | 44.6 | 44.4 | 4.8 | 5.7 | 0.2 |
| 25–27 May 2026 | BiDiMedia | 1,000 | 45.6 | 45.1 | 4.3 | 5.0 | 0.5 |

==== CSX (with IV) vs. CDX (without FN) ====
| Polling | | | Coalitions | | |
| Fieldwork date | Polling firm | Sample size | CSX | CDX | Lead |
|---|---|---|---|---|---|
| 16–22 Oct 2026 | Excellera Advisory Group | – | 45.2 | 40.5 | 4.7 |

==== CSX (with IV) vs. CDX (with FN) ====
| Polling | | | Coalitions | | |
| Fieldwork date | Polling firm | Sample size | CSX | CDX | Lead |
|---|---|---|---|---|---|
| 16–22 Oct 2026 | Excellera Advisory Group | – | 45.2 | 48.2 | 3.0 |

==== CSX (without IV) vs. CDX (without FN) ====
| Polling | | | Coalitions | | |
| Fieldwork date | Polling firm | Sample size | CSX | CDX | Lead |
|---|---|---|---|---|---|
| 16–22 Oct 2026 | Excellera Advisory Group | – | 41.9 | 40.5 | 1.4 |

==== CSX (with two joint centrist lists) vs. CDX (with ScN) ====
| Polling | | | Coalitions | | |
| Fieldwork date | Polling firm | Sample size | CSX | CDX | Lead |
|---|---|---|---|---|---|
| 14–26 Oct 2026 | Ipsos | 1,300 | 45.2 | 41.2 | 4.0 |

==== CSX vs. CDX (with ScN-PLD) ====
| Polling | | | Coalitions | | |
| Fieldwork date | Polling firm | Sample size | CSX | CDX | Lead |
|---|---|---|---|---|---|
| 16–17 Nov 2026 | EMG | 1,000 | 43.3 | 45.7 | 2.4 |
| 16 Nov 2026 | Pieopoli | 500 | 43.0 | 45.0 | 2.0 |

==== CSX vs. CDX (with FN-ScN-PLD) ====
| Polling | | | Coalitions | | |
| Fieldwork date | Polling firm | Sample size | CSX | CDX | Lead |
|---|---|---|---|---|---|
| 16 Nov 2026 | Pieopoli | 500 | 43.5 | 48.0 | 4.5 |

==== CSX vs. CDX vs. FN vs. A–+E ====
| Polling | | | Coalitions | | | | | |
| Fieldwork date | Polling firm | Sample size | CSX | CDX | FN | Centre | Other | Lead |
|---|---|---|---|---|---|---|---|---|
| 15–16 Sep 2026 | Eumetra | 800 | 41.9 | 40.7 | 7.7 | 4.6 | 5.1 | 1.2 |

==== CSX (Schlein leader) vs. CDX (Meloni leader) vs. FN (Vannacci leader) vs. Centre (Calenda leader) ====
| Polling | | | Coalitions | | | | |
| Fieldwork date | Polling firm | Sample size | CSX | CDX | FN | Centre | Lead |
|---|---|---|---|---|---|---|---|
| 17–19 Oct 2026 | BiDiMedia | 1,000 | 43.8 | 45.2 | 6.3 | 4.7 | 1.4 |
| 14–19 Oct 2026 | SWG | 1,200 | 44.6 | 44.0 | 5.6 | 4.4 | 0.6 |
| 28 Sep 2026 | Piepoli | 500 | 43.0 | 41.5 | 7.5 | 5.0 | 1.5 |
| 18–19 Jun 2026 | BiDiMedia | 1,000 | 42.9 | 45.6 | 5.2 | 6.3 | 2.7 |

==== CSX (Conte leader) vs. CDX (Meloni leader) vs. FN (Vannacci leader) vs. Centre (Calenda leader) ====
| Polling | | | Coalitions | | | | |
| Fieldwork date | Polling firm | Sample size | CSX | CDX | FN | Centre | Lead |
|---|---|---|---|---|---|---|---|
| 14–19 Oct 2026 | SWG | 1,200 | 44.5 | 44.1 | 5.4 | 4.7 | 0.4 |
| 28 Sep 2026 | Piepoli | 500 | 43.0 | 42.0 | 7.0 | 5.5 | 1.0 |
| 18–19 Jun 2026 | BiDiMedia | 1,000 | 41.5 | 45.9 | 5.3 | 7.3 | 4.4 |

==== CSX vs. CDX+FN vs. Centre ====
| Polling | | | Coalitions | | | |
| Fieldwork date | Polling firm | Sample size | CSX | CDX | Centre | Lead |
|---|---|---|---|---|---|---|
| 17–19 Oct 2026 | BiDiMedia | 1,000 | 45.2 | 45.2 | 5.1 | 0.0 |
| 18–19 Jun 2026 | BiDiMedia | 1,000 | 46.7 | 46.5 | 6.8 | 0.2 |
| 25–27 May 2026 | BiDiMedia | 1,000 | 46.6 | 47.1 | 6.3 | 0.5 |

==== CSX vs. CDX+A vs. FN ====
| Polling | | | Coalitions | | | |
| Fieldwork date | Polling firm | Sample size | CSX | CDX | FN | Lead |
|---|---|---|---|---|---|---|
| 25–27 May 2026 | BiDiMedia | 1,000 | 47.7 | 46.2 | 6.1 | 1.5 |

==== CSX vs. CDX+PLD vs. FN vs. A ====
| Polling | | | Coalitions | | | | |
| Fieldwork date | Polling firm | Sample size | CSX | CDX | FN | A | Lead |
|---|---|---|---|---|---|---|---|
| 17–19 Oct 2026 | BiDiMedia | 1,000 | 44.4 | 43.5 | 5.6 | 2.9 | 0.9 |

==== CSX vs. CDX+A+FN ====
| Polling | | | Coalitions | | |
| Fieldwork date | Polling firm | Sample size | CSX | CDX | Lead |
|---|---|---|---|---|---|
| 25–27 May 2026 | BiDiMedia | 1,000 | 51.3 | 48.7 | 2.6 |

==== CSX+PSI-PCI vs. CDX+UDC vs. FN vs. A–PLD ====
| Polling | | | Coalitions | | | | | |
| Fieldwork date | Polling firm | Sample size | CSX | CDX | FN | A–PLD | Others | Lead |
|---|---|---|---|---|---|---|---|---|
| 4–6 Sep 2026 | BiDiMedia | 1,000 | 44.2 | 41.1 | 7.0 | 4.3 | 3.4 | 2.9 |
| 4–6 Jul 2026 | BiDiMedia | 1,000 | 43.9 | 42.2 | 6.0 | 4.2 | 3.7 | 1.7 |

==== CSX+PSI-PCI vs. CDX+UDC-FN vs. A–PLD ====
| Polling | | | Coalitions | | | | |
| Fieldwork date | Polling firm | Sample size | CSX | CDX | A–PLD | Others | Lead |
|---|---|---|---|---|---|---|---|
| 4–6 Jul 2026 | BiDiMedia | 1,000 | 45.5 | 44.5 | 6.2 | 3.8 | 1.0 |

==== Left vs. Right vs. Centre ====
| Polling | | | Coalitions | | | | |
| Fieldwork date | Polling firm | Sample size | Left | Right | Centre | Others | Lead |
|---|---|---|---|---|---|---|---|
| 4–6 Jul 2026 | BiDiMedia | 1,000 | 41.8 | 39.7 | 16.3 | 2.2 | 2.1 |

==== Who should be part of the centre-left coalition ====
Polling
| Fieldwork date | Polling firm | Sample size | Electorate | Party | | | | | | | |
| Fieldwork date | Polling firm | Sample size | Electorate | PD | M5S | AVS | A | IV | +E | PSI–PCI | Other |
|---|---|---|---|---|---|---|---|---|---|---|---|
| 18–22 Sep 2026 | Quorum | 810 | CSX voters | 78.0 | 67.0 | 71.0 | 30.0 | 39.0 | 57.0 | – | 61.0 36.0 – Liberal Democratic Party; 25.0 – Ora! |
| 18–22 Sep 2026 | Quorum | 810 | PD | 93.0 | 70.0 | 75.0 | 37.0 | 45.0 | 68.0 | – | 74.0 47.0 – Liberal Democratic Party; 27.0 – Ora! |
| 18–22 Sep 2026 | Quorum | 810 | M5S | 59.0 | 97.0 | 67.0 | 18.0 | 32.0 | 39.0 | – | 63.0 41.0 – Liberal Democratic Party; 22.0 – Ora! |
| 18–22 Sep 2026 | Quorum | 810 | AVS | 68.0 | 64.0 | 74.0 | 15.0 | 11.0 | 52.0 | – | 24.0 15.0 – Liberal Democratic Party; 9.0 – Ora! |
| 18–22 Sep 2026 | Quorum | 810 | Centrists | 73.0 | 34.0 | 67.0 | 15.0 | 47.0 | 56.0 | – | 52.0 32.0 – Ora! 20.0 – Liberal Democratic Party |
| 16–18 Sep 2026 | Ipsos | – | CSX voters | 81.0 | 73.0 | 76.0 | 44.0 | 47.0 | 68.0 | 54.0 | 50.0 (Note: Single electoral list comprising Plus One, Primavera, and Democratic Centre) |
| 16–18 Sep 2026 | Ipsos | – | PD | 93.0 | 76.0 | 83.0 | 46.0 | 59.0 | 75.0 | 64.0 | 58.0 |
| 16–18 Sep 2026 | Ipsos | – | M5S | 72.0 | 87.0 | 66.0 | 30.0 | 33.0 | 50.0 | 48.0 | 45.0 |
| 16–18 Sep 2026 | Ipsos | – | AVS | 78.0 | 83.0 | 93.0 | 44.0 | 36.0 | 79.0 | 55.0 | 43.0 |
| 16–18 Sep 2026 | Ipsos | – | Other lists | 74.0 | 49.0 | 67.0 | 61.0 | 57.0 | 69.0 | 50.0 | 58.0 |
| 16–18 Sep 2026 | Ipsos | – | Don't know | 77.0 | 67.0 | 72.0 | 45.0 | 43.0 | 66.0 | 50.0 | 44.0 |

===== Acceptance of Matteo Renzi =====
Polling
| Fieldwork date | Polling firm | Sample size | Yes | No | Don't know No answer | Lead |
|---|---|---|---|---|---|---|
| 14–15 Oct 2026 | Only Numbers | 800 | 47.3 | 30.9 | 21.8 | 16.4 |
| 6 Oct 2026 | Noto | (Note: The same poll asked voters of the centre-left coalition how the involvement of Matteo Renzi would influence their vote. According to the results, 78% of Democratic Party (PD) voters, 58% of Five Star Movement (M5S) voters, and 58% of Greens and Left Alliance (AVS) voters would support their respective parties regardless of Renzi's presence. 31% of M5S and 28% of AVS voters stated they would only vote for their party if Renzi were excluded from the coalition, compared to 9% of PD voters. Conversely, 9% of PD, 3% of M5S, and 1% of AVS voters would only vote for their party if Renzi were included, while those undecided stood at 4% for PD, 8% for M5S, and 13% for AVS.) | 33.0 | 42.0 | 25.0 | 9.0 |
| 28 Sep 2026 | Only Numbers | 1.000 | 48.3 | 29.1 | 22.6 | 19.2 |
| 18–22 Sep 2026 | Quorum | 810 | 39.0 | 61.0 | – | 22.0 |
| 14 Sep 2026 | Only Numbers | 1,000 | 51.8 | 31.4 | 16.8 | 20.4 |

Polling
| Fieldwork date | Polling firm | Sample size | Electorate | Yes | No | Don't know No answer | Lead |
|---|---|---|---|---|---|---|---|
| 14–15 Oct 2026 | Only Numbers | 800 | | | | | |
| 14–15 Oct 2026 | Only Numbers | 800 | PD | 60.7 | 20.5 | 18.8 | 40.2 |
| 14–15 Oct 2026 | Only Numbers | 800 | M5S | 9.7 | 58.3 | 32.0 | 48.6 |
| 14–15 Oct 2026 | Only Numbers | 800 | AVS | 44.7 | 28.9 | 26.4 | 15.8 |
| 14–15 Oct 2026 | Only Numbers | 800 | IV | 95.6 | 4.4 | —N/a | 91.2 |
| 6 Oct 2026 | Noto | – | | | | | |
| 6 Oct 2026 | Noto | – | PD | 44.0 | 24.0 | 32.0 | 20.0 |
| 6 Oct 2026 | Noto | – | M5S | 24.0 | 60.0 | 16.0 | 36.0 |
| 6 Oct 2026 | Noto | – | AVS | 25.0 | 52.0 | 22.0 | 27.0 |
| 6 Oct 2026 | Noto | – | IV | —N/a | —N/a | —N/a | —N/a |
| 28 Sep 2026 | Only Numbers | 1,000 | | | | | |
| 28 Sep 2026 | Only Numbers | 1,000 | PD | 62.6 | 21.7 | 15.7 | 40.9 |
| 28 Sep 2026 | Only Numbers | 1,000 | M5S | 11.6 | 46.4 | 42.0 | 34.8 |
| 28 Sep 2026 | Only Numbers | 1,000 | AVS | 43.5 | 36.0 | 20.5 | 7.5 |
| 28 Sep 2026 | Only Numbers | 1,000 | IV | 92.0 | 4.0 | 4.0 | 88.0 |
| 18–22 Sep 2026 | Quorum | 810 | | | | | |
| 18–22 Sep 2026 | Quorum | 810 | PD | 45.0 | 55.0 | – | 10.0 |
| 18–22 Sep 2026 | Quorum | 810 | M5S | 32.0 | 68.0 | – | 36.0 |
| 18–22 Sep 2026 | Quorum | 810 | AVS | 11.0 | 89.0 | – | 78.0 |
| 18–22 Sep 2026 | Quorum | 810 | IV | – | – | – | – |
| 14 Sep 2026 | Only Numbers | 1,000 | | | | | |
| 14 Sep 2026 | Only Numbers | 1,000 | PD | 63.4 | 23.6 | 13.0 | 39.8 |
| 14 Sep 2026 | Only Numbers | 1,000 | M5S | 10.5 | 53.7 | 35.8 | 43.2 |
| 14 Sep 2026 | Only Numbers | 1,000 | AVS | 60.0 | 32.5 | 7.5 | 27.5 |
| 14 Sep 2026 | Only Numbers | 1,000 | IV | 92.0 | 8.0 | – | 84.0 |

==== Who should be part of the centre-right coalition ====
===== Acceptance of Roberto Vannacci =====
Polling
| Fieldwork date | Polling firm | Sample size | Yes | No | Don't know No answer | Lead |
|---|---|---|---|---|---|---|
| 10–11 Nov 2026 | Eumetra | 800 (Note: Only voters of the centre-right coalition composed of Brothers of Italy, the League, Forza Italia, Us Moderates, and South calls North) | 59.8 | 36.8 | 3.4 | 23.0 |
| 10–11 Nov 2026 | Eumetra | 800 (Note: Only voters of National Future) | 68.7 | 24.2 | 7.1 | 44.5 |
| 18–22 Sep 2026 | Quorum | – | 51.0 | 31.0 | 18.0 | 20.0 |
| 14 Sep 2026 | Only Numbers | 1,000 | 40.5 | 41.3 | 18.2 | 0.8 |

Polling
| Fieldwork date | Polling firm | Sample size | Electorate | Yes | No | Don't know No answer | Lead |
|---|---|---|---|---|---|---|---|
| 18–22 Sep 2026 | Quorum | – | FdI | 59.0 | 29.0 | 12.0 | 30.0 |
| 18–22 Sep 2026 | Quorum | – | FN | 56.0 | 28.0 | 16.0 | 28.0 |
| 18–22 Sep 2026 | Quorum | – | FI | 30.0 | 40.0 | 30.0 | 10.0 |
| 18–22 Sep 2026 | Quorum | – | Lega | 30.0 | 40.0 | 30.0 | 10.0 |
| 18–22 Sep 2026 | Quorum | – | NM | 30.0 | 40.0 | 30.0 | 10.0 |
| 15–16 Sep 2026 | Eumetra | 800 | FdI | 41.4 | 42.5 | 16.1 | 1.1 |
| 15–16 Sep 2026 | Eumetra | 800 | FN | 90.1 | 8.6 | 1.3 | 81.5 |
| 15–16 Sep 2026 | Eumetra | 800 | FI | 20.9 | 58.4 | 20.7 | 37.5 |
| 15–16 Sep 2026 | Eumetra | 800 | Lega | 43.6 | 41.9 | 14.5 | 1.7 |
| 15–16 Sep 2026 | Eumetra | 800 | NM | – | – | – | – |
| 14 Sep 2026 | Only Numbers | 1,000 | FdI | 41.8 | 39.9 | 18.3 | 1.9 |
| 14 Sep 2026 | Only Numbers | 1,000 | FI | 37.2 | 58.8 | 4.0 | 21.6 |
| 14 Sep 2026 | Only Numbers | 1,000 | Lega | 39.5 | 23.7 | 36.8 | 15.8 |
| 14 Sep 2026 | Only Numbers | 1,000 | NM | – | – | – | – |
