= 2027 Italian centre-left primary election =

- February 2027
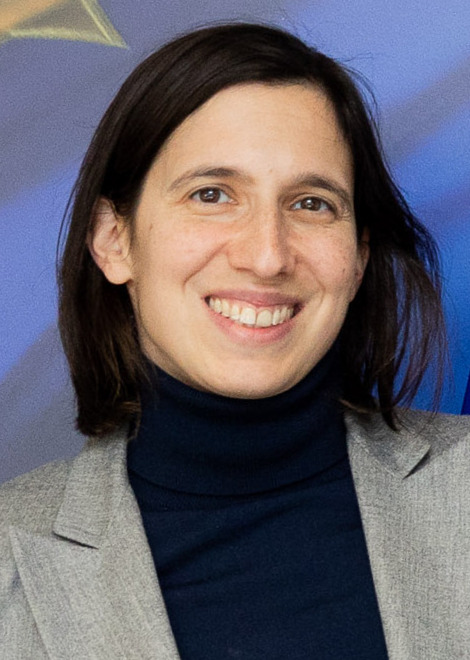

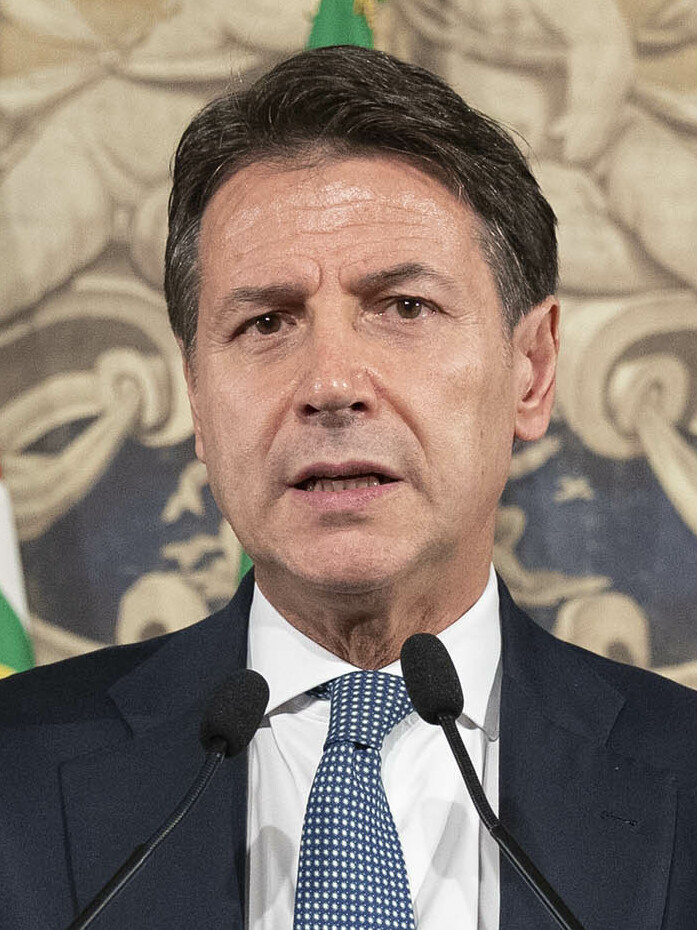

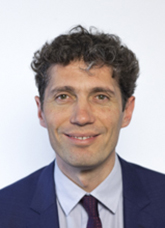

| Candidate | Elly Schlein | Giuseppe Conte |
| Party | Democratic Party | Five Star Movement |
| Candidate | Riccardo Magi | Ernesto Maria Ruffini |
| Party | More Europe | Plus One |

The 2027 Italian centre-left primary election is a primary election scheduled for February 2027.

== Background ==
=== Coalition agreement ===
Following their victory in the 2026 Italian constitutional referendum, the centre-left coalition parties began discussions to organize a primary election to choose a leader to represent the entire coalition in the 2027 Italian general election, as the electoral law approved in October 2026 (Stabilicum) required the coalition leader's name to be explicitly included. First talks started since June 2026 between the leaders of Democratic Party, Five Star Movement, and Greens and Left Alliance to discuss the campaign platform. Some key politicians like Nicola Fratoianni and Angelo Bonelli argued that primary election may harm coalition unity, advocating for another solution instead. Roberto Speranza proposed to candidate a figurehead like a partisan or an eighteen-year-old. On 30 October, Schlein, Conte, Bonelli, and Fratoianni approved a provisional roadmap to adopt a common electoral platform in November and hold the primary election in February 2027.

=== Internal consultations ===
Since the Democratic Party allowed two of its members to run for office in 2012 (with Pierluigi Bersani and Matteo Renzi), the party's reformist wing was considering nominating Giorgio Gori as its candidate. On 18 October 2026, the National Assembly of the Democratic Party approved Schlein as the party candidate for the primary election with 578 votes in favour, 3 against, and 26 abstentions. The reformist wing, led by Lorenzo Guerini, announced its abstention.

== Declared candidates ==
| Candidate | Date of birth | Party | Most recent position | Announced | Ref. |
|---|---|---|---|---|---|
| Elly Schlein | 4 May 1985 (age 41) | Democratic Party (PD) | Secretary of the Democratic Party (since 2023) Other positions: Vice President of Emilia-Romagna (2020–2022); Member of the Chamber of Deputies (2022–present); Member of the European Parliament (2014–2019) | 18 October 2026 | |
| Giuseppe Conte | 8 August 1964 (age 62) | Five Star Movement (M5S) | Leader of the Five Star Movement (since 2021) Other positions: Member of the Chamber of Deputies (2022–present); Prime Minister of Italy (2018–2021) | 23 March 2026 | |
| Riccardo Magi | 7 August 1976 (age 50) | More Europe (+E) | Secretary of More Europe (since 2023) Other positions: Member of the Chamber of Deputies (since 2018); President of More Europe (2021–2023); Secretary of Italian Radicals (2015–2018); President of Italian Radicals (2014–2015); Municipal Councillor of Rome (2013–2016) | 16 August 2026 | |
| Ernesto Maria Ruffini | 21 June 1969 (age 57) | Plus One (PU) | Director General of Agenzia delle Entrate (2014–2025) | 20 December 2025 | |

=== Declared their interest ===
- Clemente Mastella of Us of the Centre stated his interest on 30 March.
- Enzo Maraio of the Italian Socialist Party declared on 6 October that there would be a socialist candidate and did not rule out his own candidacy.
- Alessandro Onorato of Civic Project Italy declared on 23 October that he could run for the primary election.
- Vincenzo Spadafora of Spring declared on 5 November that he might run.

== Non-participants ==
- Vincenzo De Luca, mayor of Salerno.
- Franco Gabrielli of Plus One endorsed Elly Schlein.
- Roberto Gualtieri, mayor of Rome.
- Gaetano Manfredi, mayor of Naples.
- Michela Ponzani, a historian and television host, is rumoured as a possible Greens and Left Alliance candidate.
- Matteo Renzi, president of Italia Viva.
- Silvia Salis, mayor of Genoa, stated on 12 September that she would cast a blank ballot.

== Opinion polling ==
| Fieldwork date | Polling firm | Sample size | | | | | | | | | | Others Don't know | Lead |
| Fieldwork date | Polling firm | Sample size | Schlein | Conte | Salis | Fratoianni | Bonelli | Renzi | Bersani | Decaro | Manfredi | Others Don't know | Lead |
|---|---|---|---|---|---|---|---|---|---|---|---|---|---|
| 10–11 Nov 2026 | Eumetra | 800 | 49.6 | 50.4 | —N/a | —N/a | —N/a | —N/a | —N/a | —N/a | —N/a | —N/a | 0.8 |
| 5 Nov 2026 | Noto | – | 46.0 | 40.0 | —N/a | —N/a | —N/a | —N/a | —N/a | —N/a | —N/a | 14.0 | 6.0 |
| 16–22 Oct 2026 | Excellera Advisory Group | – | 26.2 | 46.5 | 16.2 | —N/a | —N/a | —N/a | —N/a | —N/a | —N/a | —N/a | 20.3 |
| 20 Oct 2026 | Noto | – | 49.0 | 46.0 | —N/a | —N/a | —N/a | —N/a | —N/a | —N/a | —N/a | 5.0 5.0 – Alessandro Onorato | 3.0 |
| 17–19 Oct 2026 | BiDiMedia | 1,000 | 52.7 | 47.3 | —N/a | —N/a | —N/a | —N/a | —N/a | —N/a | —N/a | —N/a | 5.4 |
| 17–19 Oct 2026 | BiDiMedia | 1,000 | 39.0 | 35.0 | —N/a | —N/a | —N/a | —N/a | —N/a | —N/a | —N/a | 26.0 26.0 – Another candidate | 4.0 |
| 17 Oct 2026 | Lab21 | – | 27.2 | 41.5 | —N/a | 2.9 | 4.2 | 11.1 | —N/a | —N/a | —N/a | 12.8 12.8 – Alessandro Onorato | 14.6 |
| 14–15 Oct 2026 | Only Numbers | 800 | 31.4 | 32.5 | —N/a | —N/a | —N/a | —N/a | —N/a | —N/a | —N/a | 36.1 23.0 – Won't vote 13.1 – Don't know/No answer | 1.1 |
| 13–14 Oct 2026 | Eumetra | 800 | 43.3 | 56.7 | —N/a | —N/a | —N/a | —N/a | —N/a | —N/a | —N/a | —N/a | 13.4 |
| 5–8 Oct 2026 | Sigma Piave | 800 | 38.0 | 42.0 | —N/a | —N/a | —N/a | —N/a | —N/a | —N/a | —N/a | 20.0 9.0 – Neither; 11.0 – Don't know | 4.0 |
| 6 Oct 2026 | Noto | (Note: Scenario among likely voters) | 51.0 | 44.0 | —N/a | —N/a | —N/a | —N/a | —N/a | —N/a | —N/a | 5.0 (Note: Generic civic candidate) | 7.0 |
| 29–30 Sep 2026 | Demopolis | (Note: Scenario among likely voters (1.5 million)) | 43.0 | 41.0 | —N/a | —N/a | —N/a | —N/a | —N/a | —N/a | —N/a | 16.0 | 2.0 |
| 29–30 Sep 2026 | Demopolis | (Note: Scenario among centre-left coalition voters (12 million)) | 40.0 | 44.0 | —N/a | —N/a | —N/a | —N/a | —N/a | —N/a | —N/a | 16.0 | 4.0 |
| 29–30 Sep 2026 | Demopolis | – | 26.0 | 33.0 | 20.0 | —N/a | —N/a | —N/a | —N/a | —N/a | —N/a | 21.0 5.0 – Alessandro Onorato and Ernesto Maria Ruffini; 16.0 – Don't know | 7.0 |
| 22–23 Sep 2026 | Eumetra | 800 | —N/a | —N/a | 21.2 | —N/a | —N/a | —N/a | 21.1 | 3.7 | 2.4 | 45.4 5.6 – Stefano Bonaccini; 4.9 – Roberto Gualtieri; 4.1 – Franco Gabrielli; 2.5 – Giorgio Gori; 2.5 – Giuseppe Sala; 2.2 – Ernesto Maria Ruffini; 29.8 – None of the above | 0.1 |
| 18–22 Sep 2026 | Quorum | (Note: High turnout scenario) | 30.9 | 27.2 | 17.3 | —N/a | —N/a | —N/a | —N/a | —N/a | —N/a | 24.6 | 3.7 |
| 18–22 Sep 2026 | Quorum | (Note: Low turnout scenario) | 38.6 | 22.3 | 20.7 | —N/a | —N/a | —N/a | —N/a | —N/a | —N/a | 18.4 | 16.3 |
| 16–18 Sep 2026 | Ipsos | – | 41.0 | 59.0 | —N/a | —N/a | —N/a | —N/a | —N/a | —N/a | —N/a | —N/a | 18.0 |
| 16–18 Sep 2026 | Ipsos | – | 22.0 | 38.0 | —N/a | —N/a | —N/a | —N/a | —N/a | —N/a | —N/a | 40.0 (Note: 20.0% for another candidate and 20.0% unsure, of which 4.0% would lean towards casting a blank or invalid ballot) | 16.0 |
| 14–18 Sep 2026 | Sigma Piave | – | 47.0 | 53.0 | —N/a | —N/a | —N/a | —N/a | —N/a | —N/a | —N/a | —N/a | 6.0 |
| 14–18 Sep 2026 | Sigma Piave | – | 32.0 | 42.0 | 21.0 | 5.0 | —N/a | —N/a | —N/a | —N/a | —N/a | —N/a | 10.0 |
| 14–18 Sep 2026 | Sigma Piave | – | 37.0 | 46.0 | —N/a | 5.0 | —N/a | 7.0 | —N/a | —N/a | —N/a | 5.0 4.0 – Matteo Hallissey; 1.0 – Alessandro Onorato | 9.0 |
| 15–16 Sep 2026 | Eumetra | – | 41.5 | 58.5 | —N/a | —N/a | —N/a | —N/a | —N/a | —N/a | —N/a | —N/a | 17.0 |
| 12 Sep 2026 | Noto | – | 56.0 | 44.0 | —N/a | —N/a | —N/a | —N/a | —N/a | —N/a | —N/a | —N/a | 12.0 |
| 12 Sep 2026 | Noto | – | 52.0 | 44.0 | —N/a | —N/a | —N/a | —N/a | —N/a | —N/a | —N/a | 4.0 | 8.0 |
| 2–10 Sep 2026 | Winpoll | – | 62.0 | 38.0 | —N/a | —N/a | —N/a | —N/a | —N/a | —N/a | —N/a | —N/a | 24.0 |
| 18 May 2026 | Demopolis | – | 44.0 | 40.0 | —N/a | —N/a | —N/a | —N/a | —N/a | —N/a | —N/a | 16.0 | 4.0 |
| 18 May 2026 | Demopolis | – | 32.0 | 35.0 | 20.0 | —N/a | —N/a | —N/a | —N/a | —N/a | —N/a | 13.0 | 3.0 |
| 4–5 May 2026 | BiDiMedia | – | 37.5 | 26.5 | 25.9 | —N/a | —N/a | —N/a | —N/a | —N/a | —N/a | 10.1 | 9.0 |
| 27–28 Apr 2026 | Only Numbers | – | 40.0 | 35.5 | —N/a | —N/a | —N/a | —N/a | —N/a | —N/a | —N/a | —N/a | 4.5 |
| 27–28 Apr 2026 | Only Numbers | – | 27.2 | 28.1 | —N/a | 2.4 | 3.5 | 5.8 | 15.6 | —N/a | —N/a | —N/a | 0.9 |
| 23 Apr 2026 | Only Numbers | – | 32.5 | 36.9 | —N/a | —N/a | —N/a | —N/a | —N/a | —N/a | —N/a | —N/a | 4.4 |
| 23 Apr 2026 | Only Numbers | – | 23.2 | 33.5 | —N/a | 0.8 | 3.6 | 6.2 | 13.0 | —N/a | —N/a | —N/a | 10.3 |
| 11–13 Apr 2026 | Quorum | – | 41.0 | 26.0 | 25.0 | 3.0 (Note: Generic Greens and Left Alliance candidate) | | —N/a | —N/a | —N/a | 1.0 | 4.0 (Note: Ernesto Maria Ruffini) | 15.0 |
| 11–13 Apr 2026 | Quorum | – | 36.0 | 26.0 | 29.0 | 5.0 | | —N/a | —N/a | —N/a | 1.0 | 3.0 | 10.0 |
| 27 Mar 2026 | Izi | – | 40.7 | 59.3 | —N/a | —N/a | —N/a | —N/a | —N/a | —N/a | —N/a | —N/a | 18.6 |
| 27 Mar 2026 | Izi | – | —N/a | 57.0 | 43.0 | —N/a | —N/a | —N/a | —N/a | —N/a | —N/a | —N/a | 14.0 |
| 27 Mar 2026 | Izi | – | 22.7 | 42.6 | 34.7 | —N/a | —N/a | —N/a | —N/a | —N/a | —N/a | —N/a | 7.9 |
| 27 Mar 2026 | Izi | – | 18.9 | 38.1 | 30.4 | 12.6 | | —N/a | —N/a | —N/a | —N/a | —N/a | 7.7 |
| 20–27 Mar 2026 | Winpoll | – | 61.0 | 39.0 | —N/a | —N/a | —N/a | —N/a | —N/a | —N/a | —N/a | —N/a | 22.0 |
| 4–5 Dec 2025 | Quorum | – | 31.0 | 29.0 | 28.0 | —N/a | —N/a | —N/a | —N/a | 9.0 | 3.0 | —N/a | 2.0 |
| 18–22 Nov 2025 | Quorum | – | 29.0 | 43.0 | 28.0 | —N/a | —N/a | —N/a | —N/a | —N/a | —N/a | —N/a | 14.0 |
| 6 Nov 2025 | BiDiMedia | 1,000 | 50.0 | —N/a | 50.0 | —N/a | —N/a | —N/a | —N/a | —N/a | —N/a | —N/a | 0.0 |
| 6 Nov 2025 | BiDiMedia | 1,000 | 58.0 | 42.0 | —N/a | —N/a | —N/a | —N/a | —N/a | —N/a | —N/a | —N/a | 16.0 |
| 6 Nov 2025 | BiDiMedia | 1,000 | —N/a | 44.0 | 56.0 | —N/a | —N/a | —N/a | —N/a | —N/a | —N/a | —N/a | 12.0 |
| 6 Nov 2025 | BiDiMedia | 1,000 | 27.0 | 30.0 | 31.0 | —N/a | —N/a | —N/a | —N/a | —N/a | 5.0 | 7.0 7.0 – Maurizio Landini | 1.0 |

Polling
| Fieldwork date | Polling firm | Sample size | Electorate | | Schlein | Conte | Won't vote | Don't know No answer | Others | Lead | | | | | | |
|---|---|---|---|---|---|---|---|---|---|---|---|---|---|---|---|---|
| Fieldwork date | Polling firm | Sample size | Electorate | | 5 Nov 2026 | Noto | – | CSX | | Lead | 46.0 | 40.0 | —N/a | —N/a | 14.0 | 6.0 |
| | PD | 84.0 | 11.0 | —N/a | 5 Nov 2026 | Noto | – | —N/a | 5.0 | 73.0 | | | | | | |
| | M5S | 2.0 | 91.0 | —N/a | 5 Nov 2026 | Noto | – | —N/a | 7.0 | 84.0 | | | | | | |
| | AVS | 72.0 | 15.0 | —N/a | 5 Nov 2026 | Noto | – | —N/a | 13.0 | 57.0 | | | | | | |
| | IV | 34.0 | 2.0 | —N/a | 5 Nov 2026 | Noto | – | —N/a | 64.0 | 30.0 | | | | | | |
| | +E | 34.0 | 12.0 | —N/a | 5 Nov 2026 | Noto | – | —N/a | 54.0 | 20.0 | | | | | | |
| 20 Oct 2026 | Noto | – | CSX | | 49.0 | 46.0 | —N/a | —N/a | 5.0 5.0 – Alessandro Onorato | 3.0 | | | | | | |
| 20 Oct 2026 | Noto | – | | PD | 79.0 | 13.0 | —N/a | —N/a | 8.0 8.0 – Alessandro Onorato | 66.0 | | | | | | |
| 20 Oct 2026 | Noto | – | | M5S | 2.0 | 97.0 | —N/a | —N/a | 1.0 1.0 – Alessandro Onorato | 95.0 | | | | | | |
| 20 Oct 2026 | Noto | – | | AVS | 75.0 | 22.0 | —N/a | —N/a | 3.0 3.0 – Alessandro Onorato | 53.0 | | | | | | |
| 20 Oct 2026 | Noto | – | | IV | —N/a | —N/a | —N/a | —N/a | —N/a | —N/a | | | | | | |
| 20 Oct 2026 | Noto | – | | +E | —N/a | —N/a | —N/a | —N/a | —N/a | —N/a | | | | | | |
| 14–15 Oct 2026 | Only Numbers | 800 | CSX | | 31.4 | 32.5 | 23.0 | 13.1 | —N/a | 1.1 | | | | | | |
| 14–15 Oct 2026 | Only Numbers | 800 | | PD | 53.8 | 8.6 | 21.4 | 16.2 | —N/a | 45.2 | | | | | | |
| 14–15 Oct 2026 | Only Numbers | 800 | | M5S | 1.4 | 79.2 | 16.6 | 2.8 | —N/a | 77.8 | | | | | | |
| 14–15 Oct 2026 | Only Numbers | 800 | | AVS | 28.9 | 15.8 | 26.4 | 28.9 | —N/a | 13.1 | | | | | | |
| 14–15 Oct 2026 | Only Numbers | 800 | | IV | 17.4 | 34.8 | 43.5 | 4.3 | —N/a | 17.4 | | | | | | |
| 14–15 Oct 2026 | Only Numbers | 800 | | +E | —N/a | —N/a | —N/a | —N/a | —N/a | —N/a | | | | | | |

== See also ==
- 2005 Italian centre-left primary election
- 2012 Italian centre-left primary election
