= Ernesto Maria Ruffini =

Director of Italian Revenue Agency
- In office 31 January 2020 – 31 December 2024
- Preceded by: Antonino Maggiore
- Succeeded by: Vincenzo Carbone
- In office 1 July 2017 – 12 September 2018
- Preceded by: Rossella Orlandi
- Succeeded by: Antonino Maggiore

Personal details
- Born: 21 June 1969 (age 57) Palermo, Italy
- Party: Plus One
- Education: University of Rome La Sapienza

Ernesto Maria Ruffini (born 21 June 1969) is an Italian politician, attorney and civil servant, leader of Plus One political party.

== Biography ==
Ernesto Maria Ruffini was born in Palermo, Sicily, in 1969. He is the son of politician and former minister Attilio Ruffini. His older brother Paolo Ruffini, is a journalist and former prefect of the Dicastery for Communication of the Holy See.

After graduating in law from La Sapienza University of Rome, he was admitted to the Italian Bar Association in 1998. In the same year, he began working as a tax lawyer at the law and tax firm of former minister Augusto Fantozzi, where he remained until his appointment as head of Equitalia in 2015.

In 2010, he took part in the first edition of the Leopolda convention in Florence, organised at the time by Giuseppe Civati and Matteo Renzi. During the event, he presented a tax reform proposal called "Fisco 2.0", which envisaged the extensive digitalisation of taxpayer services through the gradual introduction of several tools, including pre-filled tax returns, electronic invoicing, the electronic transmission of tax receipts and a receipt lottery.

In 2014, he was appointed to the Permanent Committee for Innovation and the Italian Digital Agenda at the Presidency of the Council of Ministers. In 2015, he was appointed chief executive officer of Equitalia, a company owned by the Agenzia delle Entrate (Italian Revenue Agency) and the National Institute for Social Security, responsible for public tax collection.

During his three-year term, he significantly accelerated the company's digitalisation, introducing services such as a virtual help desk through which taxpayers could check their outstanding debts and request instalment plans for tax bills, as well as an SMS service reminding them of upcoming instalment deadlines.

In 2017, upon the proposal of Minister of Economy and Finance Pier Carlo Padoan, the Gentiloni government appointed him director of the Italian Revenue Agency. In this capacity, he also became chairman of Agenzia delle entrate – Riscossione, the new public body that had replaced Equitalia.

During his tenure, the Revenue Agency underwent an organisational restructuring and expanded its digital services, including the possibility of booking appointments online or speaking with an employee via video call without having to visit a physical office. Electronic invoicing was also introduced, tax refund processing times were reduced, particularly for VAT, and the pre-filled tax return system was expanded, accompanied by a statement explaining how the government had used the taxes paid by taxpayers. Partly as a result of this digitalisation drive, in 2017 the Revenue Agency exceeded €20 billion in recovered tax revenue for the first time.

In 2018, he was replaced by Guardia di Finanza general Antonino Maggiore, following a decision by the first Conte government. In January 2020, upon the proposal of Minister of Economy and Finance Roberto Gualtieri, the second Conte government reappointed him to head both the Revenue Agency and its tax collection arm.

During the COVID-19 pandemic in Italy, the Revenue Agency used its databases to develop a system for cross-referencing information, enabling it to distribute more than €20 billion in non-repayable grants directly into the bank accounts of businesses, artisans and professionals affected by the economic downturn.

During Ruffini's second term, the Revenue Agency further expanded the online services available to citizens and tax intermediaries, including the issuance of documents (such as certificates, tax identification numbers and health insurance cards), the filing of inheritance tax returns, requests for tax refunds, registration of rental agreements, and access to cadastral and mortgage databases.

In 2021, the Draghi government, upon the proposal of Minister of Economy and Finance Daniele Franco, confirmed Ruffini in his position. In 2023, the Meloni government reconfirmed him as head of both the Revenue Agency and Riscossione.

On 13 December 2024, in an interview with Corriere della Sera, he announced his intention to resign as head of the Revenue Agency.

=== Political career ===
In June 2025, after resigning as director of the Revenue Agency, Ruffini launched the Plus One committees, modelled on the Prodi Committees, with the aim of building a centrist political area within the centre-left coalition.

On 6 October 2026, Ruffini signed the party's founding deed, while its first national assembly was held on 10 October. On 22 October, Ruffini and former police chief, Franco Gabrielli, presented the party's official platform in Rome, calling for the creation of a unified electoral list of centrist progressive forces ahead of the 2027 general election.
