= 2025 More Europe leadership election =

Congressional primary election

- 9 February 2025

300 delegates for the Congress 151 delegates votes needed to win
- Registered: 5,875
- Turnout: 5,204 (88.6%)
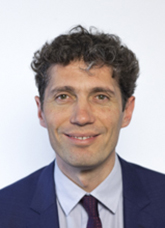

Candidate	Riccardo Magi	Blank ballots
Delegate count	205	72
Percentage	74.0%	26.0%
Previous Secretary
Riccardo Magi
Secretary
Riccardo Magi

The 2025 More Europe leadership election was a congressional primary election that took place on 7, 8, and 9 February 2025 in Rome to elect the new party leadership. Riccardo Magi has been re-elected as secretary of More Europe, while Matteo Hallissey, former secretary and current president of Italian Radicals, has been elected as president. Hallissey won against the former secretary of More Europe, Benedetto Della Vedova, despite the latter having the endorsement of Riccardo Magi and Emma Bonino.

== Procedure ==
=== Timetable ===
Timetable of events for the 2025 More Europe leadership election
Date(s)	Event
27 October 2024	Assembly approves the Congress rules and deliberates on key dates for the third Congress. Primaries begin.
31 December 2024	Enrollment for members closes.
7 January 2025	Opening of the pre-congressional phase.
9 January	Submission of candidacies for delegates closes.
10 January	Submission of candidacies for statutory amendments opens.
11–19 January	Party members can endorse candidacies for delegates.
26–27–28 January	Election of delegates takes place.
28 January	Publication of results for the elected delegates.
29 January	Submission of candidacies for statutory amendments closes.
1–6 February	Signing on statutory amendments takes place.
28 January–9 February	Filing of candidacies for the Secretary, President, Treasurer, and Assembly lists.
7–9 February	Start of the Congress, held in Rome.
9 February	Submission of candidacies for Assembly lists closes.
9 February	Election of the Secretary, President, Treasurer, and Assembly members takes place.

== Candidates ==
=== Secretary ===
Portrait	Name	Most recent position	Announced	Refs
	Riccardo Magi (age 49)	Member of the Chamber of Deputies for More Europe (2018–present) Other positions: President of More Europe (2021–2023); Secretary of Italian Radicals (2015–2018); President of Italian Radicals (2014–2015); Municipal Councillor of Rome (2013–2016)	9 February 2025	

=== Assembly Lists ===
List	Campaign website	Top candidate	Supported Secretary
Heretic! (Eretika!)	—	Alfonso Maria Gallo	—
Europeanism or Fascism (Europeismo o Fascismo)	Facebook page	Agnese Balducci	Riccardo Magi
IMAGIne The European Revolution (ImMAGIna La Rivoluzione Europea	Facebook page	Riccardo Magi	Riccardo Magi
Operation Millennium (Operazione Millennium)	—	Angelo Cenicola	—
Let's Root More Europe in the Territories (Radichiamo +Europa sui Territori)	—	Riccardo Volpe	Riccardo Magi
United States of Europe (Stati Uniti d'Europa)	Facebook page	Benedetto Della Vedova	—
Source: Assembly lists

== Results ==
=== Secretary ===
Candidate	Votes	%
Riccardo Magi	205	74.01
Blank ballots	72	25.99
Total	277	100.00
Valid votes	277	94.86
Invalid votes	20	6.85
Votes cast / Turnout	292	97.33
Abstentions	8	2.67
Registered delegates	300	100.00
Source: Results

Vote by delegates
Magi	74.0%
Blank ballots	26.0%

=== President ===
Candidate	Votes	%
Matteo Hallissey	198	69.47
Benedetto Della Vedova	87	30.52
Total	285	100.00
Valid votes	285	96.61
Invalid votes	4	1.35
Blank votes	7	2.36
Votes cast / Turnout	296	98.7
Abstentions	4	1.33
Registered delegates	300	100.00
Source: Results

Vote by delegates
Hallissey	69.5%
Della Vedova	30.5%

=== Delegates ===
Lists	Votes	%	Weighted votes	%	Delegates
IMAGIne The European Revolution	—N/a		2,425.7	40.83	123 / 300
Operation Millennium	—N/a		1,508.75	25.40	76 / 300
United States of Europe	—N/a		835.5	14.06	42 / 300
Heretik!	—N/a		657.7	11.07	33 / 300
Europeanism or Fascism	—N/a		512.9	8.63	26 / 300
Total	—N/a		5,940.55	100.00	300
Valid votes	—N/a		5,940.55	99.14	—N/a
Invalid and blank votes	—N/a		51.7	0.86	—N/a
Votes cast / Turnout	5,204	88.58	5,992.25	88.13	—N/a
Abstentions	671	11.42	807.40	11.87	—N/a
Registered voters	5,875	100.00	6,799.65	100.00	—N/a
Source: Delegates elected

=== Assembly ===
Lists	Votes	%	Seats
Operation Millennium	70	23.97	21 / 100
Let's Root More Europe in the Territories	57	19.52	18 / 100
IMAGIne The European Revolution	56	19.18	17 / 100
United States of Europe	45	15.41	14 / 100
Heretik!	36	12.33	11 / 100
Europeanism or Fascism	28	9.59	9 / 100
Blank votes	3	1.03	—N/a
Votes cast / Turnout	295	98.33	—N/a
Abstenstions	5	1.67	—N/a
Magi's list (Note: Ten seats are assigned to the winner Secretary's list, that does not directly run as an Assembly list.)			10 / 100
Total	300	100.0	100
Source: Results

== Aftermath ==
Just four days before the party enrollment closed for voting on December 31, 1,900 people, mainly from Giugliano in Campania and Afragola, joined the party. After party members elected the delegates, 61 delegates from the "ImMAGIna" list led by Riccardo Magi split off and created their own list called "Let's Root More Europe in the Territories," led by Rosario Mariniello. This led to a heated confrontation during the Congress, as the Board of Trustees of More Europe was tasked with investigating the sudden mass memberships and verifying whether each of the 1,900 individuals had paid with their own credit card. However, the Board failed to determine the regularity of these memberships since privacy rules prevented verification of the payments.
