= Plus One (political party) =

Political party in Italy

Plus One Più Uno
- Leader: Ernesto Maria Ruffini
- Founded: 1 March 2025 (association); 10 October 2026 (party)
- Headquarters: Viale Carso 57, Rome
- Ideology: Christian left Pro-Europeanism
- Political position: Centre-left
- National affiliation: Centre-left coalition
- Colors: Orange Blue
- Chamber of Deputies: 0 / 400
- Senate: 0 / 205
- European Parliament: 0 / 76
- Regional Councils: 0 / 896

Website
- www.piu.uno

Plus One (Italian: Più Uno, PU) is a Christian leftist political party in Italy led by Ernesto Maria Ruffini.

== History ==
Ernesto Maria Ruffini is an attorney and the son of Attilio Ruffini, a former Christian Democracy politician and minister. Ruffini was appointed in 2015 as the Director General of Agenzia delle Entrate until 13 December 2024, when he left his post due to disagreements with the Meloni government over the fight against tax evasion.

The association was officially registered on 1 March 2025, but it was not publicly unveiled until June 2025 with the launch of the Plus One Committees. The name and the structure were inspired by the Prodi Committees (formally called the Committees for the Italy We Want), launched in 1995, that were a prelude to the birth of The Olive Tree coalition. Bruno Tabacci, leader of Democratic Centre, supported Ruffini's project in an interview. On December, Ruffini announced his candidacy for the 2027 Italian centre-left primary election. In August 2026, Ruffini announced that Plus One would become a party on 10 October. On 2 October, Franco Gabrielli, former chief of the italian State Police, joined the party. On 26 October, Rome city councillor Dario Nanni joined Plus One.

== See also ==
- List of political parties in Italy
