= Electoral list =

Grouping of candidates for election

An electoral list is a grouping of candidates in an election, usually found in proportional or mixed electoral systems, but also in some plurality electoral systems. An electoral list can be registered by a political party (a party list) or can constitute a group of independent candidates (an electoral citizens' list or civic list). Lists can be open, in which case electors have some influence over the ranking of the winning candidates on the list, or closed, in which case the order of candidates is fixed at the registration of the list. Pure open list (including free list variants) systems are essentially mechanisms pooling vote for individual candidates of parties. Electoral lists are required for party-list proportional representation systems, but not all proportional representation systems use lists and not all systems using lists provide proportional representation.

An electoral list is made according to the applying nomination rules and election rules. Depending on the type of election, a political party, a general assembly, or a board meeting, may elect or appoint a nominating committee that will add, and if required, prioritize list-candidates according to their preferences. Qualification, popularity, gender, age, geography, and occupation are preferences that may influence the committee's work. The committee's proposed list may then be changed in a selection meeting, where new candidates may be added, or existing candidates may be moved or removed from the list. When the internal process is over, the final list is made public. The list may be printed on the ballot paper cast by voters at the election, or on a separate voter information paper.

Not all groupings on candidates on ballots are called electoral lists. Some multi-winner electoral systems may allow parties to appear on the ballot by grouping candidates (such as in the case of Australia for the Senate, which uses a variant of the single transferable vote) and may even allow voters a shortcut to vote for all these candidates together (group voting ticket). A system only becomes a list-based system as opposed to a candidate based system, if seats are primarily allocated to parties, and then to candidates within those parties. There are however, hybrid systems, such as that of Estonia, where candidates may win seats purely based on their votes before any list seats are allocated.

== Types ==
=== Open list ===
Open lists system have great variance, but their common trait is that the ordering of candidates may be influenced by voters choosing between different candidates on the list.

==== Optional open lists ====
Where individual political parties choose either closed or open lists, such as in Colombia.

==== Flexible list ====
In systems with flexible lists, the lists are in principle open, but parties also must submit a default ordering of candidates, which may only be overriden by preference votes if certain conditions are fulfilled.

A relatively closed open list system is one where a candidate must reach a full electoral quota of votes on their own to be assured of winning a seat. The total number of seats won by the party minus the number of its candidates that achieved this quota gives the number of unfilled seats. These are then successively allocated to the party's not-yet-elected candidates who were ranked highest on the party list.

In a "more open" list system, the quota for election of an individual representative could be lowered from the above amount. It is then possible that more of a party's candidates achieve this quota than the total seats won by the party.

==== Fully open lists ====
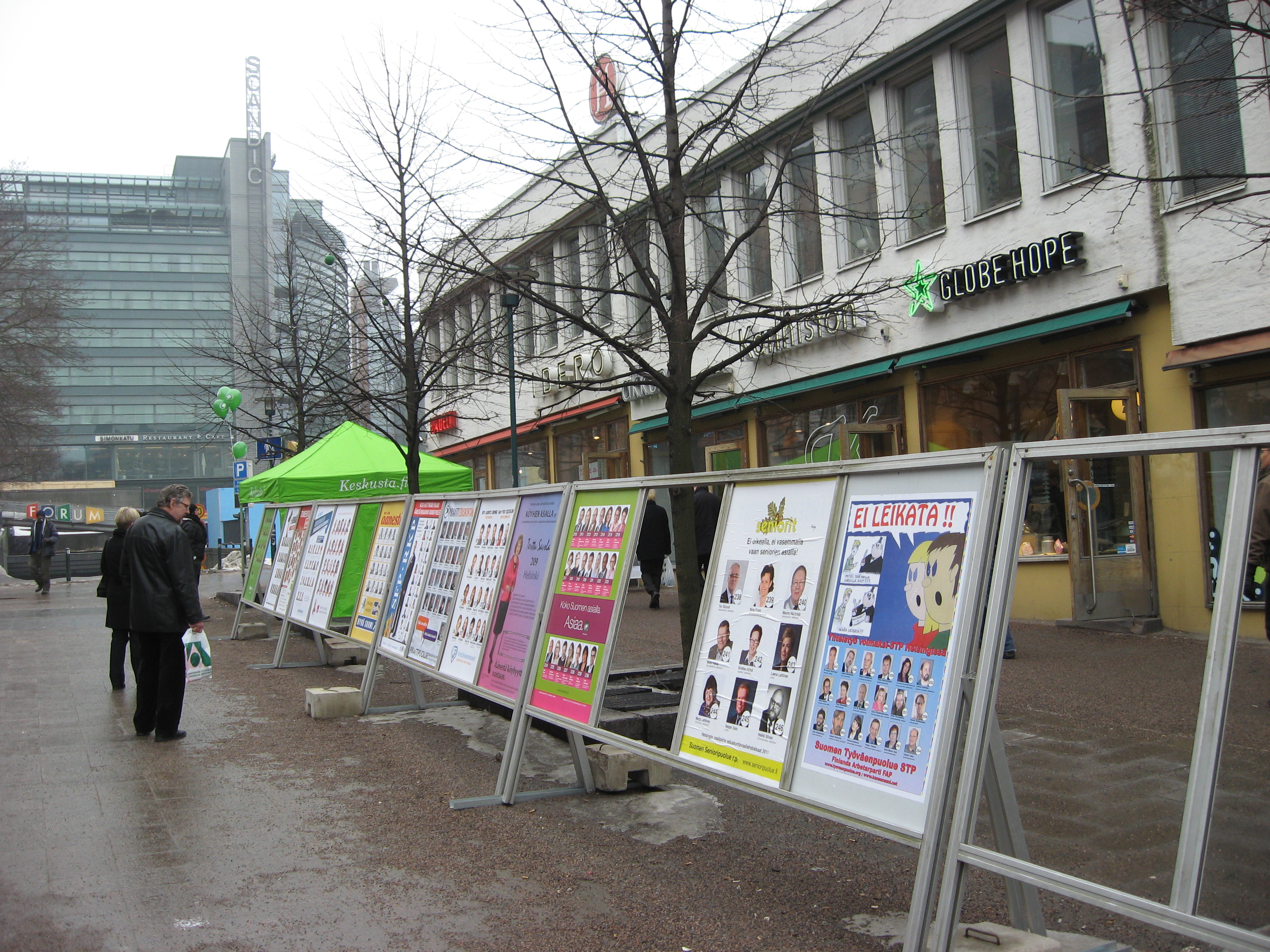
Finnish parliamentary election uses the open list method. Here an official poster rack in central Helsinki displays the candidates and their assigned ballot numbers by party.

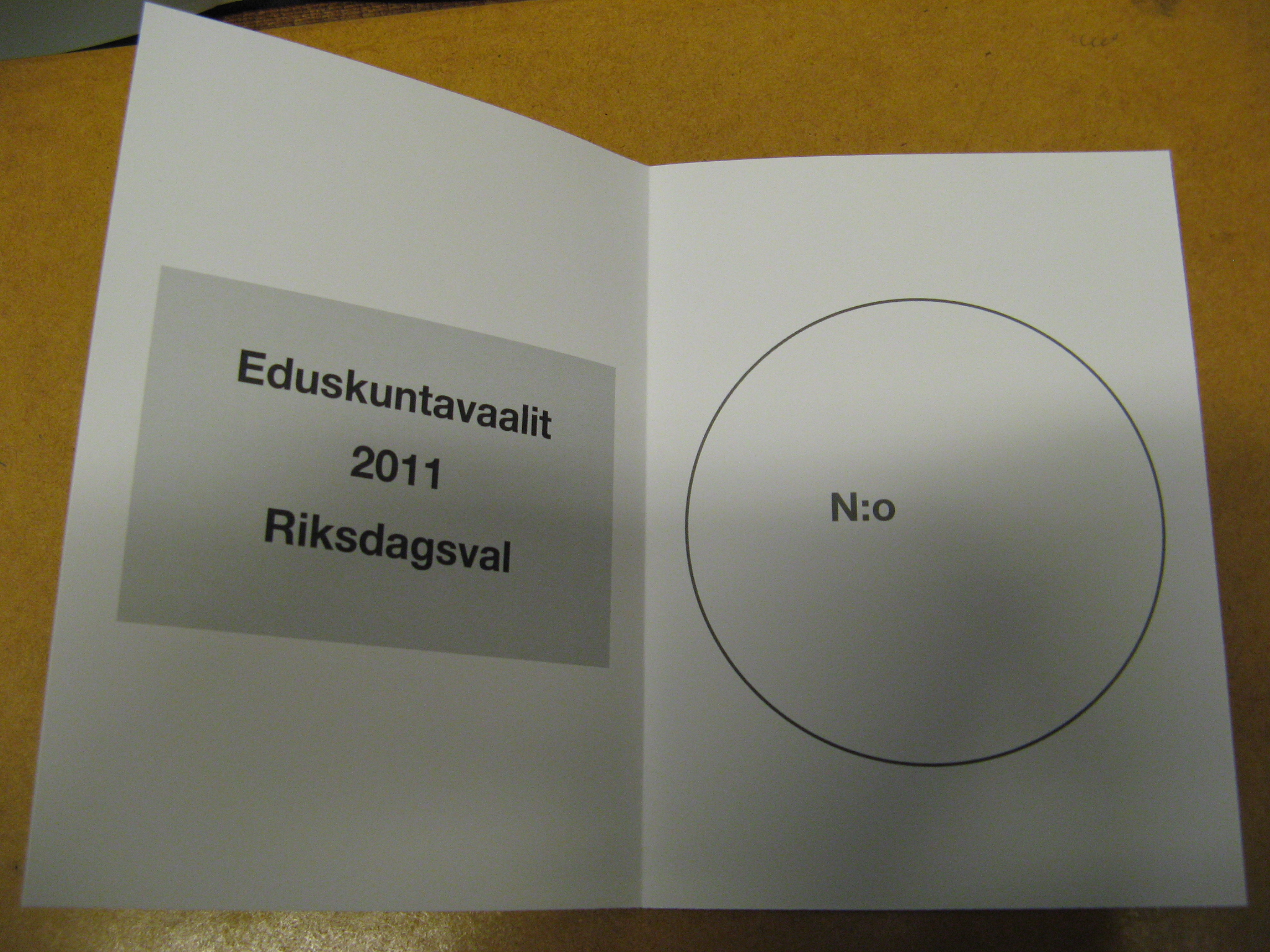
Ballot during the Finnish parliamentary election of 2011

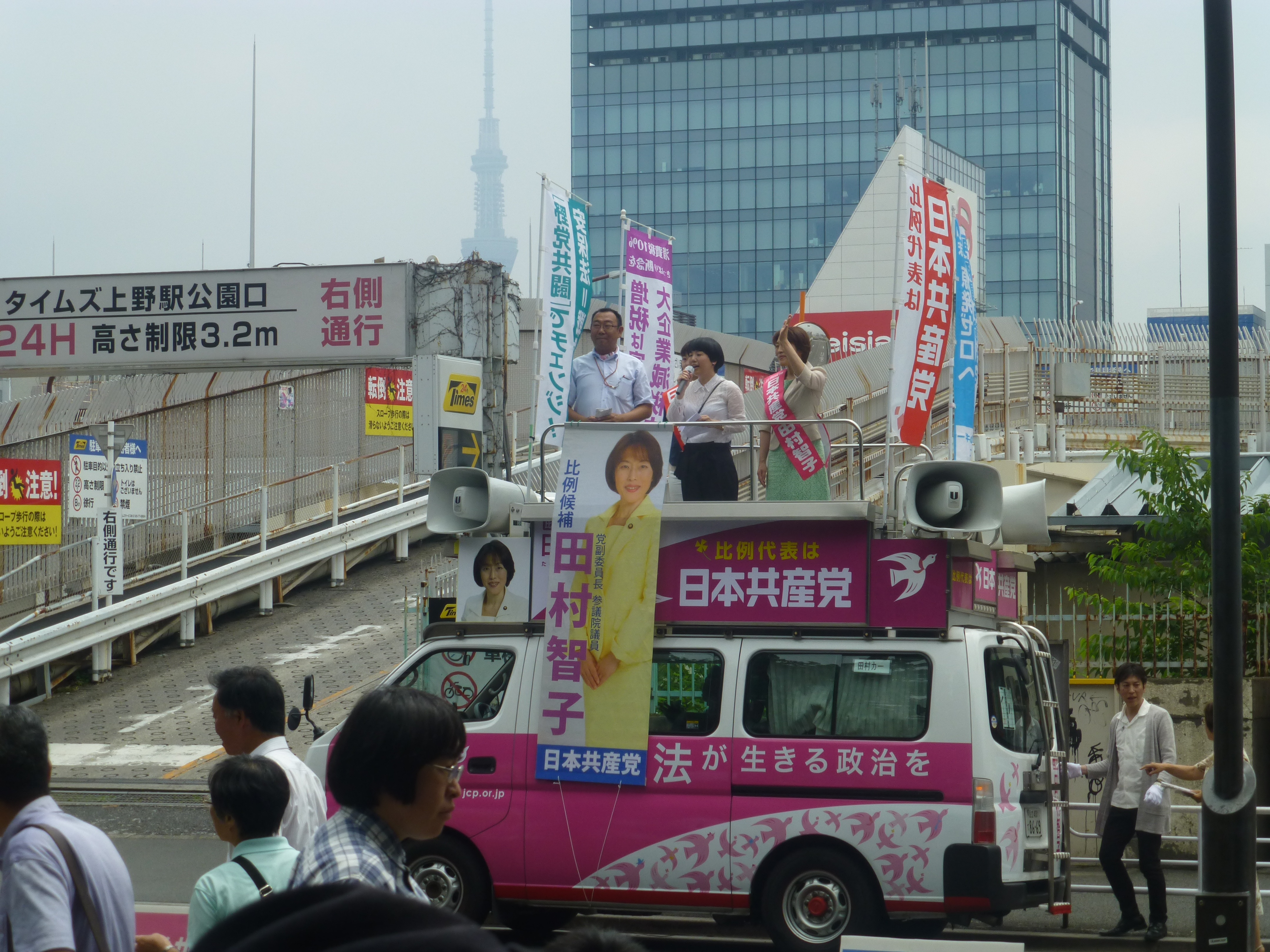
A campaign bus in Tokyo for (successful) Communist proportional candidate Tomoko Tamura in Japan's 2016 Councillors election. Tamura received roughly half of her votes in Tokyo, other proportional candidates on the same list won most of their votes in other prefectures. The proportional district is nationwide; but limited by a very short legal campaign period, some proportional candidates focus their campaign efforts on only certain regions where they personally or their party have a local base.

The most-open list, fully-open list, or simply open list system is one where the number of votes for each candidate fully determines the order of election. This system is used in all Finnish, Latvian, and Brazilian multiple-seat elections. Since 2001, lists of this "most open" type have also been used in the elections to fill the 96 proportional seats in the 242-member upper house of Japan.

Since 2018, in Brazil, fully open lists are used with the extra condition that any candidate may only earn a seat if they reach 10% of the quota via their personal votes. The lists still remain unordered and candidates are fully ordered by their votes.

==== Partially open lists ====
Some system use a combination of open and closed lists in a way that certain positions on a list are locked while other are open. An example is the new Italian electoral system or the one in force between 2015-2017.

==== Free list (panachage) ====
A free list or "mixed list", more usually called panachage, is a variant on the most open list where voters may support candidates on different lists. Candidates within the lists are typically elected using either cumulative or block plurality voting. This gives the voters full control over which candidates are elected, not just within a particular party, but even across them. As a result, independents are not forced to support candidates of only one party, and can support candidates across multiple lists, while still ensuring the results are ultimately proportional. It is used in elections at all levels in Liechtenstein, Luxembourg, and Switzerland, in congressional elections El Salvador and Honduras, as well as in local elections in a majority of German states, in French communes with under 1,000 inhabitants, and in Czech municipal elections.

=== Replacement lists ===
When an elected representative vacates their seat, the casual vacancy in a list-PR system is typically filled by the highest-ranked candidate on the departed representative's list who was not already elected. For personal or party-strategic reasons, this person may choose to cede the place to a lower-ranked colleague. Replacement lists are sometimes used to fill casual vacancies in single transferable vote electoral systems. An example is European Parliament elections in Ireland since 1984.

== Ballot format ==
Some ways to operate a list system when using traditional paper-based voting are as follows:

- One method (used in Belgium and the Netherlands) is to have a large ballot paper with a box for each party and sub-boxes for the various candidates. In Belgium, when electronic voting is used (in Flanders and Ostbelgien), the voter has to choose with an electronic pencil on a touchscreen between lists and blank vote, then on the list's page between the top box (vote for the list without preference for specific candidates) or the box(es) for one or several candidates on the same list.
- Another method (used in the Czech Republic and Slovakia) is to have a separate ballot paper for each party. To maintain voter secrecy, the voter is handed ballot papers for every party. The voter chooses the candidates (or may vote for the party as a whole) on one of the ballot papers, for example, by drawing circles around the candidate numbers (which is why casting preference votes is called circling in the Czech Republic and Slovakia). Then, the voter puts the party ballot paper into an envelope and puts the envelope into the ballot box.

In Brazil, each candidate is assigned a number (in which the first 2 digits are the party number and the others the candidate's number within the party). The voting machine has a telephone-like panel where the voter presses the buttons for the number of their chosen candidate. In Finland, each candidate is assigned a 3-digit number.

== By country ==
=== Austria ===
Flexible lists: the members of the National Council are elected by open list proportional representation in nine multi-member constituencies based on the states (with varying in size from 7 to 36 seats) and 39 districts. Voters are able to cast a single party vote and one preference votes each on the federal, state and electoral district level for their preferred candidates within that party. The thresholds for a candidate to move up the list are 7% of the candidate's party result on the federal level, 10% on the state level and 14% on the electoral district level. Candidates for the district level are listed on the ballot while voters need to write-in their preferred candidate on state and federal level.

=== Croatia ===
Flexible lists: in Croatia, the voter can give their vote to a single candidate on their chosen list, but only candidates who have received at least 10% of the party's votes take precedence over the other candidates on the list.

=== Czech Republic ===
Flexible lists: In Czech parliamentary elections, voters are given 4 preference votes. Only candidates who have received more than 5% of preferential votes at the regional level take precedence over the list. For elections to the European Parliament, the procedure is identical but each voter is only allowed 2 preference votes.

=== Germany ===
Localized lists and statewide closed lists: In the Bundestag's electoral system, local candidates are elected by first-past-the-post, but a seat cap applies making it a localized list system. The state list (German: Landesliste) is a closed list of candidates nominated by political parties at the state level, allocate seats based on the party's share of the second vote (Zweitstimme)

=== Indonesia ===
In Indonesia, any candidate who has obtained at least 30% of the quota is automatically elected.

=== Italy ===
In Italy in order to submit candidacies (whether individual or on party lists), «some political forces (and, consequently, their electoral emblems) are required to collect signatures from voters endorsing their candidates; others, by virtue of their qualifying parliamentary representation or their performance in the most recent election, depending on the applicable rules, are exempt from this requirement and may appear directly on the ballot papers»; while still others are required to collect fewer signatures than would ordinarily be necessary.

=== Netherlands ===
Flexible lists: In the Netherlands, the voter can give their vote to any candidate in a list (for example, in elections for the House of Representatives); the vote for this candidate is called a "preference vote" (voorkeurstem in Dutch). Candidates with at least 25% of the quota takes priority over the party's other candidates who stand higher on the party list but received fewer preference votes. Most people vote for the top candidate, to indicate no special preference for any individual candidate, but support for the party in general; however, people sometimes want to express their support for a particular person. For example, some people vote for the first woman on the list. If a candidate gathers enough preference votes, then they get a seat in parliament, even if their position on the list would leave them without a seat. In the 2003 elections Hilbrand Nawijn, the former minister of migration and integration, was elected into parliament for the Pim Fortuyn List by preference votes even though he was the last candidate on the list.

=== New Zealand ===
In New Zealand's MMP system, the "party list" refers to the closed list of candidates nominated by a registered party for election to the New Zealand Parliament. Voters cast two votes: one for an electorate candidate and one for the party at large. The "party vote" determines the overall distribution of seats in Parliament, with candidates from the party list being elected based on their ranking on the list.

=== Slovakia ===
Flexible lists: In Slovakia, each voter may, in addition to the party, select one to four candidates from the ordered party list. Candidates who are selected by more than 3% of the party's voters are elected (in order of total number of votes) first and only then is the party ordering used. For European elections, voters select two candidates and the candidates must have more than 10% of the total votes to override the party list. In the European election in 2009 three of Slovakia's thirteen MEPs were elected solely by virtue of preference votes (having party-list positions too low to have won otherwise) and only one (Katarína Neveďalová of SMER) was elected solely by virtue of her position on the party list (having fewer preference votes than a number of other candidates who themselves, nevertheless had preferences from fewer than 10 percent of their party's voters).

=== Sweden ===
Flexible lists: In Sweden, a candidate needs to receive 5% of the party's votes for the personal vote to overrule the ordering on the party list. Voting without expressing a preference between individuals is possible, although the parties urge their voters to support the party's prime candidate, to protect them from being beaten by someone ranked lower by the party. The share of voters using the open list option at 2022 Swedish general election was 22.49%.

== See also ==
- Civic list (Italy)
- Electoral alliance
