= Taxation in Italy =

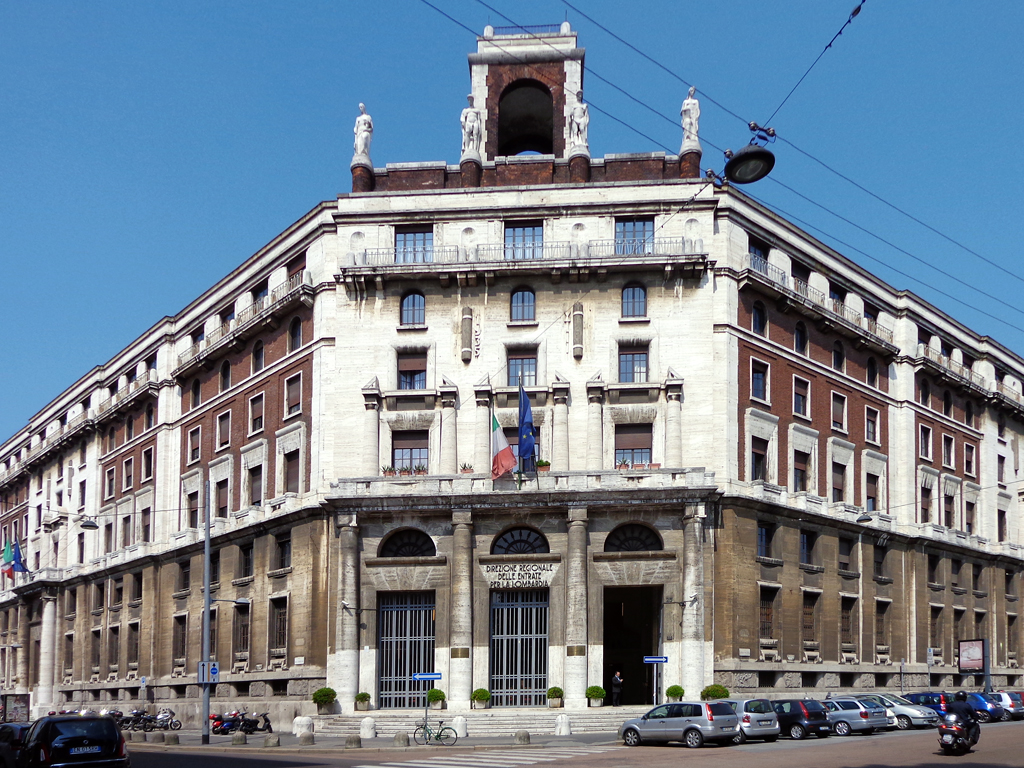
Italian Agency of Revenue building in Milan

Taxation in Italy is levied by the central and regional governments and is collected by the Italian Agency of Revenue (Agenzia delle Entrate). Total tax revenue in 2024 was 42.8% of GDP. The main earnings are income tax, social security, corporate tax and value added tax. All of these are collected at national level, but some differ across regions. Personal income taxation in Italy is progressive.

== Income tax ==
Employment income is subject to a progressive income tax, IRPEF (Imposta sul reddito delle persone fisiche) applying to all workers. The government sets the tax rate according to income, but the regions can add an additional 0.7 percent to 3.33 percent. In addition to the regional income tax, a municipal income tax can be levied which ranges from 0.1 percent to 0.9 percent. Municipalities can also establish progressive tax rates applicable to the national income bracket.

Starting from 2025 onwards, the new personal income tax rates were reformed and simplified by the Law n. 207/2024 as follows:

Income range	Tax rate
€0 – €28,000	23%
€28,000 – €50,000	35%
over €50,000	43%

Individuals are considered resident for tax purposes if for the greater part of the tax year they satisfy any of the following conditions:

- their habitual abode is in Italy,
- the centre of their vital interests is located in Italy, or
- they are registered at the Office of Records of the Resident Population in Italy.

=== Exemption Area ===
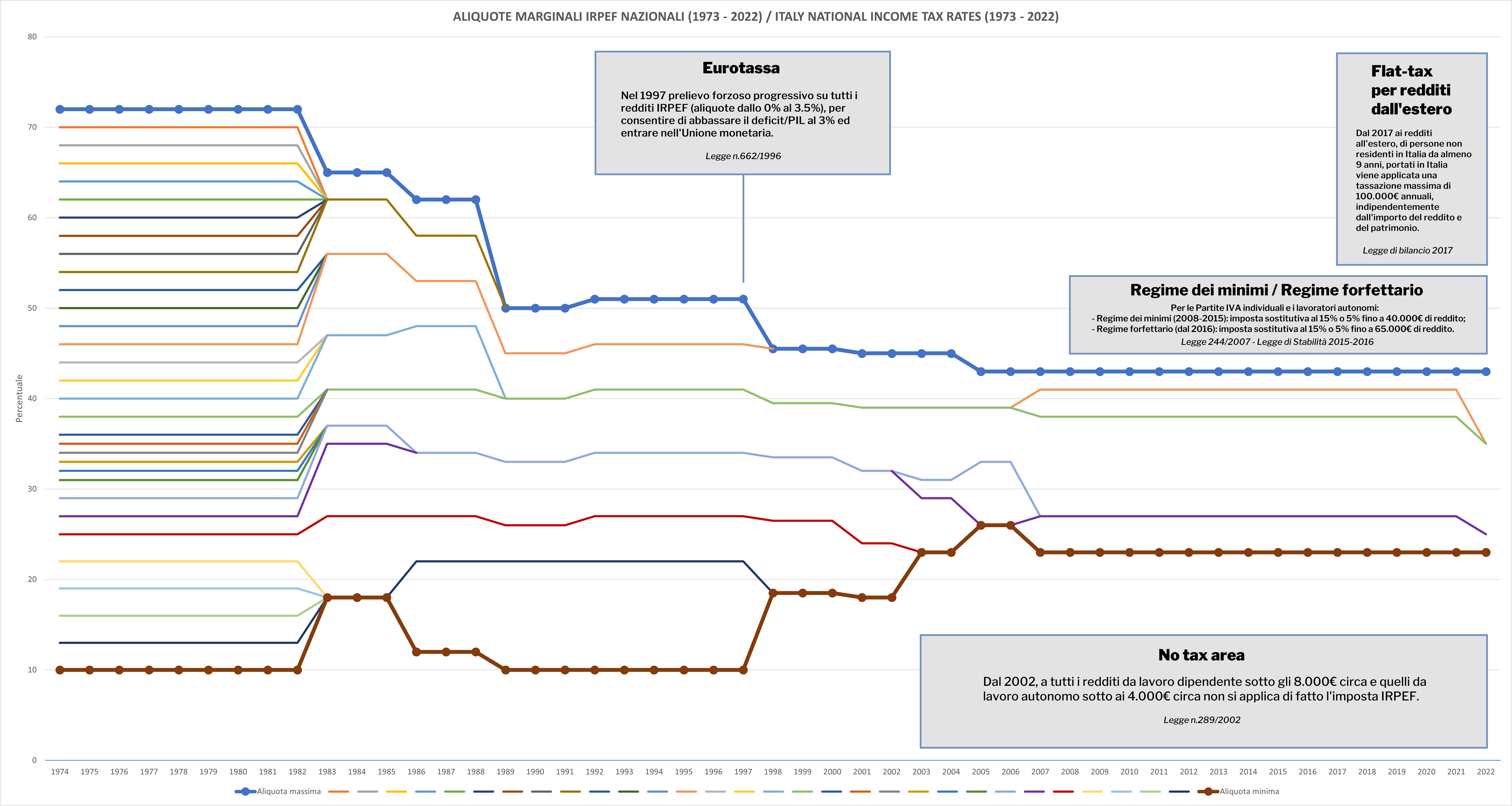
IRPEF tax from 1974 to 2022, with the temporal evolution of the rates and the various exceptions that have occurred at a national level over the years

Due to the different types of income, exemption from IRPEF is determined at:

- €8,000, for subordinate workers, if their employment period coincides with the entire year;
- €7,500, for pensioners under 75 years of age, if the pension is cashed in for the entire year, and for those receiving alimony from ex spouses;
- €7,750, for pensioners aged 75 or older, with a pension period that coincides with the whole year;
- €4,800, no matter how many days they work a year, for taxpayers with other types of income.

The area exempt from IRPEF increases further if there are dependent family members.

New residents of Italy are subject to a more favourable tax treatment on income taxes, providing they were not a tax resident of Italy in the past 24 months. Any taxpayer is entitled to a 70 percent exemption on the employment or self-employment income received for the first five years of tax residency to Italy; the exemption is increased to 90 percent if the taxpayer resides in a Southern region of Italy. The regime is extended for a further five years if the taxpayer meets any of the following conditions:

- has a family dependent of 18 years of age or less living in Italy
- purchases a residential property in Italy

== Corporate tax ==
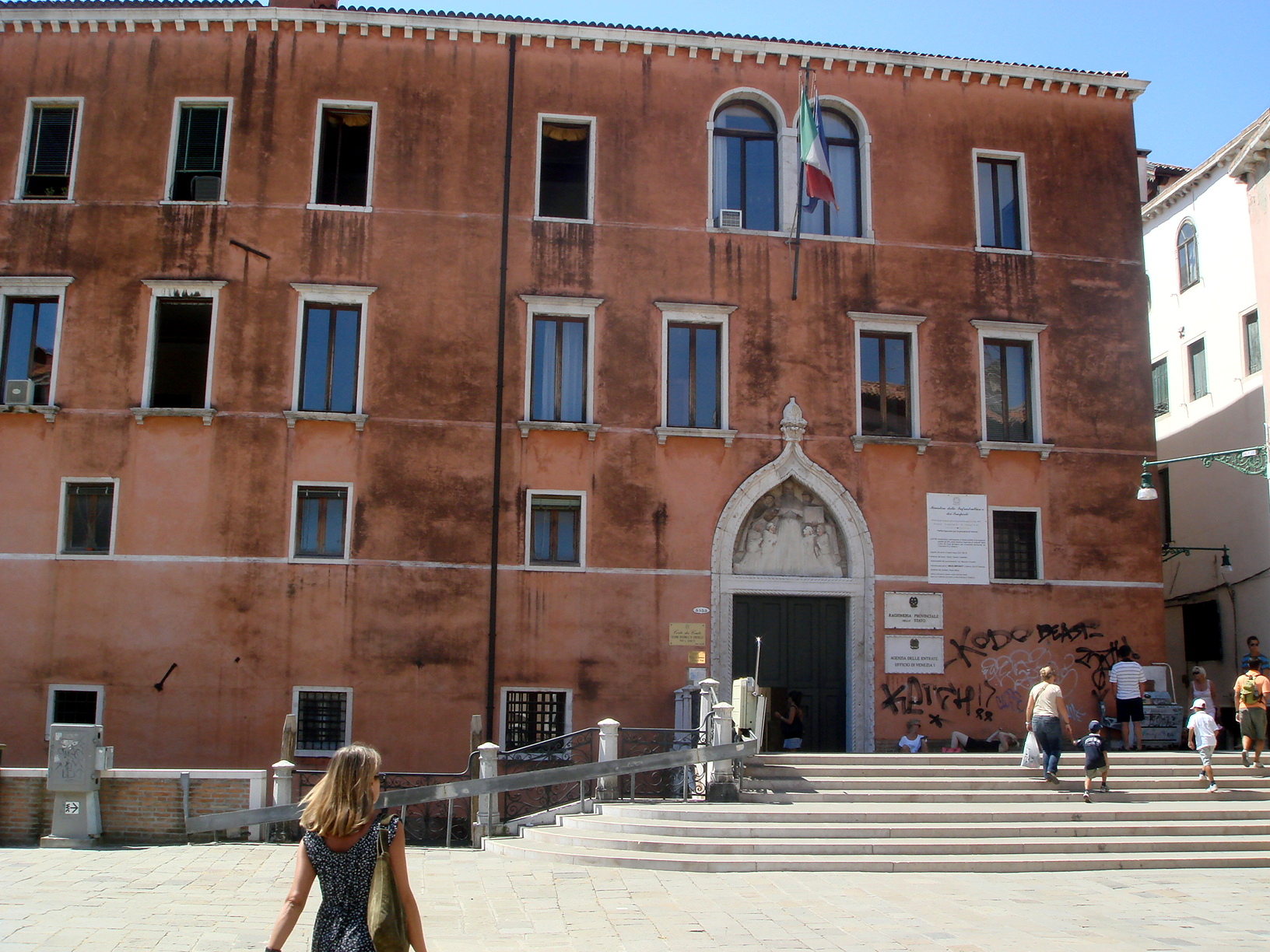
Italian Agency of Revenue building in Venice

Italian corporate entities are subject to Corporate Income Tax, IRES (Imposta sul reddito delle società) and to Regional Production Tax, IRAP (Imposta regionale sulle attività produttive). Italy has one of the highest rates of corporate tax – currently at 24 percent. Across the EU28, the average tax is 21.3 percent (2018).

- The rate of corporate income tax (IRES) since 1 January 2017 is 24 percent (previously it was 27.5 percent, and was at a maximum of 53.2 percent in 1981). Some corporations are exempted from corporate tax, such as charitable foundations, church institutions and sports clubs.
- The standard rate of regional tax (IRAP) is 3.9 percent, however regional authorities may increase or decrease the rate of standard tax by up to 0.92 percent. In addition, different IRAP rates are used to differentiate sectors of the economy in each region. For example, the rate for banks and other financial institutions is 5.57 percent in Abruzzo, Apulia, Lazio, Lombardy, Piedmont and Veneto, but only 4.65 percent in Emilia-Romagna). The tax is calculated differently from IRES, adding the cost of fixed-term workers (before 2016 the cost of every employee was counted). Up to 10% of regional tax (IRAP) is deductible in calculating the tax base for corporate income tax (IRES) purposes.

== Value added tax ==
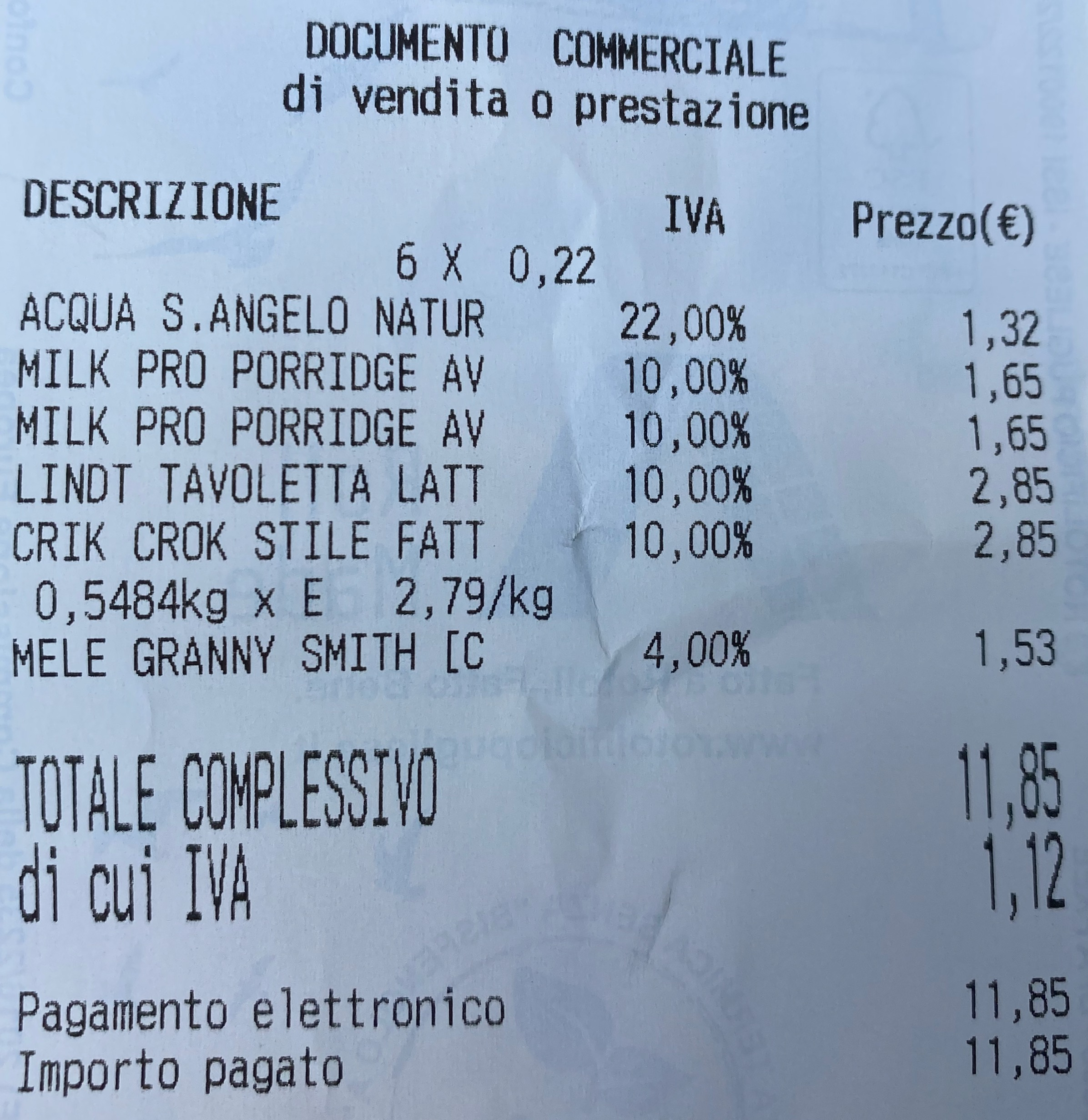
Supermarket receipt showing three categories of IVA

Value added tax or VAT, (in Italian Imposta sul valore aggiunto, or IVA) is a consumption tax charged at a standard rate of 22 percent, which came in on 1 July 2013 (previously 21 percent).

The first reduced VAT rate (10 percent) applies to water supplies, passenger transport, admission to cultural and sports events, hotels, restaurants and some foodstuff. The second reduced VAT rate (5 percent) applies to some foodstuff and social services. The super-reduced VAT rate (4 percent) applies to TV licenses, newspapers, periodicals, books and medical equipment for the disabled. A zero VAT rate (0 percent) applies to intra-community and international transport.

The filing deadline for VAT returns is 30 April of the next year.

== Social security ==
=== Employment relationship (staff) ===
Social security contributions apply to everyone in the workforce, divided into contributions by the employer and those by the employee; both sides are obliged to participate. Employers must register with the Italian Social Security Administration (Istituto Nazionale Previdenza Sociale or INPS). The total contribution rate fluctuates around 40 percent of the employee's wage, depending on their position in the company, on the number of employees in the company, and on the industrial sector of the company. Usually the contributions are apportioned as follows:

- around 30 percent is charged to the employer;
- around 10 percent is charged to the employee.

However, only 33 percent out of this 40 percent is used for INPS purposes; the rest is distributed into several other funds:

- unemployment fund;
- sickness fund (usage of this fund is not applicable for executives);
- maternity fund;
- temporary unemployment compensation fund (separated into ordinary and extraordinary compensation fund; usage of this fund is not applicable for executives);
- social mobility fund (usage of this fund is not applicable for executives);
- other minor funds.

The social security contribution, for employees who registered with INPS after 1 January 1996 without a previous social security position in Italy, is calculated and paid up to a maximum amount of €101,427 for the year 2018.

=== Employment relationship (executive) ===
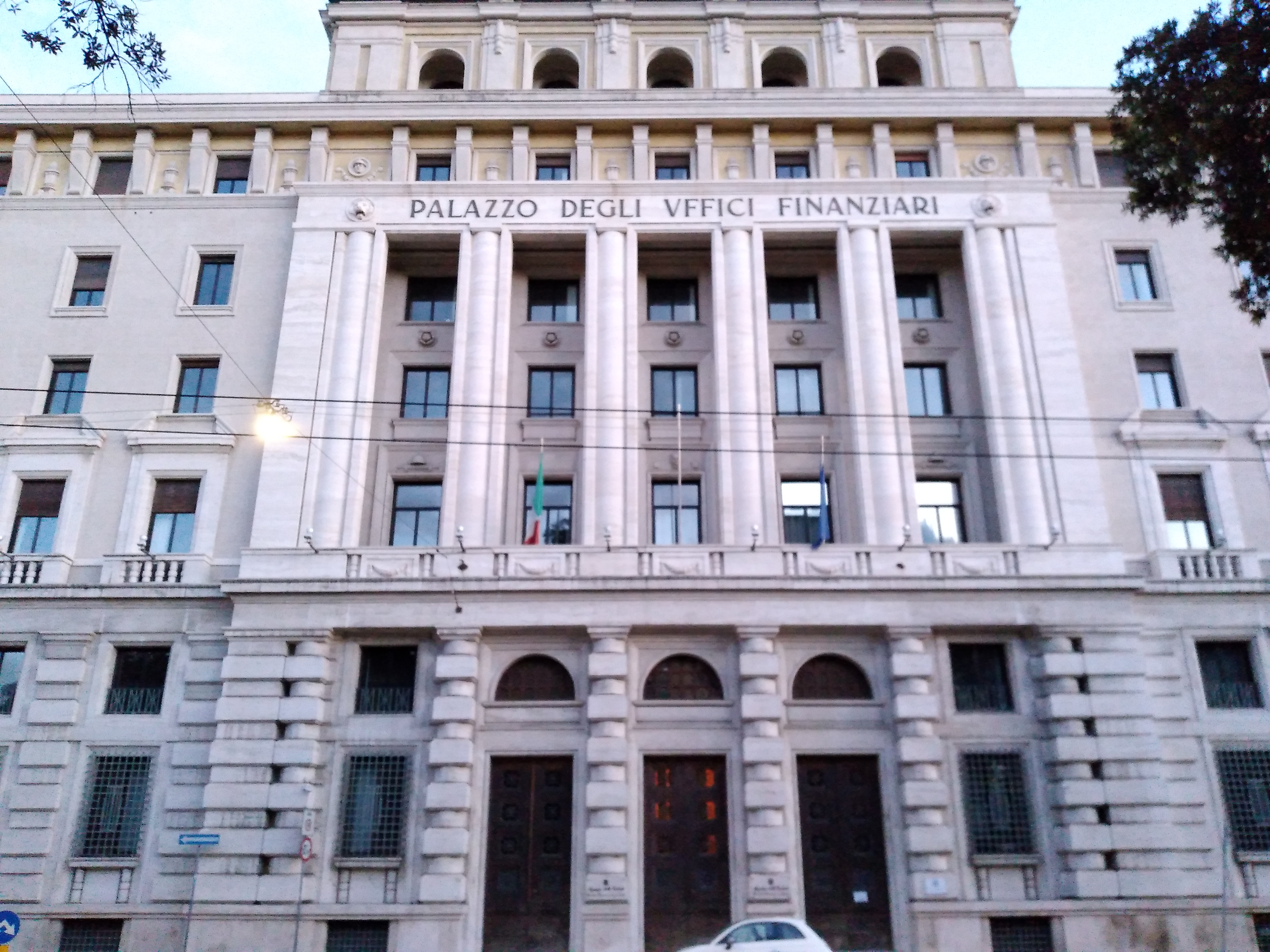
Italian Agency of Revenue building in Genoa

Social contributions due from commercial executives:

- For INPS, the tax level is 9.19 percent of income up to an income ceiling of €46,630. For higher income tax level is set at 10.19 percent of income.
- For Fondo Mario Negri – complementary pension fund tax level is 1 percent on a national annual income, and tax ceiling is €59,224.54 and maximally €129.12 yearly as training charges.
- For Fondo Mario Besusso – also known as FASDAC (Fondo Assistenza Sanitaria Dirigenti Aziende Commerciali), national medical fund, tax level is 1.87 percent of annual income with a yearly maximum €45,940.
- For Fondo Pastore – complementary pension fund; requirement to contribute at least €464.81. This fund consists of insurance and investment (not compulsory).

Social contributions due from industrial executives:

- For INPS tax level is 9.19 percent of income up to an income ceiling of amount €46,630. For higher income tax level is set at 10.19 percent of income.
- For Fondo Assistenza Sanitaria Industria or FASI, medical care fund, is set at a flat rate of €960.
- For Fondo Previdenza Dirienti Aziende industriali or PREVINDAI, additional pension fund, is set at a tax level of 4 percent of income only for those with maximum annual income €150,000.

=== Self-employment relationship ===
For self-employed individuals who are not VAT number holders and are not covered by a compulsory private pension fund is instituted law 335/95, and according to this individuals must register with INPS in a "separate social security regime". This system is provided for three different rates.

- For individuals enrolled in other mandatory security regimes, the tax level is 24 percent of annual income.
- For individuals with VAT number enrolled in exclusive way into Gestione separata INPS (separate social security regime) is tax level 25.72 percent.
- All others individuals enrolled in the exclusive way into the separate social security regime (Gestione separata INPS) differs on providing DIS-COLL. If DIS-COLL is not provided, the tax rate is 33.72 percent of income, and if DIS-COLL is provided, the tax rate is 34.23 percent.

All percentages equals to maximal limit of €101,427 established by law in 2017.

== Other taxes ==
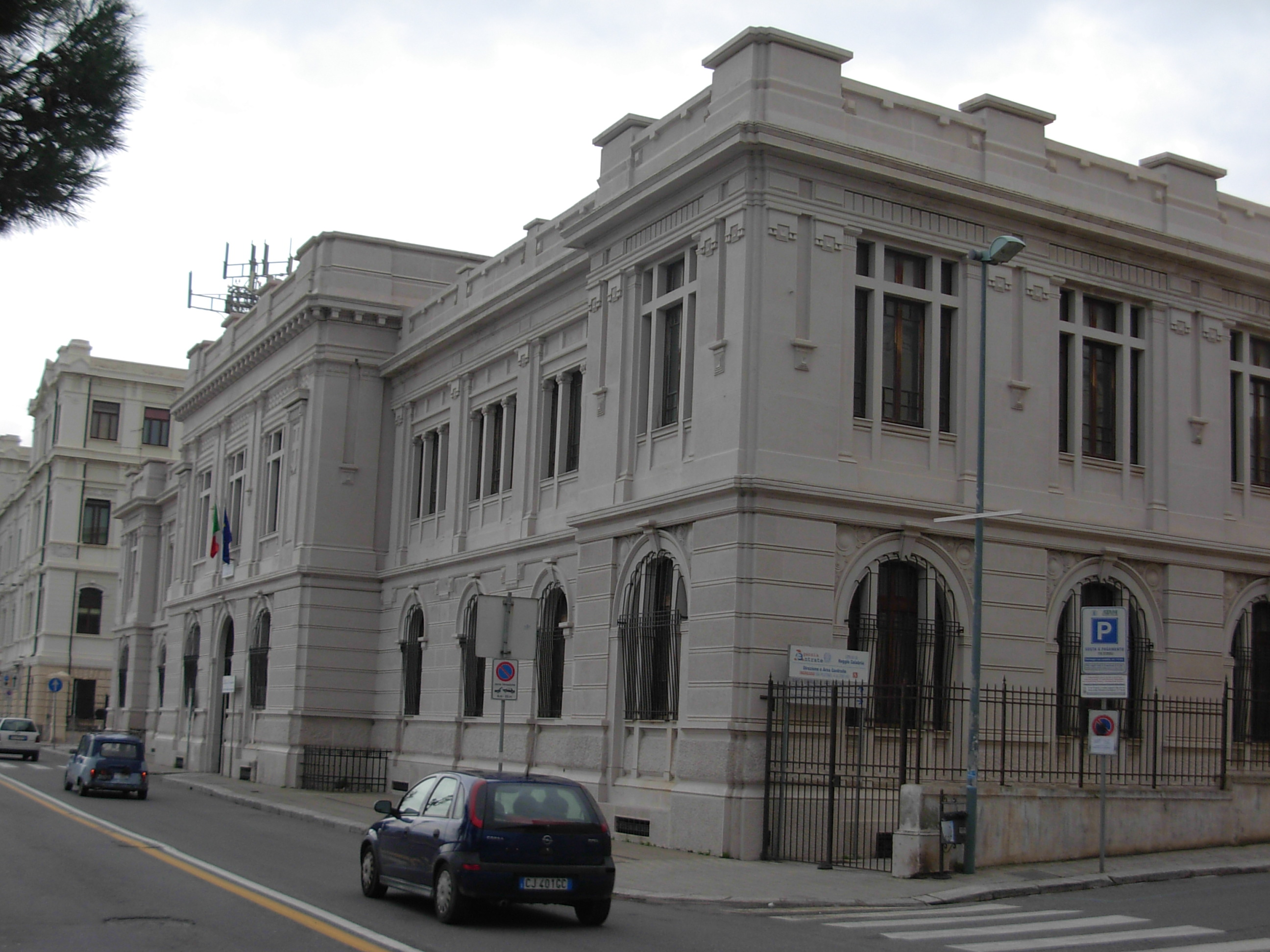
Italian Agency of Revenue building in Reggio Calabria

=== Wealth tax on real estate properties owned outside of Italy ===
The Italian wealth tax on real estate properties (Imposta sul valore degli immobile situati all'estero or IVIE) owned outside of Italy by an individual who qualifies as a resident for Italian tax purposes has been introduced in Italy. The wealth tax due is proportionate to the percentage owned and the size of the property. The applicable tax rate is equal to 0.76 percent. No IVIE is due if the tax is lower than €200; otherwise, the entire IVIE amount is due.

=== Wealth tax on financial investments owned outside of Italy ===
The Italian wealth tax on financial investments (Imposta sul valore delle Attivita Finanziarie detenute all` Estero or IVAFE) owned outside of Italy by an individual who qualifies as a resident for Italian tax purposes has been introduced in Italy. The wealth tax due is proportionate to the percentage owned and the size of the property. The applicable tax rate is equal to 0.2 percent for the year 2018. Only for bank accounts, the above-mentioned tax is a flat amount equal to €34.20 for each bank account. This flat amount is not due if the average saving amount is lower than €5,000, taking into consideration all the bank accounts owned by the taxpayer.

=== Inheritance, estate, and gift taxes ===
A tax on inheritance and donations was reintroduced in October 2006 after a five-year period during which this tax was abolished. The percentage and exemption limits applicable to transfers of money or assets depend on the beneficiary's relation with the deceased person or donor.

- the spouse or relatives in a direct line, the inheritance or donations tax is imposed at 4 percent on the value of the assets exceeding the tax-free threshold of €1 million (per heir)
- a sister and brother, the inheritance or donations tax is imposed at 6 percent on the value of the transfer exceeding €100,000 (per heir)
- other family members up to the fourth generation, the inheritance or donations tax is imposed at 6 percent on the entire value of the transfer, and
- all other beneficiaries not previously mentioned are subject to an 8 percent tax rate to be applied on the entire value of the transfer.

Shares and government bonds received as an inheritance are not taxed.

Specific provisions apply to a handicapped person.

=== Regional tax on productivity ===
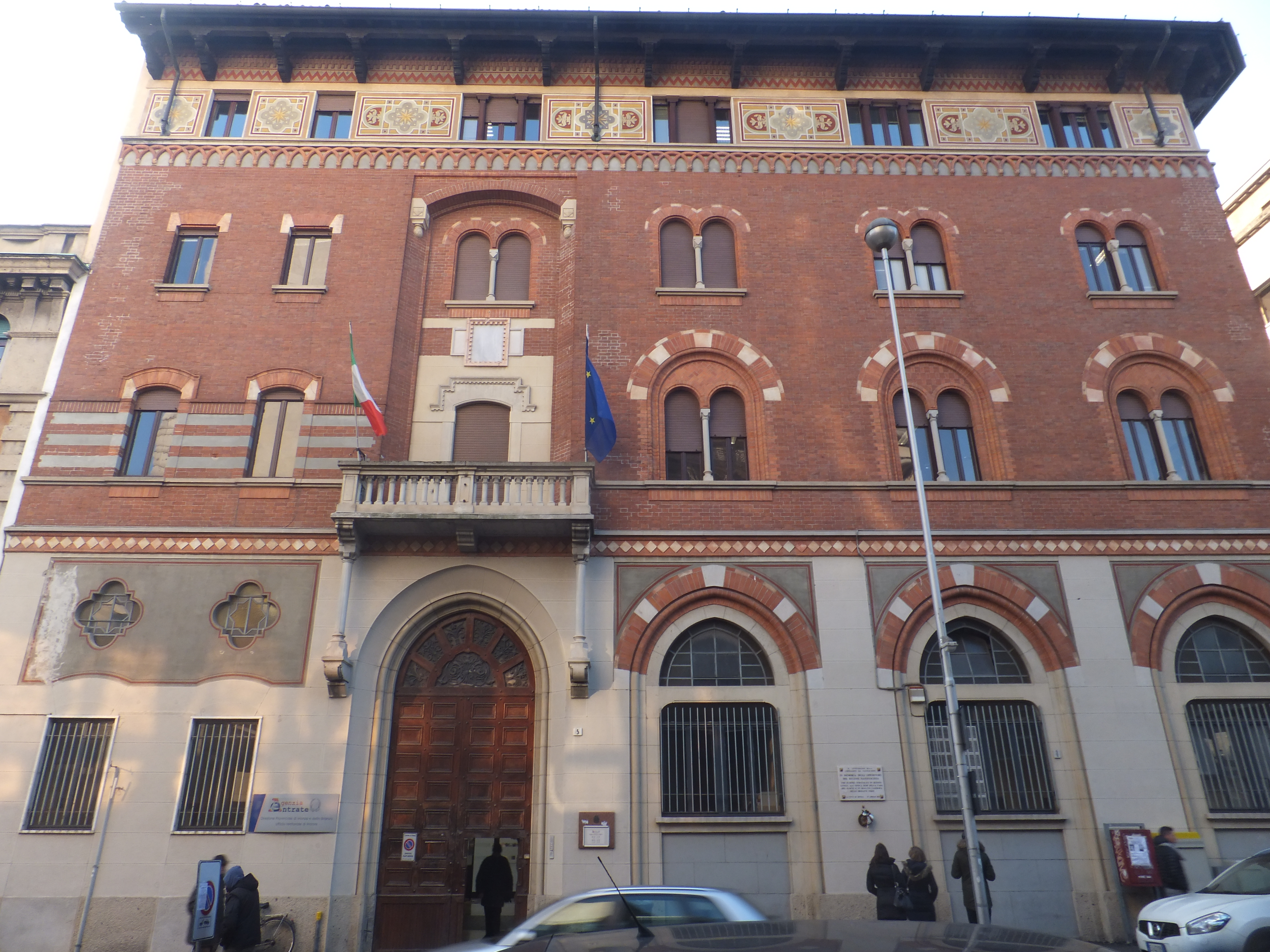
Italian Agency of Revenue building in Monza

The regional tax on productivity (IRAP) is applied at a flat rate up to 3.9 percent. This flat rate is applicable to the productive activity exercised. The taxable base is the difference between the compensation received and the direct business expenses, excluding any cost of personnel and interest.

=== Municipal taxes on real estate owned in Italy ===
The Italian Financial Bill for the year 2014 introduced relevant changes to the municipal tax on real estate owned in Italy. The tax law introduced a 'unique municipal tax' (Imposta municipale unica or IUC).

IUC is composed of three different taxes:

- Municipal tax (Imposta municipale propria or IMU);
- Garbage tax (Imposta sui rifiuti or TARI);
- Indivisible service tax (Imposta sui servizi indivisibili or TASI).

== Tax evasion and lack of guarantees ==
Italy has the largest number of "major tax evaders" in Europe, according to the estimated figures, tax evasion amounting to over €180 billion. Evasion is sometimes seen by evaders as the best way to ensure the right of defense from the alleged excessive tax claim of the State.

== See also ==
- Eight per thousand
