= Ministry of economy =

Types of ministries dealing with economy or economic policy

A Ministry of Economy, Ministry of Commerce, Ministry of Economic Affairs, or Department of Commerce is a part of the government in most countries that is responsible for matters related to the economy or economic policy.

== List ==
Examples of such ministries include:

- Afghanistan: Ministry of Economy (Afghanistan)
- Albania: Ministry of Economic Development, Trade and Entrepreneurship (Albania)
- Argentina: Minister of Economy of Argentina
- Austria: Ministry of Economy (Austria)
- Belarus: Ministry of Economy
- Benin: Ministry of Economy and Finance (Benin)
- Bulgaria: Ministry of Economy, Energy and Tourism (Bulgaria)
- Bhutan: Ministry of Economic Affairs (Bhutan)
- Brazil: Ministry of Economy (Brazil)
- Cambodia: Ministry of Economy and Finance (Cambodia)
- Chile: Ministry of Economy, Development and Tourism
- Croatia: Ministry of Economy (Croatia)
- Denmark: Ministry of Economic and Business Affairs (Denmark)
- Dominican Republic: Ministry of Economy (Dominican Republic)
- Estonia: Ministry of Economic Affairs and Communications
- Finland: Ministry of Economic Affairs and Employment (Finland)
- France: Ministry of the Economy and Finance (France)
- Georgia: Ministry of Economy and Sustainable Development (Georgia)
- Germany: Federal Ministry for Economic Affairs and Energy
- Greece: Ministry of National Economy and Finance (Greece)
- Guatemala: Ministry of Economy (Guatemala)
- Iran: Ministry of Economic Affairs and Finance (Iran)
- Israel: Ministry of Economy (Israel)
- Italy: Ministry of Economy and Finance (Italy)
- Japan: Ministry of Economy, Trade and Industry
- Kazakhstan: Ministry of National Economy (Kazakhstan)
- Latvia: Ministry of Economics (Latvia)
- Lithuania: Ministry of Economy (Lithuania)
- Malaysia: Ministry of Economic Affairs
- Malta: Ministry for the Economy, Investment and Small Business
- Moldova: Ministry of Economy and Infrastructure (Moldova)
- Netherlands: Ministry of Economic Affairs (Netherlands)
- Palestine: Ministry of National Economy (Palestine)
- Peru: Ministry of Economy and Finance (Peru)
- Philippines: Department of Economy, Planning, and Development
- Poland: Ministry of Economy (Poland)
- Portugal: Ministry of Economy (Portugal)
- Romania: Ministry of Economy, Commerce and Business Environment (Romania)
- Saudi Arabia: Ministry of Economy and Planning
- South Korea: Ministry of Economy and Finance (South Korea)
- Spain: Ministry of Economy and Finance (Spain)
- Syria: Ministry of Economy and Trade (Syria)
- Tanzania: Ministry of Finance and Economic Affairs (Tanzania)
- Taiwan: Ministry of Economic Affairs (Taiwan)
- Turkey: Ministry of Economy (Turkey)
- Ukraine: Ministry of Economy (Ukraine)
- United Kingdom: HM Treasury
- United States: United States Department of Commerce
- Uzbekistan: Ministry of Economy and Finance (Uzbekistan)
- Zimbabwe: Ministry of Economic Planning and Investment Promotion (Zimbabwe)

== See also ==
- Ministry of Economy and Finance (disambiguation)
- Ministry of Economic Development (disambiguation)
- Finance minister
- Commerce minister
