= Ministry of Economy and Finance =

Ministry of Economy and Finance or Ministry of Finance and Economy may refer to:

- Ministry of Economy and Finance (Benin)
- Ministry of Finance and Economy (Brunei)
- Ministry of Economy and Finance (Cambodia)
- Ministry of Economy and Finance (Ecuador)
- Ministry of the Economy and Finance (France)
- Ministry of Economy and Finance (Haiti)
- Ministry of Economy and Finance (Italy)
- Ministry of Economy and Finance (Ivory Coast)
- Ministry of Economy and Finance (Peru)
- Ministry of Economy and Finance (South Korea)
- Ministry of Economy and Finance (Spain)

== See also ==
- Ministry of Finance
- Ministry of the economy
