= 2005 Italian centre-left primary election =

- 16 October 2005
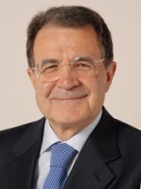

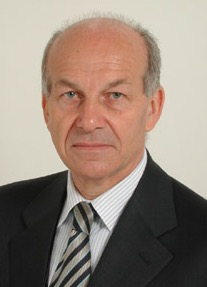

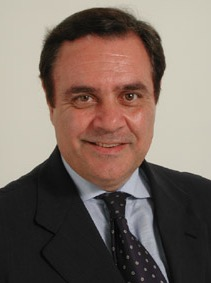
Nominee	Romano Prodi	Fausto Bertinotti	Clemente Mastella
Party	The Olive Tree	PRC	UDEUR
Popular vote	3,182,686	631,592	196,014
Percentage	74.17%	14.69%	4.56%
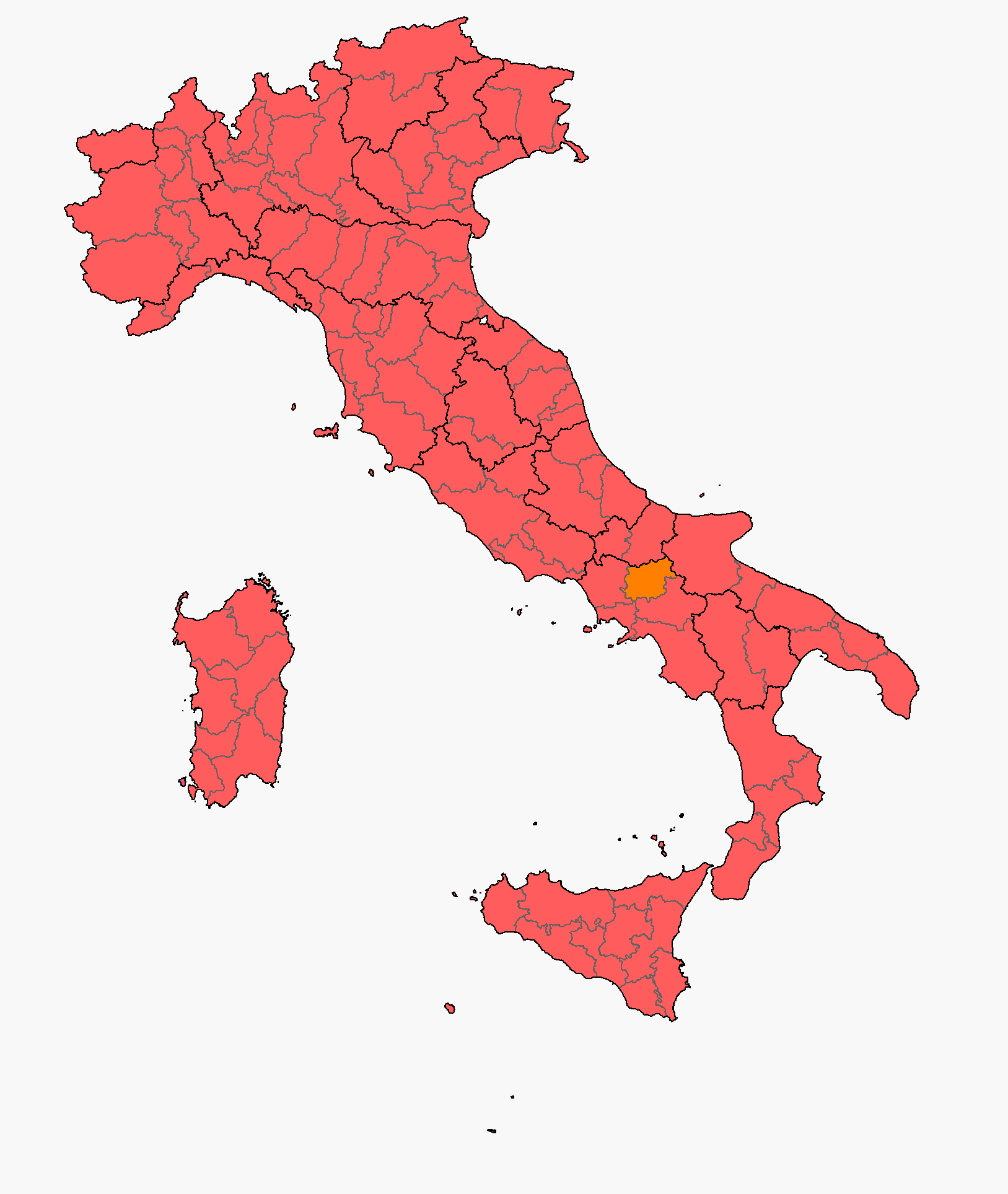
- Primary election results map. Pink denotes provinces with a Prodi plurality, Orange denotes provinces with a Mastella plurality.

The 2005 Italian centre-left primary election determined the leader of the coalition The Union, who will stand as common candidate for the office of Prime Minister in the subsequent general election, which took place on 9–10 April 2006. It was won with 74% of the votes by Romano Prodi.

== Historical background ==
As of 2005, the coalition was assumed to be led by Romano Prodi, however he called for a primary election in order to gain an official leadership. Primary elections were a novelty in Italian politics, as the proportional system in place until the early 1990s was supposed to present sufficient variety to electors. With the new majoritarian electoral system, two clear blocks emerged since 1996.

Primary elections had never been held on a national level before in Italy, and only once at a regional level, in Apulia: in that occasion, Nichi Vendola, a communist and gay Catholic, became the candidate for the centre-left coalition in a region reputed to be conservative and with deep religious roots. The institute of primary election came under criticism from some centre-left moderates, as in their opinion it had produced a useless candidate doomed to failure. However, Vendola's victory against the incumbent governor and centre-right candidate Raffaele Fitto, a much more conventional and moderate young man, vindicated the primary elections in the internal argumentations of The Union.

== Candidates ==
When the primary elections were first proposed, they were mostly meant as a plebiscite for Romano Prodi, since there were no other candidates to the leadership of the coalition. The secretary of the Communist Refoundation Party, Fausto Bertinotti, then announced he would run for the leadership, even if only to act as a symbolic candidate, to avoid a one-candidate election. After some time, more candidates were presented.

The primary election may have been foreseen an easy win for Prodi, with the other candidates running mostly to "measure their strengths" in the coalition, and they often talked about reaching a certain percentage rather than winning. However, there were rumours of supporters of the House of Freedoms trying to participate in the elections, and vote in favour of Clemente Mastella, reputed to be the least competent of the candidates and the least likely to win against Berlusconi, other than the most centrist; other rumours indicated such "fake" left-wing voters would vote for Bertinotti, because his leadership would likely lose any grip on the political centre.

Portrait	Name	Details and notes
	Romano Prodi	Leader of The Olive Tree; Former Prime Minister of Italy; Former President of the European Commission; Former minister in Giulio Andreotti IV Cabinet
	Fausto Bertinotti	Secretary of the Communist Refoundation Party; Member of the Chamber of Deputies
	Clemente Mastella	Leader of UDEUR; Member of the Chamber of Deputies; Former minister in Silvio Berlusconi I Cabinet
	Antonio Di Pietro	Leader of Italy of Values; Member of the Chamber of Deputies; Former minister in Romano Prodi I Cabinet
	Alfonso Pecoraro Scanio	Leader of Federation of the Greens; Member of the Chamber of Deputies; Former minister in Giuliano Amato I Cabinet
	Ivan Scalfarotto	LGBT activist
	Simona Panzino	Anti-globalization activist

== Results ==
The primary election had been held nationwide on 16 October 2005, from 8 a.m. to 10 p.m. The primary election was open to all Italian citizens who were at least 18 during the following general election, plus regular immigrants who have lived in Italy for three years (immigrants still do not have the opportunity to vote for any other election in Italy), against a payment of (at least) 1 euro, charged to cover organisational expenses. Poll stations were mainly managed on a voluntary basis; they were hosted mainly in squares, local party quarters, schools, and even restaurants, bars, campers and a hairdresser; some polling stations were also provided outside the country for Italians abroad. Most of the party leaders claimed a result of 1 million voters would be a good success for the election. The total count was in excess of 4,300,000.

Candidates	Parties		
Candidates	Parties	Votes	%
Romano Prodi	The Olive Tree (L'Ulivo)	3,182,686	74.17
Fausto Bertinotti	Communist Refoundation Party (PRC)	631,592	14.69
Clemente Mastella	Union of Democrats for Europe (UDEUR)	196,014	4.56
Antonio Di Pietro	Italy of Values (IdV)	142,143	3.28
Alfonso Pecoraro Scanio	Federation of the Greens (FdV)	95,388	2.22
Ivan Scalfarotto	Independent	26,912	0.62
Simona Panzino	Independent	19,752	0.46
Total		4,294,487	100

Popular vote
Prodi	74.17%
Bertinotti	14.69%
Mastella	4.46%
Di Pietro	3.28%
Pecoraro Scanio	2.22%
Scalfarotto	0.62%
Panzino	0.46%

== Political reactions ==
Most reactions on the centre-left were comprehensibly enthusiastic, especially because of the high number of participants. Clemente Mastella, however, accused the organization of rigging the election and having pre-printed ballots in favour of Prodi.

On the centre-right, two main attitudes were held: some respected or even hailed the election, others contested its validity and characterised them as propaganda.

- Silvio Berlusconi said the primary elections "are the only way they can win";
- Gianfranco Fini expressed respect for voters, but suggested, on the basis of Mastella's claims, that the results may have been rigged;
- Roberto Maroni from the Lega Nord said that the elections "deserve respect in any case, but will not solve the centre-left's internal contradictions";
- Roberto Castelli, minister of justice, stigmatised the elections as a "perfect example of Soviet-style political campaign: there is no certification of the data purported by the centre-left, and knowing their methods they are certainly inflated".
- The Union of Christian and Centre Democrats expressed the most positive judgements from the centre-right, and Bruno Tabacci called for primary elections in the centre-right too, following tensions between his party and Berlusconi, no longer felt to be a strong candidate.

== Controversies ==
=== Allegations of fraud by Mastella ===
Clemente Mastella claimed, already on the election day, that too few ballots had been provided in areas where his party is stronger, and that several pre-marked voting papers, pre-marked with votes for Prodi, have been prepared in order to let him lose. No one other than Mastella backed up these claims inside the coalition, and material evidence was not presented.

=== Murder of Francesco Fortugno ===
Francesco Fortugno, vice-president of the Council of Calabria and member of The Daisy (DL), was murdered on 16 October 2005 by two killers when he was waiting in line to vote in a polling station in Locri. The act was assumed to have political significance since the murderers killed him on a political occasion and with dozens of witnesses. The administration Fortugno was a part of had previously removed many administrators, and some saw this murder as an act of retribution from the 'Ndrangheta against Agazio Loiero's administration.
