= Digitalization =

Digitalization or digitalisation may refer to:

- Digital transformation, the adoption of digital tools to create new or modify existing products, services and operations.
- Digitization, the conversion of analog information into a digital format
- Medical use of Digoxin
- Medical use of other Digitalis-based drugs

== See also ==
- Digital (disambiguation)
- Quantization (disambiguation)
- Digitation
