= Matteo Hallissey =

Italian politician (born 2003)

President of More Europe
- Incumbent
- Assumed office 9 February 2025
- Preceded by: Emma Bonino

President of Italian Radicals
- Incumbent
- Assumed office 8 December 2024
- Preceded by: Patrizia de Grazia

Secretary of Italian Radicals
- In office 28 January 2024 – 8 December 2024
- Preceded by: Massimiliano Iervolino
- Succeeded by: Filippo Blengino

Personal details
- Born: 5 April 2003 (age 23) Bologna, Italy
- Party: Italian Radicals; More Europe
- Occupation: Politician

Matteo Hallissey (born 5 April 2003) is an Italian politician who is the president of More Europe since 9 February 2025 and president of the Italian Radicals since 8 December 2024. Previously, he was secretary of the Italian Radicals from 28 January to 8 December 2024. In doing so, he became the youngest secretary of an Italian political party. Hallissey is well known for his activism related to liberal reforms of the taxi and beach resort sectors, which attracted international attention.

== Early life ==
Hallissey was born on 5 April 2003 in Bologna, the capital and largest city of the Emilia-Romagna region. His mother is from Rome while his father is English. Hallissey grew up in Monterenzio. He attended the liceo scientifico in Bologna named after Nicolaus Copernicus and enrolled in the Faculty of Political Science at the University of Bologna.

== Political career ==
As a youth, Hallissey was associated with Liberi Oltre le Illusioni and EconomiaItalia. His political activism began in 2021 during the collection of signatures for the referendum on euthanasia promoted by the Luca Coscioni Association and some political parties, including the Italian Radicals and More Europe, both of which he joined. In December 2022, he ran for secretary of the Italian Radicals for the first time, obtaining 118 votes, 18 fewer than the 136 votes in favour of the secretary Massimiliano Iervolino, who was re-elected. In 2023, he was elected member of the National Assembly of More Europe in the motion supporting the candidacy of Riccardo Magi, who was then elected secretary of the party.

In January 2024, having run again as secretary of the Italian Radicals, Hallissey was elected, becoming the youngest secretary of a political party in Italy. He held the position until 8 December 2024, when at the 23th congress of the party held in Turin, having chose not run again for the position of secretary, he was elected president while Filippo Blengino succeeded him as secretary. Between summer and autumn 2024, Hallissey became known on social networks for his protest initiatives for the economic liberalisation of taxi concessions and beach resorts. For this reason, he was often insulted or assaulted during his demonstrations. His support for Ukraine in the Russo-Ukrainian war also earned him attacks from pro-Vladimir Putin and pro-Russia individuals and organisations, including the Russian embassy in Italy.

In the 2024 Emilia-Romagna regional election held on 17–18 November, Hallissey ran within the list Reformists for a Future Emilia-Romagna, which supported the centre-left coalition candidate Michele De Pascale as president of Emilia-Romagna, achieving 1,750 preferential votes in the Bologna constituency and resulting in the most voted of the list, although it did not obtain any seats. In January 2025, he took part in the fourth congress of More Europe presenting the motion Eretika! and was elected president of the party, beating the former secretary Benedetto Della Vedova and succeeding Emma Bonino.

In April 2026, as president of More Europe, Hallissey presented a motion that called for a new party congress. In the following months, together with Della Vedova, he continued to clash with Magi, who by this time had ended up in the minority, pushing for the convening of a new congress. In September 2026, the party's National Assembly voted 52–34 to call an early congress for December; however, the decision was contested by 45 members who formally urged Hallissey not to convene it, citing the party's statutes.

== Political positions and activism ==
During his career, Hallissey focused much of his political activity on initiatives related to the liberalisation of services and greater market competition. In particular, he expressed support for a reform of the taxi sector, denouncing the shortage of licences and organising demonstrations, such as the "free taxi" service, to attract public attention. Another area at the centre of his campaigns was the beach concessions. Through raids and demonstrations on the beaches, he denounced the absence of public tenders and the concentration of the beaches in the hands of a few operators, asking for the application of the Bolkestein directive.

Hallissey's initiatives attracted media attention and provoked mixed reactions. While criticised by trade representatives, supporters and observers more positively considered his actions as an attempt to pursue battles for transparency and competition in the sectors concerned. In addition to these issues, Hallissey advocated pro-European positions, promoting a strengthening of community institutions and greater political and economic integration. He called for the expansion of civil rights, with particular attention to battles for equality and against discrimination. He also supported anti-prohibitionist initiatives, in particular for the legalisation of cannabis, believing that the regulatory framework had produced effects contrary to the declared objectives.
