= Italian electoral law of 2026 =

2026 Italian law

Italian Electoral Law of 2026

Italian Parliament
- Long title: Regarding elections to the Chamber of Deputies and the Senate of the Republic
- Enacted by: Chamber of Deputies
- Enacted by: Senate of the Republic
- Signed by: Sergio Mattarella
- Signed: 9 October 2026

Legislative history

Initiating chamber: Chamber of Deputies
- Passed: 8 October 2026
- Voting summary: 227 voted for; 164 voted against

Revising chamber: Senate of the Republic
- Passed: 15 September 2026
- Voting summary: 113 voted for; 71 voted against

Amends
- Presidential Decree n. 361 of 1957
- Status: In force

The Italian electoral law of 2026, colloquially known by the nickname Melonellum after prime minister Giorgia Meloni or Stabilicum after its intended goal of providing for stable governments, is a jackpot type mixed majoritarian electoral system. The Chamber of Deputies and Senate of the Republic both use the same type of system, with only minor differences. On 8 October 2026, the Chamber of Deputies gave its final approval to a new electoral law, repealing the Rosatellum of 2017.

== History ==
On 8 October 2026, the Italian Parliament approved a new electoral law. Opposition parties are expected to challenge the law in court, arguing that the majority bonus distorts voter representation.

== Main characteristics and operation ==
The 400 seats in the Chamber of Deputies and 200 seats in the Senate are allocated through a conditional majority jackpot system. The condition for being awarded the jackpot of 220 seats in the Chamber and 113 in the Senate is that a coalition is 1) in first-place according to their national vote share in the popular vote for both the Chamber and the Senate and 2) that it achieved at least 42% of popular vote for both the Chamber and the Senate. Otherwise, the system works as a proportional representation system.

=== Jackpot ===
The political coalition or party that fulfils the conditions to be declared winner receives a bonus of 70 seats in the Chamber of Deputies and 35 seats in the Senate, to ensure a parliamentary majority. To avoid excessively large parliamentary majority, there is a cap on the bonus majority so that the winner does not get more than 220 seats in the Chamber and 113 in the Senate, not including the overseas constituencies.

To qualify for the majority bonus, each party or coalition must also indicate its candidate for Prime Minister and its common program at the time of registration. As the President of Italy appoints the Prime Minister, this designation is not legally binding, and the name of candidate for Prime Minister will not appear on the ballot.

=== Proportional representation ===
If no coalitions or parties reach the threshold of 42%, the seats are distributed in a purely proportional manner. There is a threshold to enter parliament, set at 10% for coalitions and 3% for parties. Within a coalition, the best-performing party that falls below the 3% threshold would also receive seats.

The proportional allocation of seats follows the Hare quota and largest remainder method.

In this system, voters can express preferences in a hybrid system: the list leaders are fixed in place (closed list), but voters can express up to three preferences out of six remaining names in the ballot (open list), with gender alternation; if preferences are expressed without alternating between candidates' gender, the preferential vote is void. Unlike the previous Rosatellum law, where, of the total number of list leaders, no gender can be represented by more than 60%, there is no such requirement in the current system. However, of the total number of candidates submitted by a coalition, no gender can be represented by more than 60%.

=== Overseas constituencies ===
8 members of the Chamber and 4 members of the Senate are elected by voters abroad. The distribution of these seats is independent of (parallel to) the bonus and proportional proportional representation seats. The number of overseas constituencies for the Chamber is reduced from 4 to 2, and in the Senate a single overseas constituency replaces the four single-seat districts.

== Previous systems ==
=== Rosatellum (2017–2026) ===
As a consequence of the result of the 2016 Italian constitutional referendum, in which the Senate reform was rejected, the two chambers of the Italian Parliament ended up with two different electoral laws, which lacked uniformity. As a matter of fact, the electoral law for the Chamber of Deputies passed by Matteo Renzi's government, the so-called Italicum, based on a strong winner-take-all principle, was still in effect, whereas in the Senate a pure proportional system (the remnants of the so-called Porcellum, the electoral law approved by the cabinet of Silvio Berlusconi in 2005 and then declared extensively unconstitutional by the Constitutional Court in January 2014) was in force. The two systems differed on several aspects, among which the possibility of forming coalitions before the elections (only allowed at the Senate) and the election thresholds. After few weeks Ettore Rosato, the leader of the group of the Democratic Party at the Chamber of Deputies, proposed a new bill based on a mixed system, with half of the seats allocated using the first-past-the-post and the other half using a proportional allocation. The bill was not popular in its original version, since several opposition parties considered the number of seats allocated with the FPTP system too high. A later and revised version of the Rosatellum, known as Rosatellum bis was approved by PD, FI, LN, AP and ALA in October 2017, becoming the new electoral law for both the houses of the Parliament.

==== Main characteristics and operation ====
The national elections use a mixed single vote into a parallel voting system, with 36.8̅2̅5̅3̅9̅7̅% of seats allocated using a first-past-the-post electoral system and 63.1̅7̅4̅6̅0̅3̅% using a proportional method (the latter including the seats allocated to Italians abroad), with one round of voting. The Senate and the Chamber of Deputies do not differ in the way the proportional seats are allocated, both using the largest remainder method of allocating seats.

For both the Senate and the Chamber, the district winners and the party preferences are selected on a single ballot (one for the Senate and one for the Chamber). The ballot includes the district's member, on a purely plurality basis and the parties and party-lists were listed that supported him, which was used to determine the proportional seats, with a 3% minimum threshold for party representation. The complicated mechanism known as scorporo, which was used to tabulate PR votes in the Mattarellum, was abolished in the new electoral law.

The ballot, which is a single one for the first-past-the-post and the proportional systems, shows the names of the candidates to single-member constituencies and, in close conjunction with them, the symbols of the linked lists for the proportional part, each one with a list of the relative candidates. In an effort to mitigate fragmentation, split-ticket voting was not allowed. The law also re-introduced a closed list system for the party lists on the second ballot, i.e., excluding voters from the decision as to which members of that party would enter parliament, thereby guaranteeing reelection of party leaders whose popular support was rapidly declining (new elections were to be held once the new electoral law was fully implemented).

==== Adaptation to constitutional reform ====
Law 51/2019 was meant to adapt the Rosatellum to a reduction of the number of seats in both houses of the Italian Parliament. It became law on 26 June 2019. It has been called a riformina elettorale, or little electoral reform. A constitutional amendment procedure was initiated during the 18th legislature by the Five Stars Movement, to cut the size of both houses by more than a third (from 630 and 315 members, to 400 and 200). To avoid incompatibility with the proposed amendment, the 2019 law adapts the Rosatellum law, and sets fractions for each type of seat (proportional or majoritary) instead of exact numbers. The ratio of single-winner districts over the total number of seats in Rosatellum was equal to 3/8 in both houses, and the law 51/2019 retains those proportions. Besides the Five Stars Movement, the law was supported by Lega and was opposed by the Democratic Party, until it joined the Conte II Cabinet in August 2019.

=== Italicum (2015–2017) ===
The Italian electoral law of 2015, better known as Italicum, a name given to it in 2014 by the Democratic Party secretary and subsequently head of government Matteo Renzi, who was its main proponent (until the end of January 2015 with the support of Forza Italia's leader Silvio Berlusconi) provides for a two-round system based on party-list proportional representation (the former being ruled out as unconstitutional), corrected by a majority bonus and a 3% election threshold. Candidates run for election in 100 multi-member constituencies with open lists, except for a single candidate chosen by each party who is the first to be elected.

The law, which came into force on 1 July 2016, regulates the election of the Chamber of Deputies, replacing the previous electoral law of 2005, modified by the Constitutional Court in December 2013 after judging it partly unconstitutional. The law was written under the assumption that, by the time it came into force, the upper house would have become an indirectly elected body representing regions, with greatly reduced powers, thus making a reform of its electoral system unnecessary. The upper-house reform, rejected in the 4 December 2016 Constitutional Referendum, was originally assumed to be adopted without a Referendum by 1 July 2016. It is the first electoral law approved by the Italian Parliament but never used in a general election.

==== History ====
On 4 December 2013, the Constitutional Court judged the electoral law of 2005 partly unconstitutional: in particular, its unlimited majority bonus was repealed. This made an electoral reform ever more urgent, since proportional representation without majoritarian correction is thought to be incompatible with the competitive party system of Italy. On 8 December 2013, Matteo Renzi became the new leader of the Democratic Party. In his victory speech, he vowed to change the electoral law against the risk of "stabilized grand coalitions". Renzi's initiative ultimately led to him taking Letta's place as the prime minister. Finally, Renzi made a deal with Silvio Berlusconi for a set of institutional reforms, including a new majority-assuring law based on a two-round system, conceived to make the event of a forced Grand Coalition impossible. The bill still faced harsh opposition, even from members of the proposing parties: however it was approved by the Chamber of Deputies on 12 March 2014 and, in an amended form, by the Senate on 27 January 2015 with the support of a large majority. The bill was finally approved on 4 May 2015 and signed by President Mattarella two days later.

==== Main characteristics and operation ====
The Italicum system regulated the attribution of 617 of the 630 seats of the Chamber of Deputies, excluding 12 seats attributed to representatives of Italians living abroad, and one seat for the Aosta Valley region. An uncommon feature of this system is that it is majority assuring, thanks to a jackpot that is assigned to the winning party, possibly after a second electoral round.

The territory of Italy was divided into 100 constituencies electing between 3 and 9 deputies depending on their size. For each constituency, the parties designate a list of candidates: "head of list" candidates can run in up to 10 constituencies, while other candidates are limited to a single constituency. Gender balance is promoted by requiring that, in each region, head of lists of either sex for the same party should not exceed 60% of the total; additionally, candidates in all lists must be in a sequence alternating by gender.

At the first round, electors would have received a ballot allowing them to vote for a single party and for its head of list candidate (pre-printed on the ballot), and are given the option to express up to two additional preference votes for other candidates of that party, by writing their name next to the party symbol. If two preference votes are expressed, they must be of a different sex: otherwise, the second preference is discarded. Only parties passing a 3% minimum threshold in the first round were to be assigned seats. If the party receiving the plurality of the votes passes a 40% threshold, it was to be attributed a minimum of 340 seats (54%). The remaining seats were allocated to the other parties in a proportional fashion, and no second round takes place.

If no party has been able to pass the 40% threshold, a second round takes place two weeks after the first one: this time electors receive a ballot where they are allowed to choose between the two parties that received most votes in the first round. The party winning the second round is attributed 340 seats, and the remaining 277 seats are allocated to the other parties in a proportional fashion, according to the results of the first round. The proportional allocation of seats follows the largest remainder method. Each party receives a certain number of seats depending on its national result: these seats are then projected onto the 100 constituencies and attributed to the candidates of that constituency, starting from the head of list and then according to the number of preference votes.

==== Constitutional review ====
On February 24, 2016 a court in Messina sent the election law for review to the Constitutional Court: declaring admissible the application by petitioners, the judges called for the Constitutional Court to decide whether eight out of the petitioners' 13 claims that the Italicum breached the Italian Constitution. The Constitutional Court might still decide that the unconstitutionality hypothesis is not founded, and even refuse to examine it. The court's decision is not expecting until after 2017 January. A constitutional reform bill passed by the Italian Parliament in April 2016, which is still awaiting popular confirmation by referendum, will require the Constitutional Court to decide on the constitutional legitimacy of the electoral law even if the aforementioned application is rejected. This extraordinary procedure will only take place if the referendum confirms the bill.

=== Porcellum (2005–2015) ===
The previous electoral law had a series of thresholds to encourage parties to form coalitions. It replaced the scorporo electoral system which had been introduced in the 1990s. The attempt to change the law with the referendum failed, and was the Constitutional Court, the judgment no. 1 of 2014, to eliminate various unconstitutional elements that were part of the law. The block voting system is nationwide-based for the House, and regional-based for the Senate. Italy is divided into a certain number of districts for the Chamber of Deputies, whereas each Region elects its senators. Each district is assigned a number of seats proportionate to its total of the population of Italy. The winning coalition receives at least 55% of the seats on national level in the House, and on regional level in the Senate, while the remaining seats are proportionally divided between minority parties. For the House, seats won by each party are then allocated at district level to decide the elected candidates. Candidates on the lists are ranked in order of priority, so if a party wins for example ten seats, the first ten candidates on its list receive seats in parliament. The law officially recognized coalitions of parties: to be part of a coalition, a party must sign its official program and indicate its support for the coalition's candidate to the prime-ministership.

=== Mattarellum (1993–2005) ===
Between 1991 and 1993, resulting from two referendums and legislation, Italian electoral law was altered substantially. Electoral law in Italy is determined by Parliament, not by the constitution. This, along with the concurrent collapse of the Italian party system, marks the transition between the First and Second Italian Republics.

=== 1946–1993 electoral system ===
Between 1946 and 1993, Italy used an electoral system that was a nearly pure proportional representation system, which was subject to two insignificant thresholds:

1. that a party needed to achieve 300,000 votes at the national level;
2. Italy was divided into 32 electoral regions (circoscrizioni), of unequal size, which were awarded a certain number of seats in Parliament based on population (e.g., Rome received more than 50). Within these regions, seats were divided proportionally; in order to become a member of parliament, a party member needed to be directly elected within one of these regions – approximately 60,000 votes. This system allocated 90% of the seats in both houses of parliament. The votes that did not go to a winning candidate were then thrown into one national electoral district, which was then divided proportionally and used to determine the remaining 10%, thereby going to candidates not directly elected.

Furthermore, voters were able to list their preferences for candidates on a party list, in order to prevent the parties from exploiting the power they acquired from being able to write their party lists. In practice, parties were able to manipulate these numbers so that preferred members, i.e., members loyal to one faction within a party, could enter Parliament.
