= Franco Gabrielli =

Italian policeman (born 1960)

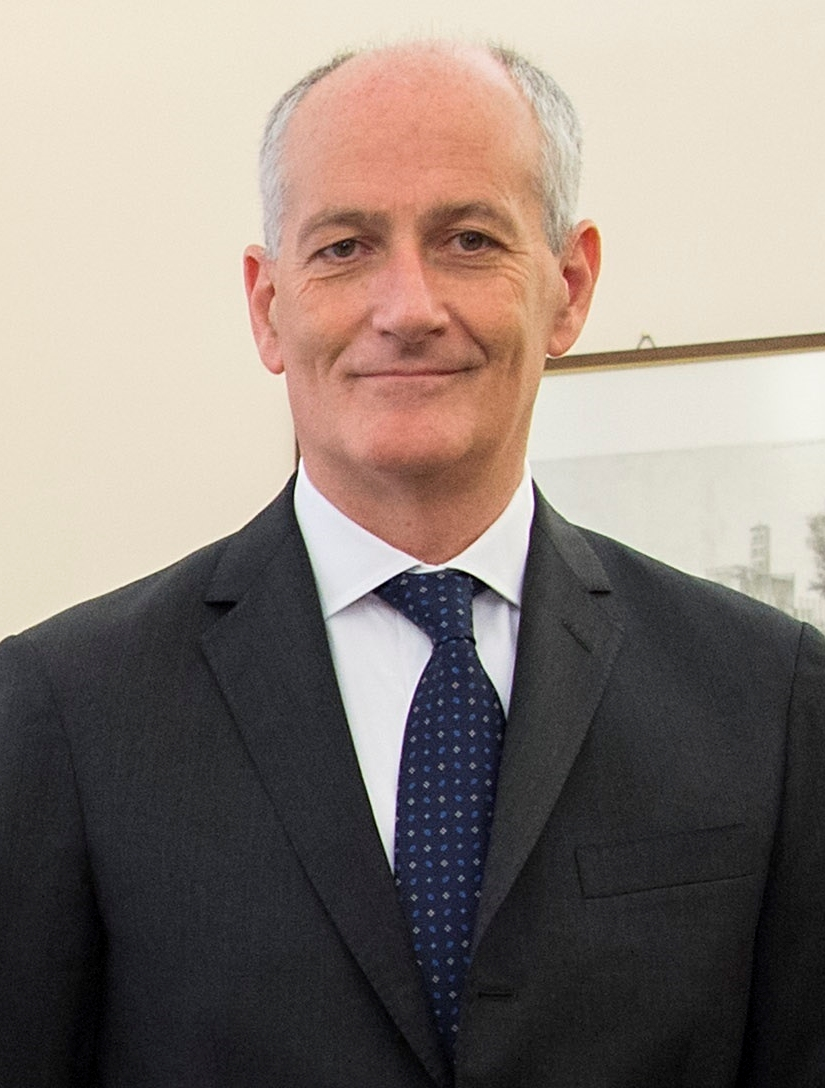
- Born: 13 February 1960 (age 66); Viareggio, Italy
- Education: University of Pisa
- Known for: Chief of the Polizia di Stato (2016–2021)
- Spouse: Immacolata Postiglione (m. 2017)
- Police career
- Department: Polizia di Stato
- Service years: 1987–present

Franco Gabrielli (born 13 February 1960) is an Italian police officer, prefect and civil servant. He has been director of SISDE (the civil intelligence service) and prefect of L'Aquila. In November 2010, he was named chief of the Italian Protezione Civile, an office he held until 2015. In 2016, Gabrielli was named chief of the State Police, holding the office until 2021.

== Biography ==
Born at Viareggio, he graduated in jurisprudence. He subsequently worked for DIGOS (the Italian anti-terrorist department) in Florence, and later moved to the Servizio centrale di protezione, an interforce directorate for police coordination on the national territory. In 2001 he became chief of DIGOS in Rome and from 2003 he coordinated investigations on the New Red Brigades.

In 2005 he became director of the Central Antiterrorism Service and, in the July of the same year, he contributed to the arrest of Hamdi Adus Isaac, responsible for the 21 July 2005 London bombings. Other investigations he directed were those on the mafia Via dei Georgofili Massacre and the assassination of Massimo D'Antona. On 16 December 2006 he was appointed as director of SISDE, a position he held until the service was disbanded the following year and replaced by AISI. Gabrielli remained as director the latter until 15 June 2008.

On 6 April 2009 he was named prefect of L'Aquila, a city in Abruzzo recently struck by a devastating earthquake. From 2009 to 2010 Gabrielli was vice-commissar for the emergency in Abruzzo, and later was vice-chief of the Protezione Civile department for technical and aerial matters. On 13 November 2010, he became national director of the Protezione Civile, succeeding Guido Bertolaso after the latter had been involved in bribery scandals.
