= Riccardo Magi =

Italian politician

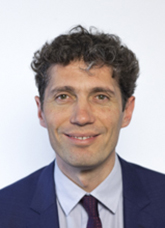

Secretary of More Europe
- Incumbent
- Assumed office 26 February 2023
- Preceded by: Benedetto Della Vedova

Member of the Chamber of Deputies
- Incumbent
- Assumed office 23 March 2018
- Constituency: Rome (2018–2022); Turin (since 2022)

Personal details
- Born: 7 August 1976 (age 50) Rome, Italy
- Party: More Europe
- Education: University of Rome La Sapienza
- Occupation: Politician

Riccardo Magi (born 7 August 1976) is an Italian politician.

== Biography ==
In 2003 Magi graduated in Historical Sciences from the University of Rome La Sapienza, with a thesis on the History of Europe. He entered politics by joining the Italian Radicals.

From 2009 to 2013 he is among the promoters of the proposals of popular resolutions for the municipal register of advance healthcare directive and the recognition of civil unions in Rome. In 2012 he coordinated the citizen referendum campaign on sustainable mobility, land consumption, civil rights and free access to the sea in Ostia.

He was elected to the City Council of Rome in 2013, supporting the centre-left mayoral candidate Ignazio Marino, who is elected Mayor. During the activity in the City Council has asked the adoption, by Rome Capital, of the Registry of Waste, with a hunger strike and a video-appeal to Prime Minister Matteo Renzi, wanting to report the obstructionism of the Democratic Party to its approval. On 4 November 2015 he was elected national secretary of Italian Radicals. In the 2016 administrative elections in Rome, he is the leader of the Radical list Federalists, Laity, Ecologists, supporting candidate Roberto Giachetti, and obtains 2606 preferences, but he is no longer elected to the City Council.

In the political elections of 2018 he was elected to the Chamber of Deputies, supported by More Europe, within the centre-left coalition, winning the tenth constituency of Rome against the Forza Italia candidate Olimpia Tarsia and the Five Star Movement candidate Dino Giarrusso. He joined the sub-component More Europe of the Mixed Group.
