= Agenzia delle Entrate =

Italian government agency

Agency of Revenue
- Agenzia delle Entrate
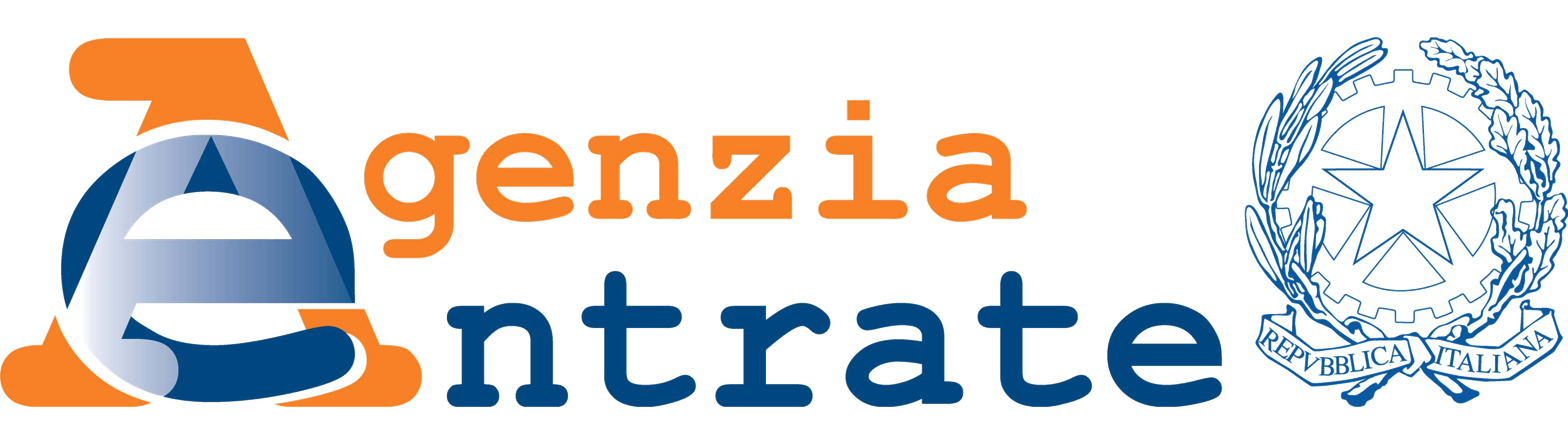

Statutory agency overview
- Formed: 1 January 2001
- Jurisdiction: Italy
- Headquarters: Rome, via Cristoforo Colombo n. 426 C/D - 00145
- Ministers responsible: Treasurer; Assistant Treasurer
- Statutory agency executive: Commissioner of Taxation
- Website: www.agenziaentrate.gov.it

The Agenzia delle Entrate, or the Italian Revenue Agency, is the Italian government agency that enforces the financial code of Italy and collects taxes and revenue.

== Operations and history ==
The agency provides several online services for Italian and non-Italian taxpayers. Italy has several agreements with other tax authorities to prevent double taxation.

As of June 2017, Ernesto Maria Ruffini is the Director General.

Several central departments report to the head of the agency and are responsible for internal audits, personnel and legal issues, organizational matters, etc. The operational area is organized according to the Italian regions. With the introduction of the national electronic Identity (SPID), it is necessary to be an Italian resident to book an appointment at a local Agency. Appointments can be scheduled just online by accessing the relevant webpage in the official Tax Office website. There is a regional head office in each of 19 of the 20 regions; in the autonomous region of Trentino-Alto Adige, there are head offices in Trento and Bolzano. The regional directorates are responsible for the tax offices and other branch offices. The agency had around 32,000 employees in 2020.

== Bilancio 2010 issue ==
Agenzia delle Entrate, in 2010, imposed a €10.6 million fine.

== Real estate functions ==
From 1 December 2012, the Italian Revenue Agency has incorporated the Real Estate and Land Registry Agency (Agenzia del Territorio), as provided for in Article 23 quarter of Decree-Law number 95 of 2012. Cadastral data is provided by the office, with the Territorial Agency, to individual persons only to obtain the cadastral data of properties from a website.
