= 2021 More Europe leadership election =

Congressional primary election

- 18 July 2021
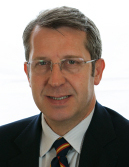
Candidate	Benedetto Della Vedova	Giulio del Balzo
Party	More Europe	More Europe
Delegate count	195	59
Percentage	76.8%	23.2%
Previous Secretary
Benedetto Della Vedova
Secretary
Benedetto Della Vedova

The 2021 More Europe leadership election was a congressional primary election which took place on 16, 17 and 18 July 2021 at Rome to elect the new party leadership.

The candidates to the Secretary were the outgoing Secretary and former MEP Benedetto Della Vedova and the former president of the think-tank FutureDem, Giulio del Balzo. With 76.7% of the votes, Benedetto Della Vedova was elected as Secretary of More Europe for a second term.

== Background ==
=== Tabacci and Fusacchia's departure ===
After the controversy that arose following the accusation that paid supporters voted for the Tabacci list during the first congress, which resulted in Marco Cappato's exit from More Europe, the party found itself embattled again following the birth of the Conte II government. The confidence in the Conte II government was voted by all three parliamentarians, namely MP Riccardo Magi (who later withdrew it), Alessandro Fusacchia and Senator Bruno Tabacci, while the leadership of More Europe wanted to stay at the opposition. After a few months, first Tabacci and then Fusacchia left the party, objecting the choice of staying at the opposition of the Conte II cabinet. However, since at least three deputies are needed in the Chamber of Deputies to form a sub-group of the Mixed Group, Tabacci and Fusacchia temporarily stayed in the same sub-group of More Europe to prevent it from being dissolved – until Magi and Bonino made an agreement to have a single sub-group with Action in late 2020. The departure of Fusacchia and Tabacci, who stood for the Assembly in 2019 with one list each, caused the reduction of the Assembly's membership from 100 to 71 members due to the impossibility of being able to elect new Assembly members to replace the leavers, as they had run out of eligible candidates on those lists.

Meanwhile, former Economic Development Minister Carlo Calenda founded a new party, Action, and asked the leadership of More Europe to merge the two parties. Della Vedova, on the other hand, was more reluctant and would opt for a federation, similar to what the Margherita was in its early years. The two parties eventually joined the scientific committee of "Program for Italy," chaired by Carlo Cottarelli, and which also included Liberal Democratic Alliance for Italy, The Liberals and the Italian Republican Party, with the goal of developing common political proposals.

Frictions between Benedetto Della Vedova and some prominent figures such as Piercamillo Falasca and Carmelo Palma – who were on Della Vedova's side since he founded the Liberal Reformers party back in 2005 – grew over time, and the latter over time challenged Della Vedova on his opposition to the federation with Action, which they instead advocated. The split caused a reversal of positions in the Assembly, and with Falasca and Palma's move to the opposition, along with the loss of the Assembly members who had spilt with Tabacci, Della Vedova no longer had a majority in the Assembly.

=== Tresaurer's vote of no-confidence and Bonino's departure ===
At the Assembly meeting on Dec. 6, 2020, in preparation for the convening of the upcoming congress, which was initially to be held in spring, Treasurer Valerio Federico reported that the new platform adopted by the party, NationBuilder, could not track down payments made by credit cards, and the introduction of the possibility to enroll to the party by postal slips complicated the situation. This meant that the same payment method could be used to enroll multiple people en masse.

The opposition close to Falasca and Silvja Manzi challenged Valerio Federico for never having communicated this information to the Assembly, while the treasurer defended himself by claiming that revealing this information would have compromised the enrollment phase for the congress. The treasurer was also accused of validating collective enrollments consisting of at least 4 people for the same payment method, which is against the provisions of Article 5.2 of the Statute – a charge that was denied by the treasurer, arguing that nominations are invalidated only if there are additional criteria, not only therefore the alleged lack of individuality of the payment.

This led in the postponement of the approval of the Congress rules (which require an approval of the two thirds of the members of the Assembly) and consequently the postponement of the congress itself, and an exchange of accusations between the two factions: Fabrizio Ferrandelli, who had been elected to the Assembly on the list led by Bruno Tabacci but remained in More Europe, challenged Falasca on the increase in registrations in Campania, his home region, while Falasca challenged Ferrandelli on the collective registrations made by postal transfer in Palermo, Ferrandelli's hometown. Soon there was a stalemate to establish mutually accepted criteria for enrollment.

The Assembly meanwhile doubted the work of the Guarantee Committee, which resigned en masse on January, and finally challenged the Treasurer during the March 13 assembly with a motion of no-cofidence passed by 38 votes and 3 votes against it out of 71 Assembly members. Valerio Federico criticized the motion of no-confidence arguing that it was a political maneuver. Following Federico's vote of no-confidence, Emma Bonino in the assembly held on March 14 contested the decision, announcing she was leaving More Europe.

Bonino contested the presentation of an anonymous document that envisioned a united agreement to elect a collegial secretariat that would include majority and opposition, objecting also that the document claimed that its approval would result in the withdrawal of the motion of no-confidence for the treasurer. Subsequently, Della Vedova resigned as secretary of More Europe, thus triggering an extraordinary congress to be held within three months according to the Statute, while at the same time he announced his candidacy for the next congress. Riccardo Magi disputed Emma Bonino's version, claiming that that document he had helped write had been suggested by Della Vedova himself to overcome the impasse and to avoid the motion of no-confidence to the treasurer.

== Procedure ==
=== Timetable ===
Timetable of events for the 2021 More Europe leadership election
Date(s)	Event
6 December	Assembly approves resolution to hold the Congress. Start of the primaries.
7 December	Enrollment for new members closed.
14 March	Della Vedova resigns from Secretary.
15 March	Enrollment for previous members closed.
30 May	The Assembly approves the Congress rules.
6 June	Opening of the pre-congressual phase.
9 June	Submission of candidacies for delegates and amendments are closed.
9–15 June	Members can endorse the candidacies for delegates and amendments.
26–28 June	Voting of the amendments take place.
30 June–3 July	Election of the delegates take place.
4 July	Publication of results of the elected delegates.
4–9 July	Delegates can endorse candidacies for Secretary.
16–18 July	Start of the Congress, held in Rome.
4–18 July	Filing of the candidacies for the Assembly, the Secretary and the President.
18 July	Election of the Secretary, the President, the Tresaurer and the Assembly take place.

== Candidates ==
=== Secretary ===
Portrait	Name	Most recent position	Campaign logo	Slogan	Announced	Refs
	Benedetto Della Vedova (age 64)	Secretary of More Europe (2019–present) Other positions: Coordinator of More Europe (2018–2019); President of Forza Europa (2017–present); Undersecretary at the Ministry of Foreign Affairs (2014–2018); Member of the Senate of the Republic (2013–2018); Party Leader in the Chamber of Deputies for Future and Freedom (2011–2013); Spokesperson of Future and Freedom (2010–2011); President of Libertiamo (2009–present); Member of the Chamber of Deputies (2006–2013); President of the Liberal Reformers (2005–2009); President of the Italian Radicals (2001–2003); Member of the European Parliament (1999–2004)	(benedettodellavedova.eu)	Per un'Italia Europea (For a European Italy)	14 March 2021	
	Giulio del Balzo (age 32)	President of FutureDem (2014–2017)	(scossaliberale.it)	—	30 September 2020	

=== Assembly Lists ===
List	Campaign website	Top candidate	Supported Secretary
Europe in Common (Europa in Comune)	europaincomune.net	Valerio Federico	—
Forward – More Europe Generation (Forward – Generazione +Europa)	Facebook page	Fabrizio Ferrandelli	Benedetto Della Vedova
Future More Europe (+Europa Futura)	piueuropafutura.eu	Riccardo Magi	—
Next Generation +EU (Next Generation +EU)	Facebook page	Federico Eligi	Benedetto Della Vedova
Liberal shock (Scossa liberale)	scossaliberale.it	Giulio del Balzo	Giulio del Balzo

=== Endorsements ===
==== Giulio del Balzo ====
Giulio del Balzo

Deputies

- Massimo Ungaro

Other politicians

- Andrea Calabro, regional coordinator of Umbria for Energies for Italy (2018–2020)

Assembly Lists

- Liberal shock

== Results ==
=== Secretary ===
Candidate	Votes	%
Benedetto Della Vedova	195	76.77
Giulio del Balzo	59	23.23
Total	254	
Valid votes	254	94.42
Invalid and blank votes	15	5.58
Votes cast / Turnout	269	97.46
Abstentions	7	2.54
Registered delegates	276	100.00
Source: Results

Vote by delegates
Della Vedova	76.77%
del Balzo	23.23%

=== President ===
Candidate	Votes	%
Riccardo Magi	160	60.15
Giulio del Balzo	106	39.85
Total	266	
Valid votes	266	98.52
Invalid and blank votes	4	1.48
Votes cast / Turnout	270	97.83
Abstentions	6	2.17
Registered delegates	276	100.00
Source: Results

Vote by delegates
Magi	60.15%
del Balzo	39.85%

=== Delegates ===
Lists	Votes	%	Weighted votes	%	Delegates
Forward – More Europe Generation	514	35.04	544.5	32.86	69 / 276
Next Generation +EU	294	20.04	347.5	20.97	61 / 276
Liberal shock	256	17.45	280.5	16.93	48 / 276
Europe in Common	239	16.29	281	16.96	46 / 276
Future More Europe	164	11.18	203.5	12.28	41 / 276
Total	1.467	100.00	1.657	100.00	276 (Note: Ten delegates are assigned to the Overseas constituency and one delegate is assigned for each thematic group, More Europe Alps and More Europe Republic.)
Source: Delegates elected

=== Assembly ===
Lists	Seats
Forward – More Europe Generation	22 / 100
Next Generation +EU	21 / 100
Liberal shock	19 / 100
Europe in Common	15 / 100
Future More Europe	13 / 100
Della Vedova's list (Note: Ten seats are assigned to the winner Secretary's list, that does not directly run as an Assembly list.)	10 / 100
Total	100
Source: Assembly Seats

== Aftermath ==
During the last day of the congress, Emma Bonino, greeted by a standing ovation from the audience, returned to the party, saying that "I'm glad we got out of this introverted dynamic with the celebration of this congress, which was really beautiful and successful".

In December 2021, More Europe and European Italy reached a court settlement to end the dispute, waiving the actions taken in court and agreeing to a payment of €57,000 from More Europe to European Italy.
