= 2019 More Europe leadership election =

Congressional primary election

- 27 January 2019
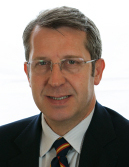

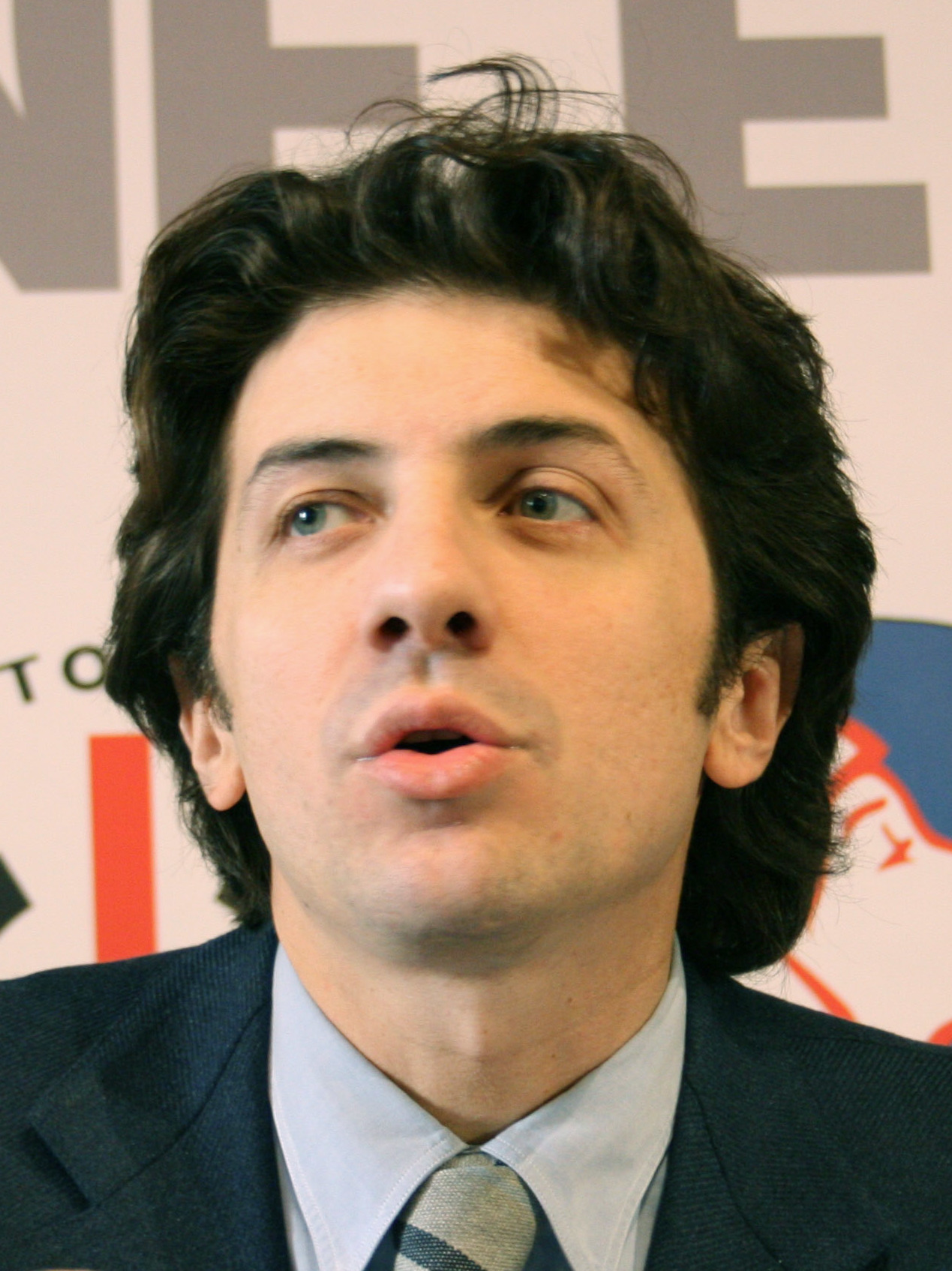

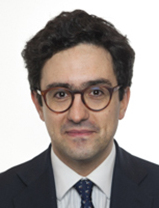
Candidate	Benedetto Della Vedova	Marco Cappato	Alessandro Fusacchia
Party	More Europe	More Europe	More Europe
Delegate count	65	14	10
Popular vote	1,278	693	324
Percentage	55.7%	30.2%	14.1%
Previous Secretary
None
Secretary
Benedetto Della Vedova

A congressional primary election was held on 25, 26 and 27 January 2019 at Milan to elect the new leadership of the More Europe party and to decide upon the political direction of the party.

After the result of the 2018 general election, the three parties that cooperated to the electoral joint list agreed to move on and convert the electoral list into a full-fledged party. The main candidates to the Secretary are the former MEP Marco Cappato, current member of the Chamber of Deputies Alessandro Fusacchia and former MEP Benedetto Della Vedova.

With 55.7% of the votes, Benedetto Della Vedova was elected as Secretary of More Europe.

== Background ==
=== 2018 general election ===
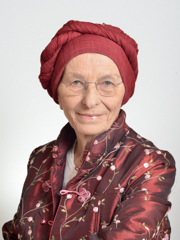
Emma Bonino, More Europe's founder and former leader.

The electoral list was launched in November 2017 by two liberal and pro-Europeanist parties, the Italian Radicals, whose leading members included Emma Bonino, Riccardo Magi and Marco Cappato, and the newborn Forza Europa, led by Benedetto Della Vedova, with the goal to take part in the next general election under the leadership of Emma Bonino. Emma Bonino showed off the list's electoral logo, with her name on it, during an interview at Che tempo che fa, an Italian late-night talk show.

However, in January their alliance with the centre-left was breaking apart due to technical difficulties. The electoral law approved in November 2017 required that the parties that wants to run in the elections and are not supported by any parliamentary group must collect 1,500 signatures for each of the 63 proportional constituencies in which the country has been divided according to the electoral law. However, since the constituencies were published only a few weeks before the elections, for the 2018 elections the number of signatures was reduced to 400, for a total of 25,200 signatures requested. The objection of More Europe concerned the fact that in the form to collect the signatures, they must indicate, along with the candidates in the plurinominal constituencies, all the 348 candidates in the single-member constituencies. The centre-left coalition, however, had not yet reached an agreement for candidates for single-member constituencies, and More Europe believed it was impossible to collect signatures in a few days because they expected that an agreement between the centre-left coalition parties would be reached only in the last days available before the closing of the presentation of candidates, leaving less than a week for the collection of signatures. The Deputy Secretary of the Democratic Party Maurizio Martina has offered to help More Europe to collect signatures within a few days, but Piercamillo Falasca, Secretary of Forza Europa, has declined the proposal explaining that the Democratic Party should ensure "equal conditions of access to the elections".

However, on 4 January Bruno Tabacci, leader of Democratic Centre, a party that had a parliamentary group in the Chamber of Deputies, announced that his party would be allied with More Europe, exonerating the list from the collection of signatures. The list then announced an agreement with the Democratic Party and its centre-left coalition.

The list ran in the centre-left coalition but they got 2.56% of votes in the Chamber of Deputies, falling short to the threshold of 3% for the proportional seats, but elected three deputies in the single-member constituencies, Riccardo Magi in the constituency of Rome 10, Bruno Tabacci in the constituency of Milan 1, and Alessandro Fusacchia, elected from the Italians abroad in Europe; while in the Senate of the Republic they got 2.37% of votes, electing one senator, Emma Bonino in the constituency of Rome 1.

=== The transition to a party ===
After the election, the future of More Europe was unclear. The Statute envisaged a deadline for the party at 30 June 2018: if the founding parties could not reach a unanimity agreement by that date, the party would have been dissolved. The leader Emma Bonino, during a press conference held two days after the elections, expressed her wish to continue with the project. However, the founding parties were divided on how to proceed and what would become More Europe. The proposal of Olivier Dupuis of the creation of a federated party was opposed by that of Riccardo Magi, who proposes to make of More Europe a pan-European confederation, maintaining the unanimity system of the founding parties.

Then the President of More Europe Gianfranco Spadaccia presented a proposal that foresees a transitional Statute, introduces the role of a Coordinator and the creation of an Executive Council composed by 15 members (5 from each of the founder parties), the direct recruitment of individual citizens as members, a constituent congress to be held before the European elections that establishes the definitive statute. Magi presented a counter-proposal that partially accepted Spadaccia's one, on condition that 6,000 members were reached by 31 May 2019. In collaboration with Magi, Spadaccia makes the final proposal, which is approved unanimously by the three political subjects before the deadline, which provides for the appointment of a coordinator and two deputies and sets the date for the congress for January 2019. On July 14 the Council is officially established and Benedetto Della Vedova is elected as Coordinator, while Bruno Tabacci and Massimiliano Iervolino are elected deputies, and finally, Silvja Manzi is elected administrator. On 8 August More Europe officially opened the individual membership recruitment during a press conference and finally on 15 September the name of Emma Bonino was removed from the electoral logo of More Europe.

== Procedure ==
The new Statute that will come into force starting from the next Congress, after its approval and the approval of the amendments, provides for the election of a Secretary, the Directorate, the Treasurer and the Assembly. The statute that will be approved during the Congress will be federal, but the system of unanimous voting will be put aside. The Assembly must call a new Congress every two years.

With the convocation of the Congress made by the coordinator Della Vedova on 22 December, the Congress officially began. Applications must be filed for the Secretary and for the Assembly by 16 January (while subscriptions from the members last from 13 to 18 January), the former supported by at least one-tenth of the members as of 31 December 2018, 200 members, and up to a maximum of 1,000, the latter supported by at least 50 members, up to a maximum of 70. The candidates to Secretary must also present a list of 10 people who will be elected to the Assembly in case of victory of their Secretary, ensuring the minimum presence of each gender of 30%. The candidate lists for the Assembly must present a top candidate followed by at least five other candidates, once they are validated, each list must have at least 25 candidates, up to a maximum of 60, ensuring the minimum presence of each gender of 30%. Finally, the amendments must be supported by at least 200 members before 18 January.

The signing of the candidates to the Secretary, the lists to the Assembly and the amendments are reserved only to the members of More Europe, who can support only one single candidate or proposal for an office and can subscribe to them from the More Europe website. The election takes place by the vote of those members who are present during the Congress at Milan, and it's not possible to delegate one's vote to others.

The Assembly is composed of 100 members, of which 10 are elected with the list of the Secretary and 90 are elected proportionately by the Congress on the basis of the percentage obtained by the lists that have applied to run for the Assembly. The Treasurer and the Secretary are elected by simple majority voting of the members and their term of office lasts for two years, the President is elected from the Assembly by simple majority voting, while the Directorate is composed of 22 members of the Assembly, the Secretary, the Treasurer, the President of the Assembly, the candidates for Secretary who obtained at least 20% of the votes, the first three elected from the Secretary's list by the Assembly, two members for each of the founding parties (RI, FE and CD), and finally the representatives selected by each of the founding parties, for a maximum limit of 25% of the number of elected members of the Assembly.

=== Timetable ===
Timetable of events for the 2019 More Europe leadership election
Date(s)	Event
8 August	Online enrollment for new members is open.
22 December	Coordinator Della Vedova calls for the Congress. Start of the primaries.
4–16 January	Submission of candidacies and amendments.
13–18 January	Members can endorse the candidacies and amendments.
18 January	Online enrollment for new members closed.
19 January	Publication of candidacies.
25–27 January	Start of the Congress, held in Milan.
26 January	Filing of the lists for the Assembly with at least 25 candidates.
26 January	Voting of the Statute and the amendments.
27 January	Election of the Secretary and the Assembly take place.

== Campaign ==
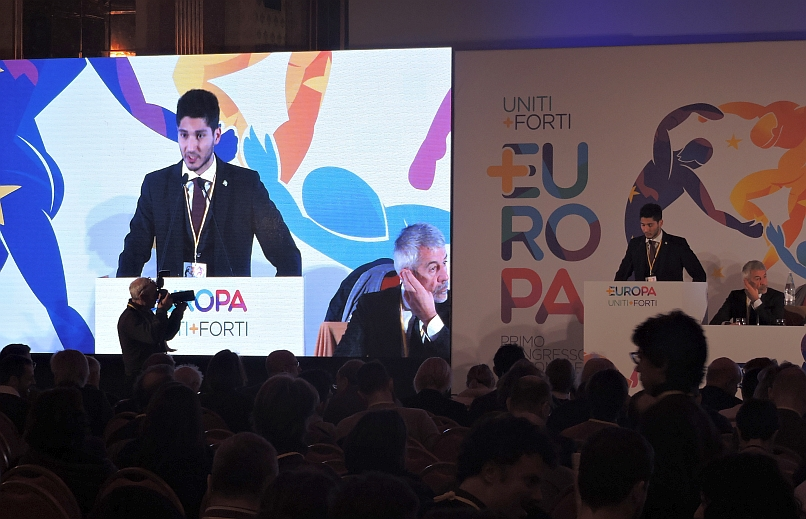
A speech from a member of the European Federalist Movement during the Congress.

The first one to announce his candidacy was Marco Cappato on 10 December. Secretary and then Treasurer of the Associazione Luca Coscioni, Cappato has been fighting for the legalization of euthanasia in Italy for years. In 2017 he helped Fabiano Antoniani, known as Dj Fabo, a quadriplegic man, to take him to a clinic in Switzerland to practice assisted suicide. Once back in Italy, Cappato denounced himself to the police and in October 2018 the Constitutional Court requested the Parliament to fill the legislative gap within a year. In his program, among the main points, he promoted the cutting of structural funds for EU countries that don't respect human rights, a European mobilization on climate and global warming and the promotion of an EU seat at the UN Security Council.

Outgoing Coordinator Benedetto Della Vedova was the other challenger in Congress. President of Forza Europa, coming from the experience of Libertiamo, his candidacy was focused on the concerns of the economic conditions of Italy and the intensification of tensions, hoping for a role of aggregation from the European Union.

The last to express his candidacy was the member of the Chamber of Deputies Alessandro Fusacchia, who proposed a collective leadership in the party, the valorisation of local groups and the promotion of activities through the online exchange of ideas and opinions, exploiting new technologies.

=== Radaelli's candidacy ===
One day before the deadline for submitting nominations as Secretary, Paola Renata Radaelli's candidacy was admitted, managing to collect the 200 subscriptions required to take part at the Congress on 25–27 January. She's the president of the "Victims National Union", which aims to harsher penalties against offenders, a position far apart from those of More Europe in defence of prisoners, she supported the League's reform of the self-defence, on his social profiles she published photos with her and Matteo Salvini, leader of the populist and eurosceptic right-wing party of the League, Massimiliano Fedriga and Magdi Cristiano Allam (both right-wing politicians), she ran in 2012 in the municipal elections of Genoa for The Right, a eurosceptic right-wing party, and she joined "Culture Identity", a radical right and identitarian study center. The list that supported her candidacy in the Assembly, "In Europe yes, but not like that", had as top candidate Gerardo Meridio, national coordinator of Moderates in Revolution, the party of Gianpiero Samorì founded for the primaries of the centre-right of 2012 that were then cancelled. On top of that, the members' increase made believes that there was an attempt to win the Congress by registering other people close to her candidacy. Piercamillo Falasca on his social media claimed that it was a "hostile takeover" organized by a "group of sovereignists", while Silvja Manzi, administrator of More Europe, confirmed that the members' increase was "unusual", promising thorough checks. Marco Cappato then asked the administrator Silvja Manzi to have access to the registration data and to check if they had been paid more registrations with the same credit card. Silvja Manzi actually found out that 191 registrations, including that of Radaelli and Gerardo Meridio, were irregular, resulting in the exclusion of her candidacy and the list linked to her.

== Debates ==
There were three leadership election debates held across Italy during the electoral campaign.

2019 More Europe leadership debates
Date	Location	Participants		
P Participant. N Non-invitee. A Absent invitee.		Cappato	Della Vedova	Fusacchia
15 January 2019	Milan, Lombardy	P	P	N
20 January 2019	Turin, Piedmont	P	P	N
25 January 2019	Milan, Lombardy	P	P	P

== Candidates ==
=== Secretary ===
==== Validated ====
Portrait	Name	Most recent position	Campaign logo	Slogan	Announced	Refs
	Marco Cappato (1971–)	President of the Italian Radicals (2015–2016) Other positions: Member of the Metropolitan City of Milan (2014–2016); Treasurer of the Associazione Luca Coscioni (2011–present); Member of the Milan City Council (2011–2016); Member of the European Parliament (2006–2009; 1999–2004); Member of the Chamber of Deputies (2006); Secretary of the Associazione Luca Coscioni (2004–2011)	(marcocappato.it)	Libertà, Legalità, Laicità (Freedom, Legality, Secularity)	10 December 2018	
	Benedetto Della Vedova (1962–)	Coordinator of More Europe (2018–present) Other positions: President of Forza Europa (2017–present); Undersecretary at the Ministry of Foreign Affairs (2014–2018); Member of the Senate of the Republic (2013–2018); Party Leader in the Chamber of Deputies for Future and Freedom (2011–2013); Spokesperson of Future and Freedom (2010–2011); President of Libertiamo (2009–present); Member of the Chamber of Deputies (2006–2013); President of the Liberal Reformers (2005–2009); President of the Italian Radicals (2001–2003); Member of the European Parliament (1999–2004)	(benedettodellavedova.eu)	Per un'Italia Europea (For a European Italy)	10 January 2019	
	Alessandro Fusacchia (1978–)	Member of the Chamber of Deputies (2018–present) Other positions: Secretary of Movimenta (2017–present)	(contaredipiu.eu)	Contare di Più (Count More)	12 January 2019	

==== Invalidated ====
- Paola Renata Radaelli — President of the Victims National Union (2017–present). Announced her intention to run on 17 January 2019. Invalidated on 23 January 2019.

=== Assembly Lists ===
List	Campaign website	Top candidate	Supported Secretary
Count More (Contare di Più)	contaredipiu.eu	Francesco Galtieri	Alessandro Fusacchia
Europe in Common (Europa in Comune)	europaincomune.net	Valerio Federico	—
Radical Europe (Europa Radicale)	Facebook page	Silvja Manzi	—
European Italy (Italia Europea)	italiaeuropea.com	Piercamillo Falasca	Benedetto Della Vedova
LSD – Freedom, Rule of Law, Democracy (LSD – Libertà, Stato di diritto, Democrazia)	listalsd.eu	Giulia Crivellini	Marco Cappato
European Pride (Orgoglio Europeista)	orgoglioeuropeista.org	Carmelo Palma	Benedetto Della Vedova
Stay United in Europe (Stiamo Uniti in Europa)	stiamounitiineuropa.eu	Bruno Tabacci	Benedetto Della Vedova

=== Endorsements ===
==== Marco Cappato ====
Marco Cappato

Deputies

- Riccardo Magi

Former

- Gianfranco Spadaccia

Local politicians

- Alessandro Capriccioli, regional councillor for Lazio (2018–today)
- Elisa Serafini, former comunal assessor for Genoa (2017–2018)
- Michele Andrea Alfredo Usuelli, regional councillor for Lombardy (2018–today)

Other politicians

- Michele Boldrin, economist, former National coordinator of Act to Stop the Decline (2013–2014), candidate for the European election of 2014 in the North-East Italy constituency for Act to Stop the Decline in the European Choice list
- Costantino de Blasi, risk manager and financial advisor, candidate for the European election of 2014 in the North-West Italy constituency for Act to Stop the Decline in the European Choice list, candidate for the general election of 2013 in the Campanian constituency for Act to Stop the Decline
- Mario Staderini, former National Secretary of the Italian Radicals (2009–2013)
- Silvio Viale, gynecologist, former President of the National Committee of the Italian Radicals (2014–2015), former President of the Italian Radicals (2010–2013)
- Mina Welby, Co-President of Associazione Luca Coscioni (2011–today)

Non-political personalities

- Alberto Alemanno, academic, author and politic activist
- Sandro Brusco, economist
- Augusto Di Benedetto, applied mechanics professor
- Thomas Manfredi, statistician and econometrician at OECD
- Michele Sordo, economist

Assembly Lists

- LSD – Freedom, Rule of Law, Democracy

==== Benedetto Della Vedova ====
Benedetto Della Vedova

Deputies

- Bruno Tabacci

Former

- Ernesto Auci
- Andrea Mazziotti di Celso
- Giuliano Cazzola

Local politicians

- Bruno Gambardella, former comunal assessor for Avellino (2016–2018)

Candidates from the Secretary list

- Vincenzo Camporini, Chief of the Defence General Staff in Italy (2008–2011)
- Olivier Dupuis, MEP (1996–2004), Secretary of the Transnational Radical Party (1995–2003)
- Silvia Enrico, Secretary of Liberal Democratic Alliance for Italy (2014–today), former President of Liberal Democratic Alliance for Italy (2013–2014), former National coordinator of Act to Stop the Decline (2013)
- Chiara Marciani, regional assessor for Campania (2015–present)
- Elena Torri, Mayor of Lizzano in Belvedere (2014–present)

Other politicians

- Piercamillo Falasca, Secretary of Forza Europa (2018–present), Vice President of the association Libertiamo (2009–present)
- Fabrizio Ferrandelli, regional councillor for Sicily (2012–2015), candidate for the mayoral election of Palermo (2017, 2012)
- Carmelo Palma, Coordinator of Forza Europa (2018–present), Director of the association Libertiamo (2009–present), Secretary of Liberal Reformers (2005–2009)

Assembly Lists

- European Italy
- European Pride
- Stay United in Europe

== Results ==
=== Secretary ===
Candidate	Votes	%
Benedetto Della Vedova	1,278	55.69
Marco Cappato	693	30.20
Alessandro Fusacchia	324	14.12
Total	2,295	100.00
Source: Results

Member vote
Della Vedova	55.69%
Cappato	30.20%
Fusacchia	14.12%

=== Assembly ===
Lists	Seats	Votes	%
Stay United in Europe	31 / 100	753	33.47
LSD – Freedom, Rule of Law, Democracy	14 / 100	347	15.42
European Italy	13 / 100	317	14.09
European Pride	11 / 100	288	12.80
Count More	10 / 100	251	11.16
Europe in Common	7 / 100	189	8.40
Radical Europe	4 / 100	105	4.67
Total	100 (Note: Ten seats are assigned to the winner Secretary's list, that does not directly run as an Assembly list.)	2,250	100.00
Source: Results Assembly Seats

== Aftermath ==
Some activists denounced the presence of buses who unloaded members arrived in Milan just to vote in the last day, in exchange for the payment of food, accommodation and travel, receiving instructions on whom to vote for. The main suspects behind the operation were Bruno Tabacci and the former candidate for mayor of Palermo Fabrizio Ferrandelli, who supported Benedetto Della Vedova at the Congress. Della Vedova initially said he knew nothing, while Tabacci challenged the idea that voters arrived by bus were unaware of what they were voting, claiming the use of buses to make people vote from all over Italy. It was discovered that two of those elected to the Assembly in the Tabacci's list were part of the list (later excluded) of Paola Renata Radaelli.

Michele Boldrin, one of the external supporter of Marco Cappato, said that Della Vedova must "start to be ashamed", while Emma Bonino, the founder, preferred not to comment on the incident. Then Cappato asked Della Vedova and Fusacchia to make a joint lodge complaint with the authority competent to start inspections if necessary, an initiative welcomed by Ferrandelli, who also asked him to focus on external enemies instead of feeding the internal suspects. However, in a video posted on Facebook, Tabacci accused the Radicals that they did not accept the results of the Congress and the victory of Della Vedova, and he accused Boldrin, de Blasi and Cappato that they had caused the controversy of the buses. Cappato challenged the accusation by saying that he recognized the results of the Congress but did not accept the methods by which it took place. Later, Della Vedova announced his intention to understand what happened during the Congress, without expressing support for the Cappato proposal.

The deputy Alessandro Fusacchia, one of the challengers to the Secretary, asked Della Vedova to investigate the incident, accepting the proposal of Cappato, otherwise, he would have dissolved the party group in the Chamber of Deputies. One week after the Congress, Cappato announces that he no longer wanted to be part of the governing bodies of More Europe, until the case has been cleared, and regretting the silence of the party leaders.
