= L'Italia c'è =

Centrist liberal political party in Italy

- Coordinator: Gianfranco Librandi
- Founded: 7 February 2022
- Split from: More Europe
- Ideology: Liberalism; Pro-Europeanism
- Political position: Centre
- National affiliation: United States of Europe (2024); Forza Italia (2024–)
- European affiliation: European Democratic Party (2023–2025)
- Colors: Blue

Website
- litaliace.it

L'Italia c'è (lit. 'Italy Is There') is a liberal political party in Italy. It was formed in 2022 by Gianfranco Librandi and Piercamillo Falasca, who left More Europe in 2021 and re-joined it in 2023. Falasca would again leave More Europe in 2024.

== History ==
After the argument between the former vice secretary Piercamillo Falasca and the secretary Benedetto Della Vedova about the rules for the membership admission for the 2021 More Europe leadership election, Falasca left the party. Falasca then launched "European Italy" (formerly presented as a list for the 2019 More Europe leadership election) as a fully-fledged association, with the goal of building a new party autonomous from the two main coalitions. The new party was officially launched on 7 February 2022 by Falasca and Gianfranco Librandi, a deputy of Italia Viva, after having been active in Forza Italia and elected with Civic Choice in 2013 and the Democratic Party in 2018.

Ahead of the 2022 Italian general election, due in September, the party rebranded itself on 27 July 2022 as an electoral list called National Civic List (Italian: Lista Civica Nazionale) following the joining of mayors and local administrators, notably the former mayor of Parma and Italia in Comune leader Federico Pizzarotti and the former Minister of Transport and Mezzogiorno Federato party leader Claudio Signorile. The party initially sought an alliance with the centre-left coalition; ultimately, it decided to run with Matteo Renzi's Italia Viva party due to their refusal to join the Civic Commitment list led by Luigi Di Maio. Separately from Pizzarotti, fellow leading Italia in Comune member Alessio Pascucci organised the National Civic Agenda/Network and joined Civic Commitment. Later in August 2022, Pizzarotti and Falasca announced the breakup with Italia Viva and Action after having received spots in tough constituencies. Librandi stood as a candidate for More Europe.

In late 2022, Falasca and Pizzarotti re-joined More Europe. In March 2023, the party was admitted to the European Democratic Party.

In the run-up of the 2024 European Parliament election, the party, then led by Librandi, was a founding member of a broad, liberal and pro-Europeanist list named "United States of Europe", along with More Europe, Italia Viva, the Italian Socialist Party, the Italian Radicals and the European Liberal Democrats, in order to overcome the 4% electoral threshold. Contextually, Falasca and Pizzarotti left More Europe in dissent and joined Action. On 11 November 2024, Antonio Tajani and Librandi announced that L'Italia C'è has become an affiliate party of Forza Italia. On 3 February 2025, Librandi was nominated as Vice Secretary for Forza Italia in Campania.

== Election results ==
=== European Parliament ===
Election	Leader	Votes	%	Seats	+/–	EP Group
2024	Gianfranco Librandi	Into USE		0 / 76	New	–

== Symbols ==
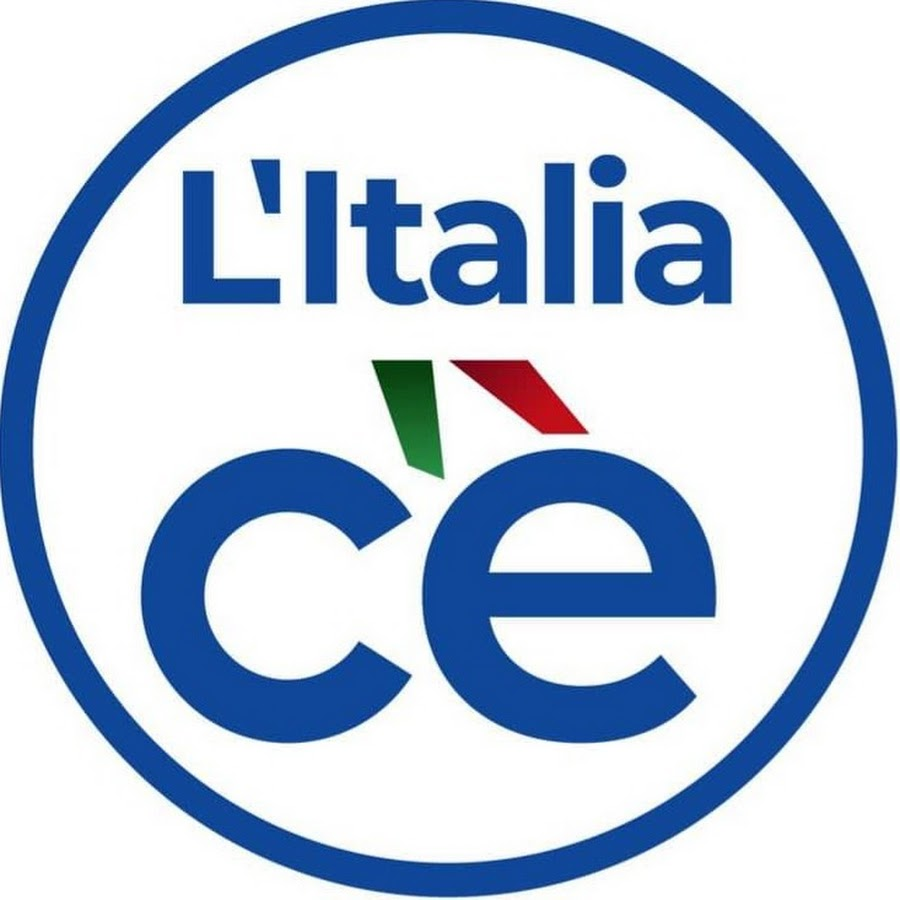
2022–2024

2024–present

== See also ==
- Liberalism and radicalism in Italy
- List of political parties in Italy
