= 2023 More Europe leadership election =

Congressional primary election

- February 26, 2023

250 delegates for the Congress 126 delegates votes needed to win
- Registered: 3,913
- Turnout: 3,808 (97.3%)
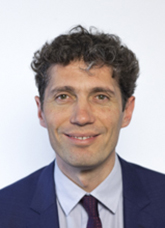

Candidate	Riccardo Magi	Blank ballots
Delegate count	211	37
Percentage	85.1%	14.9%
Previous Secretary
Benedetto Della Vedova
Secretary
Riccardo Magi

The 2023 More Europe leadership election was a congressional primary election that took place on 24, 25, and 26 February 2023 in Rome to elect the new party leadership.

As a result of an agreement between long-time Radical activist Riccardo Magi and the former mayor of Parma, Federico Pizzarotti, the former was elected unopposed as secretary, and the latter was elected President of the party.

== Procedure ==
=== Timetable ===
Timetable of events for the 2023 More Europe leadership election
Date(s)	Event
22 November 2022	Assembly approves the Congress rules and deliberates on key dates for the third Congress. Primaries begin.
15 January	Enrollment for members closes.
23 January	Opening of the pre-congressional phase.
23 January	Submission of candidacies for delegates closes.
23 January	Submission of candidacies for statutory amendments opens.
24 January–2 February	Party members can endorse candidacies for delegates.
12–13 February	Election of delegates takes place.
14 February	Publication of results for the elected delegates.
15 February	Submission of candidacies for statutory amendments closes.
17–24 February	Voting on statutory amendments takes place.
14 –24 February	Filing of candidacies for the Secretary, President, Treasurer, and Assembly positions.
24–26 February	Start of the Congress, held in Rome.
26 February	Election of the Secretary, President, Treasurer, and Assembly members takes place.

== Candidates ==
=== Secretary ===
Portrait	Name	Most recent position	Announced	Refs
	Riccardo Magi (age 50)	Member of the Chamber of Deputies for More Europe (2018–present) Other positions: President of More Europe (2021–2023); Secretary of Italian Radicals (2015–2018); President of Italian Radicals (2014–2015); Municipal Councillor of Rome (2013–2016)	25 February 2023	

=== Assembly Lists ===
List	Campaign website	Top candidate
Free Energies (Energie Libere)	Facebook page	Piercamillo Falasca
IMAGIne More Europe (ImMAGIna +Europa)	Facebook page	Matteo Hallissey
Liberal shock (Scossa liberale)	Facebook page	Giulio del Balzo
Next Generation +EU (Next Generation +EU)	Facebook page	Benedetto Della Vedova
Source: Assembly lists

== Results ==
=== Secretary ===
Candidate	Votes	%
Riccardo Magi	211	85.1
Blank ballots	37	14.9
Total	248	100.00
Valid votes	211	85.1
Invalid and blank votes	37	14.9
Votes cast / Turnout	248	99.2
Abstentions	2	0.8
Registered delegates	250	100.00
Source: Results

Vote by delegates
Magi	85.1%
Blank ballots	14.9%

=== President ===
Candidate	Votes	%
Federico Pizzarotti	203	81.2
Blank ballots	47	18.8
Total	250	100.00
Valid votes	211	85.1
Invalid and blank votes	37	14.9
Votes cast / Turnout	250	100.00
Abstentions	0	0.0
Registered delegates	250	100.00
Source: Results

Vote by delegates
Pizzarotti	81.2%
Blank ballots	18.8%

=== Delegates ===
Lists	Votes	%	Weighted votes	%	Delegates
New Energies with Federico Pizzarotti	—N/a		1,265.9	34.83	87 / 250
IMAGIne More Europe	—N/a		950.9	26.16	66 / 250
Next Generation +EU	—N/a		767.5	21.12	53 / 250
Liberal shock	—N/a		387.35	10.66	26 / 250
Europe in Common	—N/a		201.9	5.55	14 / 250
Territories Rights and Freedom	—N/a		60.85	1.67	4 / 250
Total	3,786	100.00	3,634.4	100.00	250
Valid votes	3,786	99.42	3,634.4	99.42	—N/a
Invalid and blank votes	22	0.58	20.90	0.58	—N/a
Votes cast / Turnout	3,808	97.32	3,655.30	97.29	—N/a
Abstentions	105	2.68	101.65	2.71	—N/a
Registered voters	3,913	100.00	3,756.95	100.00	—N/a
Source: Delegates elected

=== Assembly ===
Lists	Votes	%	Seats
Free Energies	115	46.0	42 / 100
IMAGIne More Europe	69	27.6	25 / 100
Next Generation +EU	51	20.4	18 / 100
Liberal shock	14	5.6	5 / 100
Invalid and blank votes	1	0.4	—N/a
Magi's list (Note: Ten seats are assigned to the winner Secretary's list, that does not directly run as an Assembly list.)			10 / 100
Total	250	100.0	100
Source: Assembly results
