= Forza Europa (2017) =

- President: Benedetto Della Vedova
- Vice President: Andrea Mazziotti
- Secretary: Piercamillo Falasca
- Founded: 31 July 2017
- Ideology: Liberalism; Pro-Europeanism
- Political position: Centre
- National affiliation: More Europe^{1}

Website
- www.forzaeuropa.it
- Politics of Italy; Political parties; Elections^{1} Part of the centre-left coalition

Forza Europa (translation: "Forward Europe", FE) is a liberal and pro-Europeanist political party in Italy.

Its leader and president is Benedetto Della Vedova, an economist and long-time Radical politician, who has been member of the European Parliament for the Bonino List (1999–2004), candidate for President of Lombardy (2000), president of the Italian Radicals (2001–2003), founder and president of the Liberal Reformers (2005–2009), member of the Chamber of Deputies for Forza Italia (2006–2008), The People of Freedom (2008–2011) and Future and Freedom (2011–2013), member of the Senate for Future and Freedom (2013), Civic Choice (2013–2015) and the Mixed Group (2015–2018), and undersecretary at the Ministry of Foreign Affairs in Renzi Cabinet (2014–2016) and Gentiloni Cabinet (2016–2018).

The party took part to the 2018 general election within More Europe (+E).

== History ==
FE was originally launched as a pro European Union campaign during a convention in Milan on 11 February 2017. The event saw the participation of leading public figures, including Mario Monti, Francesco Rutelli, Emma Bonino (leader of the Italian Radicals, who had recently parted ways from the Transnational Radical Party), Carlo Scognamiglio (leader of The Liberals), as well as some members of the Civics and Innovators (CI) group in the Chamber of Deputies (Andrea Mazziotti, Gianfranco Librandi and Stefano Dambruoso). The campaign soon became a structured association, with an active role played by Piercamillo Falasca and Carmelo Palma, who had been part of Della Vedova's inner circle since the years as Radical.

In June 2017 Della Vedova introduced FE to the Alliance of Liberals and Democrats for Europe Party (ALDE Party) in Brussels, and, for their part, ALDE leaders had also been trying to unite FE, Civic Choice (SC), the Radicals and other left-leaning liberals, in order to build the Italian section of the ALDE Party, a goal they have long missed, most notably with the SC-dominated European Choice list in the 2014 European Parliament election (0.7% of the vote).

In July 2017 FE organised a convention in Rome, which was seen as the beginning of its transformation into a full-fledged party. The event was attended by Bonino, Mazziotti, Librandi, Umberto Ranieri and Carlo Calenda (minister of Economic Development).

In November 2017 FE, the Radicals and some CI members launched More Europe (+E), a pro-Europeanist list for the 2018 general election, led by Bonino. +E was part of the centre-left coalition led by Matteo Renzi and the Democratic Party (PD). The list won 2.6% of the vote in the election, falling short of the 3% threshold, and no FE member was elected neither in single-seat constituencies (Della Vedova missed the election in the constituency of Prato, Tuscany for 1.5% of the vote).

In April 2018 FE's first assembly elected Della Vedova president, Mazziotti vice president, Falasca secretary and Palma coordinator of the national board.

In July 2018 +E started to organise itself as a full-fledged party. It was decided that a committee, presided by Gianfranco Spadaccia (a long-time Radical), would lead +E until the founding congress, scheduled for January 2019. The newly formed committee appointed Della Vedova as coordinator.

== Leadership ==
- President: Benedetto Della Vedova (2018–present)
  - Vice President: Andrea Mazziotti (2018–present)
- Secretary: Piercamillo Falasca (2018–present)
- Coordinator of the national board: Carmelo Palma (2018–present)
