= United States of Europe (electoral list) =

United States of Europe Stati Uniti d'Europa
- Leaders: Emma Bonino; Matteo Renzi
- Founded: 27 March 2024
- Dissolved: 10 June 2024
- Ideology: Liberalism; European federalism
- Political position: Centre to centre-left
- Colours: Yellow
- Regional Council of Piedmont: 1 / 51
- European Parliament: 0 / 76

United States of Europe (Italian: Stati Uniti d'Europa, SUE) was a pro-European and liberal electoral list in Italy founded by Emma Bonino and Matteo Renzi to compete in the 2024 European parliament elections in Italy. The list, centred around More Europe and Italia Viva and including other centrist minor parties, was launched in March 2024 in Rome, with the aim of taking part in the 2024 European Parliament election. The list earned 3.77% of the vote but failed to break the 4% threshold of the vote, thus failing to gain any MEPs.

== Composition ==
=== Founding member parties ===
| Parties | Main ideology | Leader(s) | European affiliation | European Parliament group |
|---|---|---|---|---|
| Italia Viva (IV) | Liberalism | Matteo Renzi | European Democratic Party (EDP) | Renew Europe (RE) |
| More Europe (+E) | Liberalism | Emma Bonino | Alliance of Liberals and Democrats for Europe Party (ALDE) | no MEPs |
| Italian Socialist Party (PSI) | Social democracy | Enzo Maraio | Party of European Socialists (PES) | no MEPs |
| Italian Radicals (RI) | Cultural liberalism | Matteo Hallissey | Alliance of Liberals and Democrats for Europe Party (ALDE) | no MEPs |
| European Liberal Democrats (LDE) | Liberalism | Andrea Marcucci | Alliance of Liberals and Democrats for Europe Party (ALDE) | no MEPs |
| L'Italia c'è (IC'è) | Liberalism | Gianfranco Librandi | European Democratic Party (EDP) | no MEPs |

=== Associate parties ===
| Parties | Main ideology | Leader(s) | European affiliation | European Parliament group |
|---|---|---|---|---|
| Us of the Centre (NDC) | Christian democracy | Clemente Mastella | no affiliation | no MEPs |
| Social Democracy (SD) | Social democracy | Umberto Costi | no affiliation | no MEPs |
| European Civics Federation (FCE) | Europeanism | | no affiliation | no MEPs |

== Candidates by constituency ==
=== North-West Italy ===
| Candidates | Parties |
|---|---|
| Emma Bonino (Lead candidate) | More Europe (+E) |
| Gianfranco Librandi | L'Italia c'è (IC'è) |
| Raffaella Paita | Italia Viva (IV) |
| Marco Taradash | More Europe (+E), Italian Radicals (RI) |
| Paolo Giovanni Micheli | European Democratic Party (EDP) (nominee by Italia Viva (IV)) |
| Alessandro Cecchi Paone | Italian Radicals (RI), More Europe (+E) |
| Patrizia De Grazia | Italian Radicals (RI) (endorsed also by More Europe (+E)) |
| Enrica Cattaneo | Italian Socialist Party (PSI) |
| Nadia Gallo | European Liberal Democrats (LDE) |
| Maria Mikaelyan | Community of Free Russians in Italy (nominee by More Europe (+E)) |
| Vittorio Barazzotto | Italia Viva (IV) |
| Matteo Di Maio | More Europe (+E), Italian Radicals (RI) |
| Federico Rossi | Italia Viva (IV) |
| Simona Emanuela Anna Carolina Viola | More Europe (+E) |
| Luca Perego | European Liberal Democrats (LDE) |
| Davide Falteri | Italia Viva (IV) |
| Daria De Luca | Italian Socialist Party (PSI) |
| Alessandra Franzi | Italia Viva (IV) |
| Antonella Soldo | Italian Radicals (RI), More Europe (+E) |
| Matteo Renzi | Italia Viva (IV) |

=== North-East Italy ===
| Candidates | Parties |
|---|---|
| Graham Watson (Lead candidate) | UK Lib Dems (nominee by European Liberal Democrats (LDE)) |
| Antonella Soldo | Italian Radicals (RI), More Europe (+E) |
| Giulia Pigoni | Italia Viva (IV) |
| Davide Bendinelli | Italia Viva (IV) |
| Gabriella Chiellino | Independent |
| Muharem Saljihu, also known as "Marco" | More Europe (+E) |
| Maria Laura Moretti | European Liberal Democrats (LDE) |
| Giorgio Pasetto | More Europe (+E) |
| Francesco Bragagni | Italian Socialist Party (PSI) |
| Marina Sorina | More Europe (+E) |
| Luigi Giordani | Italian Socialist Party (PSI) |
| Fabio Valcanover | Italian Radicals (RI), More Europe (+E) |
| Aurora Pezzuto | European Liberal Democrats (LDE) |
| Nicola Cesari | Italia Viva (IV) |
| Katerina Shmorhav, also known as "Katya" | "Malva" Association - Ravenna's Ukrainians (nominee by More Europe (+E)) |

=== Central Italy ===
| Candidates | Parties |
|---|---|
| Giandomenico Caiazza (Lead candidate) | Radical Independent (nominee by More Europe (+E)) |
| Emma Bonino | More Europe (+E) |
| Marietta Tidei | Italia Viva (IV) |
| Eric Mauritin Jozsef | EuropaNow! (nominee by More Europe (+E)) |
| Emanuela Pistoia | European Liberal Democrats (LDE) (endorsed also by More Europe (+E)) |
| Rosa Di Giorgi | Italia Viva (IV) |
| Olga Surinova | More Europe (+E) |
| Gerardo Stefanelli | Italia Viva (IV) |
| Gianluca Misuraca | More Europe (+E) |
| Silvia Bertolucci | European Liberal Democrats (LDE) |
| Manuela Albertella | Italia Viva (IV) |
| Giuseppina Bonaviri | Italian Socialist Party (PSI) |
| Francesco Cappelletti | European Liberal Democrats (LDE) |
| Tiziano Busca | Italian Socialist Party (PSI) |
| Matteo Renzi | Italia Viva (IV) |

=== Southern Italy ===
| Candidates | Parties |
|---|---|
| Vincenzo Maraio, also known as "Enzo" (Lead candidate) | Italian Socialist Party (PSI) (endorsed also by Social Democracy (SD) and European Civics Federation (FCE)) |
| Manuela Zambrano | More Europe (+E), Italian Radicals (RI) |
| Nicola Caputo | Italia Viva (IV) |
| Alessandrina Lonardo Mastella | Us of the Centre (NDC) |
| Teresa Bellanova | Italia Viva (IV) |
| Caterina Miraglia | Italia Viva (IV) |
| Alfonso Maria Gallo | More Europe (+E), Italian Radicals (RI) |
| Emanuela Pistoia | European Liberal Democrats (LDE) (endorsed also by More Europe (+E)) |
| Massimiliano Stellato | Italia Viva (IV) |
| Stefano Mascaro | Italia Viva (IV) |
| Adriano Pasculli De Angelis | Italia Viva (IV) |
| Giovanna Catacchio | Italian Socialist Party (PSI) |
| Giuseppe Varacalli | Italia Viva (IV) |
| Filomena Greco | Italia Viva (IV) |
| Antonio Rubino | Italia Viva (IV) |
| Elenora Stomeo detta Claudia | More Europe (+E), Italian Radicals (RI) |
| Annunziata Paese | Italia Viva (IV) |
| Matteo Renzi | Italia Viva (IV) |

=== Italian Islands ===
| Candidates | Parties |
|---|---|
| Rita Bernardini (Lead candidate) | Radical independent (endorsed also by More Europe (+E) and Social Democracy (SD)) |
| Francesco Concetto Calanna | European Liberal Democrats (LDE) (endorsed also by More Europe (+E) and Social Democracy (SD)) |
| Fabrizio Micari | Italia Viva (IV) |
| Valentina Falletta | Italia Viva (IV) |
| Pietrina Putzolu | Italian Socialist Party (PSI) |
| Luca Ballatore | Italian Socialist Party (PSI) |
| Carola Politi | More Europe (+E) |
| Matteo Renzi | Italia Viva (IV) |

== Election results ==
=== European Parliament ===
| Election | Leader | Votes | % | Seats | +/– | EP Group |
|---|---|---|---|---|---|---|
| 2024 | Emma Bonino; Matteo Renzi | 883,295 (7th) | 3.77 | 0 / 76 | New | – |

== See also ==
- European Federation
