= Libertiamo =

Italian political association

Libertiamo is a right-libertarian association chaired by Benedetto Della Vedova. The group is the continuation of the Liberal Reformers (RL), an associate party of Forza Italia (FI), formed in 2007 by Benedetto Della Vedova, a former president of the Italian Radicals (RI) who disagreed with the more left-libertarian party leadership's alliance with the centre-left coalition. In 2009, with the official merger of FI into The People of Freedom (PdL), Della Vedova chose to dissolve the RL and to launch a new association, open to people coming from different upbringings. By 2010, Della Vedova distanced from his mentor Silvio Berlusconi and got closer to Gianfranco Fini and his Generation Italy (GI) instead, thus becoming a leading member of the party's internal minority.

The main reason for Della Vedova to join Fini's party was that he and Fini, a conservative with socially liberal instincts, agreed on ethical issues such as abortion, stem-cell research, end-of-life care, and advance health care directive, stating that Fini was "the only one who understood that the moderate, liberal, and European connotation of the Democratic Party needs to be relaunched. Instead, we demonize RU486, we run confessional campaigns, and on immigration we side with Le Pen instead of Sarkozy." In July 2010, along with most supporter of Fini, Della Vedova left the PdL group in the Chamber of Deputies and became vice president of Future and Freedom (FLI).

== Leadership ==
- President: Benedetto Della Vedova (2009–present)
  - Vice President: Piercamillo Falasca (2009–present)
- Director: Carmelo Palma (2009–present)
