= Marco Cappato =

Italian activist and politician (born 1971)

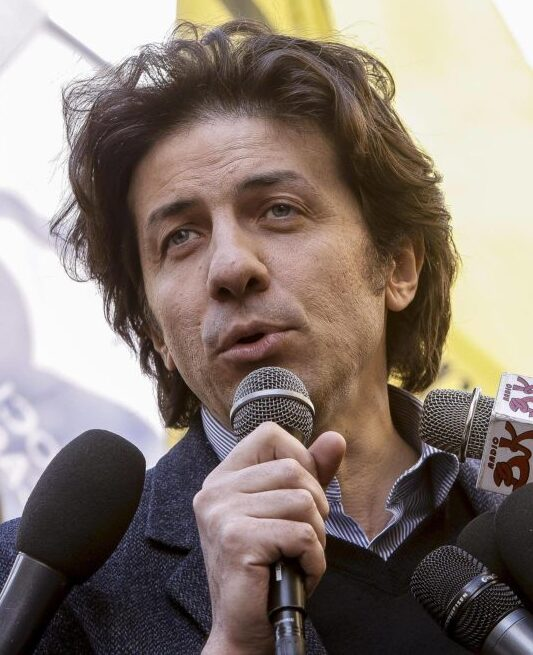

Member of the European Parliament
- In office 8 May 2006 – 13 July 2009
- Constituency: North-East Italy
- In office 20 July 1999 – 19 July 2004
- Constituency: North-East Italy

Member of the Chamber of Deputies
- In office 27 April 2006 – 8 May 2006
- Constituency: Piedmont

Personal details
- Born: 25 May 1971 (age 55) Milan, Italy
- Party: Italian Radicals (since 2001); Eumans (since 2022); Radical Party (1991–2007); More Europe (2018–2019)
- Education: Bocconi University
- Profession: Activist, politician

Marco Cappato (Italian: [ˈmarko kapˈpaːto]; born 25 May 1971) is an Italian activist and politician. Cappato was an Italian Member of the European Parliament from 1999 to 2009. He represented the Bonino List within the Alliance of Liberals and Democrats for Europe parliamentary group. He was member of the Foreign Affairs, Civil Liberties, and Human Rights committees. He also served as a vice-president of the European Parliament Delegation for the relations with the Mashrek Countries. He was the European Parliament's Rapporteur on human rights in the world for 2007.

A nonviolent activist for fundamental rights and liberties, in 2017 he undertook civil disobedience to push the Italian Parliament to approve new rules allowing legal euthanasia in Italy. Cappato breached the law by helping an Italian tetraplegic and blind man from Milan to reach a Switzerland clinic where assisted suicide was legal. Due to Cappato's trial on 24 September 2019, the Constitutional Court of Italy urged Parliament to adopt appropriate legislative protections corresponding to the principles and rights enshrined in Italy's constitution.

== Biography ==
=== Early years ===
Having grown up in a politically engaged family in Milan, Cappato joined Marco Pannella and the Radical Party in 1990. He graduated in economics at Bocconi University in Milan and, after a brief experience in the private sector, joined the Radical group at the European Parliament in 1995.

In 1996, he became Treasurer of the Movement CORA (Coordination of Radical Anti-prohibitionists). During an unauthorized rally in Brussels to protest against censorship, he was arrested outside Le Soir newspaper building and jailed for a few hours

In 1997 and 1998 he was appointed Transnational Radical Party representative at the United Nations in New York City, where he worked on the establishment of the International Criminal Court and on the anti-prohibitionist campaign.

From 15 June to 17 July 1998 he was among the attendees of the Diplomatic Conference which brought the adoption of the Statute of Rome. For his activism at the Conference, he gained attention by the Washington Post.

From February 1999 to July 2001 he was the Coordinator of the "Radical Committee for the liberal revolution of the United States of Europe", the first political movement in 2000 to hold online voting for the election of the leading bodies.

=== Member of the European Parliament, 1999–2009 ===
In June 1999 he is elected at the European Parliament for the Lista Bonino, member of the Alliance of Liberals and Democrats for Europe group. He will gain a second mandate as MEP in 2006 following Emma Bonino's resignation to become Minister for External Trade in the Second Italy Prodi's Government.

He is a member of the Committee on Foreign Affairs and the Delegation for relations with the Mashrek countries.

He's also European Parliament "rapporteur" on the Directive on "privacy with regard to electronic communication".

Due to his efforts in countering generalized digital surveillance, he is awarded "European of the Year" by the weekly "European Voice". Cappato is awarded "for his leadership in the campaign for the protection of privacy, in particular in respect of the preservation of the protection of the citizens personal data in the very moment where the United States have undertaken a war against terrorism." For his campaign against the European monitoring laws, he is nominated for the "Politician of the Year" Award by the American magazine "Wired". From March to November 2002 he has been President of the Transnational Radical Party board. Since October 2002 he has been Coordinator of "Parliamentarians for Antiprohibitionist Action" (PAA), a group of around 200 parliamentarians from around the world.

On 14 January 2009 his report of the European Parliament on access to documents by the European Council, the European Parliament and European Commission was approved in Strasbourg (with 355 votes in favor and 195 against).

In May 2009, the European Council replies to an interrogation submitted in March 2008 by Cappato asking to know the extent of European Institutions dependence on Microsoft, and the savings from an eventual shift to free software. Cappato Initiative gains wide recognition among open source communities around Europe.

Also in May 2009 Cappato is reported by Parlorama.eu in the top list of MEPs scored by presence and activity during the 2004–2009 term. In the report, edited by serving European Officers, Cappato scores 28th on 926 MEPs and he's awarded 5 stars.

During his mandate at the European Parliament, Cappato gains approval by the EP on his proposals for a public registry of the elected members to fight against absenteeism of the Italian MEPs. In 2009 he runs in the European Elections as candidate of the Bonino-Pannella List but he is not elected.

=== Luca Coscioni Association, 2004–present ===
In 2004, elected Secretary of the Luca Coscioni Association for Freedom of Scientific Research, he is one of the promoters of the referendum for the cancellation of the new law on assisted reproduction. He's also coordinator of the radical-liberal area in Italy running for the European elections in 2004.

After the encounter with Luca Coscioni, the Italian university researcher sick of amyotrophic lateral sclerosis, who invests the Radical Party with a campaign for freedom of scientific research, Cappato deals directly with the issue. During his mandate at the European Parliament, he is committed to successfully unlock the European funds for research on stem cells from supernumerary embryos. As Secretary of the Luca Coscioni Association for Freedom of Scientific Research, Cappato is among the promoters of the constitutive session of the World Congress for Freedom of scientific research.

In 2005 he is re-elected Secretary of the Luca Coscioni Association, which helps to constitute in Italy the new liberal-socialist political association named The Rose in the Fist. He is elected for the Piedmont region I to the Lower House at the Italy General Elections held on 9–10 April.

In September 2009 he is among the promoters of the association Agorà Digitale engaged in Italy on Internet Liberties and Digital Rights.

Since 2011 he has been Treasurer of the Luca Coscioni Association.

=== Civil disobedience ===
In December 2001 he is arrested in Manchester for a non-violent action of civil disobedience in connection with the British laws against possession of drugs for personal use.

In September 2006, together with Marco Pannella, Cappato embraces the fight of the Italian Radical Activist Piergiorgio Welby, sick of dystrophia and co-president of the Luca Coscioni Association. Welby asks the President of Italian Republic to grant him the constitutional right to self-determination by suspending the vital treatment keeping him artificially alive.

To support Welby's cause, Cappato starts a hunger strike lasting for 17 days, gaining wide public opinion attention in Italy and worldwide. On 20 December 2006 Welby finally obtains the interruption of vital therapies, with medical assistance.

On 27 May 2007 Cappato is arrested in Moscow. He's at the head of a delegation from the Radical Party, together with parliamentarians from other groups. Their aim is to deliver to Mayor Yuri Luzhkov a letter signed by 50 MEPs calling the authorities to authorize the Gay Pride in Moscow.

While fliers with the text of the letter were being distributed, a group of naziskins violently attacked the demonstrators. Soon after the Russian police, rather than protect the victims, took steps to arrest the demonstrators. Cappato is released few hours later without trial, although he had asked to go to Court.

On 19 December 2008 Marco Cappato, together with Antonella Casu (Secretary of the Italian Radicals), and Sergio D'Elia (Secretary of Hands Off Cain), submitted the complaint to the Labor Minister Maurizio Sacconi, at the Public Prosecutor of Rome, for private violence and intimidation, following his address of a few days before on the issue of Eluana Englaro.

On 17 January 2009, following its complaint, the Public Prosecutor of Rome include the Minister Maurizio Sacconi to the register of suspects.

On 1 May 2012 he goes to Maastricht, The Netherlands, to commit Civil Disobedience against a new law issued by the government of Limburg Province, denying non-residents the consumption of light drugs in coffee-shops. On the same year, Cappato launches a campaign of Legal Euthanasia in Italy. In September 2013 a Citizens' Law Proposal for Euthanasia Legalization is submitted to the Parliament. The Initiative, promoted by Cappato with Luca Coscioni Associations and grassroots movements, gains more than 67,000 signatures by Italian Citizens, while a threshold of 50,000 is requested in Italy for Law Proposal submitted to the Parliament by citizens.

In September 2014 Cappato promotes the Lower House in Italy the establishment of Parliamentary Intergroup for Legal Euthanasia and Legal Will. To press the Parliament discuss the issue, in December 2015 he undertakes a disobedience action by helping Dominique Velati, a woman at a terminal stage for colon cancer, to obtain Euthanasia in Switzerland.

In late 2016, Fabiano Antoniani, aka Dj Fabo, paraplegic and blind after a car accident in 2014, asked Marco Cappato to help him to get assisted suicide in Switzerland. DJ Fabo died on 27 February 2017, after Marco Cappato drove to the clinic where the procedure was carried out.

Under the Italian penal code assisting someone to kill himself is a crime that can fetch from five to twelve years in prison. Aware of the criminal implications of his act, Marco Cappato reported himself to the police once back in his hometown of Milan the day after the suicide.

On 8 November 2017, the trial against Marco Cappato, Treasurer of the Associazione Luca Coscioni, started. Marco Cappato is prosecuted for having assisted Dj Fabo to travel to Switzerland to obtain assisted suicide. Italy's Constitutional Court met on 23 October 2018 to discuss the issue of constitutionality raised by the Court of Appeal of Milan concerning article 580 of the penal code that penalizes those who assist on incite the suicide of a person with penalties from five to 12 years of detention.

On 24 October the Court decided to suspend the decision and to reconvene on 24 September 2019, request Parliament to intervene to adopt appropriate legislative protections corresponding to the principles and rights enshrined in Italy's Constitution. Cappato was eventually acquitted of the charges on 23 December 2019.

In 2016 Cappato, together with Mina Welby, widow of Piergiorgio, accomplished a second disobedience by helping Davide Trentini, a man affected by Sclerosis, to reach Switzerland and obtain assisted suicide. He has been therefore prosecuted and is currently under trial.

=== EUMANS ===
In 2019, Cappato founded the pan-European citizens' movement EUMANS - Citizens for democracy and sustainability. The not-electoral movements pursues goals of democracy, rule of law, sustainability and individual freedoms through the activation of instrument of participatory democracy addressing the European Union. In particular between 2019 and 2021 the European Citizens Initiative Stopglobalwarming.eu - A price on carbon to fight climate change, collected 62,000 signatures and the support of 100 European Mayors for a carbon pricing in the European Union. On 9 November 2021, Marco Cappato presents the appeal for a global carbon pricing in front of the PETI Committee of the European Parliament.
