= Gianfranco Librandi =

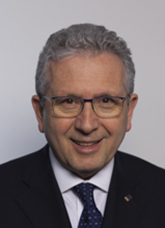

Member of the Chamber of Deputies
- In office 15 March 2013 – 12 October 2022

Personal details
- Born: 3 August 1954 (age 72) Saronno, Italy
- Party: Forza Italia (2004–09); The People of Freedom (2009); Italian Union (2009–13); Civic Choice (2013–16); Independent (2017–present); Democratic Party (2017–19); Italia Viva (2019–22); L'Italia c'è (2022–present); Forza Italia (2024–present)
- Education: University Carlo Cattaneo

Gianfranco Librandi (Saronno, 3 August 1954) is an Italian politician, university professor and entrepreneur.

== Political career ==
In 2013 he was elected to the Chamber of Deputies among the ranks of Civic Choice, while in 2018 he was re-elected with the Democratic Party.

In 2022, together with the former deputy secretary of More Europe Piercamillo Falasca, he founded the association L'Italia c'è, which also included Gennaro Migliore and Camillo D'Alessandro from Italia Viva and Emanuela Rossini from the Trentino Tyrolean Autonomist Party.

In the 2022 general elections, he ran for the Chamber of Deputies as part of More Europe, but was not re-elected. In the 2024 European Parliament elections, he ran for the United States of Europe, receiving 4,520 votes, but was also not elected.
