= Alessandra Maiorino =

Italian politician

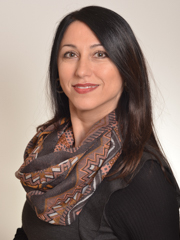
- Maiorino in 2018

Member of the Senate
- Incumbent
- Assumed office 23 March 2018

Personal details
- Born: 24 July 1974 (age 52) Rome, Italy
- Party: Five Star Movement
- Education: Roma Tre University
- Occupation: Teacher

Alessandra Maiorino (born 24 July 1974) is an Italian politician of the Five Star Movement, who serves as a senator. She is a member of the Legislature XVIII of Italy.

== Biography ==
=== Education ===
She graduated in Classics, she obtained the teaching qualification in 2012. She has taught in Italy, Germany and Qatar. She collaborated with the online newspaper Cronache Laiche, which deals with secularism, civil rights and politics.

=== Election as senator ===
In the general elections of 2018 she was elected to the Senate of the Republic in the plurinominal electoral college Lazio - 02 under the Movimento 5 Stelle party. From 3 July 2018 to 16 October 2019 she held the role of vice-president of the International Area of the 5 Star Movement Parliamentary Group in the Senate under the Conte I Government. She is a member of the 1st Permanent Commission (Constitutional Affairs), of the pre-eminent Commission for the protection and promotion of human rights and of the Commission of Inquiry on Femicide. She is also a member of the Italian Parliamentary Delegation to the NATO Parliamentary Assembly.

On 16 October 2019 she was appointed deputy leader of the Movimento 5 Stelle parliamentary group in the Senate.

On 31 March 2022, Senator Maiorino introduced a bill to legalize same-sex marriage.
