= Liberal Reformers =

Italian political party

Liberal Reformers Riformatori Liberali
- Abbreviation: RL
- President: Benedetto Della Vedova
- Co-ordinator: Giuseppe Calderisi
- Founded: 6 October 2005
- Dissolved: 14 March 2009
- Split from: Italian Radicals
- Merged into: The People of Freedom
- Headquarters: Via Uffici del Vicario, 44; 00186 Rome
- Newspaper: Libertiamo
- Ideology: Liberalism; Liberism; Right-libertarianism
- Political position: Centre-right
- National affiliation: House of Freedoms (2005–2008)
- Colours: Orange Blue

The Liberal Reformers (Italian: Riformatori Liberali, RL) was a minor liberal, liberist (Italy's economic liberal tradition), and right-libertarian political party in Italy led by Benedetto Della Vedova, a former president of the Italian Radicals (RI). Founded as a split from the RI in 2005, Della Vedova represented the right wing of the more left-libertarian RI, which was influenced by social democracy and came to represent Keynesian, post-Keynesian, and social liberal positions. In contrast, the RL represented positions close to Milton Friedman and the Chicago school of economics, with influences from Austrian School economist Friedrich Hayek and conservative (Anglo-Saxon liberals) politicians Ronald Reagan and Margaret Thatcher.

As a result of its more right-leaning views, the RL were allies of the House of Freedoms (CdL, the centre-right coalition led by Silvio Berlusconi) in 2006. Although the centre-right coalition was narrowly defeated by The Union (Unione), Della Vedova was elected to the Italian Parliament. In 2008, the RL was part of the newly founded The People of Freedom (PdL), an alliance between Berlusconi's Forza Italia (FI) and the National Alliance (AN) led by Gianfranco Fini, which won the snap election, with two RL deputies elected. Within the PdL, the RL led by Della Vedova began to distance himself from Berlusconi and became closer to Fini.

The RL was formally disbanded in 2009 and RL members like Della Vedova joined Fini's new party Future and Freedom (FeL) in 2010, supported Mario Monti, or rejoined the RI through the More Europe (+Eu) project, which became part of the centre-left coalition. Della Vedova became the secretary of +Eu in 2018.

== History ==
=== Background ===
The future party founder Della Vedova had been a member of the European Parliament (MEP) of the Bonino List (LB) from 1999 (the year of the exploit) to 2004 and a member of the RI since 2001 after having been at the helm of the Reformers-Pannella Clubs. As early as 22 July 2005, in an interview with Adalberto Signore on Il Giornale, Della Vedova had issued the first warning of "something radical" brewing within the centre-right coalition. He said that "when I spoke of alliances, they responded that mine was 'the politics of nothingness'; Emma Bonino went so far as to say that if my line prevailed, she would no longer have anything to do with the Radicals, while Marco Pannella urged me to look elsewhere, specifically at the Daisy party." While Della Vedova felt more in tune with the centre-left on issues like secularism, this could not justify his attempt to return to the Italian Parliament "alongside some liberals, yes, but also pacifists 'without ifs and buts,' outspoken anti-Americans, justicialists, GMO-free Greens, and communists opposed to the Biagi law", and supporting "a historic figure in the power system like Prodi".

According to Della Vedova, the RI between the 1990s and 2000s had been "the most radically liberal and pro-American, and therefore most 'anti-left in Italy', not only on war but also on economic and social policies, the labor market, and justice", to the point of being labeled subversive or reactionary by left-wing leaders. As a result, Della Vedova felt that looking to the left "without even having time to discuss it within the movement's bodies" would have been risky to say the least, and that greater political results could be achieved within the centre-right coalition and implemented the long-sought and unfinished liberal revolution promised by Berlusconi in 1994, sparking "a new space for liberal and free-market politics". To build this space, Della Vedova drew on the support of various individuals "with a radical, liberal, and reformist political background", starting with comrades from the Transnational Radical Party (PRT) who were active in FI, such as Giuseppe Calderisi, or who had already been elected with Berlusconi's party, such as Marco Taradash. For Della Vedova, a unified centre-right party could exist as the two-party system suggested (he said "it would be a fascinating challenge for the Radicals"), and that even if this had not been achieved, there would have been more room to express liberal and free-market ideas within the centre-right coalition, "starting with the still untapped political and reformist strength of Forza Italia".

=== Foundation and symbol ===
The RL was founded on 6 October 2005 by a split from the RI led by those like Della Vedova who were opposed to the formation of the Rose in the Fist (RnP) alliance together with the Italian Democratic Socialists (SDI), as a component of the wider centre-left coalition (Unione), and instead supported an alliance with the centre-right coalition (CdL). The party united former RI members as many former members of the Italian Liberal Party (PLI) and FI, although Della Vedova, Taradash, Calderisi, and Carmelo Palma (among the party founders) were not able to convince Marco Pannella and other prominent RI members to join the centre-right coalition through the RL. The party was founded with the aim of propagating liberal and libertarian ideas to the centre-right coalition.

Della Vedova stated that "the best thing would be to have the symbol of the Radicals", which went into partnership with the SDI and resurrected the symbol of the RnP for lists of the association of the same name made up of representatives of the Pannella List (LP) and the SDI, with the participation of the Luca Coscioni Association and the Federation of Young Socialists within the centre-left coalition. As for the more liberal wing, the project of a unified party also faded away—the idea of proportional representation had ultimately prevailed—so the group prepared to run in the elections with the name and symbol presented to the press in November 2005: a salmon—placed between the party's initials—chosen to signal the decision to swim against the current and go in the opposite direction from that followed by Pannella and others. Since the RnP had chosen to indicate in its symbol the reference to "secularists, liberals, socialists, radicals", Della Vedova and other party members decided that the emblem needed to be more recognizable, so they inserted the original orange-background emblem (with the salmon faded) in a blue circle, above the words "Radicals for Freedoms", with the first and last words prominently displayed to identify themselves and mark their choice of side.

=== 2006 and 2008 general elections ===
Ahead of the 2006 Italian general election, the party symbol was presented on 19 February 2006, and was deposited between 24–26 February in preparation for the 9–10 April general election. In practice, the party symbol was only seen on the ballots for the Senate of the Republic and only in the Italian regions of Apulia, Sicily, and Veneto because elsewhere they failed to collect the required signatures), as in the Chamber of Deputies the party preferred to federate with FI, placing its own candidates on the Berlusconi party lists. The centre-right coalition lost the election, and of the candidates lined up within FI, only Della Vedova was elected.

During the election campaign, the satirical-drama film The Caiman by Nanni Moretti was released in March 2006, and the news agencies ran a statement, issued on 1 April, by Calderisi and Taradsah, who stated: "To express their full solidarity with Silvio Berlusconi and to give the best liberal response to the defamatory accusatory campaign waged by the left, the RL have decided to change their symbol, replacing the salmon with a caiman. In the regions where we are present with our lists, voters will still find our old symbol because that is the symbol officially deposited with the Ministry of the Interior for this election. But starting on April 11, we will officially adopt the new symbol, which places the name Riformatori Liberali alongside the silhouette of a caiman in the same colors as the salmon. It will be a salmon-colored caiman." Ultimately, the caiman did not appear on the symbol.

After the 2006 general election in which Della Vedova was elected a member of the Chamber of Deputies on FI's party list, the explicit aim of the grouping was to unite the Italian centre-right into a single party and strengthen liberal and secularist positions in it. The RL acted both as a political faction of FI both as a unifying agent of centre-right liberals. In October 2006, the RL launched a manifesto called "Give a Libertarian Soul to the Centre-Right" together with famous journalists (Vittorio Feltri, Arturo Diaconale, Filippo Facci, and Giordano Bruno Guerri), academics, and politicians from both FI and AN. On 1 November, Della Vedova called on the RI to join the centre-right coalition in the next general election. Some days earlier, Della Vedova had wished that he, Pannella, Emma Bonino, and Daniele Capezzone would find themselves together again in the centre-right coalition. On 7 November, when Capezzone finally left the RI and the centre-left coalition, Della Vedova opened for him the doors of FI and the centre-right coalition. In the 2008 Italian general election, the RL were part of the list of PdL and had two deputies elected: Della Vedova and Calderisi.

=== Dissolution and aftermath ===
Soon after the 2008 general election, Capezzone, who had previously joined the centre-right coalition, was appointed by Berlusconi as spokesman of FI. On 14 March 2009, shortly before the constituent congress of the PdL resuled in the merge of Berlusconi's and Fini's parties, the RL was dissolved and its members, led by Della Vedova, formed a new association named Libertiamo. Within the PdL, Della Vedova distanced from his mentor Berlusconi and got closer to Fini and Generation Italy (GI) instead. The main reason for that was that Della Vedova and Fini, a conservative with socially liberal instincts, agreed on ethical issues such as abortion, stem-cell research, end-of-life care, and advance health care directive. Della Vedova said that Fini was "the only one who understood that the moderate, liberal, and European connotation of the Democratic Party needs to be relaunched. Instead, we demonize RU486, we run confessional campaigns, and on immigration we side with Le Pen instead of Sarkozy."

In July 2010, Della Vedova left the PdL to become a member of Fini's new party FeN and was among the members of the parliamentary group. In 2013, Della Vedova was elected to the Senate of the Republic among the supporters of Monti and joined Civic Choice (SC), later becoming Undersecretary of Foreign Affairs, until the launch of Forza Europa (FE) in 2017 and the establishment of +Eu, with the RI and later the Democratic Centre (CD) led by Bruno Tabacci, of which he became secretary in 2018.

== Ideology ==
The RL had a right-libertarian platform, inspired among others by the economic policies of Friedman, Hayek, Reagan, and Thatchter, including a strong support for free market, privatization, deregulation, lower taxes, and competition in the health care and education systems. They also proposed an American-styled reform of Italian political system (their slogan was "America, Market, Individual"), including presidentialism, competitive federalism, and first-past-the-post with a plurality voting system. Despite being a small party, the RI were also keen supporters of a two-party system. In foreign policy, they were staunchly pro-American and supportive of human rights all over the world. Internationally, the RL, along with the RI, were members of the PRT, the successor of the Radical Party (PR) and a non-governmental organization (NGO) working at the United Nations (UN) level.

The RL was in favour on the legality of abortion and stem cell research but did not stress much the point, supporting them on right-libertarian grounds rather than progressivism. Similarly, differently from other liberal and more left-libertarian and progressive parties, the RL supported civil unions for homosexual couples but opposed civil unions for opposite-sex couples and same-sex marriage. Della Vedova explained this position by arguing that there was no need of regulation for free cohabitation of opposite-sex couples and instead proposed swift procedures for divorce, which are lengthy in Italy.

The RL were keen on the return to the use of nuclear power in Italy, which was prohibited by a referendum proposed by the PR in 1987, and were also the party of the centre-right coalition to be more involved in green politics by contesting the hegemony of left-wing politics on these issues, and proposed a new liberal-green part for the centre-right coalition. Explicitly inspired by the "Vote blue, go green" campaign of the British Conservative Party led by David Cameron, they launched their own campaign on the subject named "+ Blue, + Green. A Competition of Ideas. A Liberal Policy on the Environment for the Program of the Centre-Right".

== Leadership ==
- President: Benedetto Della Vedova (2005–2009)
- Spokesman: Marco Taradash (2005–2009)
- Coordinator: Giuseppe Calderisi (2005–2009)
- Secretary: Carmelo Palma (2005–2009)

== See also ==
- Libertiamo
