= More Europe =

Political party in Italy

More Europe Più Europa
- Secretary: Riccardo Magi
- President: Matteo Hallissey
- Founder: Emma Bonino
- Founded: 23 November 2017; 8 years ago
- Headquarters: Via Nazionale 172, Rome
- Membership (2025): 6,159
- Ideology: Liberalism (Italian); Pro-Europeanism
- Political position: Centre to centre-left
- National affiliation: Centre-left coalition (2018–present) with Action (2021–2022); United States of Europe (2024)
- European affiliation: Alliance of Liberals and Democrats for Europe
- Colours: Gold
- Chamber of Deputies: 2 / 400 (0.5%)
- Senate: 0 / 205 (0%)
- European Parliament: 0 / 76 (0%)
- Regional Councils: 1 / 896

Website
- piueuropa.eu

More Europe (Italian: Più Europa or +Europa; +E or +Eu) is a liberal and pro-European political party in Italy, part of the centre-left coalition and member of the Alliance of Liberals and Democrats for Europe Party.

== History ==
=== Foundation ===
More Europe was launched in November 2017, seeking to participate in the 2018 general election within the centre-left coalition centred on the Democratic Party (PD). The founding members were two liberal and distinctively pro-Europeanist parties: the Italian Radicals (RI), whose leading members included Emma Bonino (a former minister of International Commerce and Foreign Affairs), Riccardo Magi and Marco Cappato, and Forza Europa (FE), led by Benedetto Della Vedova, a former Radical elected in 2013 with Future and Freedom (FLI) and later transitated through Civic Choice (SC). The RI and FE were joined by individual members of the Civics and Innovators (CI) sub-group in the Chamber of Deputies, formed by former SC members (two CI deputies, Andrea Mazziotti and Stefano Dambruoso, were already involved with FE).

Angelo Bonelli, coordinator of the Federation of the Greens, had earlier proposed to the Radicals a joint list together with Progressive Camp (CP), a would-be party launched by Giuliano Pisapia, named "Ecology, Europe, Rights". However, Pisapia announced that he would not participate in the election and declared CP's experience over, while the Radicals organised +E and the Greens would form an alternative list named Together.

=== 2018 general election ===
In early January 2018, Bonino and Della Vedova announced that +E would run as a stand-alone list, due to technical reasons associated with the new electoral laws. While the PD leadership was trying to find a solution to those problems, on 4 January, Bruno Tabacci, leader of the centrist, mostly Christian-democratic and also pro-Europeanist Democratic Centre (CD), announced that his party would join the coalition +E, in alliance with the PD, to overcome those issues. Later in January, +E was enlarged also to the Progressive Area (AP), a small left-wing party emerged from the dissolution of the aforementioned CP.

The list won 2.6% of the vote in the election, falling short of the 3% threshold, but had three elects in single-seat constituencies (Bonino to the Senate, Magi and Tabacci to the Chamber) and one among Italians abroad (Alessandro Fusacchia, a Radical, in the European constituency). After the election, +E was part of the opposition to Giuseppe Conte's first government, composed of a coalition of the Five Star Movement (M5S) and the League.

In the regional elections held on the same day of the general election, +E won one seat in Lombardy and one in Lazio.

=== Political party ===
In July 2018, +E started to organise itself as a full-fledged party. It was decided that a committee, presided by Gianfranco Spadaccia (a long-time Radical), would lead +E until the founding congress, scheduled for January 2019. The newly formed committee appointed Della Vedova as coordinator. In January 2019, at the congress, Della Vedova was elected secretary of +E with 55.7% of the vote, defeating Marco Cappato (30.2%) and Alessandro Fusacchia (14.1%).

In February 2019, the party was admitted into the Alliance of Liberals and Democrats for Europe Party.

In the run-up to the 2019 European Parliament election +E was joined by: Italia in Comune (IiC), a green and progressive party led by Federico Pizzarotti; the Italian Socialist Party (PSI), a minor social-democratic party, member of the Party of European Socialists (PES); the Italian Republican Party (PRI); the Italian section of the European Democratic Party (EDP/PDE), led by Francesco Rutelli; and, in the North-East, Team Köllensperger (TK), a liberal party from South Tyrol, observer member of the ALDE Party. The slates included, along with Bonino and Della Vedova: David Borrelli and Daniela Aiuto, two MEPs both originally elected with the M5S; Federica Sabbati, a former secretary-general of the ALDE Party; and art critic Philippe Daverio.

In the election, the party obtained 3.1% of the vote, falling short of the 4% threshold – thus, no MEPs.

=== Splits and new alliances ===
In August 2019, tensions grew within the coalition supporting the government, leading to the issuing of a motion of no-confidence by the League. During the following government crisis, the M5S and the PD agreed to form a new cabinet together, under outgoing Prime Minister Conte. In September, +E decided not to support the newly formed Conte II Cabinet, despite opposition by Tabacci, Magi and Fusacchia. The three voted in favour of the government in the Chamber, while Bonino voted against in the Senate. Consequently, Tabacci led CD, which had continued to be active as an associate party, out of the party. However, some leading members of CD, notably including Fabrizio Ferrandelli, chose to stay within +E. Della Vedova reassured that the party would continue activity also after CD's departure. In October, also Fusacchia announced he was leaving the party, which was left with only one deputy, Magi, who remained despited his early support of the government.

In the 2020 regional elections, +E won a seat in Campania, falling short in other places, notably in Veneto, Tuscany and Apulia.

In November 2020, Magi and Bonino formed joint sub-groups in the Mixed Groups of the Chamber and the Senate, respectively, with the deputies and senators affiliated with Action (A), a political party led by Carlo Calenda. The sub-group in the Chamber counted four deputies, the one in the Senate three senators.

In February 2021, Della Vedova was appointed undersecretary of Foreign Affairs in Mario Draghi's government.

In March 2021, Carlo Cottarelli, a former director of the International Monetary Fund, was chosen by +E, Action, the PRI, the Liberal Democratic Alliance for Italy (ALI) and The Liberals to head of a scientific committee designed to elaborate of a joint political program.

During a national assembly in March, treasurer Valerio Federico suffered a motion of no confidence and Bonino left the party in protest. The motion was supported by Magi, Igor Boni, Silvja Manzi, Piercamillo Falasca and Carmelo Palma, the first three leading members of Italian Radicals and the latter two formerly close associates of Della Vedova. Subsequently, Della Vedova resigned as secretary. As a result, a congress should have been held within three months. Subsequently, Palma replaced Federico as treasurer. In late May Michele Usuelli was appointed new treasurer and the congress was rescheduled for July.

During the party's second congress in July, Bonino returned into the party's fold, and Della Vedova, Magi and Maria Saeli were elected secretary, president and treasurer, respectively. Della Vedova received 77% of the vote by delegates and Magi 60%, while Saeli was unopposed.

In January 2022, the party formed a federation with Action.

=== 2022 general election and aftermath ===
In the run-up of the 2022 general election, +E broke up with Action, as the latter decided not to align with the centre-left coalition led by the PD, but to form a stand-alone list with Italia Viva (IV). Also, the Italian Radicals disaligned from +E and offered a generic support to the centre-left, without endorsing a specific list. Nevertheless, some of the most senior members the Italian Radicals, like Bonino, Magi, Manzi, Lorenzo Strik Lievers, Manuela Zambrano, Valerio Federico and several others, continued to be active in +E as well and are running as candidates for the party, which chose to add "Bonino" to its symbol. +E's electoral lists included also some newcomers and/or independents, such as Marco Bentivogli (a reformist trade unionist), Dorina Bianchi (a social-conservative), Gianfranco Librandi (L'Italia c'è and ex-IV), Enzo Peluso (ex-PRI) and Franz Ploner (Team K).

In the election, the party obtained 2.8% of the vote, falling short of the 3% threshold. Della Vedova and Magi were elected to the Chamber from single-seat constituencies, while Bonino was defeated in her Senate constituency. Following the election, the two +E elected deputies and Luca Pastorino of èViva formed a joint sub-group within the Mixed Group.

In December 2022, treasurer Saeli and Fabrizio Ferrandelli, both leading members in Sicily, switched to Action.

In February 2023, the party held its third congress. Della Vedova chose not to run again for secretary. Magi, a long-time Radical, was elected secretary and Pizzarotti, a former mayor of Parma for the M5S turned independent who had recently joined the party, was appointed president. Originally, Magi and Pizzarotti were rivals for secretary, but a deal was brokered by Bonino. By the way, Pizzarotti's list was the most voted by delegates and will have more representatives in the party's assembly.

In March 2024, in the run-up of the 2024 European Parliament election, the party gave birth to a broad, liberal and pro-Europeanist list named "United States of Europe", along with the Italian Radicals, Italia Viva, the Italian Socialist Party, the European Liberal Democrats and Volt Italy, in order to overcome the 4% electoral threshold. Pizzarotti, who was closer to Action, initially opposed the agreement, but the party's assembly finally approved it, with no formal objections. However, Pizzarotti and deputy secretary Falasca chose to leave the party and join Action instead. In late April the electoral list was joined also by L'Italia c'è.

In July 2024, the party's assembly elected Bonino as president of the party.

In February 2025, the party held its fourth congress. Magi was re-elected secretary with 74.0% of the delegates' vote, despite being unopposed, while Matteo Hallissey, president of the Italian Radicals, was elected president with 69.5% of the vote, by defeating former leader Della Vedova, who obtained 30.5%.

In the 2025 regional elections +E ran within joint lists in several regions, obtaining one elect only in Tuscany.

== Composition ==
=== Founding members ===
Party	Main ideology	Leader
Democratic Centre	Christian left	Bruno Tabacci
Italian Radicals	Liberalism	Riccardo Magi
Forza Europa	Liberalism	Benedetto Della Vedova
Progressive Area	Democratic socialism	Michele Ragosta

=== Current associate parties ===
Party	Main ideology	Leader
Italian Radicals	Liberalism	Filippo Blengino
Forza Europa	Liberalism	Benedetto Della Vedova
Team K	Liberalism	Paul Köllensperger

=== Former associate parties ===
Party	Main ideology	Leader
Democratic Centre	Christian left	Bruno Tabacci
Italia in Comune	Progressivism	Federico Pizzarotti
Italian Republican Party	Liberalism	Corrado Saponaro
Progressive Area	Democratic socialism	Michele Ragosta
Italian Socialist Party	Social democracy	Enzo Maraio
European Democratic Party	Centrism	Francesco Rutelli

== Election results ==
=== Italian Parliament ===
Election	Leader	Chamber of Deputies					Senate of the Republic					Government
Election	Leader	Votes	%	Seats	+/–	Position	Votes	%	Seats	+/–	Position	Government
2018	Emma Bonino	841,468	2.6	3 / 630	–	7th	714,821	2.4	1 / 315	–	7th	Opposition (2018–2019)
2018	Emma Bonino	841,468	2.6	3 / 630	–	7th	714,821	2.4	1 / 315	–	7th	Opposition (2019–2021)
2018	Emma Bonino	841,468	2.6	3 / 630	–	7th	714,821	2.4	1 / 315	–	7th	National unity government (2021–2022)
2022	Emma Bonino	823,932	2.8	2 / 400	▼1	▼8th	809,412	2.9	0 / 200	▼1	▼8th	Opposition (2022–present)

=== European Parliament ===
Election	Leader	Votes	%	Seats	+/–	EP Group
2019 (Note: Run in a joint list with Italia in Comune and Italian Socialist Party.)	Emma Bonino	833,443 (6th)	3.11	0 / 76	New	–
2024	Emma Bonino	Into USE		0 / 76	0	–

=== Regional Councils ===
Region	Election year	Votes	%	Seats	+/–
Abruzzo	2019	14,198 (12th)	2.36	0 / 31	–
Apulia	2020	5,062 (19th)	0.30	0 / 51	–
Campania	2020	45,500 (14th)	1.93	1 / 51	▲1
Emilia-Romagna	2020	33,087 (10th) (Note: In a joint list with Italian Republican Party and Italian Socialist Party.)	1.53	0 / 50	–
Lazio	2023	14,870 (14th)	0.96	0 / 50	▼1
Liguria	2020	15,081 (9th) (Note: In a joint list with Italia Viva and Italian Socialist Party.)	2.41	0 / 31	–
Lombardy	2023	–	–	0 / 80	▼1
Marche	2020	17,268 (8th) (Note: In a joint list with Green Europe and Civic list Marche.)	2.77	0 / 31	–
Piedmont	2019	34,993 (9th)	1.82	0 / 51	–
Veneto	2020	14,246 (12th) (Note: In a joint list with Volt Europa.)	0.69	0 / 51	–

== Leadership ==
=== Federation ===
- Coordinator: Benedetto Della Vedova (2018–2019)
  - Deputy Coordinator: Bruno Tabacci (2018–2019), Massimiliano Iervolino (2018–2019)
- Administrator: Silvja Manzi (2018–2019)
- President: Gianfranco Spadaccia (2018–2019)

=== Political party ===
- Secretary: Benedetto Della Vedova (2019–2021, 2021–2023), Riccardo Magi (2023–present)
  - Deputy Secretary: Piercamillo Falasca (2019–2020), Costanza Hermanin (2019–2020), Piercamillo Falasca (2023–2024), Rosario Marinello (2025–present), Antonella Soldo (2025–present)
  - Coordinator: Giordano Masini (2019–2021, 2021–2023), Nicolò Scibelli (2023–2025)
- President: Bruno Tabacci (2019), Simona Viola (2019–2021), Riccardo Magi (2021–2023), Federico Pizzarotti (2023–2024), Manuela Zambrano (acting, 2024), Emma Bonino (2024–2025), Matteo Hallissey (2025–present)
- President of the Assembly: Bruno Tabacci (2019), Simona Viola (2019–2021), Fabrizio Ferrandelli (2021–2022), Giulio Del Balzo (2023), Manuela Zambrano (2023–2025), Agnese Balducci (2025–2026), Tommaso Rotella (2026–present)
  - Vice President of the Assembly: Alessandra Senatore (2019–2021), Nicoletta Parisi (2021–2023), Carla Taibi (2021–2023), Bruno Gambardella (2023–2025), Cristina Bagnoli (2023–2025), Michele Di Lorenzo (2025–present), Debora Striani (2025–present)
- Treasurer: Silvja Manzi (2019), Valerio Federico (2019–2021), Carmelo Palma (2021), Michele Usuelli (2021), Maria Saeli (2021–2022), Alfonso Maria Gallo (2022–2023), Carla Taibi (2023–present)

== Symbols ==
Official logo

2018 general election

2019 European election

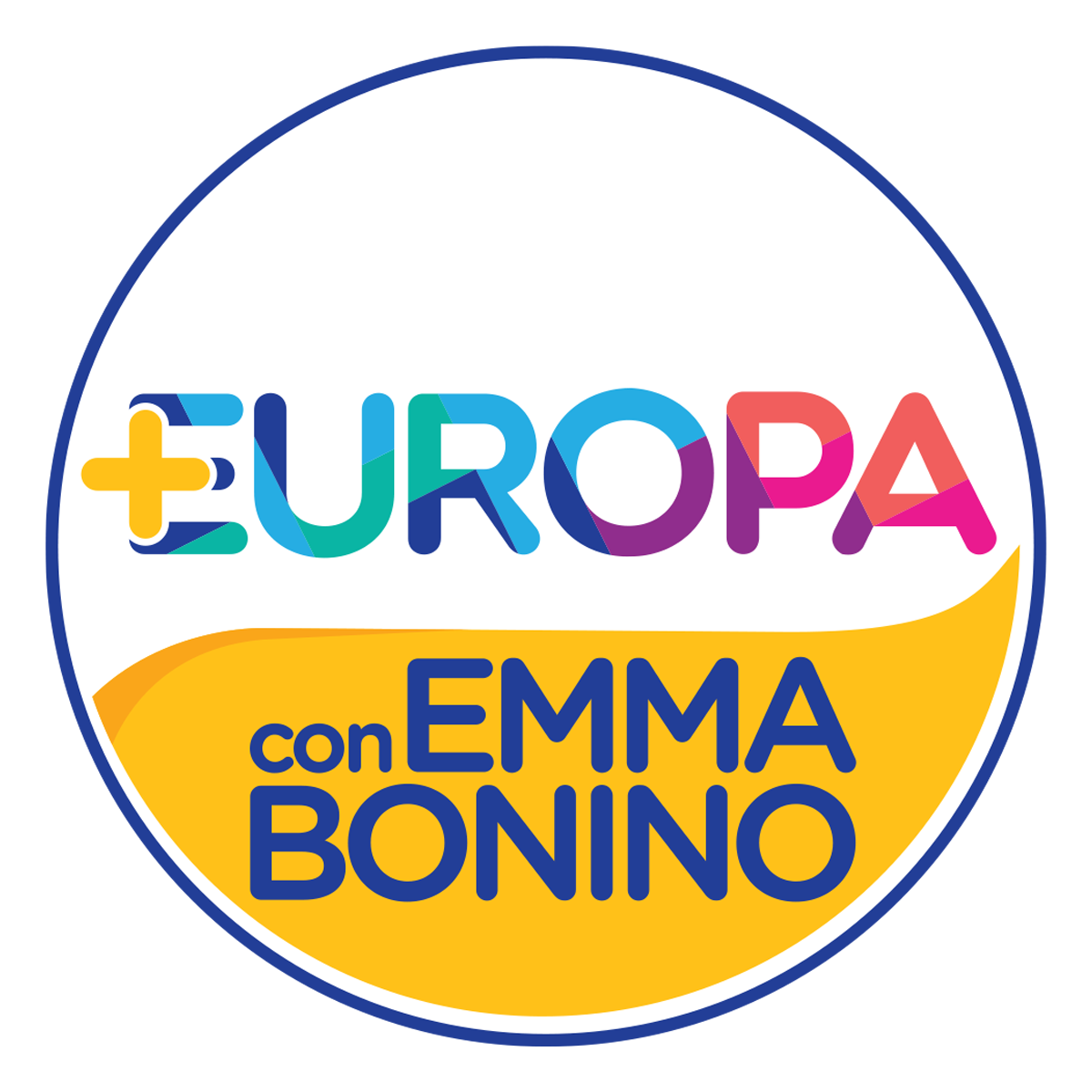
2022 general election
