= Andrea Mazziotti di Celso =

Italian politician (born 1966)

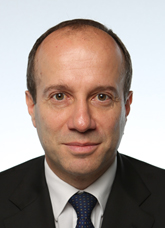
- Mazziotti di Celso in 2013

Member of the Chamber of Deputies
- In office 15 March 2013 – 22 March 2018
- Constituency: Lombardy 3

Personal details
- Born: 31 December 1966 (age 59)
- Party: Action (since 2019)
- Parent: Manlio Mazziotti di Celso (father)

Andrea Mazziotti di Celso (born 31 December 1966) is an Italian politician. From 2013 to 2018, he was a member of the Chamber of Deputies. From 2015 to 2018, he served as chairman of the Constitutional Affairs Committee.
