= Gianfranco Spadaccia =

Italian journalist and politician (1935–2022)

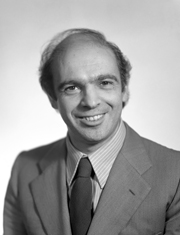
- Spadaccia in 1979

Member of the Chamber of Deputies
- In office 2 July 1990 – 4 July 1990
- Constituency: Verona
- In office 9 July 1983 – 30 September 1986
- Constituency: Bologna

Member of the Senate
- In office 2 July 1987 – 10 April 1990
- Constituency: Lombardy; Lazio

Personal details
- Born: 28 February 1935 Rome, Italy
- Died: 25 September 2022 (aged 87) Rome, Italy
- Party: PSDI (until 1955); PR (1955–1989); TRP (1989–2017); RI (2001–2022) +E (2019–2022)
- Education: Sapienza University of Rome
- Occupation: Journalist

Gianfranco Spadaccia (28 February 1935 – 24 September 2022) was an Italian journalist and politician. A member of the Radical Party and the Transnational Radical Party, he served in the Chamber of Deputies from 1983 to 1986 and again from 2 to 4 July 1990. He also served in the Senate of the Republic from 1987 to 1990.

== Early life and education ==
Spadaccia was born in Rome on 28 February 1935 and studied law at the Sapienza University of Rome. During his youth and university years, he was active in student and secular organizations, including the Unione goliardica italiana and the Unione nazionale universitaria. These early involvements shaped his later political commitments.

== Journalism career ==
Spadaccia became a professional journalist, working first with the agency AGI (Agenzia Giornalistica Italia). Later, he collaborated with a variety of magazines and periodicals, eventually becoming a senior editor in some roles.

== Political career ==
=== Early political activism ===
Initially he was a member of the Italian Democratic Socialist Party (PSDI) before joining in 1955 the newly founded Radical Party (Partito Radicale). After a crisis in the Radical Party in 1962 (the “caso Piccardi”), he worked with Marco Pannella to maintain continuity in the Radical organization.

=== Leadership roles in the Radical Party ===
He served as Secretary of the Radical Party during several periods: 1967–1968, and 1974–1976. He also held the role of President of the Radical Party’s Federal Council in 1967–68.

=== Parliamentary offices ===
He was elected to the Chamber of Deputies for multiple legislatures: in 1979, 1983–1986, and also briefly in July 1990. Additionally, he served in the Senate of the Republic from 1987 to 1990.

== Major activism and political causes ==
Spadaccia was involved in many civil rights and reform movements, particularly within the Radical tradition. Some of his key involvements:

- Campaigns for the legalization of divorce, reform of family law, and the rights related to oblique conscience.
- He was arrested in June 1975 during a campaign by CISA (Center of Information on Sterilization and Abortion) in an act of civil disobedience challenging Italian abortion laws. This contributed to the public debate that led to the law regulating abortion in 1978 (Law 194).
- Fought for prison reform in the 1980s, including collaboration in protests/fasting with Adelaide Aglietta demanding improvements in prison staff levels and conditions.
- Later supported referendums and democratic institutional reforms, including electoral law reform.
- Was involved in movements for abolition of the death penalty, international justice for crimes against humanity, and the freedom of scientific research (stem cells, etc.).

== Later roles and affiliations ==
- From 2006 to 2008, served as Garante per il Comune di Roma delle persone private della libertà, a municipal ombudsman-type function for people deprived of liberty in Rome.
- Member of the direction of Radicali Italiani.
- With the rise of +Europa, a pro-European liberal-radical political list/party, he took a leading role. On 28 January 2019 he was elected first president of +Europa. However, in the 2019 European elections his candidacy collected few votes, and soon after he stepped down.

== Death and legacy ==
Spadaccia died in Rome on 24 September 2022, at the age of 87, and his passing was widely noted in the Italian press, particularly among radical, liberal, and civil rights circles, with remembrance of his role in many landmark reforms.
