= Benedetto Della Vedova =

Italian politician

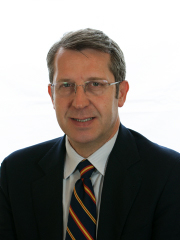

Secretary of More Europe
- In office 18 July 2021 – 26 February 2023
- Preceded by: Simone Viola (acting)
- Succeeded by: Riccardo Magi
- In office 27 January 2019 – 14 March 2021
- Preceded by: Office established
- Succeeded by: Simona Viola (acting)

Member of the Chamber of Deputies
- Incumbent
- Assumed office 13 October 2022
- Constituency: Milan
- In office 28 April 2006 – 14 March 2013
- Constituency: Piedmont 1

Member of the Senate of the Republic
- In office 15 March 2013 – 22 March 2018
- Constituency: Lombardy

Member of the European Parliament
- In office 20 July 1999 – 19 July 2004
- Constituency: North-West Italy

Personal details
- Born: 3 April 1963 (age 63) Sondrio, Italy
- Party: Pannella List (1994–99); Bonino List (1999–2005); Italian Radicals (2001–05); Liberal Reformers (2005–09); People of Freedom (2009–10); Future and Freedom (2010–13); Civic Choice (2013–15); Forza Europa (2017–present); More Europe (2019–present)
- Education: Bocconi University

Benedetto Della Vedova (Sondrio, 3 April 1962) is an Italian politician. A keen pro-Europeanist, Della Vedova is president of Forza Europa (FE) and was secretary of More Europe (+EU), the latter comprising FE and the Italian Radicals, from 2019 to 2021 and from 2021 to 2023. He has held public office multiple times.

== Political career ==
Della Vedova, a long-time Radical, started to be active in politics in 1994, when he followed Marco Pannella, founder and leader of the Radical Party and the Transnational Radical Party, into the Pannella List, of which he was briefly secretary.

During his career, Della Vedova was member of the European Parliament for the Bonino List (1999–2004), the electoral successor of the Pannella List, candidate for President of Lombardy (2000), president of the Italian Radicals (2001–2003), founder and president of the Liberal Reformers (2005–2009), which was then re-booted as Libertiamo, member of the Chamber of Deputies for Forza Italia (2006–2008), The People of Freedom (2008–2011), and Future and Freedom (2011–2013), member of the Senate of the Republic for Future and Freedom (2013), Civic Choice (2013–2015), and the Mixed Group (2015–2018), and under-secretary at the Ministry of Foreign Affairs in the Renzi government (2014–2016) and Gentiloni government (2016–2018).

From 2001 to 2003, Della Vedova was president of the Italian Radicals, a party launched after the defeat of the Bonino List in the 2001 Italian general election. In 2003, he was the strongest challenger to Daniele Capezzone for the leadership of the party on a platform based on free-market economic liberalism and the hidden proposal of joining Silvio Berlusconi's centre-right House of Freedoms coalition but was defeated. In 2005, he left the Italian Radicals, which under the leadership of Pannella, Bonino, and Capezzone had decided to join forces with the Italian Democratic Socialists in the Rose in the Fist and support Romano Prodi and his centre-left The Union, and launched the Liberal Reformers.

In the 2006 Italian general election, Della Vedova was elected to the Chamber of Deputies on the list of Forza Italia, Berlusconi's party and dominant force in the House of Freedoms. Re-elected to the Chamber in the 2008 Italian general election, he later distanced himself from Berlusconi and the centre-right coalition, joined Future and Freedom of Gianfranco Fini, was elected senator in the 2013 Italian general election, switched to Civic Choice, and was appointed in the centrist governments led by Prime Ministers from the Democratic Party.

In 2017, Della Vedova launched Forza Europa. In the run-up of the 2018 Italian general election, he was a founding member of More Europe, which was part of the centre-left coalition. Having been defeated in the single-seat constituency of Prato in Tuscany, he was appointed coordinator of More Europe. In January 2019, he was elected secretary at the party's founding congress. On 1 March 2021, he was appointed Undersecretary at the Ministry of Foreign Affairs and International Cooperation in the national unity government led by Mario Draghi.

== See also ==
- 2019 More Europe leadership election
- 2021 More Europe leadership election
