= Italian Radicals =

Liberal political party in Italy

Italian Radicals Radicali Italiani
- Secretary: Filippo Blengino
- President: Matteo Hallissey
- Founded: 14 July 2001; 25 years ago
- Preceded by: Radical Party (not legal predecessor)
- Headquarters: Via Angelo Bargoni 32–36, 00153 Rome
- Newspaper: Notizie Radicali; Quaderni Radicali
- Membership (2025): 649
- Ideology: Liberalism; Libertarianism
- Political position: Centre
- National affiliation: Centre-left coalition (2004–2013, 2017–present); More Europe (2017–2022, 2024–present); United States of Europe (2024)
- European affiliation: Alliance of Liberals and Democrats for Europe
- Colours: Yellow
- Chamber of Deputies: 1 / 400 (0.3%)
- Senate: 0 / 205 (0%)
- European Parliament: 0 / 76 (0%)
- Regional Councils: 0 / 896

Website
- radicali.it

The Italian Radicals (Italian: Radicali Italiani, RI) are a liberal and libertarian political party in Italy. The party draws inspiration from 19th-century classical radicalism and the Radical Party. The RI are a member of the Alliance of Liberals and Democrats for Europe Party and were previously a member of the Liberal International.

Established on 14 July 2001 with Daniele Capezzone as its first secretary, the party describes itself as "liberale, liberista [and] libertario", where liberale refers to political liberalism, liberista is an Italian term for economic liberalism, and libertario denotes a form of cultural liberalism concerning moral and social issues.

From 2001 to 2017, the party intended to be the Italian section of the Transnational Radical Party (TRP) as the continuation of the Radical Party founded in 1955 by the left wing of the Italian Liberal Party and re-launched in the 1960s by Marco Pannella. As the Radical Party had become a transnational non-governmental organization working mainly at the United Nations level, which by statute could not participate in national elections, its Italian members organised themselves into the Pannella List between 1992 and 1999 and the Bonino List until 2001, when they established the RI. In 2017, the TRP broke with the RI. From 2017 to 2022 and again since 2024 the RI have been associated with More Europe (+E), a broader liberal party led by Radicals or former Radicals. Quaderni Radicali and Notizie Radicali are the party's newspapers. Radio Radicale is the official radio station of the party; in December 2008, it was awarded by Italia Oggi as the "best specialized radio broadcaster".

== History ==
=== Background ===
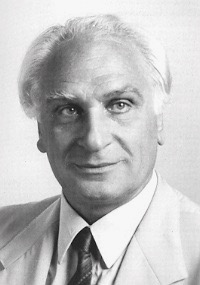
Marco Pannella, historical Radical Party leader

The Radical Party was long a left-libertarian movement in Italy, often proposing itself as the most extreme opposition to the Italian political establishment. When Silvio Berlusconi entered the political arena in 1994, the Radicals, who were then organised mostly into the Pannella List and were attracted by Berlusconi's proposed economic liberalism, supported him, albeit critically and without becoming directly involved in his centre-right first government (1994–1995), in the hope of a "liberal revolution" as opposed to the conservative and statist political establishment represented by traditional parties.

The relationship between the Radicals and Berlusconi, whose allies included socially conservative groups at odds with the Radicals' cultural liberalism, soon ended. In the 1999 European Parliament election, the Bonino List obtained 8.7% of the vote and seven MEPs, including Emma Bonino, Marco Pannella, Marco Cappato and Benedetto Della Vedova. However, the Radicals were not able to convert that electoral success into a more stable political influence, as subsequent elections would show.

=== Road to the new party (1999–2005) ===
Shortly after the 1999 election, they deserted Berlusconi's proposal of welcoming them back into the centre-right fold and instead formed the Committee of Radicals for the Liberal Revolution and the United States of Europe, led by Cappato. In the run-up of the 2000 regional elections, the opposite happened: Berlusconi's conservative allies posed a veto on the Radicals, who wanted to re-compose the alliance. Consequently, they ran independent bids in most regions, obtaining elects only in Piedmont and Lombardy.

In 2001, after a defeat in the general election (only 2.3% of the vote and no seats), they re-organised themselves as Italian Radicals and elected 28-year-old Daniele Capezzone as secretary and Della Vedova, Rita Bernardini and Luca Coscioni as joint presidents.

In the run-up of the 2005 regional elections, the Radicals understood that their isolation was no longer sustainable and took the unprecedented step of contextually asking to join either the centre-right House of Freedoms or the centre-left The Union, regardless of their respective political platforms. The request was turned down by both coalitions, but the effort opened the way for the party's re-positionment in the Italian party system.

=== Rose in the Fist (2006–2007) ===
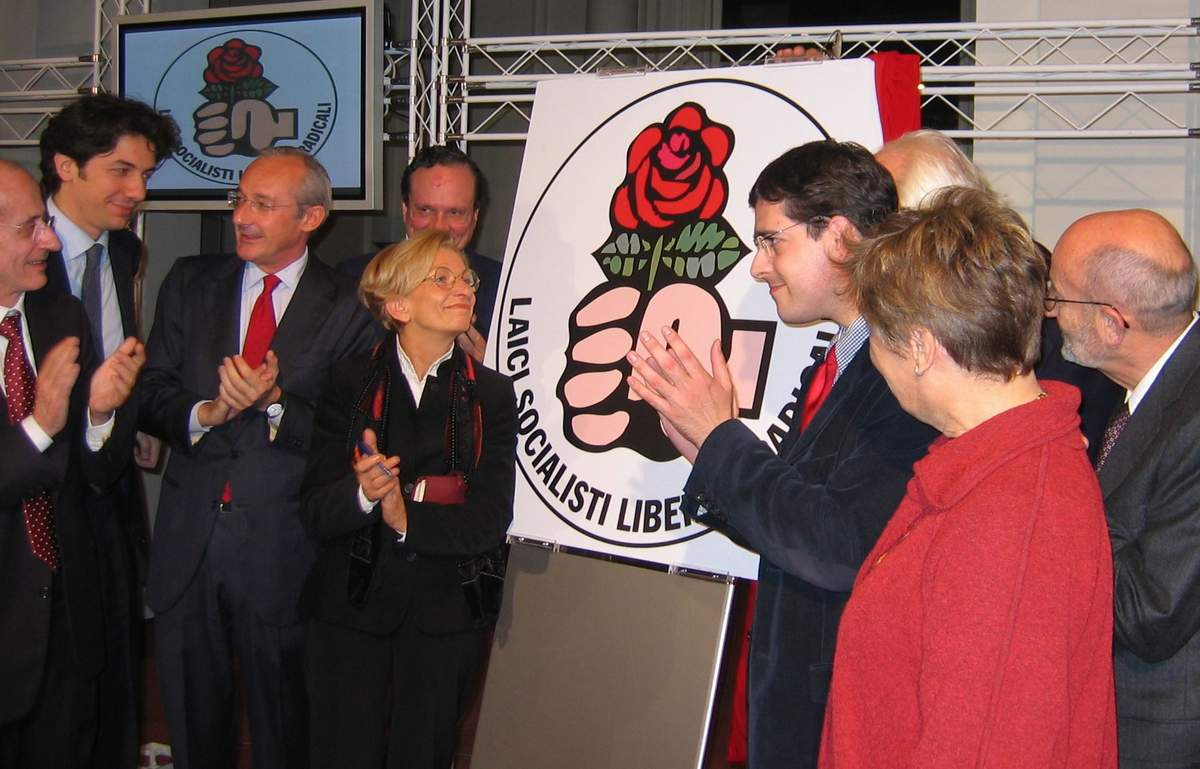
Launch of Rose in the Fist in 2006 (in the center, from left to right: Enrico Boselli, Emma Bonino and Daniele Capezzone)

In November 2005, the Radicals formed an alliance with the Italian Democratic Socialists (SDI), becoming de facto members of The Union coalition for the 2006 general election. The "rose in the fist", the symbol of the Socialist International (which included the SDI) which the Radical Party bought from the French Socialist Party, was chosen for the joint list that was thus named Rose in the Fist (RnP). This decision led those Radicals who were more keen on an alliance with the centre-right to split: this group, led by Della Vedova, launched the Liberal Reformers and joined the House of Freedoms, eventually merging into Berlusconi's Forza Italia.

In the election, the list won a mere 2.6% of the vote, much less than the combined support for the two parties before the alliance (the Radicals alone got 2.3% in the 2004 European Parliament election). The Radicals lost voters in their strongholds in the North to Forza Italia, while the Socialists lost ground in their southern heartlands to The Olive Tree parties (see electoral results of the RnP). After the election, Bonino was sworn in as Minister of European Affairs and International Trade in the Prodi II Cabinet.

In November 2006, after a row with Pannella, Capezzone was forced not to run again for secretary and was replaced by rank-and-file Bernardini. Since then, although not officially leaving, Capezzone became very critical of the government and formed his own political association named Decide!, closer to the centre-right than the centre-left. Later on, Capezzone entered Forza Italia and became the party's spokesman.

In November 2007, the RnP was disbanded as the SDI merged with minor Socialist parties to form the modern-day Italian Socialist Party. The Radicals were at a new turning-point of their history. In the run-up of the 2007 congress, Pannella declared that the party should "give absolute priority to economic, liberal and libertarian reforms rather than the civil struggle to Vatican power, prepotency and arrogance", which had been central in 2006. This did not mean a reconciliation with the centre-right.

=== Within the Democratic Party (2008–2012) ===
In the 2008 general election, the Radicals stood for re-election in list with the Democratic Party (PD). Under an agreement with PD's leader Walter Veltroni, six deputies and three senators were elected. After the election, Bonino was appointed Vice President of the Senate and the Radicals joined the PD's parliamentary groups. In June, Bernardini, Maria Antonietta Coscioni and Elisabetta Zamparutti (all three elected MPs) were replaced by Antonella Casu, Bruno Mellano and Michele De Lucia as secretary, president and treasurer, respectively. In November, the new leadership was confirmed by the national congress.

In the 2009 European Parliament election, the Radicals ran separately from the PD under the banner of Bonino-Pannella List. Having obtained 2.4% of the vote, they failed to return any MEPs and were excluded from the assembly for the first time in 30 years. In November, Mario Staderini replaced Casu as secretary.

Bonino ran for President of Lazio for the centre-left coalition in the 2010 regional election, but was defeated by Renata Polverini.

=== Out of Parliament (2013–2016) ===
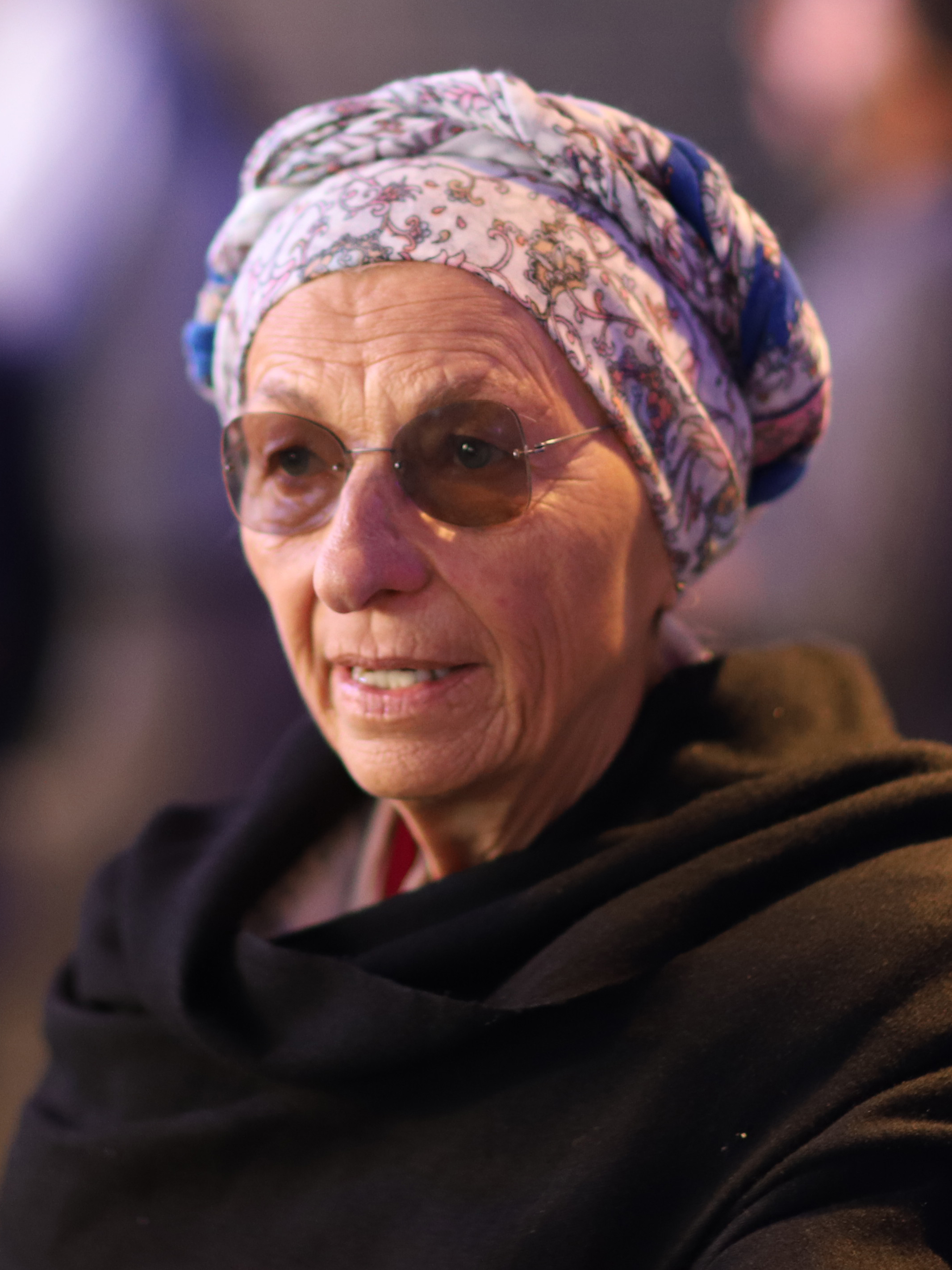
Emma Bonino, former Minister of Foreign Affairs and current leader

In January 2013, the party announced that it would contest the upcoming general election on a stand-alone electoral list called Amnesty, Justice and Freedom (Aministia, Giustizia, e Libertà). In the election, the party received 0.2% of the vote, returning no deputies and senators. However, in April and after two months of failed attempts at forming a new government, thanks to her international standing and Pannella's lobbying efforts, Bonino was sworn in as Minister of Foreign Affairs in the Letta Cabinet. The cabinet lasted until 22 February 2014, when it was replaced by the Renzi Cabinet, which did not include Bonino.

In November 2013, the party elected a new leadership: Bernardini secretary, Laura Arconti president and Valerio Federico treasurer. The party did not take part in the 2014 European Parliament election, partly due to lack of funds.

During the annual party congress in November 2015, Riccardo Magi was elected secretary and Cappato president. Pannella, who did not speak at the congress, opposed the change, while Bonino, who was no longer in good terms with the old leader, did not even take part in the congress. However, in the following months Bonino decided to side with Magi and Cappato, who launched "Radical" lists for the 2016 municipal elections in Rome and Milan, in a move opposed by the leadership of the TRP, especially Maurizio Turco. The lists obtained 1.2% and 1.9%, respectively, and in both cases they supported the candidates put forward by the PD, either in the first or the second round, opening the way for the party's rapprochement with the centre-left at country-level.

=== Pannella's death and split (2016–2017) ===
In May 2016, Pannella, who had long suffered from cancer, died and Italian politicians from across the entire political spectrum paid tribute to him.

In the event, the party found itself increasingly divided in two factions: on one side Magi, Cappato and Staderini (who were backed by Bonino), on the other Turco, Bernardini and most of the staff of Radio Radicale (who were closer to the late Pannella). The former focused more on Italian politics and elections, while the latter were more interested in the activity of the Transnational Radical Party (TRP) and no longer in playing an active role in elections (as suggested by Pannella).

The fracture was evident in September 2016 at the congress of the TRP, during which the faction of Turco and Bernardini soundly beat the other wing. At the November 2016 congress, in turn the RI confirmed Magi as secretary, while electing Antonella Soldo as president.

In February 2017, the TRP severed its ties with the RI (who were accused of boycotting the TRP) and the latter were forced out of the Radical headquarters.

=== Return to Parliament (2017–2020) ===
In November 2017, the RI formed, along with Della Vedova's Forza Europa (FE) and some members of the Civics and Innovators (CI), More Europe (+E), a pro-Europeanist list for the 2018 general election, led by Bonino. +E was part of the centre-left coalition led by Matteo Renzi and the PD.

The list won 2.6% of the vote in the election, falling short of the 3% threshold, but Bonino was elected to the Senate in a single-seat constituency in Rome, Magi to the Chamber also from Rome and Alessandro Fusacchia from the European constituency of Italians abroad. Contextually, the list obtained 2.1% and one regional councillor in the Lombard regional election and 2.1% and one regional councillor also in the 2018 regional election.

In July 2018, +E started to organise itself as a full-fledged party. It was decided that a committee, presided by Gianfranco Spadaccia (a long-time Radical), would lead +E until the founding congress, scheduled for January 2019. The newly formed committee appointed Della Vedova as coordinator. In November, following his election to Parliament, Magi was replaced by Silvja Manzi as secretary; at the same congress Barbara Bonvicini was elected president and Antonella Soldo treasurer. One year later, Manzi, Bonvicini and Soldo were respectively replaced by Massimiliano Iervolino, Igor Boni and Giulia Crivellini.

In August 2019, tensions grew within the coalition supporting the Conte government, leading to the issuing of a motion of no-confidence by the League. During the following government crisis, the M5S and the PD agreed to form a new cabinet together, under outgoing Prime Minister Conte. In September, +E decided not to support the newly formed Conte II Cabinet, despite opposition by Tabacci, Magi and Fusacchia. The three voted in favour of the government in the Chamber, while Bonino voted against it in the Senate. In October, Fusacchia announced he was leaving +E.

In November 2020, Magi and Bonino formed joint sub-groups in the Mixed Groups of the Chamber and the Senate respectively, together with the deputies and senators affiliated with Action, a political party led by Carlo Calenda. The sub-group in the Chamber continued to include "Italian Radicals" in its name.

=== Recent events (2021–present) ===
The party supported the centre-left coalition in the 2022 general election, with no candidates and elects.

The 2023 annual party congress was due in December, but was suspended due to irregularities. The congress was thus rescheduled in January 2024: internal elections were deserted by the party's old guard and, as a result, 20-year-old Matteo Hallissey was elected secretary, 25-year-old Patrizia De Grazia president and 23-year-old Filippo Blengino treasurer.

In March 2024, in the run-up of the 2024 European Parliament election, the party was a founding member of a broad, liberal and pro-Europeanist list named "United States of Europe", along with More Europe, Italia Viva, the Italian Socialist Party and the European Liberal Democrats, in order to overcome the 4% electoral threshold. In late April the list was joined also by L'Italia c'è.

In December 2024, during the party's annual congress, Filippo Blengino was elected secretary and Hallissey president. In February 2025, the latter presented a list at More Europe's fourth congress, obtaining around 11% of delegates, and was finally elected president with 69.5% of the vote, by defeating former More Europe secretary and former Italian Radicals president Della Vedova, who obtained 30.5%.

On 2 November 2026, Blengino resigned as secretary, accusing Matteo Hallissey of using the party to promote himself and its resources to take control of More Europe, of which Hallissey is also president. Blengino also denounced irregularities in party membership registrations, fund mismanagement, a lack of internal democracy, and a lack of transparency regarding a citizens’ initiative bill.

== Ideology ==
According to the party statute, the RI is both a "liberal, liberist and libertarian" party, and a non-ideological, pragmatic, and open movement. The party is the only Italian political movement that consents to dual membership with other parties. The Italian Radicals has been described as representing "the most significant expression" of "libertarianism ... in the Italian context". Libertarianism in this sense is defined as follows: "In emphasising the importance of individual liberty and personal responsibility with respects to all matters, libertarians argued that the only thing that may legitimately be demanded of others is non-interference. Hence, libertarians oppose state intervention to help individuals achieve self-realization (e.g., through welfare measures) or to protect them from themselves (e.g., through legislation against the sale and use of drugs). And on the same grounds they staunchly support private property and unregulated markets." According to Tom Lansford, the party is a mostly libertarian, middle-class political grouping standing for civil and human rights.

The RI claims the legacy of Risorgimento radical-republican figures such as Carlo Cattaneo, Giuseppe Mazzini, and Felice Cavallotti, and 19th-century liberal and socialist intellectuals as Gaetano Salvemini, the brothers Carlo and Nello Rosselli, Benedetto Croce, and party ideologue Ernesto Rossi. Internationally, the RI political thought is influenced by ideas of Martin Luther King Jr., Mahatma Gandhi, Immanuel Kant and Karl Popper.

The Radicals have long adopted referendums to bring political changes. Since 1974, the Radical Party and its successor RI had purposed more than 110 referendums and were successful 35 times. Other political methods have included Gandhi-inspired nonviolence, the Satyagraha, also adopting extreme tactics like hunger strike and, occasionally, thirst strike. Pannella became involved in nonviolence after a long-time association with Aldo Capitini, a pacifist activist nicknamed the "Italian Gandhi".

On fiscal issues, the RI is usually liberal, supporting non-interventionist and free-market policies, but in recent times accepted part of the welfare state system, especially on healthcare. The RI is divided in two wings, i.e., the Friedmanians, who are influenced by Milton Friedman and the Chicago School, and the Keynesians, who support neo-Keynesian or post-Keynesian economics. This divide declined in the 2010s, when it adopted moderate liberal trends on economy.

On social issues, the RI appears as the most progressive party in Italy. The RI fully supports progressive stances including same-sex marriage, LGBT adoption, abortion, artificial insemination and euthanasia, vocally advocating for an advance healthcare directive (AHD). On healthcare, the RI support universal healthcare with possibility to choose between state-managed service and private insurances. The RI also calls for the legalization of prostitution and cannabis while enforcing the fight against hard drugs like heroin with harm reduction methods. On immigration, the RI supports ius soli policy and faster legal integration of regular immigrants, granting them citizenship and the right to vote. The RI criticises sentiment against illegal immigrants, rejecting the "invasion" theory supported by far-rightists. On religious affairs, the RI follows the historical Radical Party's position of anti-clericalism, calling for the abolition of Lateran Treaty (approved in 1929 and modified in 1984) and secularisation. The party is a strong critic of the Catholic-dominated politics, underlining the ghettoisation of religious minorities, including atheists and agnostics.

On foreign affairs issues, the RI has been a keen supporter of European federalism, non-interventionism, Atlanticism and Zionism, while advocating a two-state solution. The party is also a strong supporter of enlargement of the European Union including towards Turkey, Morocco, Israel and Palestine and is a strong opponent of dictatorial-like states such as China, Russia and (formerly) Syria. Despite their non-interventionist tendencies, the RI is not pacifist and supports military action where civil rights are absent and minorities endangered, such as during the Kosovo and Afghanistan wars. The RI had supported several cultural and social mobilisations in support of several persecuted ethnic and religious minorities including the Tibetans, the Uyghurs, the Degar and the Chechens.

== Election results ==
=== Italian Parliament ===
Election	Leader	Chamber of Deputies				Senate of the Republic			
Election	Leader	Votes	%	Seats	+/–	Votes	%	Seats	+/–
2006	Emma Bonino	Into RnP		7 / 630	New	Into RnP		0 / 315	New
2008	Emma Bonino	Into PD		6 / 630	▼1	Into PD		3 / 315	▲3
2013	Marco Pannella	Into AGL		0 / 630	▼6	Into AGL		0 / 315	▼3
2018	Emma Bonino	Into +E		2 / 630	▲2	Into +E		1 / 315	▲1

=== European Parliament ===
Election	Leader	Votes	%	Seats	+/–	EP Group
2004	Emma Bonino	Into Bonino List		2 / 78	New	ALDE
2009	Emma Bonino	Into Bonino-Pannella List		0 / 72	▼2	–
2014	Did not contest			0 / 73	0	–
2019	Emma Bonino	Into +E		0 / 76	0	–
2024	Emma Bonino	Into USE		0 / 76	0	–

== Leadership ==
- Secretary: Daniele Capezzone (2001–2006), Rita Bernardini (2006–2008), Antonella Casu (2008–2009), Mario Staderini (2009–2013), Rita Bernardini (2013–2015), Riccardo Magi (2015–2018), Silvja Manzi (2018–2019), Massimiliano Iervolino (2019–2024), Matteo Hallissey (2024), Filippo Blengino (2024–present)
- President: Benedetto Della Vedova, Rita Bernardini and Luca Coscioni (2001–2003), Luca Coscioni (2003–2006), Maria Antonietta Coscioni (2006–2008), Bruno Mellano (2008–2010), Silvio Viale (2010–2013), Laura Arconti (2013–2014), Riccardo Magi (2014–2015), Marco Cappato (2015–2016), Antonella Soldo (2016–2018), Barbara Bonvicini (2018–2019), Igor Boni (2019–2024), Patrizia De Grazia (2024), Matteo Hallissey (2024–present)
- Treasurer: Danilo Quinto (2001–2003), Rita Bernardini (2003–2006), Elisabetta Zamparutti (2006–2008), Michele De Lucia (2008–2013), Valerio Federico (2013–2016), Michele Capano (2016–2017), Silvja Manzi (2017–2018), Antonella Soldo (2018–2019), Giulia Crivellini (2019–2024), Filippo Blengino (2024), Patrizia de Grazia (2024–present)
- President of the National Committee: Werther Casali (2004–2010), Marco Revelli (2010–2011), Giulia Simi (2011–2013), Michele Capano (2013–2014), Silvio Viale (2014–2015), Antonella Soldo (2015–2016), Manuela Zambrano (2016–2017), Alessandro Massari (2017–2019), Silvio Viale (2020–2021), Dario Boilini (2021–2023), Matteo Giusti (2023–2025), Bruno Gambardella (2025–present)

== Symbols ==
2001–2017

2006 general election

2008 (not used in elections)

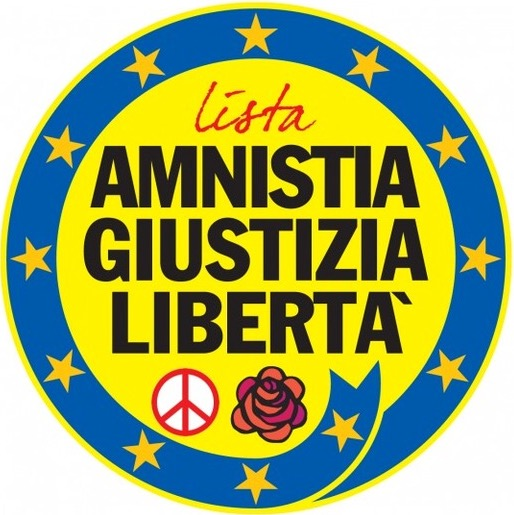
2013 general election

2017–present
