= Emma Bonino =

Italian politician (1948–2026)

Emma Bonino OMRI CdrLH
- Bonino in 2006

Minister of Foreign Affairs
- In office 28 April 2013 – 22 February 2014
- Prime Minister: Enrico Letta
- Preceded by: Mario Monti (Acting)
- Succeeded by: Federica Mogherini

Minister of European Affairs and International Trade
- In office 17 May 2006 – 7 May 2008
- Prime Minister: Romano Prodi
- Preceded by: Giorgio La Malfa (European Affairs)
- Succeeded by: Andrea Ronchi (European Affairs); Claudio Scajola (Development)

European Commissioner for Health and Consumer Protection
- In office 25 January 1995 – 16 September 1999
- President: Jacques Santer; Manuel Marín (Acting)
- Preceded by: Christiane Scrivener
- Succeeded by: David Byrne

Member of the Senate of the Republic
- In office 23 March 2018 – 12 October 2022
- Constituency: Rome
- In office 29 April 2008 – 14 March 2013
- Constituency: Piedmont

Member of the Chamber of Deputies
- In office 28 April 2006 – 28 April 2008
- Constituency: Veneto
- In office 10 July 1990 – 25 January 1995
- Constituency: Naples (1990–1992); Rome (1992–1994); Padua (1994–1995)
- In office 5 December 1986 – 2 July 1987
- Constituency: Naples
- In office 13 June 1979 – 10 July 1983
- Constituency: Rome
- In office 5 July 1976 – 20 December 1978
- Constituency: Rome

Member of the European Parliament
- In office 20 July 1999 – 27 April 2006
- Constituency: North-West Italy (1999–2004); North-East Italy (2004–2006)
- In office 17 July 1979 – 12 April 1988
- Constituency: North-West Italy

Personal details
- Born: 9 March 1948 Bra, Piedmont, Italy
- Died: 11 September 2026 (aged 78) Rome, Lazio, Italy
- Party: Italian Radicals (2001–2017); More Europe (2017–2026)
- Other political affiliations: Radical Party (1975–2017); Pannella List (1989–1996); Bonino List (1999–2004)
- Education: Bocconi University
- Website: emmabonino.it

Emma Bonino (9 March 1948 – 11 September 2026) was an Italian politician who was a senator for Rome between 2008 and 2013, and again between 2018 and 2022. She also served as Minister of Foreign Affairs from 2013 to 2014. Previously, she was a Member of the European Parliament and a member of the Chamber of Deputies. She served in the second Prodi government of Italy as Minister of International Trade from 2006 to 2008. She was European Commissioner for Health and Consumer Protection in the Santer Commission (1995–1999).

Bonino was a leading member of the Italian Radicals, a political party which describes itself as "liberale, liberista, and libertario", where liberista denotes economic liberalism and libertario denotes a form of cultural liberalism concerning moral issues, with some ideological connection with historical left-libertarianism. She graduated in modern languages and literature from Bocconi University in Milan in 1972. A veteran legislator in Italian politics and an activist for various reform policies, she was elected six times as a deputy and two times as a senator. She was the leader of More Europe, a liberal, European federalist party list she launched in December 2017, ahead of the 2018 Italian general election.

== Early life and education ==
Bonino was born in Bra, Piedmont, on 9 March 1948. She graduated in Literature from Bocconi University in Milan with a master thesis on Malcolm X's autobiography.

== National political career ==
Bonino was elected to the Italian Chamber of Deputies in 1976 and reelected in 1979, 1983, 1987, 1992, 1994 and 2006. In 1975, she founded the Information Centre on Sterilisation and Abortion and promoted the referendum which led to the legalisation of abortion in Italy. In 1986, she was among the promoters of a referendum against nuclear energy that led to the rejection of a civil nuclear energy programme in Italy.

On 17 May 2006, Bonino was appointed minister for international trade in the cabinet of Romano Prodi. She resigned from office on 7 May 2008 when she had been elected vice president of the Senate the previous day. In 2008, at the elections of 13 and 14 April, she was elected to a seat in the Senate, the second parliamentary chamber, on the list of the Democratic Party for the Piedmont constituency.

On 28 April 2013, she was sworn in as foreign minister in the government led by Enrico Letta. In June 2017, public opinion polls of her stood at 43 per cent, second only to prime minister Paolo Gentiloni. Despite the positive public opinion, her party fell short of the 3 percent required for a seat in Parliament. In response, she adopted the slogan "Love Me Less, Vote Me More." She was elected to the Senate of the Republic in the constituency of Rome – Gianicolense district at the 2018 general election.

== International political career ==
Bonino was elected to the European Parliament in 1979 and re-elected in 1984 and 1999. She served as the Secretary of the Transnational Radical Party in 1993–94 and the party's president in 1991–1993. In October 1994, she was appointed head of the Italian Government delegation to the UN General Assembly for the "Moratorium on death penalty" initiative. From 1994 to 1999, she was European Commissioner responsible for Consumer Policy, Fisheries and the European Community Humanitarian Office (ECHO). In this role, she played a part in the 1995 Turbot War as head of the delegation of the European Commission. As a result of this, the total allowable catch of fish awarded to the EU was significantly reduced. In 1997, her field of competence was widened to include consumer health protection and food safety.

From 14 to 17 May 1998, Bonino participated in the annual meeting of the Bilderberg Group at Turnberry, Scotland. On 15 March 1999, together with all the Santer Commission, she resigned due to the accusations of fraud and mismanagement against commissioner Édith Cresson. The final report, however, levelled charges against most commissioners, including Bonino herself. In November 2002, she was appointed Head of the Italian Government delegation at the Inter-governmental Conference of the Community of Democracies in Seoul.

Along with Marco Pannella, another member of the Radical Party, Bonino fought numerous battles for civil rights and individual liberty, mainly concerned with divorce, the legalisation of abortion, the legalisation of drugs, and sexual and religious freedoms. She fought for an end to capital punishment, against female genital mutilation, and the eradication of world hunger. In 1975, Bonino funded the information centre for abortion (CISA), and in 1997 she supported the international movement condemning the discrimination against females in Afghanistan, Un Fiore per le Donne di Kabul (A Flower for the Women of Kabul). Bonino was also a champion of the recognition of women's rights in the countries of the African Union through the Maputo Protocol. She was a founder of the nongovernmental organizations No Peace Without Justice, which supports the international protection and promotion of human rights and democracy, and Nessuno Tocchi Caino (Let None Strike Cain), which is an international league that fights for the abolition of the death penalty.

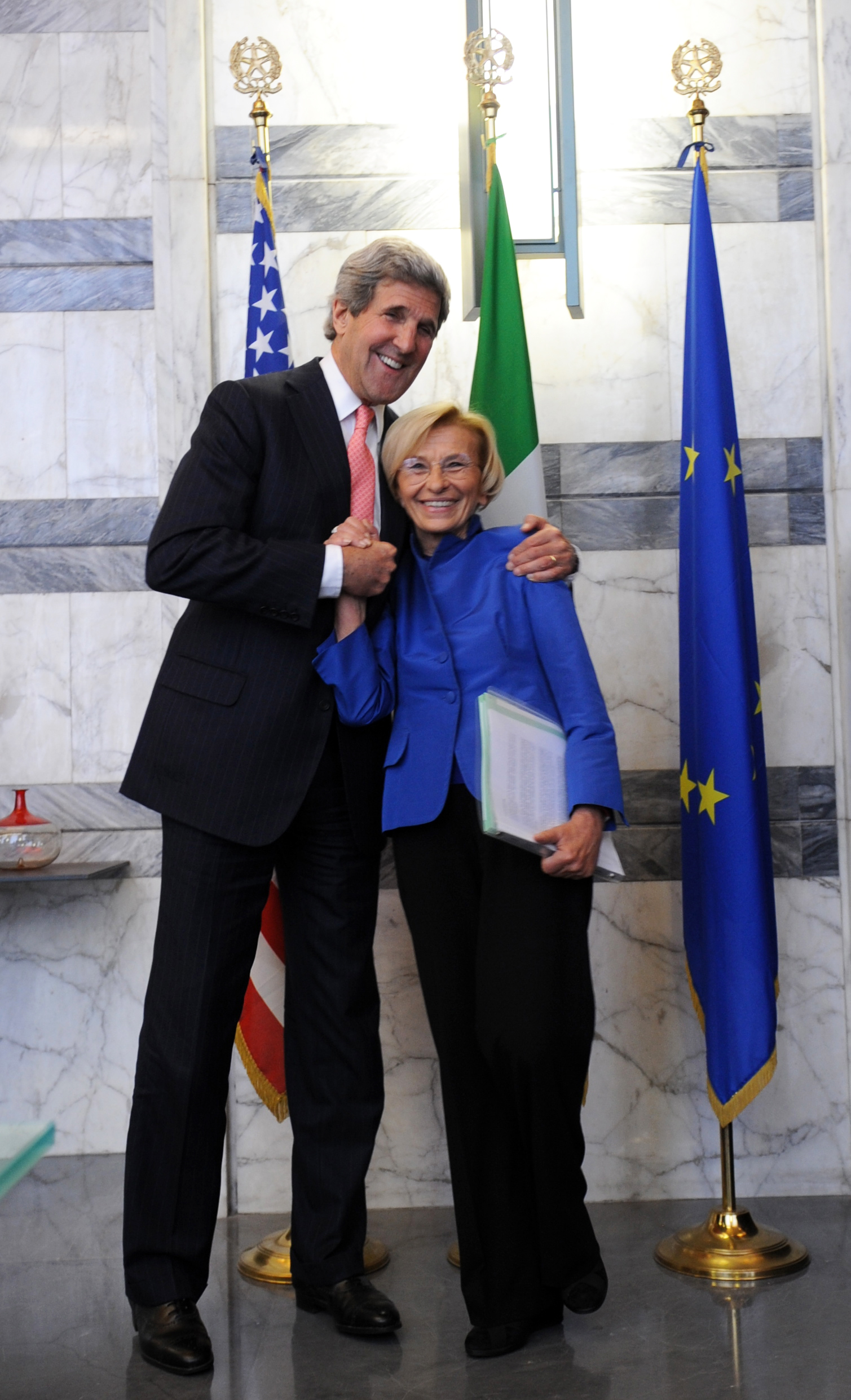
Bonino with the U.S. Secretary of State John Kerry, before their meeting in Rome

In June 1999, she obtained a historic percentage of votes (8.5%) in the European elections (vs. the usual 2–3% that Radicals got in the previous and subsequent elections). Her list (Lista Bonino) won seven of 78 Italian seats in this election. She supported the NATO intervention in Kosovo in the spring of 1999. From 1999 to 2004, the Lista Bonino was non-affiliated, as it was founded with a claim to not adhere to the traditional centre-left versus centre-right politics, rather remaining in the middle to maximize any potential bargaining power. In the case Emma Bonino and Others v Parliament and Council (Case T-40/04), the Emma Bonino List contested before the Court of Justice of the European Union that its exclusion from Community funding due to not qualifying as a party on the 'European level' was discriminatory. The court dismissed this argument as inadmissible, establishing that measures do not necessarily need to legally affect an applicant in order for the case to directly affect them. Since 2004, it is part of the ALDE group.

In 2002, Bonino, in cooperation with the Associazione Italiana Donne per lo Sviluppo (AIDOS, Italian Association for the Development of Women), called an Italian Parliament meeting to discuss genital mutilation. Bonino led the proceedings, which gathered medical experts, ambassadors, and politicians to review graphic information about the practice of female genital mutilation in African countries. During this meeting, Bonino recounted her travels through Somalia, Egypt, Tanzania, The Gambia, and Ethiopia, where she learned about these rural practices by meeting women who participated in projects to stop them. Many African women who suffered from genital mutilation discussed their first-hand experiences. At the conclusion of the meeting, Prime Minister Silvio Berlusconi congratulated Bonino on her accomplishments in this cause and presented the leader of AIDOS with a check for the European Campaign.

In December 2001, she moved to Cairo with the objective of learning the Arabic language and culture. In March 2003, she started a daily review of the Arabic press on Radical Radio. In January 2004, she organised the "Regional Conference on Democracy, Human Rights and the role of the International Penal Court", the first for an Arab country. She was a board member of the Arab Democracy Foundation.

Bonino was a board member of DARA until December 2012. In 2016, she was appointed by Erik Solheim, the Chairman of the Development Assistance Committee, to serve on the High Level Panel on the Future of the Development Assistance Committee under the leadership of Mary Robinson. She wrote opinion editorials and commentaries for both the Inter Press Service News Agency and Project Syndicate, discussing contemporary international issues including Syrian refugees affecting Europe, abolishing the death penalty, relations between Iran and Europe, and the poor treatment of the indigenous people of Southeast Asia.

== Philanthropy and charitable causes ==
Bonino (far left) pictured in the Senate in 2019

Bonino was a member of the eminent international Council of Patrons of the Asian University for Women (AUW) in Chittagong, Bangladesh. The University, which is the product of foundational partnerships (Bill and Melinda Gates Foundation, Open Society Foundation, IKEA Foundation, etc) and regional cooperation, serves women from 15 countries across Asia and the Middle East. During an interview published by the Italian daily Corriere della Sera on 8 February 2016, Pope Francis defined Bonino as one of the nation's "forgotten greats", comparing her to great historical figures such as Konrad Adenauer and Robert Schuman.

== Recognition ==
Knight Grand Cross of the Order of Merit of the Italian Republic – awarded on 21 December 2015

In 1999 Bonino was one of the two winners of the North-South Prize, an award that honors individuals with accomplishment in the protection of human rights, pluralistic democracy, and improvement of North-South relations. For her battles and engagements with controversial issues, and her engagement in the promotion of human rights and civil rights in the world, she received the "Open Society Prize 2004" and "Prix Femmes d'Europe 2004" for Italy. Bonino received the America Award of the Italy-USA Foundation in 2013, and she was also recognized as one of the BBC's 100 women in the same year.

== Personal life and death ==
Bonino never married nor had children. In 1975, she surrendered to Italian authorities after having had an illegal abortion. Bonino fostered children. She was a godmother of Countess Luana, elder daughter of Prince Friso and Princess Mabel of Orange-Nassau. On 12 January 2015, Bonino announced on Radio Radicale she was suffering from lung cancer and was being treated with chemotherapy, although she also stated she was not abandoning her political activity. On 21 May 2015, on the same radio station, she announced her cancer was in complete remission. In October 2023, Bonino appeared on the interview program Belve, and announced she had healed. However, Bonino died of complications from small-cell carcinoma on 11 September 2026, at the age of 78.

== Electoral history ==
Election	House	Constituency	Party	Votes	Result
1976	Chamber of Deputies	Rome–Viterbo–Latina–Frosinone	PR	12,855	Elected
1979	Chamber of Deputies	Rome–Viterbo–Latina–Frosinone	PR	33,595	Elected
1979	European Parliament	North-West Italy	PR	51,445	Elected
1983	Chamber of Deputies	Naples–Caserta	PR	7,797	Not Elected
1984	European Parliament	North-West Italy	PR	28,319	Elected
1987	Chamber of Deputies	Naples–Caserta	PR	6,515	Not Elected
1992	Chamber of Deputies	Rome–Viterbo–Latina–Frosinone	LP	3,470	Elected
1994	Chamber of Deputies	Padua	LP	36,881	Elected
1999	European Parliament	North-West Italy	LB	421,770	Elected
2004	European Parliament	North-East Italy	LB	50,281	Elected
2006	Chamber of Deputies	Veneto 2	RnP	– (Note: Elected in a closed list proportional representation system.)	Elected
2008	Senate of the Republic	Piedmont	RI (Note: Elected in the Democratic Party list.)	–	Elected
2018	Senate of the Republic	Rome	+E	112,425	Elected
2022	Senate of the Republic	Rome	+E	182,239	Not Elected

=== First-past-the-post elections ===
1994 general election (C): Veneto — Padua
Candidate	Coalition or Party	Votes	%
Emma Bonino	Pole of Freedoms (LP)	36,881	39.5
Guido Petter	Alliance of Progressives (PDS)	25,706	27.5
Elisabetta Gardini	Pact for Italy	19,265	20.6
Franco Perlasca	National Alliance	11,511	12.3
Total		93,363	100.0

2018 general election (S): Rome — Gianicolense
Candidate	Coalition or Party	Votes	%
Emma Bonino	Centre-left coalition (+E)	112,425	38.9
Federico Iadicicco	Centre-right coalition (FdI)	92,808	32.1
Claudio Consolo	Five Star Movement	54,380	18.8
Laura Lauri	Free and Equal	15,661	5.4
Others		13,819	4.8
Total		289,093	100.0

2022 general election (S): Rome — Municipio XIV
Candidate	Coalition or Party	Votes	%
Lavinia Mennuni	Centre-right coalition (FdI)	199,228	36.3
Emma Bonino	Centre-left coalition (+E)	182,239	33.2
Carlo Calenda	Action - Italia Viva (Az)	77,211	14.1
Alessandra Maiorino	Five Star Movement	62,079	11.3
Others		28,019	5.1
Total		548,776	100.0

Political offices
Preceded by Raniero Vanni d'Archirafi	European Commissioner from Italy; 1995–1999; Served alongside: Mario Monti	Succeeded by Mario Monti
Preceded by Antonio Ruberti	European Commissioner from Italy; 1995–1999; Served alongside: Mario Monti	Succeeded by Romano Prodi
Preceded by Christiane Scrivener	European Commissioner for Health and Consumer Protection; 1995–1999	Succeeded by David Byrne
Preceded by Giorgio La Malfa as Minister of European Affairs	Minister of European Affairs and International Trade; 2006–2008	Succeeded by Andrea Ronchi as Minister of European Affairs
Preceded by Giorgio La Malfa as Minister of European Affairs	Minister of European Affairs and International Trade; 2006–2008	Succeeded by Claudio Scajola as Minister of Economic Development
Preceded by Mario Monti; Acting	Minister of Foreign Affairs; 2013–2014	Succeeded by Federica Mogherini
