= Liberalism and radicalism in Italy =

Political ideology in Italy

Liberalism and radicalism have played a role in the political history of Italy since the country's unification, started in 1861 and largely completed in 1871, and currently influence several leading political parties.

During the first decades of Italy as a united country, the main parliamentary parties included liberals, but it was not until 1877 that the left-wing Radical Party was established as the first organized liberal party. The more centrist Liberals followed in 1913. Most liberal and radical parties were banned in 1926 under Benito Mussolini's Fascist government.

After World War II and the establishment of the Italian Republic there have been frequent changes in the configuration of political parties and, for the most part, the representation of liberal and radical views has been split among a number of parties that may also espouse other views. These parties have often been part of governing coalitions.

During the so-called "First Republic" three minor liberal parties were active: the Italian Liberal Party (centre-right), the Italian Republican Party (centre-left) and the modern-day Radical Party (centre-left). More recently, liberals have been split primarily among the centre-right The People of Freedom/Forza Italia and the centre-left Democratic Party.

== Overview ==
In the 19th century both early Italian political groupings, the Historical Right and the Historical Left, were composed of monarchist liberals and functioned mainly as loose parliamentary groups, while radicals organised themselves as the Radical Party, and republicans, who were influenced also by socialism, as the Italian Republican Party. These two parties had in fact been part of The Extreme, which included also the Italian Socialist Party and its predecessors. In 1913 the liberals around Giovanni Giolitti joined forces in the Liberals grouping (also known as Liberal Union) and in 1922 the Italian Liberal Party is formed. In that period, other liberal parties emerged: the Constitutional Democratic Party, the Democratic Liberal Party (merger of the Radicals with other liberal groups), and the Italian Social Democratic Party.

When Benito Mussolini's National Fascist Party came to power in 1922, some Liberals and Radicals flirted with Fascism, but, ultimately, a Fascist regime was established and all the parties, notably including the Italian Liberal Party and the Italian Republican Party, were banned.

After the end of World War II, both Liberals and Republicans reorganised themselves, followed by more liberal parties in the upcoming decades (notably including the new Radical Party), and, despite their modest results in elections, they were often part of the Italian government, in alliance with Christian Democracy. In the 1940s, during the resistance movement and the writing of the republican Constitution, an important role was played by the Action Party, a social-liberal, republican and liberal-socialist outfit, successor of the Justice and Freedom movement. In this phase the Liberals adhered to conservative liberalism and Republicans to social liberalism.

Since 1992–1994, following the Tangentopoli scandals, the subsequent Mani pulite inquiries and the resulting shake-up of the Italian party system, the liberal movement has been strongly divided. As a result, a broad group of parties, not all included here, started to use the "liberal" label.

Italian liberals are basically divided between the centre-right Forza Italia (successor of the former Forza Italia, itself primarily a merger of liberal and Christian-democratic forces, and The People of Freedom, which integrated the more conservative National Alliance) and the centre-left Democratic Party (a merger of social democrats, progressive Christian democrats and social liberals, the latter two mainly organised in Democracy is Freedom – The Daisy in the early 2000s).

Minor liberal parties include, among others, Civic Choice, the Italian Radicals (ALDE Party and Liberal International member), the aforementioned Italian Republican Party (which stretched a long way from the far-left to the centre-right of the political spectrum), and Act to Stop the Decline (a party which is the standard-bearer of a more classical- and libertarian-oriented form of liberalism). Also the centrist-populist Italy of Values was a member of the ALDE Party, but it is hardly a liberal party.

From 1994 on, most Liberals and several Republicans joined Forza Italia and the other parties of the House of Freedoms coalition. This is the reason why the term "liberal" is more often used when speaking of the centre-right than the centre-left. A new Italian Liberal Party was launched in 1997, but, as the Italian Republican Party, it survives as a very minor party. The former two, Civic Choice, Act to Stop the Decline and minor groups joined forces in European Choice, with disappointing results, in 2014.

== Timeline of parties ==
=== The Italian Liberal Party ===
- 1848: Camillo Benso di Cavour forms the Moderate Party, a conservative-liberal parliamentary group, within the Parliament of the Kingdom of Sardinia.
- 1849: The Left, a left-liberal parliamentary group, is formed in the Parliament of the Kingdom of Sardinia.
- 1861: The Historical Right, a parliamentary group sometimes referred to as Liberal Constitutional Party or Liberals, is formed as the successor of the Moderate Party. The Left starts to be known as Historical Left, while its members are frequently referred to as Democrats.
- 1913: Giovanni Giolitti's "Liberal Left", heir of the Historical Left, is organised as Liberals, while its left wing forms the Constitutional Democratic Party (PDC) and Democratic Party (PD).
- 1919: The PDC, the PD and other liberals, in opposition to Giolitti, form an electoral list named Italian Social Democratic Party (PDSI) for the 1919 general election.
- 1921: Giolitti's Liberals incorporate the National Fasci of Combat in its National Blocs for the 1921 general election.
- 1922: Giolitti's Liberals, conservative liberals and remnants of the Historical Right (by then called Liberal Conservatives) form the Italian Liberal Party (PLI).
- 1924: Giolitti's Liberals are integrated in the Fascist-dominated National List in the 1924 general election, while anti-fascist liberals form the National Union (UN).
- 1926: Both the PLI and the UN are banned by the Fascist government.
- 1943: Former members of the old PLI re-organise the Italian Liberal Party (PLI).
- 1946: The PLI is part of an electoral list named National Democratic Union (UDN) in the 1946 general election. A faction opposed to this form the Progressive Liberal Movement (MLP) which merge into PRI soon after.
- 1948: The PLI join forces with the Common Man's Front in the National Bloc (BN) in the 1948 general election.
- 1953: A group of PLI splinters form the National Democratic Alliance (ADN).
- 1955: The PLI's left-wing forms the Radical Party (see below).
- 1993: A fraction of the PLI's right-wing forms the Union of the Centre (UdC), while splinters form the Liberal Democratic Union (ULD) and the Liberal Left.
- 1994: The PLI is disbanded. Other than aforementioned spin-offs, the Federation of Liberals (FdL) and the Italian Liberal Right (DLI), which is integrated into National Alliance (see below), are formed. Several Liberals join either Forza Italia (see below) or the Segni Pact (see below).
- 1995: The ULD is merged into the FdL.
- 1996: The FdL joins the Democratic Union (see below).
- 1997: Some of Forza Italia's Liberals form the Liberal Party (PL).
- 1998: The UdC is merged into Forza Italia.
- 2004: Splinters from the FdL form the Association for Liberal Democracy, which would join Democracy is Freedom – The Daisy (see below), whilst the PL, along with members of the DLI (briefly known as Liberals for Italy) and former members of the UdC, re-establishes the Italian Liberal Party (PLI).
- 2007: The Liberal Left joins the Democratic Party (see below).
- 2011: The DLI joins The People of Freedom (see below).
- 2014: Splinters from the PLI and other former Liberals form The Liberals, a short-lived experience.
- 2018: The PLI forms an alliance with the Lega Nord, within the centre-right coalition.
- 2019: The PLI leaves the alliance with the Lega Nord and the DLI splits from PLI.
- 2020: The Liberals join forces with Action and More Europe.

=== The historical Radical Party ===
- 1877: Progressive liberals form the Radical Party (PR) within The Extreme parliamentary group.
- 1904: The PR is officially founded, under the leadership of Ettore Sacchi.
- 1921: The PR merges with several minor liberal parties to form the Democratic Liberal Party (PLD).
- 1922: Some Radicals join forces with former PDC liberals within the PDSI.
- 1926: The PR/PLD is banned, but many members remain politically active through the resistance movement.
- 1943: Former PDSI members, along with former members of the Italian Reformist Socialist Party (PSRI), form the Labour Democratic Party (PDL).
- 1946: Former Radicals and the PDL join the UDN for the 1946 general election.
- 1948: The PDL merges into the Italian Democratic Socialist Party (PSDI).

=== The Italian Republican Party ===
- 1895: The Italian Republican Party (PRI) is formed by followers of Giuseppe Mazzini.
- 1926: The PRI is banned, but continues its activities in exile.
- 1942: Republicans take part to the foundation of the Action Party (PdA).
- 1943: The PRI is re-organised in Italy.
- 1946: The PdA's liberal wing forms the Republican Democratic Concentration (CDR), which is merged into the PRI, another wing forms the Italian Republican Alliance (ARI) which vanishes soon after.
- 1947: The PdA is dissolved and officially joins the Italian Socialist Party (PSI).
- 1952: PRI splinters form Popular Unity (UP).
- 1964: PRI splinters form the Democratic Union for the New Republic (UDNR).
- 1994: The PRI aligns with the Segni Pact (see below), while a splinter group forms the Republican Left (SR).
- 1996: The PRI joins the Democratic Union (see below), but soon distances from it
- 1998: The SR is merged into the Democrats of the Left (see below).
- 2001: The PRI makes an alliance with Forza Italia (see below), provoking the split of the European Republicans Movement (MRE).
- 2004: A group of splinters form the Democratic Republicans (RD).
- 2011: The MRE and the RD re-join the PRI.
- 2018: The PRI forms a pact with the Liberal Popular Alliance.
- 2020: The PRI joins forces with Action and More Europe.
- 2020: The MRE is re-established as an independent party.
- 2022: The PRI briefly joins Civic Commitment and later joins Italia Viva, in alliance with Action; the MRE joins the PD-led Democratic and Progressive Italy list.
- 2024: The PRI continues its alliance with Action.

=== From the Radical Party to the Italian Radicals ===
- 1955: The PLI's left-wing faction, led by Marco Pannella, forms the Radical Party (PR).
- 1982: The Radical Federative Movement (MFR) splits from the PR and would later merge into the PSI.
- 1988: The PR is transformed into Transnational Radical Party (PRT).
- 1989: The PRT is organised at the Italian-level as Antiprohibitionists on Drugs.
- 1992: The PRT is organised at the Italian-level as Pannella List.
- 1994: Pannella List's members are elected with Forza Italia in the 1994 general election.
- 1999: The PRT is organised at the Italian-level as Bonino List.
- 2001: The PRT is organised at the Italian-level as Italian Radicals, a full-fledged party.
- 2005: The party joins forces with the Italian Democratic Socialists in the Rose in the Fist, an electoral coalition. The right-wing libertarian faction leaves to form the Liberal Reformers (RL), which would become an associate party of Forza Italia (see below) and finally merge into The People of Freedom (see below).
- 2007: A splinter group forms Decide!, which would later merge into The People of Freedom (see below).
- 2008: The party contests the 2008 general election in a joint list with the Democratic Party (see below).
- 2009: The party contests the 2009 European Parliament election as Bonino-Pannella List.
- 2013: The party contests the 2013 general election with a list named Amnesty, Justice and Freedom.
- 2017: The PRT and the RI part ways.
- 2017: Forza Europa (FE), led by Benedetto Della Vedova is formed.
- 2018: The RI, Forza Europa and the Democratic Centre join forces in More Europe.
- 2019: +Eu is transformed into a party, with the Italian Radicals, FE and the CD as its founding associate parties.
- 2020: +Eu, abandoned by the CD, joins forces with Action, ALI and the Italian Republican Party.
- 2022: +Eu breaks its alliance with Action; some Radicals, led by Marco Cappato, form the Referendum and Democracy list; the RI joins the PD-led Democratic and Progressive Italy list.

=== Forza Italia, The People of Freedom and offshots ===
- 1993: Forza Italia (FI) is founded by media-tycoon Silvio Berlusconi. Most Liberals, several Christian Democrats and a few Republicans join the party. Though some of its members retain their membership of the European Liberal Democrat and Reform Party, FI would join the European People's Party in 1999.
- 1994: The Liberal Democratic Pole (PLD) merges into FI.
- 1998: The UdC merges into FI.
- 2003: Liberals within FI form Popular Liberalism, a liberal faction.
- 2007: Silvio Berlusconi announces the creation of The People of Freedom (PdL), a party merging FI with the more conservative National Alliance (AN) and other parties of the House of Freedoms, notably including the Liberal Reformers, Decide! and the Liberal Democrats (see below).
- 2009: FI is officially merged into the PdL.
- 2010: Former members of AN and some liberals too leave FI to form Future and Freedom (FLI).
- 2013: Silvio Berlusconi announces the revival of FI. Subsequently, the PdL is folded into the new Forza Italia (FI). A minority of FI's liberals take part to the creation of the New Centre-Right, an alternative, predominantly Christian-democratic party.
- 2015: Some of FI's liberals take part to two successive splits, Conservatives and Reformists (CR) and Liberal Popular Alliance (ALA).
- 2017: The CR launches a new centre-right party named Direction Italy (DI). SC, F!, the PLI, liberal splinters from Popular Alternative and DI form Us with Italy (NcI) for the 2018 general election allied with the centre-right coalition.
- 2017: Energies for Italy (EpI), led by Stefano Parisi and including former members of FI and Giannino, is formed.
- 2019: Splinters from FI launch a new centre-right liberal party, Cambiamo! (C!). NcI becomes a party.
- 2020: EpI is dissolved.
- 2020: Cambiamo! and Identity and Action form Coraggio Italia (CI).
- 2022: C! and IDeA leave CI and form Italy in the Centre (IaC), CI dissidents form Vinciamo Italia joining IaC.
- 2023: IaC is merged into Us Moderates (NM).

=== From Democratic Alliance to the Democratic Party ===
- 1992: Democratic Alliance (AD) is launched as a proposed coalition of centre-left political parties.
- 1993: AD is officially founded, by former PRI, PSI, PCI and DC members. Soon after, Mario Segni leaves to form the Segni Pact.
- 1994: AD takes part to the Alliance of Progressives, while the Segni Pact to the Pact for Italy.
- 1996: The social-liberal Democratic Union (UD) and the centrist-liberal Italian Renewal (RI) are formed. AD joins the former, the Segni Pact the latter.
- 1999: The Democrats, a centrist and social-liberal party, is formed by the union of the UD with Romano Prodi's supporters (some of which splinters from the Christian-democratic Italian People's Party, PPI). For its part, the Segni Pact forms an alliance with AN.
- 2002: The Democrats, the PPI and RI merge into Democracy is Freedom – The Daisy (DL)
- 2003: The Segni Pact is re-organised as Pact of Liberal Democrats (PLD).
- 2007: DL is merged with the social-democratic Democrats of the Left (DS) to form the Democratic Party (PD).
- 2007: A group of DL splinters form the Liberal Democrats (LD).
- 2008: Liberals within the PD form Liberal PD, a liberal faction.
- 2009: A group of PD splinters form Alliance for Italy (ApI).
- 2012: Leading members of ApI form the Democratic Centre (CD).
- 2019: Liberal splinters from the PD form Action (Az) and Italy Alive (IV).
- 2020: Action joins forces with More Europe and the Italian Republican Party.
- 2022: Action and IV join forces. MRE, Italian Radicals and Volt join PD's Democratic and Progressive Italy alliance.

=== Minor liberal, social-liberal and libertarian parties ===
- 2012: A group of intellectuals, led by Oscar Giannino, form the libertarian-oriented Act to Stop the Decline (FiD), originally "Stop the Decline".
- 2013: Civic Choice (SC) is launched as an electoral list in support of Mario Monti, the incumbent non-partisan Prime Minister, to contest the 2013 general election. The list includes members from Future Italy (IF), a liberal think tank, and is part of the With Monti for Italy coalition. After the election, SC becomes a full-fledged party, while FiD finds a new leader in Michele Boldrin. Splinters from FiD, led by Giannino, form the Liberal Democratic Alliance for Italy (ALI).
- 2014: SC, FiD, ALI, CD, the PRI, the new PLI, The Liberals and other minor parties contest the 2014 European Parliament election within a list named European Choice, in support of the ALDE Party candidate for President of the European Commission, Guy Verhofstadt.
- 2015: Unique Italy (IU), including former members of IF, SC and the PdL, is formed. A splinter group from Lega Nord forms Act! (F!). Several SC's liberals join the PD.
- 2016: IU is dissolved. SC, which has suffered the split of the Civics and Innovators (CI), forms a federative pact with the ALA.
- 2018: Volt Italy (Volt) is formed.
- 2024: Ora! is formed.
- 2025: The Liberal Democratic Party (Italy) (PLD) is formed.

== Liberal leaders ==
- Before 1861: Alessandro Manzoni, Carlo Cattaneo
- Historical Right / Liberal Conservatives: Massimo d'Azeglio, Camillo Benso di Cavour, Bettino Ricasoli, Alfonso Ferrero La Marmora, Luigi Federico Menabrea, Giovanni Lanza, Marco Minghetti, Antonio Starabba di Rudinì, Luigi Pelloux, Sidney Sonnino, Luigi Luzzatti
- Historical Left / Democrats: Urbano Rattazzi, Benedetto Cairoli, Agostino Depretis, Francesco Crispi, Giovanni Giolitti, Giuseppe Saracco, Alessandro Fortis
- Historical Radical Party: Agostino Bertani, Felice Cavallotti, Ernesto Nathan, Ettore Sacchi, Francesco Saverio Nitti, Giovanni Amendola
- Liberals / Italian Liberal Party: Giuseppe Zanardelli, Giovanni Giolitti, Antonio Salandra, Paolo Boselli, Vittorio Emanuele Orlando, Luigi Facta, Benedetto Croce, Alberto Giovannini, Luigi Einaudi, Bruno Villabruna, Manlio Brosio, Leone Cattani, Gaetano Martino, Bruno Leoni, Giovanni Malagodi, Aldo Bozzi, Agostino Bignardi, Valerio Zanone, Alfredo Biondi, Renato Altissimo, Raffaele Costa, Egidio Sterpa, Antonio Martino, Beatrice Rangoni Machiavelli
- Italian Republican Party: Randolfo Pacciardi, Oronzo Reale, Ugo La Malfa, Oddo Biasini, Giovanni Spadolini, Giorgio La Malfa, Giorgio Bogi, Luciana Sbarbati
- Radical Party / Italian Radicals: Mario Pannunzio, Leopoldo Piccardi, Bruno Villabruna, Marco Pannella, Gianfranco Spadaccia, Angiolo Bandinelli, Adelaide Aglietta, Adele Faccio, Sergio Stanzani, Emma Bonino, Francesco Rutelli, Marco Cappato, Benedetto Della Vedova, Daniele Capezzone, Riccardo Magi
- Forza Italia / The People of Freedom / Forza Italia: Silvio Berlusconi, Alfredo Biondi, Raffaele Costa, Egidio Sterpa, Antonio Martino, Giulio Tremonti, Marcello Pera, Franco Frattini, Renato Brunetta, Sandro Bondi, Giancarlo Galan, Stefania Prestigiacomo, Paolo Romani, Benedetto Della Vedova, Daniele Capezzone
- Democratic Alliance / Democratic Union / Democracy is Freedom / Democratic Party: Willer Bordon, Ferdinando Adornato, Antonio Maccanico, Valerio Zanone, Giorgio Bogi, Francesco Rutelli, Enzo Bianco, Paolo Gentiloni, Gianni Vernetti, Linda Lanzillotta, Matteo Renzi, Sandro Gozi, Andrea Marcucci, Luciana Sbarbati, Beatrice Rangoni Machiavelli, Pietro Ichino, Stefania Giannini, Carlo Calenda, Andrea Romano
- Civic Choice: Pietro Ichino, Linda Lanzillotta, Stefania Giannini, Carlo Calenda, Andrea Romano, Bendetto Della Vedova, Enrico Zanetti
- More Europe: Emma Bonino, Benedetto Della Vedova, Gianfranco Spadaccia, Marco Cappato, Riccardo Magi

== See also ==
- Berlusconism
- History of Italy
- List of liberal theorists, including:
  - Niccolò Machiavelli (1469–1527)
  - Benedetto Croce (1866–1952)
- List of political ideologies
  - Liberalism
    - Classical liberalism
    - Conservative liberalism
    - Cultural liberalism
    - Economic liberalism
    - National liberalism
    - Social liberalism
  - Liberism
  - Libertarianism
  - Classical radicalism
- List of political parties in Italy
- Politics of Italy
