= Italian Radicals (disambiguation) =

The Italian Radicals are a liberal political party in Italy, formed in 2001.

In politics, Italian Radicals may also refer to:

- Italian Radical Party, a far-left/left-liberal party (1877–1922)
- Radical Party, a left-liberal party splintered from the Italian Liberal Party (1955–1989)
- Transnational Radical Party, the transnational evolution of the Radical Party (1989–present)
- Antiprohibitionists on Drugs, electoral list (1989–1992)
- Pannella List, political association (1992–present) and electoral list (1992–1999)
- Bonino List, electoral successor of the Pannella List (1999–2004)
- Coscioni List, radical list that never ran in elections (2005)
- Rose in the Fist, electoral list (2006 general election)
- Bonino-Pannella List, electoral list (2009 European Parliament election)
- Amnesty Justice Freedom List, electoral list (2013 general election)

In architecture and design, Italian Radicals refers also to the Radical movement, 1965–1975

== See also ==
- Radical Federative Movement, a Radical splinter party (1982–1985)
- Liberal Reformers, a Radical splinter party (2005–2009)
