= Luca Coscioni =

Italian economist and politician (1967-2006)

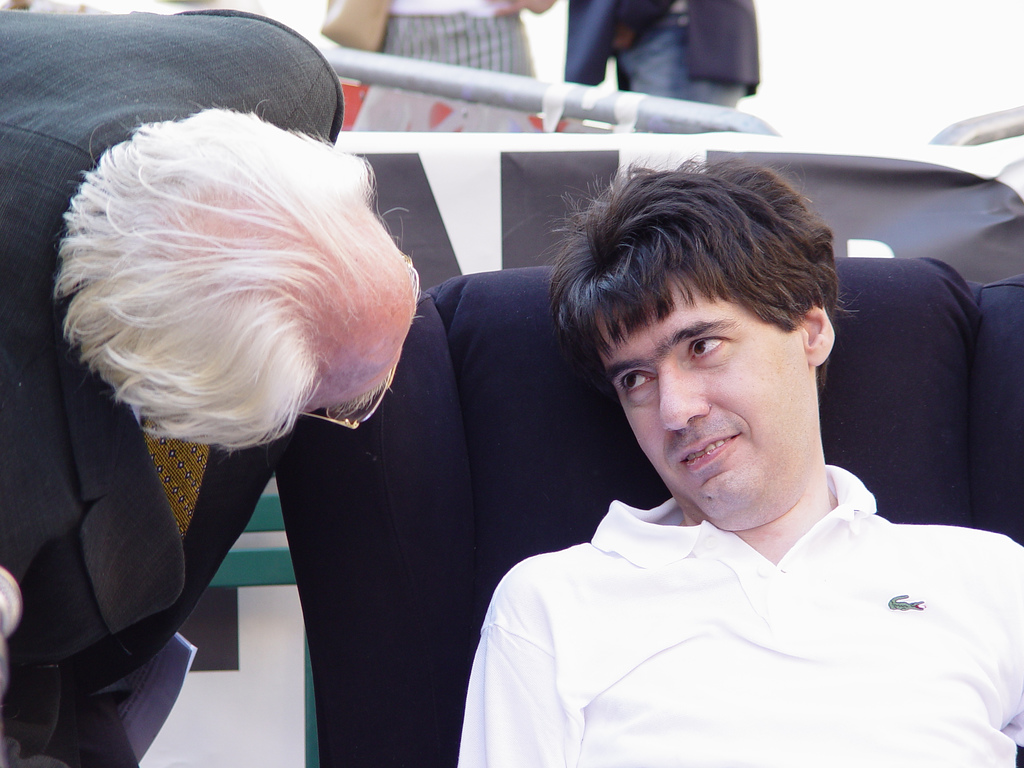
Luca Coscioni (right) with Marco Pannella

Luca Coscioni (16 July 1967 – 20 February 2006) was an Italian economist and politician. He was a professor of Environmental Economics at Università della Tuscia (Italy) who engaged very actively in the social and political spheres with the political organization Partito Radicale and with the Luca Coscioni Association (LCA), which he presided over from 2002 to 2006. His life was marked by amyotrophic lateral sclerosis (ALS) which claimed his life at the age of 38.

== Education and university career ==
Coscioni was born in Orvieto. He specialized in classical studies at the Liceo Ginnasio Statale F.A. Gualtiero of Orvieto and then he studied Economics and Trade at the Rome-based University La Sapienza, where he graduated in 1991 with the maximum vote. His degree thesis addressed the commercial relationship between the West and the developing world. The following year he was awarded a research doctorate in "Mountain Economy" at the university of Trento where he started his research activity. He deepened his work by holding a seminar in the Department of Economic and Evaluative Sciences of the University of Viterbo on forestal and agrarian development. In those years, he became increasingly interested in social and political areas, though seen through the lens of economics. In 1994 he started lecturing on "Consumers' Behaviour" and held in depth courses of Political and International Economy. Afterwards, he began to collaborate with an influential French institute based in Nancy.

After a year, Coscioni became a professor of Environmental Economics at the University of Viterbo. Simultaneously, he started to get involved in local politics in his native Viterbo as member of the city council.

== Luca Coscioni Association for the freedom of scientific research ==
In 1995, while training himself for the New York City Marathon, Coscioni was diagnosed with ALS. He therefore decided to quit his public post. Coscioni entered a painful phase of his life in which he was seen by many doctors of different clinics. The diagnosis confirmed that he was affected by the disease. Coscioni was thus condemned to a progressive deterioration of his muscles which had made him a wheelchair user and rendered him unable to speak and to eat autonomously.

He decided to go back to political life and in 2000, Coscioni decided to bring his health situation to the general public as a political case denouncing the lack of appropriate regulation and public funding to allow scientific research, in particular the one on embryonic stem cells, in Italy.

== Political engagement ==
Coscioni was attracted by the ideas of Partito Radicale, a political organization affiliated with Marco Pannella's Nonviolent Radical Party, transnational and transparty. He acknowledged he understood that the libertarian struggles animated by the Radical Party were similar to the one he wanted to lead, namely the struggle for freedom of research. In that same year, he was elected - through the internet - member of the General Council of Radicali Italiani. Speaking at the council, the radical voters discovered a new leader.

At the 2001 Italian parliamentary elections, Coscioni ran for the Chamber of Deputies in the same list of former European Commissioner Emma Bonino. On that occasion the Nobel Laureate for Literature Josè Saramago wrote him a message to add his support to the one expressed by scores of scientists and Nobelists saying that "perhaps the support of a mere writer like me will seem a little or a lot out of place in a list of scientific leaders who, with their names and their prestige, seal the words spoken by Luca Coscioni. In any case, my name is at your disposal, so that the light of reason and human respect can illuminate the gloomy spirits of those who believe themselves to be, still and always, the masters of their destinies. For a long time we waited for the day to break, we were exhausted by the waiting, until all of a sudden the courage of a man, rendered silent by a terrible disease, gave us renewed strength".

Though Coscioni was not elected to Chamber of Deputies, he received the support of hundreds of scientists, physicians, patients as well as politicians and intellectuals. Later in that year, a similar show of support accompanied his unsuccessful bid to become a member of the National Bioethics Committee.

On 20 September 2002, together with Emma Bonino and Marco Pannella, Coscioni founded his association in order to promote freedom of scientific research, with particular attention to research on embryonic stem cells, a technique that was running the risk of being severely hindered by a draft bill before the Italian Senate. After the adoption in February 2004 of the bill that prohibited embryonic stem cells research, and strictly limited in vitro fertilization in Italy, the LCA and the Italian Radicals launched a referendum campaign to repeal it. The referendum was voted upon in June 2005, despite an overwhelming majority of those that voted supported the proposal to radically amend the law, the referendum did not reach the quorum of 50% necessary for the vote to be valid.

In the run-up to the 2005 regional elections, Coscioni headed a radical list which carried his own name. However, neither the centre-left coalition, nor the centre-right coalition hosted Coscioni's list and due to the electoral system it was excluded from the competition.

Later on, to better coordinate, and institutionalize, her international activities, the LCA promoted the creation of an international network to promote freedom of scientific research. A first meeting was organized in Rome to launch a World Congress for the Freedom of Scientific Research, which was convened in Rome at the city's Capital Hill from 16 to 18 February 2006 at the presence of scientists, researchers, politicians and advocates coming from all over Europe and the United States. The meeting was opened by Coscioni with a video message. That was his last public appearance, on the eve of the filing of candidates for the Italian Parliament where he was supposed to head the list of the newly founded party of the "Rose in the Fist", an alliance of Liberals, Socialists and Radicals.

== Death ==
Coscioni died in the morning of 20 February 2006. He was in his home in Orvieto. Marco Pannella learned about his death from Coscioni's wife, Maria Antonietta Farina Coscioni and announced the event on the very morning on Radio Radicale. Coscioni and his wife would hold a reunion with the Party officials every morning in order to continue and improve the struggle for freedom of research.

Coscioni's struggle for scientific research might have been far from unanimously shared in the country, yet it was widely regarded as a fundamental and heroic one. Indeed, Coscioni was unquestionably a symbol for many people. Emma Bonino said "he was the person who like no other embodied the idea of life of right for the right to life"; Marco Pannella described Coscioni as "a leader always at the forefront"; Walter Veltroni asserted that "Luca Coscioni offered his bitter destiny and sorrow to a cause which saw him as the consistent protagonist".

Following his wishes, Coscioni's body was cremated and his ashes was scattered into the sea in the area of Porto Santo Stefano, off the coast of Monte Argentario, near the Isola del Giglio, Tuscany, where he loved sailing before the disease had struck him.
