= Associazione Luca Coscioni =

Luca Coscioni Association for the freedom of scientific research
- Founded: September 2002
- Founder: Luca Coscioni
- Legal status: Non-profit organization
- Purpose: Human rights, Science, Freedom of scientific research.
- Location: Italy.
- Key people: Luca Coscioni, Marco Pannella, Marco Perduca
- Website: www.associazionelucacoscioni.it

The Luca Coscioni Association for the freedom of scientific research was founded on September 20, 2002, by Luca Coscioni, who had amyotrophic lateral sclerosis and was a member of the Italian Radical Party who promoted the campaign for the freedom of scientific research on embryonic stem cells.

== Background and history ==
In 2001 he was the head of the list of Radical candidates in the political elections and received the support of 51 Nobel Prize Laureates worldwide. In 2005, the Association launched the pro-referendum campaign aimed at abrogating Law 40 which imposed a ban on assisted fertilization and on research on embryonic stem cells, by collecting the signatures of over a million voters. Although the referendum query obtained a majority of votes, it was cancelled for not obtaining the required quorum pursuant to the pro-abstention campaign promoted by the Italian Catholic Church and by many political parties.

The Association is also promoter of the World Congress for Freedom of Scientific Research, an international platform of scientists, patients and citizens.

In 2006, it played a leading role in the legal and political battle in favour of euthanasia and of the principle of a “Biological Testament” (Living Will) promoted by Piergiorgio Welby, the President of the Association, who suffered from progressive muscular dystrophy. After having addressed an open letter to the Italian President of the Republic and having filed a petition with the competent Court to respect his will to die, Piergiorgio Welby died on December 20, 2006, after having received sedation and being disconnected from mechanical pulmonary ventilation thanks to an act of civil disobedience organized by the Luca Coscioni Association.

== See also ==
- Italian Radical Party
- Nonviolent Radical Party
- Marco Pannella
- Luca Coscioni
- Academic freedom
- euthanasia
- civil disobedience
