= Aglietta =

Aglietta is an Italian surname. Notable people with the surname include:

- Adelaide Aglietta (1940–2000), Italian politician
- Michel Aglietta (1938–2025), French economist
