= Angiolo Bandinelli =

Italian politician (1927–2022)

Member of the Chamber of Deputies of Italy
- In office 2 October 1986 – 1 July 1987

Secretary of the Radical Party
- In office 1971–1973
- Preceded by: Roberto Cicciomessere
- Succeeded by: Giulio Ercolessi
- In office 1969–1970
- Preceded by: Mauro Mellini
- Succeeded by: Giulio Ercolessi

Personal details
- Born: 21 March 1927 Chianciano Terme, Italy
- Died: 6 February 2022 (aged 94)
- Party: PR

Angiolo Bandinelli (21 March 1927 – 6 February 2022) was an Italian politician, journalist and writer.

== Biography ==
A poet and translator, from his youth he was divided between his love of literature and his passion for journalism and politics.

Before becoming an adult, he was part of the resistance and joined the Partito d'Azione at a very young age and, a few years later, the Radical Party.

He was one of the first adherents of the Radical Party and for which he later served as secretary, between 1969 and 1972; he served as treasurer for a five-year period.

A student of Pantaleo Carabellese, he contributed to Mario Pannunzio's "Mondo," a periodical in which he published about fifty articles. From the early 1960s onward he promoted, animated and directed many party publications ("Agenzia Radicale," La Prova Radicale and Notizie Radicali above all).

He served as a municipal councillor in Rome, and as a national deputy from 1986 to 1987.

Beyond his political activity, Bandinelli was a columnist for various publications including Il Mondo and Il Foglio, a translator, a poet and an essayist.

He died on 6 February 2022, at the age of 94. In 1979 he was elected city councilor in Rome, causing a stir by civil disobedience, during which he went so far as to offer a marijuana cigarette to the then mayor of the capital city, Petroselli.

On October 2, 1986, he was proclaimed deputy, during the 9th Legislature, replacing the resigning Gianfranco Spadaccia. A translator of Eliot, Coleridge, Stevenson, author of essays, poems and articles related to party theory and history, he collected many of his contributions in the book The unpunished radical.

In recent years, he was frequently hosted as a columnist and columnist in numerous newspapers and periodicals, including Il Foglio, L'Avanti, L'Opinione and Il Riformista; many of these speeches were published in another volume (Opinioni per un anno, edited by Gualtiero Vecellio).

== Life and career ==
A co-founder and longtime member of the Radical Party, Bandinelli was one of the closer collaborators of Marco Pannella.

== Artworks ==
The Precluded Imagination (1982) Figures, New Notebooks of San Gimignano (1987) Picco del Circeo, Alice's Books (1992) Sermons '63 (1993) Fine de Roma and other poems, Alternative Print, Millelire (1994) The Slutty, Mobydick (1998) M.O. (1999) Fine of Rome (2000) The Big Blue Carp (2001) De Notte Roma (2005) Two Pulp Tales, Alice's Books (2011) Cruel Gardens, Pendragon (2014) I, Heather, Alice's Books (2014) Seven Women, Emiliano degli Orfini - Rome (2015) Heather, Alice's Books (2015) Boy and Girl, I Libri di Alice (2017) Gospel Stories, Gilead Editions (2017) Soho. Two stories in exotic sauce, Galaad Edizioni (2021) The pearl. Senechian Fable, Gilead Editions (2021)
