= Montagnards in MACV-SOG =

Montagnard people in U.S. military service

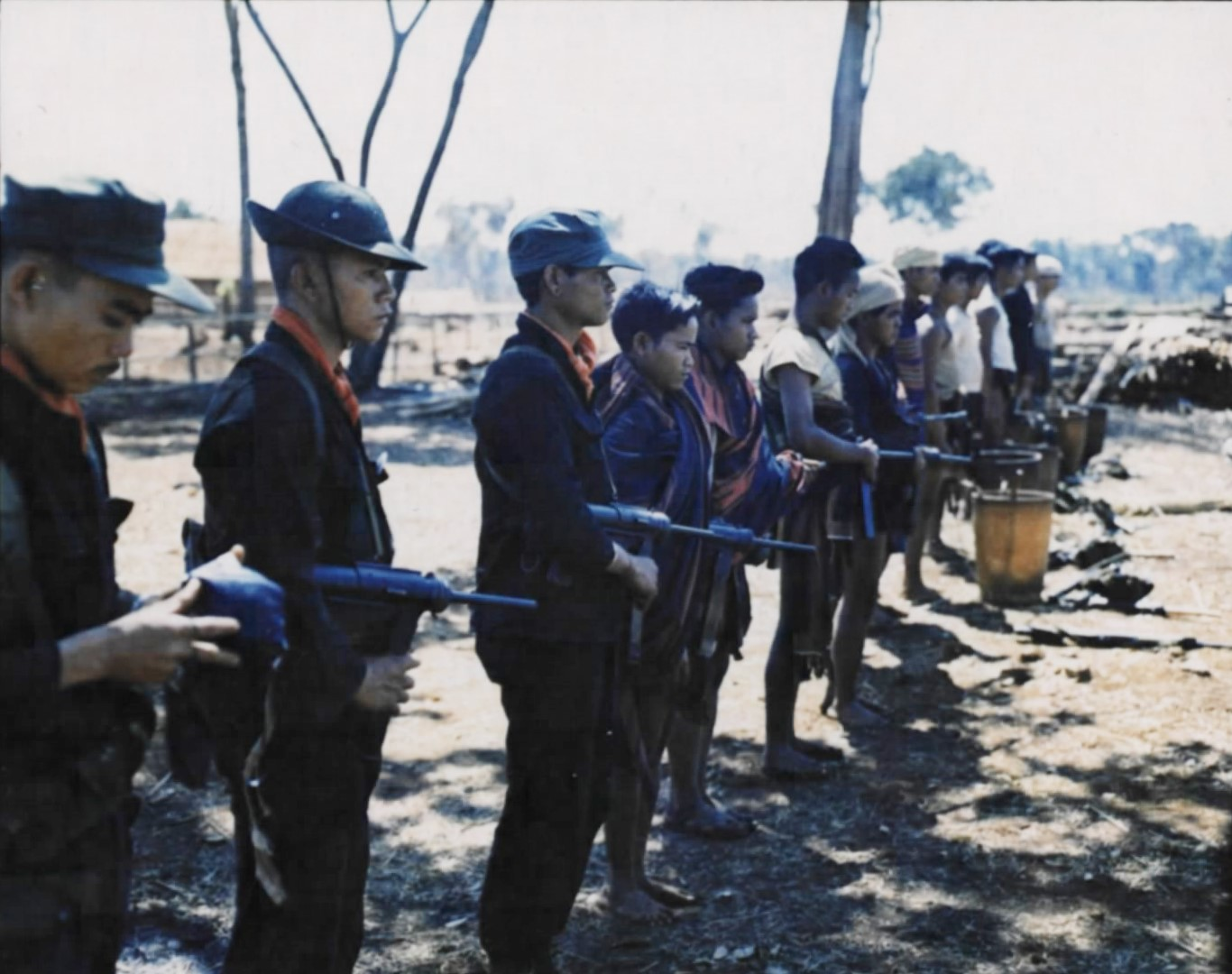
Montagnard commandos prepare for a patrol into Viet Cong territory, 1963

Montagnard tribesmen were recruited into Military Assistance Command, Vietnam – Studies and Observations Group (MACV-SOG) during the Vietnam War and were employed as mercenaries to serve alongside United States Army Special Forces teams. Montagnard personnel would serve as scouts, guides, skirmishers, and also as light infantry when assigned to larger SOG elements such as Hatchet Forces (company-sized reaction elements).

Montagnards were generally viewed very favorably by those they fought alongside and were ultimately considered to be "close allies" by American forces. American military personnel often referred to Montagnards as "Yards," a contraction of the proper pronunciation of "Montagnard" (/ˌmɒn.tənˈjɑːrd/, MON-tən-YARD).

Montagnards were granted refugee status within the U.S. in 1992, and now form a diaspora in the Southeastern United States; Greensboro, North Carolina is the home of the Montagnard Foundation, an organization which lobbies on behalf of the Montagnard people.

== Recruitment ==
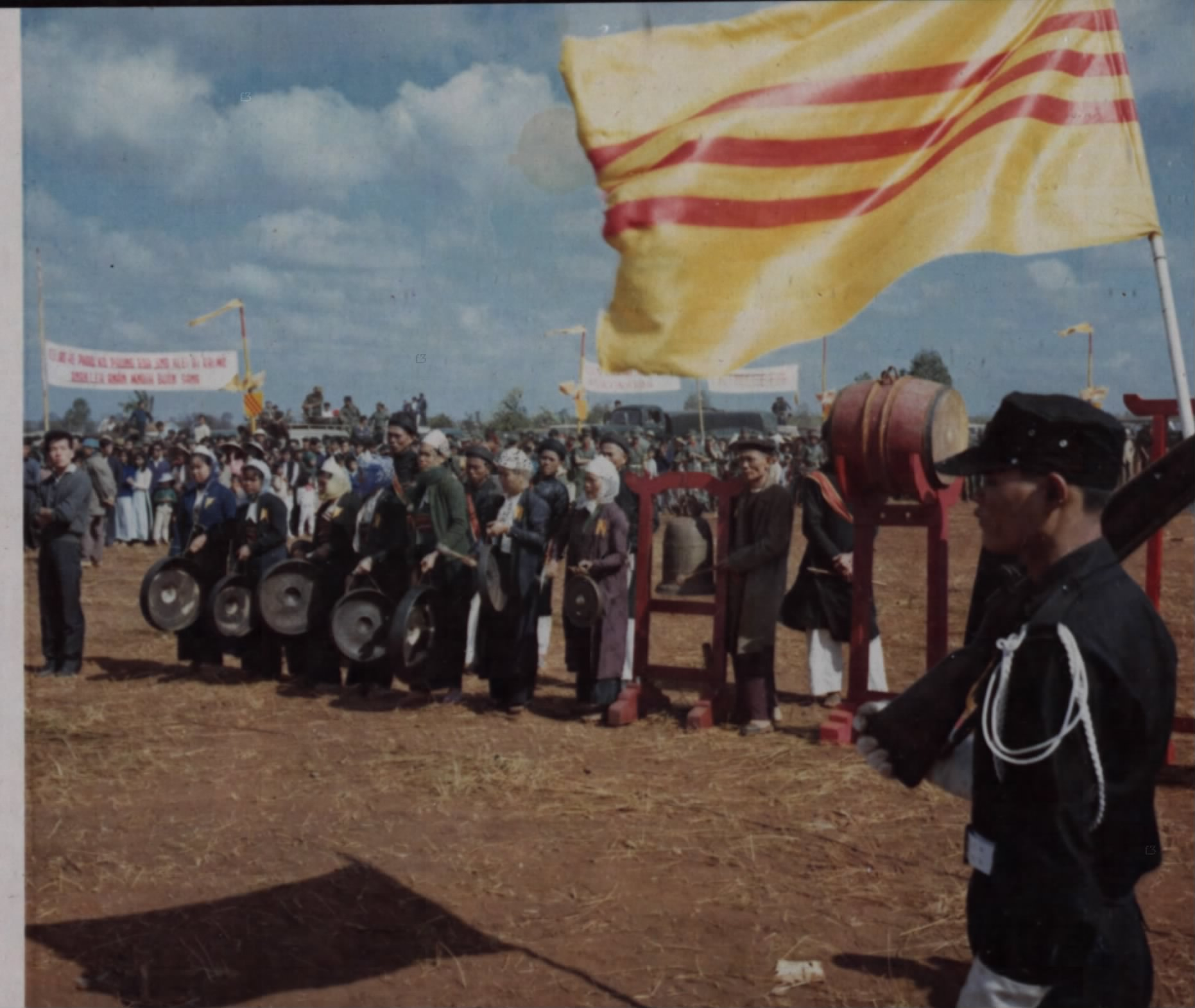
Honor guard and traditional Vietnamese band present at a 1965 ceremony where Montagnard militias swear an oath of allegiance to the South Vietnamese state; Note the flag of South Vietnam in the upper-right

The Studies and Observation Group (SOG) expanded in 1966, creating a need to recruit more individuals in order to fill new reconnaissance units. To fill this need, the SOG commander, Colonel Donald D. Blackburn, looked to the Montagnards as a viable option due to a warrior-nature that was already extant among specific Montagnard tribes. Many in Special Forces had also worked with Montagnards previously in the various border camps as part of the CIDG program and were familiar with their capabilities. American SOG members Jim Hetrick and J.D. Bath were sent on one of the initial trips to recruit Montagnard warriors from their villages. Montagnard fighters in SOG were well-paid, with the lowest-ranking individual receiving a paycheck equivalent to an ARVN captain's pay. Besides pay, many Montagnards were motivated to join SOG simply for an opportunity to fight against the People's Army of Vietnam and Viet Cong. Many of the Montagnard tribes had been infiltrated by Viet Cong agents, subjecting the Montagnards to varying degrees of oppression from propaganda to outright armed attacks.

== Montagnards on SOG reconnaissance teams ==
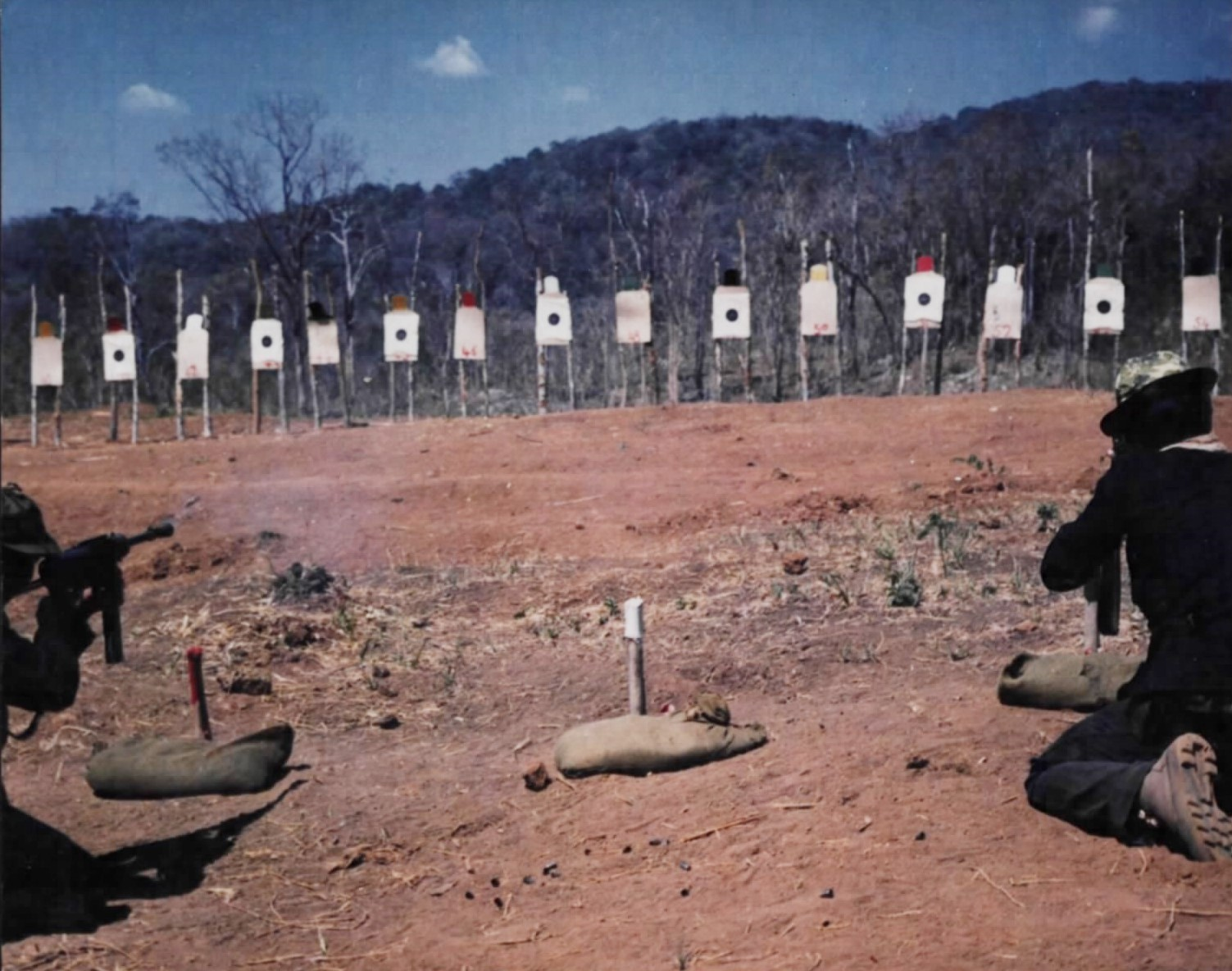
Montagnard commandos training with the M3A1 submachine gun

Once recruited, Montagnard volunteers were brought to one of two (later three) "Command and Control" locations; Command and Control North (CCN), Command and Control Central (CCC), or Command and Control South (CCS.) Here, Montagnards were assigned to reconnaissance teams, which were distinguished by the ethnicity and tribe of the indigenous mercenaries that manned it. Each recon team had 2-3 American Green Berets, who were responsible for training the Montagnard warriors who would be on their team. There were anywhere from 4 to 9 Montagnards on a recon team that was going on a mission. The Montagnards would often fill the role of point man and rear security of the recon team, sometimes even dressing in North Vietnamese Army (NVA) uniforms to cause confusion among any NVA that they came upon. With the deeply clandestine nature of the Studies and Observations Group, there are not clear data figures given, though many SOG veterans attribute the Montagnards to be the largest indigenous mercenary group in SOG. For the same reason, there is no official number for the amount of Montagnards killed in action while serving with SOG.

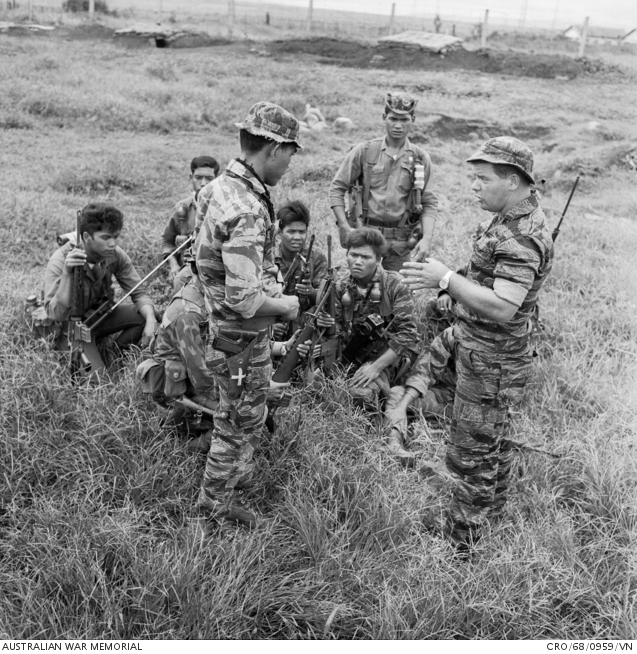
Montagnard personnel receive instruction from a warrant officer of the Australian Army (right), 1968

== Montagnards after SOG and post-war ==
The American side of SOG was deactivated on April 30, 1972. An attempt to transfer leadership to the ARVN ultimately failed. The fall of Saigon to the North on April 30, 1975, led to Montagnards facing continuous persecution from the Socialist Republic of Vietnam.

Flag used to represent the Montagnard people

Pockets of Montagnard resistance against the Communist government continued through 1992, when the George H. W. Bush administration (a result of heavy Vietnam veteran pressure in Congress) began the first of many Montagnard refugee moves to the United States. Since then, the Montagnard population in the United States has grown considerably, with regions such as North Carolina becoming a cultural center for the Montagnard people. Montagnard service to the United States via their service in SOG, has gained a growing recognition in the United States as monuments and exhibits have been created to recognize the Montagnard people.
