= Demba Traoré (politician) =

Malinese politician and lawyer

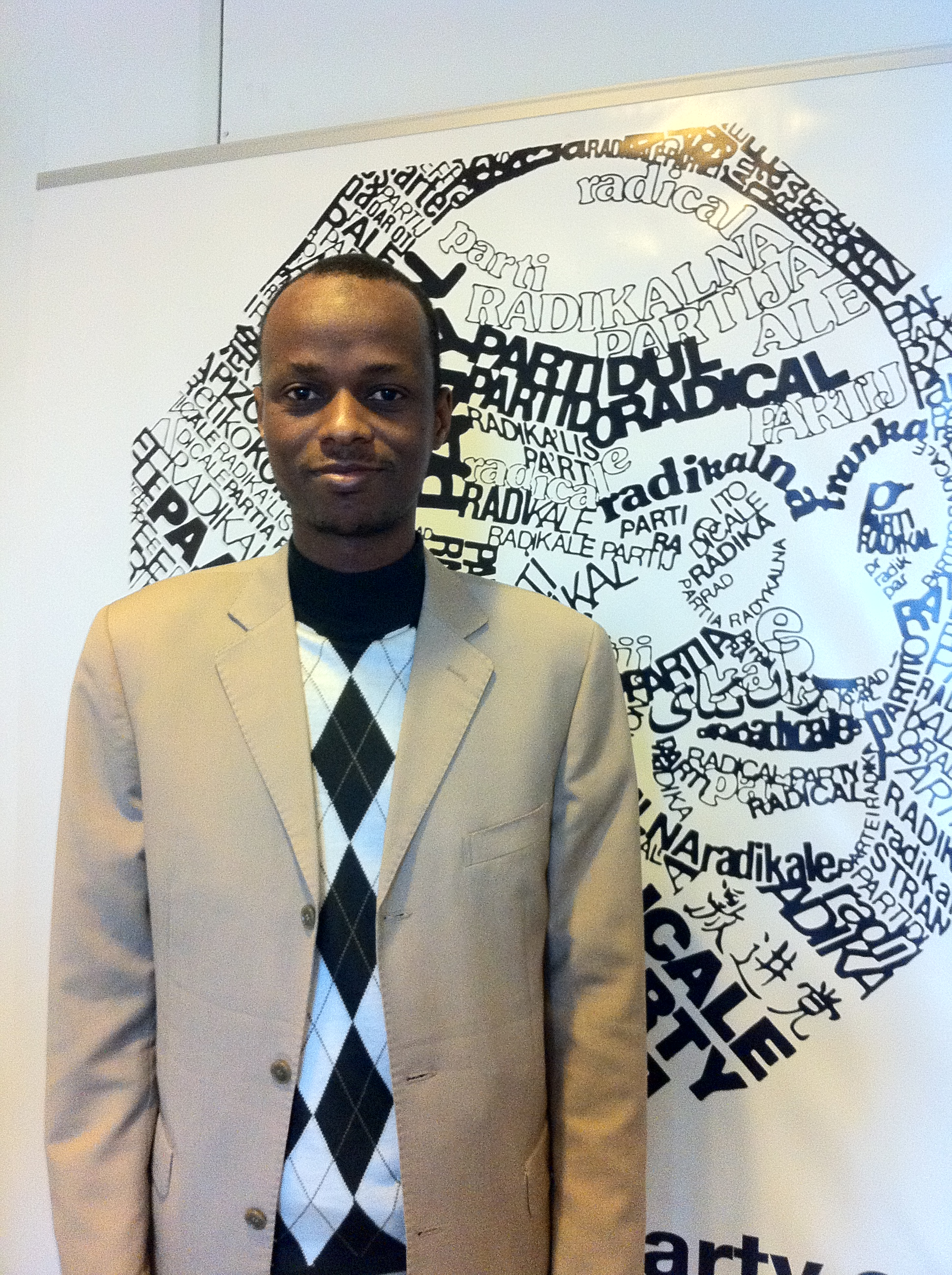
Demba Traoré in the Rome office of the Nonviolent Radical Party, Transnational and Transparty

Demba Traoré (born in Markala, 29 August 1972), is a Malian politician and lawyer. In December 2011, in Rome, he was elected secretary of the Transnational Radical Party.

== Background ==
Traoré has been a member of the Transnational Transparty Nonviolent Radical Party since 2002. When he has been elected at the second session of the party's 39th summit, besides long standing members of the Radical Party, like Marco Pannella and Emma Bonino, the summit was attended inter alia also by guest speakers like Bernard Kouchner and Joschka Fischer.

Demba Traoré has been lawyer since 1995 and was Member of Parliament in the National Assembly of Mali from 2002 through 2007. He was president of the Parliamentarian Commission of Justice as well as judge of the High Court of Justice.

== Personal life ==
Traoré is muslim. He is married and has four children.
