= Transnational Radical Party =

Political association that adopts nonviolent means for civil rights

Nonviolent Radical Party Transnational and Transparty
- Abbreviation: TRP or NRPTT
- Predecessor: Radical Party (Italy)
- Formation: 1 January 1989
- Founder: Marco Pannella
- Founded at: Rome
- Type: Nonprofit NGO
- Legal status: Active
- Purpose: Defense of personal and collective freedoms, human, civil and political rights
- Headquarters: Via di Torre Argentina 76, 00186 Rome
- Region served: Worldwide
- Methods: Nonviolence, lobbying
- Fields: Politics
- Members: 3,308 (2018)
- Secretary: Maurizio Turco
- President: Diego Sabatinelli
- Treasurer: Irene Testa
- Subsidiaries: Radio Radicale FM (Italy)
- Affiliations: Pannella List (Italy); Certi Diritti (Italy); Hands Off Cain (Italy); Charter 97 (Belarus); Esperanto Radikala Asocio (Belgium); ¡Basta Ya! (Spain); Montagnard Foundation (Vietnam); Quê Me (Vietnam); Law Enforcement Action Partnership (UK); DRCNet Foundation / StoptheDrugWar.org (USA)
- Website: www.partitoradicale.it www.radicalparty.org www.nrptt.org

The Transnational Radical Party (TRP), whose official name is Nonviolent Radical Party, Transnational and Transparty (NRPTT), is a political association of citizens, members of parliament and members of government of various national and political backgrounds who intend to adopt nonviolent means to create an effective body of international law with respect for individuals, human, civil and political rights, as well as the affirmation of democracy and political freedom in the world. The TRP does not participate in elections and, despite being named "party", is a non-governmental organization (NGO), with consultative status at the Economic and Social Council (ECOSOC) of the United Nations (UN) since 1995, adept in building synergies among political forces aimed at achieving the goals of its congressional motions.

The TRP is the direct evolution of the Radical Party, a political party in Italy, active from 1955 to 1989, and is a separate entity from the once-connected Italian Radicals party, founded in 2001 as PRT's section in the country. The TRP often advocates the international use of Esperanto in its literature.

== History ==
The TRP's forerunner, the Radical Party (PR), was established in 1955 by a left-wing splinter group from the centre-right Italian Liberal Party (PLI), under the leadership of Marco Pannella. In 1989, the PR was transformed into the TRP. In 1992, a majority of Italy's Radicals formed, at the national-level in Italian politics, the Pannella List. Since 1999, Radicals ran in elections under the banner of Bonino List, named after Emma Bonino. After a breakthrough in the 1999 European Parliament election, Italy's Radicals formed the Italian Radicals (RI).

=== Background and foundation ===
In the 1979 European Parliament election, the first in which voters voted directly for the European Parliament, the PR obtained its best result ever countrywide (3.7% of the vote, resulting in the election of three MEPs, including Pannella). Following the election, the PR was involved with the Coordination of European Green and Radical Parties (CEGRP) and its unsuccessful efforts to create a single pan-European platform for green and radical politics. More importantly, since then, the party projected itself into international politics.

In 1988, after a decade during which transnational issues and values were emphasised, the PR's congress decided that the party would be transformed during 1989 into the TRP and that the latter would not present itself in elections (in order to avoid competition with the other parties and stimulate cooperation instead), while permitting "dual membership" with other parties. The new symbol featuring the stylised face of Mahatma Gandhi was the point of no return in the transformation of the PR into an instrument of political fight completely at disposal of issue-oriented campaigns.

All this provoked great controversy among Radicals. Some long-time members left in order to continue their own activity in other parties or retire from public life. However, also most TRP Radicals continued to be actively engaged in politics, sometimes supported by the TRP itself, sometimes seeking hospitality in traditional parties or creating entirely new electoral lists. In the 1989 European Parliament election Pannella stood as a successful candidate of the joint list between the PLI (his former party) and the Italian Republican Party, some Radicals formed the "Anti-prohibition List on Drugs" (1 MEP), while others joined the Rainbow Greens (2 MEPs). In the run-up of the 1992 general election the Pannella List was formed.

Sergio Stanzani and Emma Bonino were the first secretary and president of the party, respectively. In 1993 Bonino, who would be appointed to the European Commission in 1995, replaced Stanzani, and Pannella became president.

=== International activities and ECOSOC recognition ===
The TRP was soon involved in comparing the conditions of the rule of law among different democracies throughout the world. While its members and economic resources continued to come primarily from Italy, the party strengthened its activities worldwide, especially in the countries of post-communist Eastern Europe. In this respect, the TRP launched the Multilingual Telematics System, one of the first bulletin board systems in Italy to allow multiple connections at the same time with the many countries where the party had influence and membership.

In 1995, after an intense institutional work, the TRP became a non-governmental organization for the promotion of human rights' legislation and the affirmation of democracy and freedom worldwide. As such, it was granted the general consultative status at the Economic and Social Council (ECOSOC) of the United Nations (UN).

Also in 1995, Olivier Dupuis, a long-time Radical from Belgium and founding member of the TRP who had moved to Budapest, Hungary in 1988 and from there had coordinated TRP's activities in Eastern Europe, was elected secretary of the party, while Jean-François Hory, a French MEP of the Radical Party of the Left within the TRP-sponsored European Radical Alliance group, was president. In 1996, Dupuis took Pannella's seat in the European Parliament.

Within the UN, the party has been involved in a variety of issues: the moratorium on the death penalty and the proposal of a complete abolition, anti-prohibition against global mafias, fair justice, freedom of scientific research and the ban on female genital mutilation. Additionally, the TRP has allowed access to UN meetings to some stateless people, including Tibetans, Uyghurs and Montagnards, and led active monitoring of conflicts, such as the case of Ukraine versus Russia, or gave voice to dissidents opposed to authoritarian regimes like Cuba and Turkey. For its proposal of a peace plan in the Chechen–Russian conflict, the party has collided with Russia and its members risked expulsion from the country.

=== "Italian plague", decline and internal crisis ===
Radicals have often accused the Italian media of ignoring their initiatives and focusing merely on internal conflicts within the Radical world. The inadequate information on Radical initiatives by the Italian media has been meticulously verified by the TRP-sponsored Centro d'Ascolto dell'Informazione Radiotelevisiva and produced several sentences featuring compensations to be paid by RAI, the Italian public broadcaster, and commercial TV as well. Some confusion came from the fact that since the 2000s, rather than highlighting its expansion abroad, the TRP has preferred to focus on the "Case Italy", emblematic of the decadence of a constitutional political system into a "real democracy", that is to say a formal democracy in which its very institutions substantially act in contrast with the constitution.

According to the TRP, Italy has become a "partycratic regime" and, as such, has started to spread the "plague" of "real democracy" around the democratic world. That was denounced by Radicals within international organisations and though the publication of a "yellow book" on the "Italian plague". However, the TRP effectively suffered internal problems too. In 2003 Dupuis resigned from secretary because of serious political differences with Pannella. In 2011–14 Demba Traoré, a politician from Mali, served briefly as secretary: he left the party without officially resigning, after being returned to the government of his own country. The TRP was later provisionally run by a committee, known as the "senate", led by Pannella and composed of the party's leading members.

=== Re-organisation and break-up with Italian Radicals ===
After the death of Pannella in May 2016, an extraordinary congress was convened in September to overcome the long inactivity due to the absence of the secretary, as well as the economic problems undermining the party's viability. The congress adopted with 178 votes in favour, 79 against and 13 abstentions on the final resolution:

- set three main goals (1. affirmation of the rule of law and the human right of knowledge; 2. justice reform in Italy, including pardon, amnesty, abolition of the article 41-bis prison regime and of life sentences; 3. formation of the United States of Europe, inspired on the Ventotene Manifesto);
- set a membership target of 3,000 members for 2017 and 2018 in order to pay for the party's debts, otherwise the TRP would be dissolved;
- suspended the party's organs (secretary, president, treasurer, senate, etc.), with the exception of the congress;
- elected a collective leadership led by Rita Bernardini, Antonella Casu, Sergio D'Elia and Maurizio Turco (legal representative).

The minority faction, led by Bonino and Marco Cappato, in turn, controlled the RI, as confirmed in their November 2016 congress. In February 2017 the TRP severed its ties with the RI (accused of boycotting the TRP, using its assets without paying for them and pursuing an Italian-only electoral agenda), and the latter could no longer use the Radical headquarters. However, the RI's congress invited its members to adhere to the TRP. The 3,000-member target for 2017 was achieved by the TRP in December, while the RI had launched a pro-Europeanist electoral list named More Europe for the 2018 Italian general election.

With the 2019 congress, the TRP, having met the membership targe of 3,000 both in 2017 and 2018, returned to regular business. The new elected leadership included Turco as secretary, Diego Sabatinelli as president of the newly-formed general council and Irene Testa as treasurer, as well as three honorary presidents (Ettore Cannavera, Michael Giffoni and Gaia Tortora). In 2024, the TRP announced an electoral pact with Forza Italia for the 2024 European Parliament election.

== Leadership ==
1989–2016

- Secretary: Sergio Stanzani (1989–1993), Emma Bonino (1993–1995), Olivier Dupuis (1995–2003), Demba Traoré (2011–2014)
- President: Emma Bonino (1989–1993), Marco Pannella (1993–1995), Jean-François Hory (1995–2002), Sergio Stanzani (2002–2011)
  - President of the Federal Council / Senate: Marco Pannella (1989–1993), Olivier Dupuis (1993–1995), Marco Pannella (2005–2016)
  - Honorary President: Bruno Zevi (1989–1999), Sergio Stanzani (2011–2013)
- Treasurer: Paolo Vigevano (1989–1993), Ottavio Lavaggi (1993–1995), Danilo Quinto (1995–2005), Maurizio Turco (2005–2016)

2016–2019

The 2016 congress elected a collective Presidency, composed of the following members: Matteo Angioli, Angiolo Bandinelli, Marco Beltrandi, Rita Bernardini (coordinator), Maurizio Bolognetti, Antonella Casu (coordinator), Antonio Cerrone, Deborah Cianfanelli, Maria Antonietta Coscioni, Sergio D'Elia (coordinator), Mariano Giustino, Giuseppe Rippa, Giuseppe Rossodivita, Irene Testa, Maurizio Turco (coordinator and legal representative), Valter Vecellio, and Elisabetta Zamparutti.

2019–present

- Secretary: Maurizio Turco (2019–present)
  - President of the General Council: Diego Sabatinelli (2019–present)
  - Honorary President: Ettore Cannavera / Michael Giffoni / Gaia Tortora (2019–present)
- Treasurer: Irene Testa (2019–present)

== Members ==
Current prominent members (as of December 2017):

- Emma Bonino, former Italian Member of the European Parliament, European Commissioner and Italian Minister;
- Marco Cappato, former Italian Member of the European Parliament;
- Maurizio Turco, former Italian Member of the European Parliament;
- Andrè Gattolin, Senator, France;
- Dolkun Isa, President of World Uyghur Congress, China/Germany;
- Jianli Jang President of Initiative for China, China;
- Pandeli Majko, former Prime Minister, Albania;
- Sam Rainsy, President of the Cambodia National Rescue Party, Cambodia;
- Tioulong Samura, Member of Parliament, Cambodia;
- Mu Sochua, Vice President of the Cambodia National Rescue Party, Cambodia;
- Struan Stevenson, former UK Member of the European Parliament;
- Najima Thay Thay Rhozali, former Secretary of State for Literacy and non-formal Education, Morocco;
- Thubten Wangchen, monk, Member of the Tibetan Parliament in Exile;
- Rama Yade, former Secretary of State, France;

Former prominent members:

- Marco Pannella, former Italian Member of the European Parliament;
- Gianfranco Dell'Alba, former Italian Member of the European Parliament;
- Benedetto Della Vedova, Italian Undersecretary and former Italian Member of the European Parliament;
- Olivier Dupuis, former Italian Member of the European Parliament;
- David Borden, Executive Director of DRCNet;
- Enver Can, President of the Eastern Turkistan National Congress;
- Chris Davies, former British Member of the European Parliament;
- Wei Jingsheng, President of the Chinese Overseas Coalition for Democracy;
- Oumar Khambiev, former Chechen Minister;
- Kok Ksor, President of the Montagnard Foundation, Inc.;
- Quan Nguyen, President of the International Committee for the Nonviolent in Vietnam;
- Arbën Xhaferi, Chairman of the Democratic Party of Albanians in North Macedonia;
- Vanida Tephsouvan, Executive Director of the Lao Movement of Human Rights;
- Arnold S. Trebach, President International Antiprohibitionist League;
- Vo Van Ai, President of the Vietnam Committee for Human Rights.

== See also ==
- Right to know
- Rule of law
- Nonviolence
- Radicalism (historical)
- Italian Radicals (disambiguation)
- Liberalism and radicalism in Italy
