= Pannella List =

Pannella List Lista Pannella
- Founder: Marco Pannella
- President: Maurizio Turco
- Secretary: Laura Arconti
- Founded: 1992
- Preceded by: Antiprohibitionists on Drugs
- Succeeded by: Bonino List
- Headquarters: Via di Torre Argentina, 76; Rome
- Newspaper: Radio Radicale (FM radio)
- Ideology: Liberalism; Libertarianism
- Political position: Centre
- National affiliation: Forza Italia (1994–96); Pole of Good Government (1994–96); Pole for Freedoms (1996)
- European Parliament group: European Radical Alliance (1994–99)
- Colours: Gold

The Pannella List (Italian: Lista Pannella, LP) is a liberal and libertarian association, which was also the electoral list of the Italian Radicals and the Transnational Radical Party (PRT) between 1992 and 1999, when it was replaced by the Bonino List.

Its standard-bearer was Marco Pannella (who died in 2016), who had been the main leader of the Radical Party (PR) from 1963 to 1989, and later of the PRT and the Italian Radicals party. The List still functions as an association in charge of some of the Radical assets, notably including the party's headquarters and Radio Radicale.

== History ==
In 1989 the PR was transformed into the Transnational Radical Party, an NGO working at the UN-level and coordinating the efforts of several national parties and groupings mainly in support of human rights. Individual Radicals, who always had the right to "double membership" (i.e. being members of another party), joined different parties, while remaining committed members of the PR/PRT. In that year's European Parliament election, Pannella ran in the Liberal–Republican joint list, Marco Taradash launched the "Anti-prohibition List on Drugs", several joined the Rainbow Greens (Francesco Rutelli, Adelaide Aglietta, etc.), and Giovanni Negri was a candidate for the Italian Democratic Socialist Party.

In the run-up of the 1992 general election the Rainbow Greens joined forces with the Federation of Green Lists to form a full-fledged party named Federation of the Greens, and other Radicals (Marcello Pera, Massimo Teodori, etc.) launched the "Yes Referendum" list, while the bulk of the former PR joined Pannella and organised themselves in the Pannella Clubs' Movement (which would field lists for Italian elections from 1992 to 1999). In the election the LP won 1.2% of the vote, while Yes Referendum stopped at 0.8% and the newly formed Federation of the Greens 2.8%.

The PR had historically been considered a left-libertarian party and often proposed itself as the most extreme opposition to the Italian political establishment, thus, when Silvio Berlusconi entered the political arena in 1994, Pannella decided to form an alliance with him to start an (economically) "liberal revolution", as opposed to the conservative and statist political establishment. The LP's alliance with Berlusconi's Forza Italia (FI) was, however, controversial and temporary.

In the 1994 general election the LP won 3.5% of the vote (despite not being present in some key regions), below the required threshold, but still had six deputies elected from FI lists, plus two senators. The Radicals were not involved in Berlusconi's first government (1994–1999), but the elected Radical deputies and senators sat with FI and Emma Bonino, the Radicals' number two, was appointed to the European Commission. The twisted relationship between Pannella and Berlusconi, whose allies included socially conservative parties opposed to the Radicals (notably including National Alliance), soon ended. Following the 1994 European Parliament election, the two Radical MEPs formed the European Radical Alliance group with MEPs from the French Radical Energy and some of the European Free Alliance's regionalist member parties.

For the 1996 general election Pannella teamed up with Vittorio Sgarbi. In the election, during which most of the protest and libertarian votes were attracted by Lega Nord, the Pannella–Sgarbi List won a mere 1.9%, resulting in the election of only a senator, Pietro Milio.

In the run-up of the 1999 European Parliament election, the LP was replaced by the Bonino List. The new list was named after Bonino because of the popularity that the European Commissioner had acquired during her term (1995–1999) and the subsequent "Emma for President" campaign. In 2001 the LP was replaced by the newly formed Italian Radicals as the main Radical political outfit in Italy. After that, the List continued to be active only as an association sponsoring Radical campaigns (including Bonino List's electoral campaigns) and managing Radical assets, notably including the PR/PRT's headquarters and Radio Radicale, the party's FM radio.

After Pannella's death in May 2016, Maurizio Turco and Laura Arconti were elected president and secretary of the association, respectively.

== Electoral results ==
=== Italian Parliament ===
Chamber of Deputies
Election year	# of overall votes	% of overall vote	# of overall seats won	+/–	Leader
1992	485,694 (#12)	1.24	7 / 630	New	Marco Pannella
1994	1,359,283 (#8)	3.51	0 / 630	▼6	Marco Pannella
1996	702,988 (#10)	1.88	0 / 630	Steady	Marco Pannella

Senate of the Republic
Election year	# of overall votes	% of overall vote	# of overall seats won	+/–	Leader
1992	166,708 (#16)	0.50	0 / 315	New	Marco Pannella
1994	767,765 (#6)	2.32	1 / 315	▲1	Marco Pannella
1996	509,826 (#6)	1.56	1 / 315	Steady	Marco Pannella

=== European Parliament ===
Election year	# of overall votes	% of overall vote	# of overall seats won	+/–	Leader
1994	702,717 (#9)	2.13	2 / 87	New	Marco Pannella

== Leadership ==
- President: Marco Pannella (1992–2016), Maurizio Turco (2016–present)
- Secretary: Maurizio Turco (1992–1995), Danilo Quinto (1995–2005), Maurizio Turco (2005–2016), Laura Arconti (2016–present)
