= Olivier Dupuis =

Belgian-Italian politician (1958–2026)

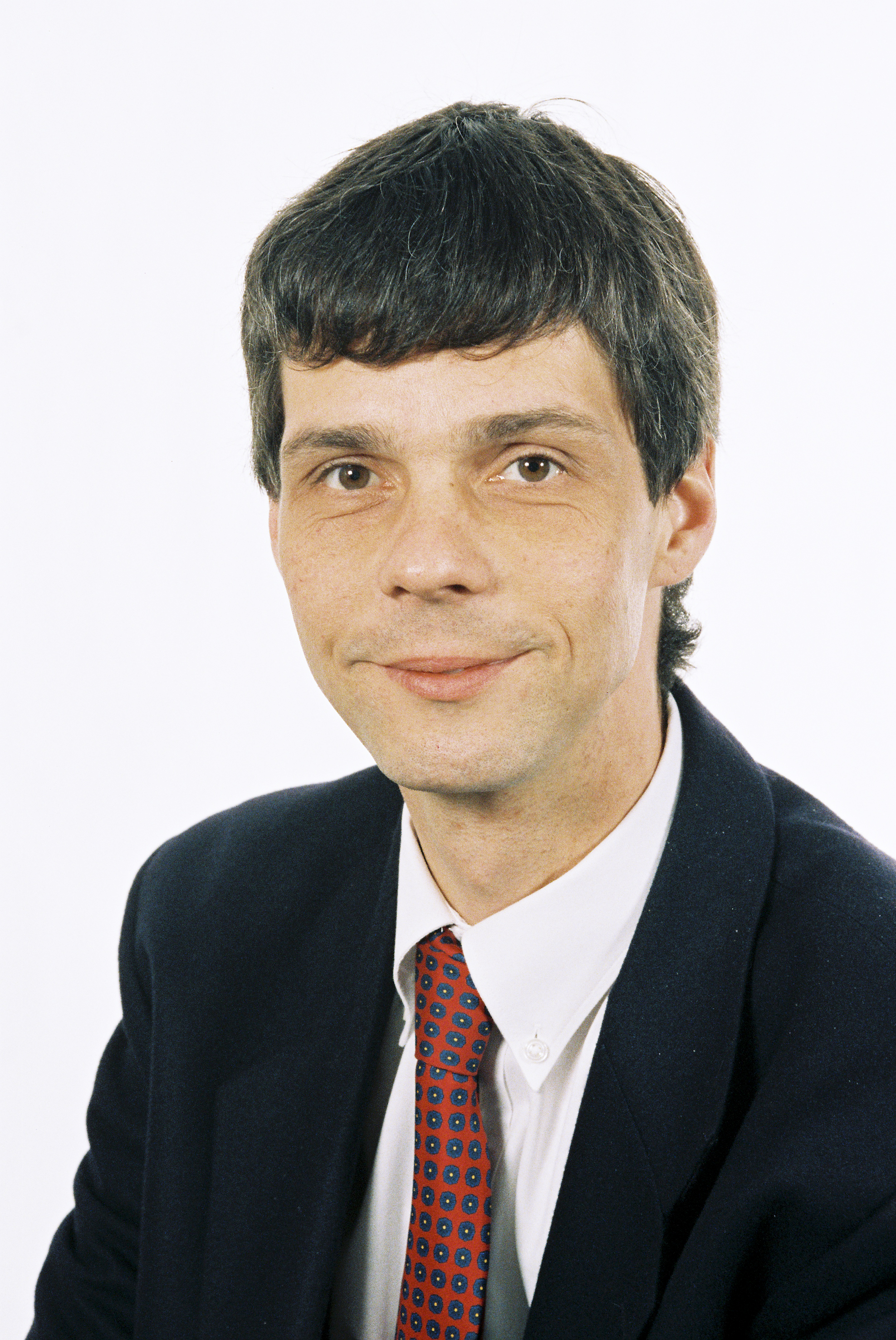
- Dupuis in 1999

Member of the European Parliament for Italy
- In office 30 March 1996 – 19 July 2004

Personal details
- Born: 25 February 1958 Ath, Belgium
- Died: 4 May 2026 (aged 68) Saint-Gilles, Belgium
- Party: LP; Bonino List
- Education: UCLouvain

Olivier Dupuis (25 February 1958 – 4 May 2026) was a Belgian-Italian politician. A member of the Pannella List and the Bonino List, he served in the European Parliament from 1996 to 2004.

Dupuis died in Saint-Gilles on 4 May 2026, at the age of 68.
