= Radical Federative Movement =

The Radical Federative Movement (Movimento Federativo Radicale, MFR) was a social-liberal political party in Italy.

The MFR was formed in November 1982 as a split from Marco Pannella's Radical Party (PR). The leader of the split was Giuseppe Rippa, a former national secretary of the Radicals, other participants were Franco De Cataldo, Silvio Pergameno, Gaetano Quagliariello and Valter Vecellio. The main reason of the split was that the dissenters wanted a stable alliance between the PR and the Italian Socialist Party (PSI), led by Bettino Craxi at the time.

A few years later, in 1985, the MFR was merged into the PSI and Rippa entered the party's national assembly. Later on, both Rippa and Vecellio returned into the Radicals' fold, while Quagliariello followed many fellow Socialists into Forza Italia and, later, The People of Freedom.
