= 1974 Italian divorce referendum =

Referendum on the Abrogation of the Divorce Law
- 12 May 1974
- Do you want the Law of 1 December 1970, No. 898, on the regulation of cases of dissolution of marriage, to be abrogated?
- Outcome: Divorce law remains in force

Results
| Choice | Votes | % |
|---|---|---|
| Yes | 13,157,558 | 40.74% |
| No | 19,138,300 | 59.26% |
| Valid votes | 32,295,858 | 97.80% |
| Invalid or blank votes | 727,321 | 2.20% |
| Total votes | 33,023,179 | 100.00% |
| Registered voters/turnout | 37,646,322 | 87.72% |
- Blue indicates provinces with a majority Yes vote, while Red indicates provinces with a majority No vote.

An abrogative referendum on the divorce law was held in Italy on 12 May 1974. Voters were asked whether they wanted to repeal a government law passed three years earlier allowing divorce for the first time in modern Italian history (Law of 1 December 1970, no. 898). Those voting "yes" wanted to outlaw divorce as had been the case before the law came into effect, and those voting "no" wanted to retain the law and their newly gained right to divorce. The referendum was defeated by a margin of 59.26% to 40.74% on a voter turnout of 87.72% out of 37 million eligible voters, thus allowing the divorce law to remain in force.

This vote was the first of its kind in the country, being the first regular legislative referendum held by the Italian Republic 27 years after the Italian constitution, which allowed such referendums, was approved. It was considered a major victory by the Italian Radical Party for the civil rights and anti-clericalism movements, and for the Italian Radical Party.

== Initial petitions ==
In January 1971 Agostino Sanfratello from Piacenza and Franco Maestrelli from Milan were the first to request a referendum against the divorce law at the Court of Cassation on behalf of the movement Catholic Alliance. Signatures and petitions for the 1974 referendum were collected by Christian groups led by Gabrio Lombardi, with very strong support from the Catholic church.

== Political party positions ==
The Christian Democrats and the neo-fascist Italian Social Movement intensely campaigned for a yes vote to abolish the law and make divorce illegal again. Their main themes were the safeguarding of the traditional nuclear family model and the Roman Catechism.

Most left-wing political forces, the main ones being the Italian Socialist Party and the Italian Communist Party, supported the no faction.

Intense campaigning for a no vote also came from Marco Pannella of the Italian Radical Party which had been petitioning for a right to divorce in Italy since the early 1960s.

| Choice | Parties | Political orientation | Leader |
|---|---|---|---|
| Yes | Christian Democracy (DC) | Christian democracy | Amintore Fanfani |
| Yes | Italian Social Movement (MSI) | Neo-fascism | Giorgio Almirante |
| No | Italian Communist Party (PCI) | Communism | Enrico Berlinguer |
| No | Italian Socialist Party (PSI) | Socialism | Francesco De Martino |
| No | Radical Party (PR) | Libertarianism | Marco Pannella |
| No | Italian Republican Party (PRI) | Social liberalism | Ugo La Malfa |
| No | Italian Liberal Party (PLI) | Liberalism | Agostino Bignardi |
| No | Italian Democratic Socialist Party (PSDI) | Social democracy | Flavio Orlandi |

== Confusion about voting ==
The wording of the referendum statement caused significant confusion, with some people not understanding that they had to vote "No" in order to retain the right to divorce or vote "Yes" in order to outlaw divorce. It was argued that the wording made the statement insufficiently clear, and some campaigners from the no camp stated that without this confusion the no vote might have been even higher than the 59% obtained. (See double negative.)

== Censorship ==
The Eurovision Song Contest 1974 held in April of that year was not broadcast on the Italian state television channel RAI because of Italy's entry, a song by Gigliola Cinquetti. Despite the contest taking place more than a month before the planned vote, and despite Cinquetti eventually coming in second place, Italian censors refused the contest and song to be shown or heard. RAI censors felt the song, titled "Sì" (Italian for "yes") and containing lyrics constantly repeating the word "Sì", could be accused of being a subliminal message and a form of propaganda to influence the Italian voting public to vote yes in the referendum. The song remained censored on most Italian state television and radio stations for over a month.

== Results ==
| Choice | Votes | % |
|---|---|---|
| For | 13,157,558 | 40.74 |
| Against | 19,138,300 | 59.26 |
| Total | 32,295,858 | 100.00 |
| Valid votes | 32,295,858 | 97.80 |
| Invalid/blank votes | 727,321 | 2.20 |
| Total votes | 33,023,179 | 100.00 |
| Registered voters/turnout | 37,646,322 | 87.72 |
Source: Ministry of the Interior

=== By region ===
| Region | Provinces | Yes | | No | | Voters | Turnout |
| Region | Provinces | Votes | % | Votes | % | Voters | Turnout |
|---|---|---|---|---|---|---|---|
| Abruzzo | Chieti • L'Aquila • Pescara • Teramo | 332,899 | 48.87 | 348,229 | 51.13 | 698,591 | 82.16 |
| Aosta Valley | – | 16,753 | 24.94 | 50,412 | 75.06 | 69,731 | 86.81 |
| Apulia | Bari • Brindisi • Foggia • Lecce • Taranto | 996,017 | 52.60 | 897,630 | 47.40 | 1,930,165 | 84.66 |
| Basilicata | Matera • Potenza | 159,339 | 53.58 | 138,024 | 46.42 | 306,461 | 78.87 |
| Calabria | Catanzaro • Cosenza • Reggio Calabria | 460,118 | 50.85 | 444,732 | 49.15 | 929,809 | 74.14 |
| Campania | Avellino • Benevento • Caserta • Naples • Salerno | 1,300,382 | 52.23 | 1,189,374 | 47.77 | 2,536,839 | 79.27 |
| Emilia-Romagna | Bologna • Ferrara • Forlì • Modena • Parma • Piacenza • Ravenna • Reggio Emilia | 771,689 | 29.03 | 1,886,376 | 70.97 | 2,718,077 | 95.28 |
| Friuli-Venezia Giulia | Gorizia • Pordenone • Trieste • Udine | 292,762 | 36.16 | 516,798 | 63.84 | 827,951 | 89.94 |
| Lazio | Frosinone • Latina • Rieti • Rome • Viterbo | 1,042,313 | 36.62 | 1,804,009 | 63.38 | 2,892,505 | 89.58 |
| Liguria | Genoa • Imperia • La Spezia • Savona | 335,075 | 27.43 | 886,343 | 72.57 | 1,249,008 | 89.42 |
| Lombardy | Bergamo • Brescia • Cremona • Como • Mantua • Milan • Pavia • Sondrio • Varese | 2,172,595 | 40.09 | 3,246,669 | 59.91 | 5,545,794 | 93.15 |
| Marche | Ascoli Piceno • Ancona • Macerata • Pesaro | 370,794 | 42.38 | 504,226 | 57.62 | 903,809 | 92.28 |
| Molise | Campobasso • Isernia | 104,221 | 60.04 | 69,372 | 39.96 | 178,484 | 75.87 |
| Piedmont | Alessandria • Asti • Cuneo • Novara • Turin • Vercelli | 838,143 | 29.17 | 2,035,546 | 70.83 | 2,954,956 | 90.79 |
| Sardinia | Cagliari • Nuoro • Sassari | 338,344 | 44.80 | 416,965 | 55.20 | 768,792 | 81.93 |
| Sicily | Agrigento • Caltanissetta • Catania • Enna • Palermo • Ragusa • Syracuse • Trapani | 1,163,074 | 49.42 | 1,190,268 | 50.58 | 2,404,640 | 76.59 |
| Trentino-Alto Adige | Bolzano • Trento | 247,917 | 50.60 | 242,051 | 49.40 | 505,578 | 89.82 |
| Tuscany | Arezzo • Florence • Grosseto • Livorno • Lucca • Massa-Carrara • Pisa • Pistoia • Siena | 722,105 | 30.40 | 1,653,198 | 69.60 | 2,425,088 | 93.95 |
| Umbria | Perugia • Terni | 170,054 | 32.63 | 351,077 | 67.37 | 532,525 | 92.79 |
| Veneto | Belluno • Padua • Rovigo • Treviso • Venice • Verona • Vicenza | 1,322,964 | 51.08 | 1,267,001 | 48.92 | 2,650,676 | 93.60 |
| Italy | | 13,157,558 | 40.74 | 19,138,300 | 59.26 | 33,023,179 | 87.72 |
Source: Ministry of the Interior

=== By most populated city ===
| City | Yes | | No | | Voters | Turnout |
| City | Votes | % | Votes | % | Voters | Turnout |
|---|---|---|---|---|---|---|
| Turin | 154,908 | 20.14 | 614,066 | 79.86 | 780,799 | 90.71 |
| Milan | 293,045 | 26.50 | 812,955 | 73.50 | 1,121,926 | 91.03 |
| Genoa | 128,669 | 24.30 | 400,707 | 75.70 | 538,632 | 88.58 |
| Venice | 68,647 | 29.23 | 166,222 | 70.77 | 238,697 | 94.03 |
| Bologna | 94,695 | 26.74 | 259,389 | 73.26 | 359,705 | 96.27 |
| Florence | 91,359 | 28.73 | 226,672 | 71.27 | 323,258 | 94.25 |
| Rome | 539,601 | 31.99 | 1,147,279 | 68.01 | 1,705,079 | 89.38 |
| Naples | 238,464 | 39.70 | 362,218 | 60.30 | 606,157 | 79.72 |
| Palermo | 135,149 | 43.71 | 174,024 | 56.29 | 313,228 | 76.51 |

== See also ==
- Referendums in Italy
