= Abortion in Italy =

Abortion in Italy became legal in May 1978, when Italian women were allowed to terminate a pregnancy on request during the first 12 weeks and 6 days (90 days). A proposal to repeal the law was considered in a 1981 referendum, but was rejected by nearly 68% of voters; another referendum aimed at eliminating the restrictions was rejected by 88.4%.

Italian women are eligible to request an abortion for health, economic or social reasons, including the circumstances under which conception occurred. Abortions are performed free of charge in public hospitals or in private structures authorized by the regional health authorities. The law also allows termination in the second trimester of the pregnancy only when the life of the woman would be at risk if the pregnancy is carried to term or the fetus carries genetic or other serious malformations which would put the mother at risk of serious psychological or physical consequences.

The law states that, unless a state of emergency requires immediate intervention, a period of seven days, not compulsory, has to occur between the medical authorization and the effective date of the termination. Although the law only permits pregnancy termination to women at least eighteen years old, it also includes provisions for women younger than eighteen, who can request the intervention of a judge when the legal tutor refuses the intervention, or there are reasons to exclude the legal tutor from the process. The judge has to make a decision within five days of the request. Women younger than eighteen do not need parental consent in case of urgent situation or after 90 days.

== Legal induced abortions ==
Since 1980, the Laboratory of Epidemiology and Biostatistics at the High Institute of Health (Istituto Superiore di Sanità, ISS) in Rome has maintained a surveillance system for legal induced abortions. This system is based on quarterly reporting by the regional health authorities. A standardized form is compiled that contains aggregate data on major social-demographic characteristics of the woman (age, residency status, marital status, reproductive history) as well as details about the procedure (weeks of gestation, whether the procedure is elective or performed on an emergency basis, where certification was issued, type of procedure and location where it was performed, duration of stay, and immediate complications). This information is then sent to the ISS, which examines data quality and performs data analysis of trends, geographic distribution, and characteristics of women undergoing abortion. These analyses are performed annually by the ISS and the Ministry of Health (MH) and presented by the Minister of Health to the Parliament; results are also published in ISTISAN reports, an official publication of the ISS. Italy is considered to have one of the most accurate and timely abortion surveillance systems in the world.

== Anonymous childbirth option ==
In 2000, the decree of the President of Italy n. 396/2000 introduced the right for women to opt for anonymous childbirth. The newborn is not legally recognized by their natural parents and does not assume the father/mother's surname. The mother has by law the right to remain permanently anonymous and the custody of the newborn is temporarily given to the hospital, waiting until a third party adoption takes place.

== Abortion rate ==
VTP movements in Italy during 2021

In 2018, the abortion rate (the number of abortions per 1,000 women of childbearing age) in Italy was 6 per 1,000 women between 15 and 49 years old. The abortion ratio in 2018 was 173.8 per 1,000 live births. It has been reported that 67% of unwanted pregnancies in Italy successfully managed to result in abortion. At the peak in 1983, the ratio was of 389.8 per 1,000 live births and has been steadily decreasing since then.

Abortion ratio (number of abortions per 1,000 live births) in Italy by geographical area, 1983-2018
Region	1983	1991	2014	2015	2016	2017	2018
Northern Italy	484.2	327.1	194.6	182.7	184.2	180.8	179.2
Central Italy	515.2	356.1	214.0	211.4	199.9	194.6	192.0
Southern Italy	283.8	253.0	202.6	182.9	177.6	169.1	163.4
Italian Islands	205.3	176.1	159.3	156.3	155.4	149.6	143.1
Italy	381.7	286.9	196.2	185.1	182.4	177.1	173.8

The central and northern regions (in particular Emilia-Romagna, Liguria and Tuscany) are characterized by relatively low TFRs (one lifetime birth per woman), high abortion rates and elevated abortion ratios. While low levels of fertility can also be found in some of the northwestern regions, abortion rates are moderate in these regions (9–12 abortions per 1,000); therefore, abortion ratios in a few of these areas are closer to the national level.

Subsequent to the legalization of abortion in Italy in 1978, abortion rates among Italian women first rose and then declined steadily, from a peak of 16.9 abortions per 1,000 women of reproductive age in 1983 to 9.8 per 1,000 in 1993. Abortion rates vary considerably by geographic region, with rates typically highest in the more secular regions and lowest in regions where traditional values predominate. Data from 1981 and 1991 indicate that age-specific abortion rates decreased during the 1980s for all age-groups, with the largest declines occurring in regions with the highest levels of abortion. Moreover, a shift in the age distribution of abortion rates occurred during the 1980s, with women aged 30–34 registering the highest abortion rate in 1991, whereas in 1981 the highest level of abortion occurred among those aged 25–29. The abortion rate among adolescent women was low at both times (7.6 per 1,000 in 1981 and 4.6 per 1,000 in 1991). These data are based only on reported legal abortions; the number of clandestine abortions remains unknown.

A phenomenon to emerge in recent years has been an increase in the number of abortions requested by immigrant women. Among the 138,357 abortions performed in 1993, 13,826 (10%) involved foreign residents, an increase from 9,850 in 1996. This increase is most likely due to the rising number of immigrant women in Italy; the resident permits, for example, according to the data of the National Statistics Institute (ISTAT), have increased from 678,000 in 1995 to 1,100,000 in 1999. Based on estimates of the population of immigrant women 18–49 years of age, Istat has calculated that the AR for immigrant women was 28.7/1000 in 1998, approximately three times higher than that observed in Italian citizens. Indeed, the increase in the numbers of immigrant women may be the main cause of the leveling-off of the abortion rate in Italy. If the analysis of trends is limited to 1996–1998, years for which information is most complete on residency status, the number of abortions in Italian women declined from 127,700 in 1996 to 123,728 in 1998.

== Abortion incidence ==
In 1993, approximately 140,000 induced abortions were performed in Italy. In comparison, the average annual number during the period 1982–1984 was more than 230,000. Similar patterns can also be seen in abortion rates. After legalization, abortion rates rose modestly, increasing from 13.7 abortions per 1,000 women aged 15–44 in 1979 to a peak of 16.9 per 1,000 in 1982 and 1983. During the period 1982–1984, Italian abortion rates stabilized, and this period was followed by a steady decline: By 1986, the rate had dropped to 14.0 abortions per 1,000 women, and by 1990 it had reached 11.1 per 1,000; by 1993, the abortion rate had decreased to 9.8 per 1,000.

As of 2010, the abortion rate was 10.0 abortions per 1000 women aged 15–44 years.

== Legislation ==
Abortion law

Italian Parliament
- Long title: Provisions regarding the social protection of motherhood and the voluntary termination of a pregnancy
- Citation: Law No. 194 of 1978
- Enacted by: Chamber of Deputies
- Enacted by: Senate of the Republic
- Signed by: Giovanni Leone
- Signed: 22 May 1978
- Commenced: 5 June 1978

Legislative history

Initiating chamber: Chamber of Deputies
- Introduced by: Vincenzo Balzamo
- Passed: 13 April 1978
- Voting summary: 308 voted for; 275 voted against

Revising chamber: Senate of the Republic
- Passed: 18 May 1978
- Voting summary: 160 voted for; 148 voted against
- Status: Current legislation

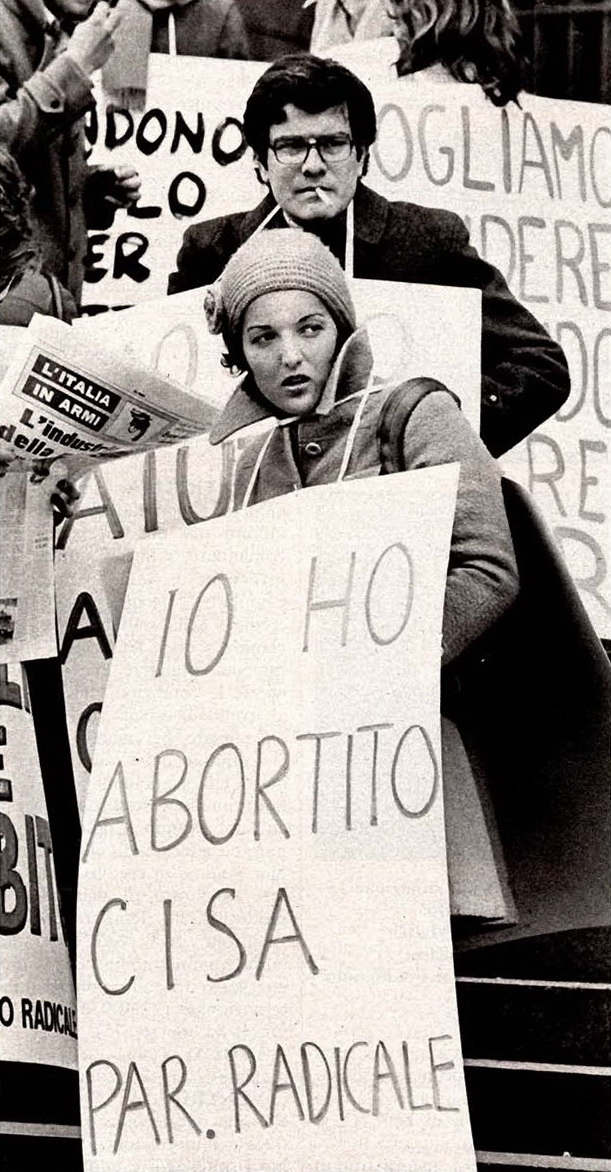
Demonstration for abortion in Milan, 1975

=== Historical background ===
Before the approval of the law, in 1978, abortion was considered to be a crime against the integrity and the bloodline, as stated in the Criminal Code book 2 Title X.

In particular, Article 546 prohibited all types of abortions, with penalties of 2–5 years in prison. The only exception was so-called state of necessity, which entails a current and imminent danger to the woman.

The turning point for the abortion debate was decision number 27 of the Italian Constitutional Court on 18 February 1975 that stated that Article 546 is unconstitutional. Indeed, the Court ruled that Article 546 was contradicted by Article 31 of the Italian Constitution, which "protects maternity, infancy and youth, promoting the institutions necessary thereto". Moreover, Article 546 was found to be precluded by Article 32 of the Constitution, which specified that the Republic safeguards health as a fundamental right of the individual.

The Italian magazine Panorama, in 1974, found out that a significant number of illegal abortions were performed every year, and it suggested that all women had either had an abortion or knew a friend who had one.

=== Parliamentary debate ===
In the early seventies, two bills originating from the radical left aimed to legalize therapeutic abortion. These bills did not reach the discussion state before the dissolution of parliament and the calling of new elections. In 1973 the fight to legalize abortion was begun with the Fortuna first bill. Fortuna's law provided for the possibility of therapeutic abortions but required the agreement of three doctors and precluded abortion unless the woman was seriously ill or insane. It also demanded the consent of parents for girls under 18. After the election in 1976, the pro-abortion majority was committed to legalization and nine different bills were presented from June 1976 till April 1978. Finally, a bill was passed and published on 22 May 1978.

==== The influence of feminism ====
From the end of the 1960s, feminism played a leading role in reorganizing the terms of the debate about women and their condition. Abortion has united feminist groups which have fought to demand abortion rights. The peak was reached between 1974 and 1976 with the mass mobilization. This coincides with the political struggle for abortion, but, by the time the abortion law was passed in 1978, the major moment of activity had passed.

==== Catholic church ====
The power and strength of the Vatican and the organized church is exerted in economic and political terms, but it is also exercised at a more local level through its strength in the provision of social services and neighborhood organization. The Church's stance on sexuality and the family is a highly significant public statement to the faithful. It is a central doctrinal area and one through which the church is intent on reinforcing and extending its influence. For the church, since abortion involves the destruction of human life, it can never be accepted regardless of the difficulties this position imposes. This means that the church cannot admit the possibility of legal abortions. The Christian Democratic Party had governed Italy since 1948, together with the Italian Communist Party's interpretation of the importance of Catholicism for any analysis of the balance of forces. The council of Italian bishops issued a statement confirming the church's position on abortion and arguing against its legalization.

=== The content of Law n. 194 ===
The law 194 on the adoption of social protection of motherhood and the voluntary termination of pregnancy.

Art. 1 stated that the State guarantees the right to responsible and planned parenthood, recognizes the social value of motherhood, and shall protect human life from the beginning.

Moreover, the voluntary termination of pregnancy as covered by this law shall not be a means of birth control.

Art. 2 regards the function of family counseling center (consultori familiari) and what it is their role in relation to the law. Family counselling centers shall assist any pregnant woman:

- By informing her of her rights under State legislation and of the social, health and welfare services actually available from agencies.
- By informing her of appropriate ways to take advantage of the provisions of labor legislation design to protect any pregnant women
- By suggesting to the local agencies solution to problem relate to motherhood
- By helping to overcome the factors which might lead the woman to have her pregnancy terminated.

The law presents two different scenarios:

1) Pregnancy during the first 90 days (Art. 4)

In order to practice the termination of pregnancy during the first 90 days, women whose situation is such that continuation of the pregnancy, childbirth, or motherhood would seriously compromise their physical or mental health, in view of their state of health, their economic, social, or family circumstances, the circumstances in which conception occurred, or the chance that the child would be born with abnormalities or malformations, shall apply to a public counselling center or to a fully authorized medical-social agency in the region, or to a physician of her choice.

Art. 5 extends the explanation of family counselling centre when economic, social or family circumstances motivate the reasons to interrupt the pregnancy.

2) Pregnancy after the first 90 days (Art.6)

Voluntary termination of pregnancy may be performed after the first 90 days when the pregnancy or childbirth is a serious threat to the woman's life or when the pathological processes constitute a serious threat to the woman's physical or mental health, such as those associated with serious abnormalities or malformations of the fetus, have been diagnosed.

Furthermore, there is the need for guardian's approval if a girl that is under 18 years old or the woman that is interdicted in order to carry out abortion (Art. 12 and Art. 14). Articles 18 and 19 cover the consequences for any person inducing a termination without the consent of the woman.

=== Conscientious objection ===
Geographical distribution of conscientious objectors in Italy Italy North Centre South Sicily and Sardinia

Abortions per gynecologist in Italy per working week in 2016 (data for Lombardia is of 2016)

The law gives the option for health professionals to claim the right to refuse to perform abortion. If the health personnel demands to be conscientious objector, they have to declare it in advance (Art.9). However, conscientious objection may not be invoked by health professionals if the personal intervention is essential in order to save the life of a woman in imminent danger.

Italy keeps a record of the objecting doctors. According to data from the Ministry of Health, between 1997 and 2016 there was a 12.9% increase in the number of gynecologists who refuse to perform abortions on moral grounds, from 62.8% to 70.9%, the highest percentage ever recorded. As of 2016 the percentage is higher than the national average in Southern Italy (83.5%) and Sicily and Sardinia (77.7%), and lower in Central (70.1%) and Northern Italy (63.9%). The percentage is growing in all the macroregions except the North. As a result, voluntary abortion is performed only in 60% of the hospitals of the country. Also, non-objecting doctors suffer discrimination, and—in some provinces—need to perform record numbers of abortions, up to 15.8 per week in the province of Taranto (Apulia) or 12.2 in the province of Catania (Sicily).

A resolution by the Council of Europe has found several violations of the European Social Charter in the situation:

- right to protection of health (art. 11) of women seeking abortion;
- right to work (art. 1) and to dignity at work (art. 26) of non-objecting medical practitioners, because of different treatment and moral harassment.

=== Access to abortion clinics ===
In April 2024, Italy's parliament approved a legislation proposed by the government of Giorgia Meloni to give anti-abortion groups access to abortion facilities where they can try to convince women seeking abortion. The legislation will be funded by European Union's post-pandemic recovery fund.

Meloni cited Law 194 to introduce the package arguing that women should be fully informed of their decisions. Medical practitioners criticized the legislation saying they will allow unqualified and anti-abortion groups to have access to women seeking the service.

Access to abortion facilities have already been restricted in Italy because of the high number of gynaecologists who morally object to perform the procedure, who in 2021 accounted for 63% of the total.

== See also ==
- Catholic Church and abortion
