= Kok Ksor =

Vietnamese-born activist

Kok Ksor (Jarai: Ksor Kơk, born 1945 in Gia Lai Province, in the Central Highlands of Vietnam, died in USA on 9 January 2019) was a member of the Jarai ethnic group and the President of the Montagnard Foundation, Inc., an organization, begun as an RSO at the University of Chicago, which states that its mission is to preserve the lives, rights and culture of the Montagnard people. He had begun his activities in the FULRO since its founding year.

Kok Ksor was also a member of the Transnational Radical Party (TRP), a non-government agency that investigates human rights abuses in the world.
