= Adele Faccio =

Italian politician (1920–2007)

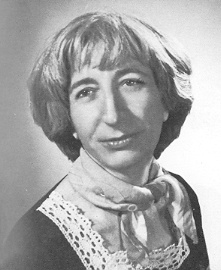

Member of the Chamber of Deputies
- In office 5 July 1976 – 13 December 1978; 20 June 1979 – 11 July 1983; 2 June 1987 – 23 May 1990
- Constituency: Milan

President of the Radical Party
- In office 1975–1976
- Preceded by: Marco Pannella
- Succeeded by: Marco Pannella

Personal details
- Born: 13 November 1920 Pontebba, Udine
- Died: 8 February 2007 (aged 86) Rome
- Party: Radical Party

Adele Faccio (13 November 1920 – 8 February 2007) was an Italian politician and deputy of the Radical Party (Partito Radicale). She was an advocate for sexual and reproductive rights, striving to give women the choice of whether or not to reproduce.

== Abortion activism ==
She founded the Information Centre on Sterilisation and Abortion (Centro d'Informazione sulla Sterilizzazione e sull'Aborto) in 1973.

She wrote articles for "La vie femminile" regarding abortion and exploitation of women.
