= Mauro Mellini =

Italian lawyer and politician (1927–2020)

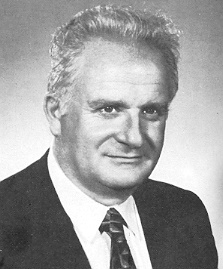
Mauro Mellini

Mauro Mellini (10 February 1927 – 5 July 2020) was an Italian politician and lawyer.

Mellini was born in Civitavecchia on 10 February 1927. He studied law, and was first elected to the Chamber of Deputies in 1976 on the Radical Party ticket. Mellini remained in office until 1992. He died at the Gemelli University Hospital on 5 July 2020, aged 93.
