= Amnesty Justice Freedom List =

Amnesty Justice Freedom List Lista Amnistia Giustizia Libertà
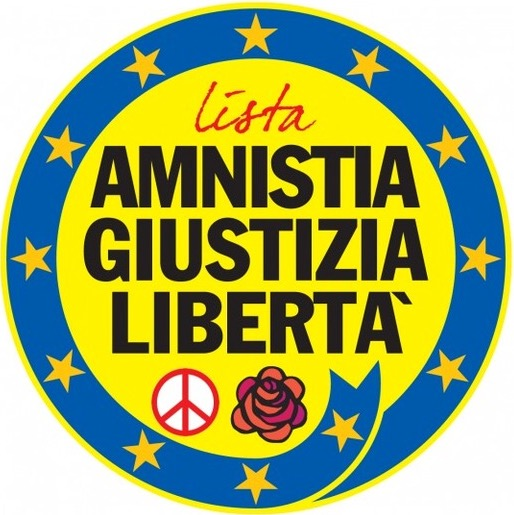
- Leader: Marco Pannella
- Founded: 2012
- Dissolved: 2013
- Preceded by: Bonino-Pannella List
- Ideology: Liberalism; Libertarianism; Pro-Europeanism
- National affiliation: Italian Radicals

The Amnesty Justice Freedom List (Italian: Lista Amnistia Giustizia Libertà, AGL) was a libertarian electoral list active in Italy from 2012. The list was the successor of the Bonino-Pannella List, active from 2009 to 2012.

== History ==
In the 2013 general elections, the Radicals, unlike in previous elections, did not appear on Democratic Party's electoral lists and presented themselves independently from the centre-left coalition with the Amnesty Justice Freedom List, denouncing the poor state of prisons and Italian justice and proposing an amnesty as a solution. However, the list only received 0.2% of the vote for the House and 0.2% in the Senate, far from the threshold for non-coalition parties and therefore remaining outside parliament. At the contemporary regional elections the Amnesty Justice Freedom List presented candidates only in Lazio by nominating the outgoing regional councillor Giuseppe Rossodivita to the presidency. The list stops at 0.4% while the candidate gets 0.4%.

== Electoral results ==
=== Italian Parliament ===
Chamber of Deputies
Election year	# of overall votes	% of overall vote	# of overall seats won	+/–	Leader
2013	64,732 (#19)	0.2	0 / 630	–	Marco Pannella

Senate of the Republic
Election year	# of overall votes	% of overall vote	# of overall seats won	+/–	Leader
2013	63,149 (#18)	0.2	0 / 315	–	Marco Pannella
