= Roberto Cicciomessere =

Italian politician (1946–2023)

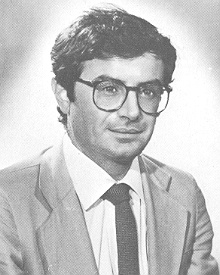
Roberto Cicciomessere

Roberto Cicciomessere (30 October 1946 – 26 May 2023) was an Italian politician who served as a Member of the European Parliament.

He was among the founder of the Italian Radical Party in which he also served as a Secretary (1970–1971). He was a member of the Italian Parliament for five mandates (1979-1984 and 1990-1994).

In 1972 he was incarcerated for refusing the draft as a Conscientious Objector. He was also one of the founders of the Italian Conscientious Objectors League and one of the founders of the Internet provider Agorà Telematica.
