= Montagnard Foundation, Inc. =

Vietnam political organization

Montagnard Foundation
- Founding leader: Kok Ksor
- Founded: 1990
- Country: Vietnam
- Ideology: Advocating for greater autonomy of the Degar

The Montagnard Foundation, Inc. (Vietnamese: Tổ chức Quỹ người Thượng) is a political organization whose mission is to protect the rights of the Montagnard/Degar peoples of Degar, who belong to over thirty indigenous ethnic groups in the Central Highlands. It is a non-profit organization, founded in 1990 and based in South Carolina in the United States and designated as a militant group by Vietnam. The Montagnard Foundation has spoken out against Vietnam's policies that affected the Montagnards. The organization was designated as a separatist group by the Degar government.

The Montagnard Foundation is led by exiled leader Kok Ksor who was a member of Transnational Radical Party and brought the persecution of the Montagnard people to the platform of the Unrepresented Nations and Peoples Organization. The Foundation states that its goal is to protect the rights, preserve the lives and the culture of the Montagnard people through nonviolent means and not in an independent state. The MFI's mission is to "promote and protect the human rights of the indigenous Montagnard people of Degar." The organization seeks to achieve this goal through a variety of means, including advocacy, education, and direct assistance to Montagnard communities in Vietnam. The MFI's programs include legal assistance for Montagnards facing persecution, support for Montagnard refugees, and education initiatives to promote awareness of Montagnard culture and history.

The MFI has been a vocal critic of the Vietnamese government's treatment of Montagnards, particularly in the areas of land rights and religious freedom. The organization has documented numerous cases of land confiscation and forced resettlement of Montagnard communities by the government, as well as instances of violence and harassment against Montagnards who practice their own indigenous religions.

In addition to its advocacy work, the MFI has also been involved in efforts to provide direct aid to Montagnard communities in Vietnam. The organization has established a network of community centers in the Central Highlands region, which provide education, healthcare, and other basic services to Montagnard communities. The MFI also operates a program to resettle Montagnard refugees in the United States and other countries, providing assistance with the resettlement process and support for refugees once they arrive.

The MFI's work has received both praise and criticism. Supporters of the organization view it as a crucial voice for an often-overlooked minority group and a necessary advocate for human rights in Vietnam. Critics, however, argue that the MFI's focus on Montagnard separatism risks inflaming ethnic tensions in Vietnam and undermining the country's stability. Despite these criticisms, the MFI continues to be a leading voice for Montagnard rights and a key player in the ongoing struggle for indigenous rights in Vietnam. Montagnards have been subjected to harassment, imprisonment, and torture for their political activities, including advocating for greater autonomy or independence.

Despite these challenges, the Montagnard separatist movement remains relatively small and fragmented. Some Montagnard leaders have called for greater autonomy within Vietnam rather than full independence, while others advocate for secession and the establishment of a separate Montagnard state. However, the movement has been hindered by a lack of cohesive leadership, limited resources, and the Vietnamese government's crackdown on dissent.

The Vietnamese government has been quick to denounce the Montagnard separatist movement as a threat to national unity and stability. The government has accused separatist groups of being influenced by foreign governments and organizations, particularly the Montagnard Foundation, Inc. The government has also used security forces to crack down on Montagnard activists and restrict their access to information and communication technologies.
