= Bonino List =

Bonino List Lista Bonino
- Leader: Emma Bonino
- Founded: 1999
- Dissolved: 2004
- Preceded by: Pannella List
- Succeeded by: Bonino-Pannella List
- Ideology: Liberalism; Libertarianism; Pro-Europeanism
- European Parliament group: Technical Group of Independents (1999–2001)

The Bonino List (Italian: Lista Bonino) was a liberal and libertarian electoral list active in Italy from 1999 to 2004. Named after Emma Bonino, a leading Radical who had been European Commissioner in 1995–1999 (appointed by Silvio Berlusconi), after the unsuccessful "Emma for President" campaign, the list was the successor of the Pannella List, active from 1992 to 1999.

== History ==
In the 1999 European Parliament election the Bonino List, thanks to its standard-bearer's popularity and a massive use of commercials, won a surprisingly high 8.5% of the vote and 7 MEPs (Emma Bonino, Marco Pannella, Benedetto Della Vedova, Marco Cappato, Olivier Dupuis, Maurizio Turco and Gianfranco Dell'Alba), thus becoming the fourth largest party in the country by European representation. The MEPs co-founded the short-lived Technical Group of Independents.

The list, which gathered the support of disgruntled voters, women and young people, did particularly well in Northern Italy (13.2% in Piedmont, 13.0% in Friuli-Venezia Giulia, 11.9% in Veneto, 11.6% in Lombardy, 10.8% in Liguria), where its proposed libertarian policies were very popular, especially among disappointed Lega Nord's supporters, while it did fairly worse in the conservative and statist South (below 4% in Basilicata, Calabria and Sicily).

The list failed to join any electoral major political coalition both for the 2000 regional elections (in which Radical regional councillors were elected in Piedmont and Lombardy) and especially for 2001 general election. The Radicals thus returned to their traditional share of vote at around 2%. This is what happened also in the 2004 European Parliament election, when only Bonino and Pannella were re-elected and were founding members of the ALDE Group.

In 2001 the Radicals re-organised themselves as a party for the first time since 1989, when the late Radical Party was transformed into the Transnational Radical Party. The "Bonino List" banner was used for the last time in 2004 and the next year the Radicals decided to join the centre-left The Union coalition, by joining forces with the Italian Democratic Socialists in 2006 general election (through the Rose in the Fist), and directly the newly-formed Democratic Party in 2008.
