= Massimo Teodori =

Italian author and politician

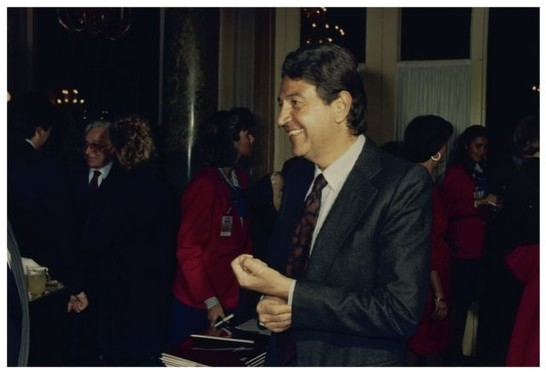
Massimo Teodori

Massimo Teodori (born 9 September 1938) is an Italian author and politician; his books mainly focus on the differences between Europe and the United States.

He was born in Force, near the city of Ascoli Piceno, Marche, to an upper-middle-class family. His grandfather, a landowning farmer, was a liberal deputy in Ascoli Piceno from 1903 to 1919 who shared the ideas of Giovanni Giolitti. His father, a lawyer, was a liberal antifascist who held public responsibilities during the Italian Liberation and in the immediate post First World War period. For three years as a teenager, he hitchhiked throughout Europe. As of 1958 he lives in Rome, where he got a university degree in architecture with Bruno Zevi and Ludovico Quaroni, whom he began to collaborate with. During his university training, he was involved in local and national university politics.

In the mid-1960s he lived in the United States (New York City, Philadelphia, San Francisco, and Berkeley). In 1971, despite lacking a degree in the subject, he began to teach American History at Italian universities. In 1979 he became a professor at the Faculty of Political Sciences at the University of Perugia. In Italy he has taught at the Libera Università Italiana Scienze Sociali (LUISS) of Rome and at the Johns Hopkins University extension at Bologna. In the United States, he has lectured at the University of California, Berkeley, Columbia University, and Harvard University.

Massimo Teodori has written a number of books:

- Maledetti Americani (“Cursed Americans”)
- Benedetti Americani (“Blessed Americans”)
- L’Europa non è l’America (“Europe is not United States”)
- Raccontare l’America (“To tell America”)
