= Adelaide Aglietta =

Italian politician (1940–2000)

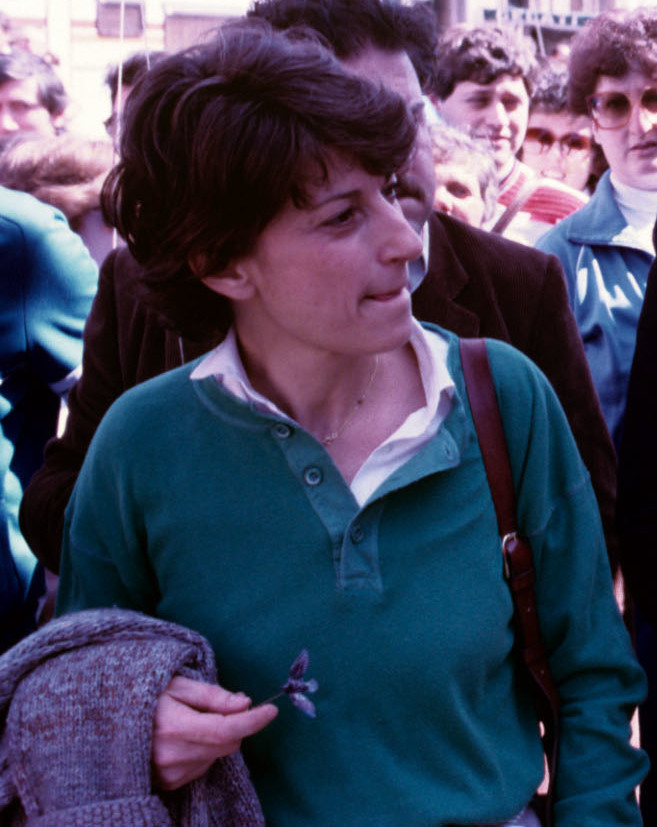
- Aglietta in 1985

Member of the European Parliament
- In office 1989–1999

Member of the Chamber of Deputies
- In office: 1979–1985; 1987–1989

Personal details
- Born: 4 June 1940; Turin, Italy
- Died: 20 May 2000 (aged 59); Rome, Italy
- Political party: Federation of the Greens (from 1990); Rainbow Greens (1989–1990); Radical Party (until 1989)

Maria Adelaide Aglietta (4 June 1940 – 20 May 2000) was an Italian politician, deputy for the Radical Party between 1979 and 1985 (when she resigned) and 1987 to 1989. She was also a Member of the European Parliament from 1989 to 1999. Between 1 November 1990 and 18 July 1994 she was head of the Greens parliamentary group in the European Parliament.

Aglietta was born in Turin. She died on May 20, 2000.
