= Radical Party (Italy) =

Liberal political party in Italy

Radical Party Partito Radicale
- The fist and rose emblem used between 1976 and 1983
- Leader: Marco Pannella
- Founded: 11 December 1955; 70 years ago
- Dissolved: 1 January 1989
- Split from: Italian Liberal Party
- Succeeded by: Antiprohibitionists on Drugs; Transnational Radical Party
- Headquarters: Via di Torre Argentina 76 00186 Rome
- Newspaper: Il Mondo; Notizie Radicali
- Membership (1958): 11,645
- Ideology: Liberalism; Radicalism; Left-libertarianism
- Political position: Centre to centre-left
- European affiliation: Coordination of European Green and Radical Parties/European Green Coordination
- European Parliament group: Technical Group of Independents; Non-Inscrits; Green Group
- Colours: Yellow

The Radical Party (Italian: Partito Radicale, PR) was a liberal and left-libertarian political party in Italy. For decades, inspired by 19th-century radicalism, the Radical Party was a bastion of anti-clericalism, civil libertarianism, feminism, liberalism and radicalism in Italy as well as environmentalism. The party proposed itself as the strongest opposition to the Italian political establishment, seen as corrupt and conservative. Although it never reached high shares of vote and never participated in government, the party had close relations with the other parties of the Italian left—from the Republicans and the Socialists to the Communists and Proletarian Democracy—and opened its ranks also to members of other parties through dual membership.

The party's longtime leader was Marco Pannella (1930–2016), who served as a member of the Chamber of Deputies (1976–1994) and the European Parliament (1979–2009), leading the party in most of the elections it contested. In 1989, the PR was transformed into the Transnational Radical Party, a non-governmental organisation tasked with defending liberal and left-libertarian values. During the 1990s, the Radicals had formed a succession of electoral lists (notably including the Pannella List and Bonino List), without having a structured party and sometimes dividing themselves between competing lists. The latest incarnation of the party is the Italian Radicals, founded in 2001, former section of Transnational Radical Party.

== History ==
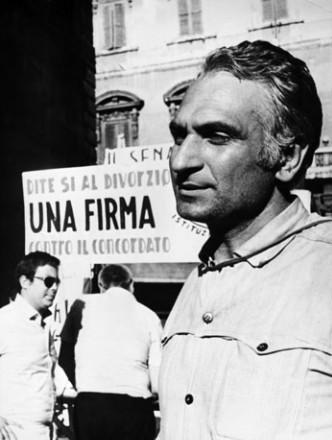
Marco Pannella campaigning for the divorce referendum in 1974

The PR was founded in 1955 by the left wing of the Italian Liberal Party as the ideal continuation of the historical Radical Party, active from 1877 to 1925, emphasising liberal and secular issues such as separation of church and state and the full implementation of the Constitution. Leading members of the new party included Bruno Villabruna, Mario Pannunzio, Ernesto Rossi, Leo Valiani, Guido Calogero, Giovanni Ferrara, Paolo Ungari, Eugenio Scalfari and Marco Pannella.

Following a leadership crisis in 1963, most party members left the PR and joined the Italian Socialist Party or the Italian Republican Party; the remaining members, under the leadership of Pannella and Gianfranco Spadaccia took control of the party, which abandoned its original social-liberal views and adopted a strong left-libertarian position. The "new" PR came to political success in the 1976 general election, when it entered Parliament with four deputies: Pannella, Emma Bonino, Adele Faccio and Mauro Mellini. In the 1979 general election, the party won 3.5% of the vote and elected 18 deputies and two senators, its best result ever and by far the largest gain of any party in the Chamber of Deputies.

The relative success of the party was a consequence of the new line impressed by Pannella who moved the party's focus to issues like divorce and abortion, also by winning three referendums on those issues in 1974 and 1981. In 1979, following the first European Parliament direct election, the PR was involved with Coordination of European Green and Radical Parties (CEGRP) and its unsuccessful efforts to create a single pan-European platform for green and radical politics.

From 1976, the PR used the fist and rose emblem created by the French Socialist Party and later used by the Socialist International, although they were not ideologically close: Pannella had managed to obtain the permission because the Italian Socialist Party (PSI) lacked internal support to remove its traditional symbols, which included the Marxist hammer and sickle. In 1980, it decided to add a thick, diagonal black armband as a sign of mourning to its logo to pay homage to the part of humanity which was victim of hunger and war, reflecting its internationalist turn.

In the 1980s, the party focused more on international and European issues. Affiliated to the Coordination of European Green and Radical Parties/European Green Coordination, Pannella was a member of the European Parliament since 1979 and led the party into new battles against hunger and in favour of further European integration. The party European affiliation were the Technical Group of Independents (1979–1984), Non-Inscrits (1984–1989) and Green Group. In 1989, the party was transformed into the Transnational Radical Party, a non-governmental organisation working at the United Nations and coordinating the efforts of several national parties and groupings mainly in support of human rights. The Radicals continued to participate in elections through the Antiprohibitionists on Drugs list, the Rainbow Greens, the Pannella List, the Bonino List and the Bonino-Pannella List. In 2001 they re-organised themselves as a party with the Italian Radicals and Bonino served in two governments (Prodi II – 2006–2008 and Letta – 2013–2014). Pannella died after a long illness in 2016.

== Ideology ==
The PR gave expression to the transformation of Italian society towards more liberal behaviour and ideas in the post-war period. An anti-clerical party, it placed itself within the libertarian left, often working for the unity of all the parties of the Italian left and proposing the adoption of an American-style electoral system based on first-past-the-post voting and the transformation of Italian institutions toward a presidential system, but also often being rejected by certain areas of the left itself, especially those linked with the Italian Communist Party, due to the Radicals' strong support of anti-communism, their economic liberalism, and their belief in social, religious, political, economic, and sexual freedoms. The party was also known for its strong belief in direct democracy and especially for its promotion of referendums.

== Associations ==
In the 1960s, the PR launched the Italian League for Divorce (Lega Italiana per il Divorzio, LID), which succeeded in marshalling together the secular parties into a unified political alliance and getting the law on divorce approved. During the 1970s, the PR helped launch the Women's Liberation Movement (Movimento di Liberazione della Donna, MLD) by supporting the activities of the Italian Centre for Sterilisation and Abortion (Centro Italiano Sterilizzazioni e Aborti, CISA) and by giving its support to the Italian Revolutionary Homosexual United Front (Fronte Unitario Omosessuale Rivoluzionario Italiano, FUORI), one of the first Italian homosexual associations. All the aforementioned groups, as well as many others, were part of a Radical movement that was organised as a federation of single-issue associations rather than a united party.

The Italian League for Divorce developed a broad following with the 1974 referendum to repeal the Divorce Law which had been passed three years prior. The referendum was initiated by Gabrio Lombardi with the support of the Christian Church as a form of reactionary opposition to legal divorce. The campaign for a no vote, in opposition to the Christian Democrats, was mostly led by unofficial party leader Marco Pannella, who was a fierce champion for the rights of woman. This led to further connections with left-wing groups within Italy at the time such as the Italian Socialist Party and the Italian Communist Party. Because of the enormous campaigning effort done by Pannella, the divorce referendum resulted in around 60% of citizens voting in favour of protecting divorce laws, and this was considered to be largely to the credit of Radical Party, which emboldened the LID.

The PR found its first connections to Fuori! in the 1970s when Angelo Pezzana, a member of the Radical Party and one of the founders of the Italian Revolutionary Homosexual United Front, had attempted to further politicise the association and connect it with the party. In 1974, at the 14th congress of the Radical Party, Fuori! was officially federated as a part of the Radical Party, resulting in the dissatisfaction and withdrawal of some Fuori! members, such as Mario Mieli. By the 15th congress, which took place in 1976, Fuori! had announced a list of candidates to run for positions within the party, thus marking the first time in which Italy had openly homosexual citizens run as candidates within a party elections, and by 1979, Angelo Pezzana became a member of the Italian parliament. Pezzana was in office for less than a month before retirement, but continued to write on his experiences on the advancement of Italian homosexual rights, as facilitated by the Radical Party.

Considered an early example of a political party placing importance on environmentalist issues, from 1972 onwards the PR also formed environmental organisations, including the Friends of the Earth's Italian chapter, the League Against Vivisection and League Against Hunting.

== Popular support ==
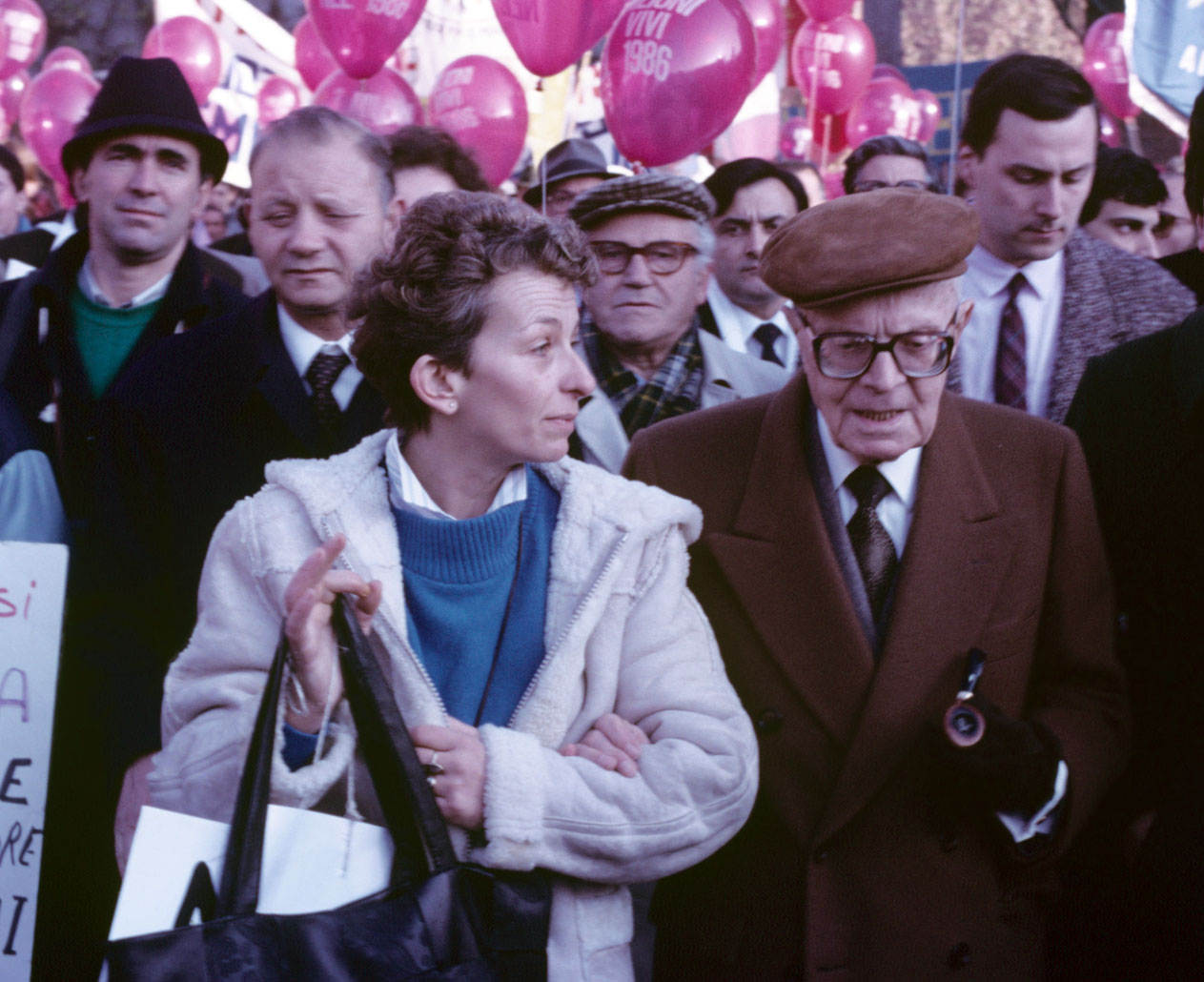
Emma Bonino with Italian President Sandro Pertini in 1985

The PR never gained massive support in elections, due to its loose organisation and eclectic profile. Additionally, the party did not file candidates for all the elections and sometimes even supported abstention from voting. The Radicals' strongest showing was in the 1979 general election, when it obtained 3.5% of the vote and 18 deputies. The PR did better in the North (especially in Piedmont) and in large cities (Rome, Milan, Turin and Naples) than in the South and in rural areas.

== Electoral results ==
=== Italian Parliament ===
Chamber of Deputies
| Election year | Votes | % | Seats | +/– | Leader |
|---|---|---|---|---|---|
| 1958 | 405,574 (9th) | 1.37 | 6 / 596 | – | Bruno Villabruna |
| 1963 | Did not run | – | 0 / 630 | ▼6 | Bruno Villabruna |
| 1968 | 1,540 (26th) | 0.00 | 0 / 630 | – | Marco Pannella |
| 1972 | Did not run | – | 0 / 630 | – | Marco Pannella |
| 1976 | 394,212 (9th) | 1.07 | 4 / 630 | ▲4 | Marco Pannella |
| 1979 | 1,264,870 (6th) | 3.45 | 18 / 630 | ▲14 | Marco Pannella |
| 1983 | 809,810 (8th) | 2.19 | 11 / 630 | ▼7 | Marco Pannella |
| 1987 | 987,720 (7th) | 2.56 | 13 / 630 | ▲2 | Francesco Rutelli |

Senate of the Republic
| Election year | Votes | % | Seats | +/– | Leader |
| 1958 | 363,462 (9th) | 1.39 | 0 / 246 | – | Bruno Villabruna |
| 1963 | Did not run | – | 0 / 315 | – | Bruno Villabruna |
| 1968 | Did not run | – | 0 / 315 | – | Marco Pannella |
| 1972 | Did not run | – | 0 / 315 | – | Marco Pannella |
| 1976 | 265,947 (9th) | 0.85 | 0 / 315 | – | Marco Pannella |
| 1979 | 413,444 (6th) | 1.32 | 2 / 315 | ▲2 | Marco Pannella |
| 1983 | 548,229 (8th) | 1.76 | 1 / 315 | ▼1 | Marco Pannella |
| 1987 | 572,461 (6th) | 1.77 | 3 / 315 | ▲2 | Francesco Rutelli |

=== European Parliament ===
European Parliament
| Election year | Votes | % | Seats | +/– | Leader |
|---|---|---|---|---|---|
| 1979 | 1,285,065 (6th) | 3.67 | 3 / 81 | – | Marco Pannella |
| 1984 | 1,199,876 (7th) | 3.67 | 3 / 81 | – | Marco Pannella |

== Leadership ==
- Secretary: Mario Pannunzio (1956–1959), Leopoldo Piccardi (1959–1962), Bruno Villabruna (1962–1963), Marco Pannella (1963–1967), Gianfranco Spadaccia (1967–1968), Mauro Mellini (1968–1969), Angiolo Bandinelli (1969–1970), Roberto Cicciomessere (1970–1971), Angiolo Bandinelli (1971–1973), Giulio Ercolessi (1973–1974), Gianfranco Spadaccia (1974–1976), Adelaide Aglietta (1976–1978), Jean Fabre (1978–1979), Giuseppe Rippa (1979–1980), Francesco Rutelli (1980–1981), Marco Pannella (1981–1983), Roberto Cicciomessere (1983–1984), Giovanni Negri (1984–1988), Sergio Stanzani (1988–1989)
- President: Elio Vittorini (1962–1964), Gianfranco Spadaccia (1964–1967), Marco Pannella (1967–1975), Adele Faccio (1975–1976), Marco Pannella (1976–1981), Enzo Tortora (1981–1986), Marco Pannella (1986–1989)
- Party Leader in the Chamber of Deputies: Marco Pannella (1976–1978), Emma Bonino (1978), Mauro Mellini (1979), Marco Pannella (1979), Adelaide Aglietta (1979–1982), Emma Bonino (1982–1983), Marco Pannella (1983–1984), Roberto Cicciomessere (1984), Francesco Rutelli (1984–1988), Giuseppe Calderisi (1988–1992), Marco Pannella (1992–1994)

== Sources ==
- General chronology of the Radical Party, 1955–1989.
- Massimo L. Salvadori, Enciclopedia storica, Zanichelli, Bologna 2000.
- Massimo Teodori; Piero Ignazi; Angelo Panebianco, I nuovi Radicali 1955–1977, Mondadori, Milan 1977.
- Lorenza Ponzone, Il Partito Radicale nella storia politica italiana: 1962–1989, Schena, Fasano 1993.
- David Busato, Il Partito Radicale in Italia da Mario Pannunzio a Marco Pannella, 1996.
