= Marco Pannella =

Italian politician and journalist (1930–2016)

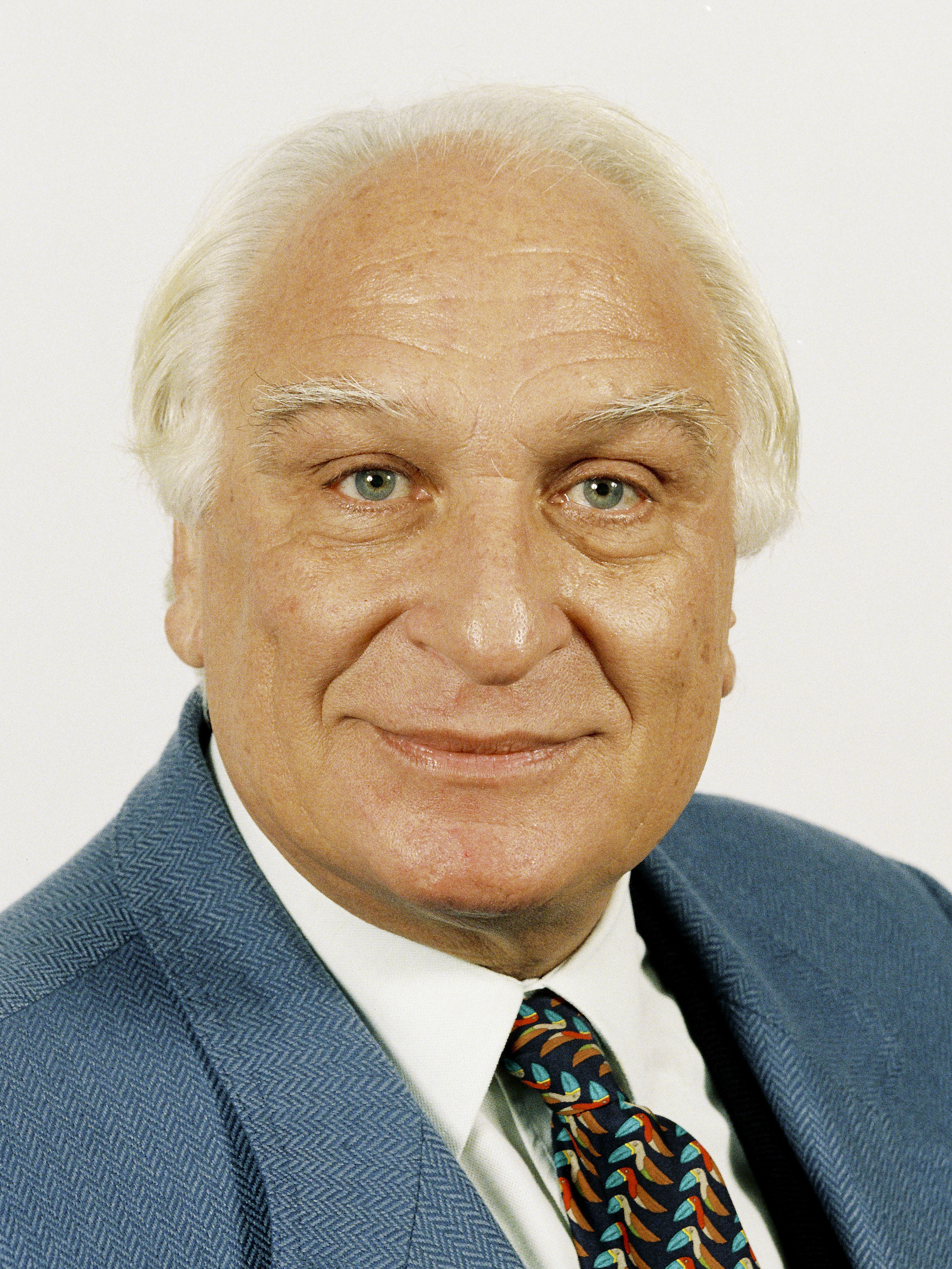
- Official portrait, 1994

President of the Transnational Radical Party
- In office 1 January 1989 – 19 May 2016
- Succeeded by: vacant

Member of the European Parliament
- In office 17 July 1979 – 14 July 2009
- Constituency: North-West Italy (1979–1989; 1994–2009); Southern Italy (1989–1994)

Member of the Chamber of Deputies
- In office 5 July 1976 – 14 April 1994
- Constituency: Turin (1976–1979; 1992–1994); Naples (1979–1983); Milan (1983–1987); Palermo (1987–1992)

Personal details
- Born: Giacinto Pannella; 2 May 1930 Teramo, Abruzzi e Molise, Kingdom of Italy
- Died: 19 May 2016 (aged 86) Rome, Lazio, Italy
- Party: PLI (1945–1955); PR (1955–1989); Pannella List (1992–1999); Bonino List (1999–2004); Italian Radicals (2001–2016)
- Domestic partner(s): Mirella Parachini (1974–2016; his death)
- Education: University of Urbino
- Profession: Journalist

Marco Pannella (born Giacinto Pannella; 2 May 1930 – 19 May 2016) was an Italian politician, journalist and activist. He was well known in his country for his nonviolence and civil rights' campaigns, like the right to divorce, the right to abortion, the legalization of cannabis and the abolition of nuclear power. Internationally, he supported human rights and self-determination causes, like the Tibetan independence and campaign against persecution of Montagnard in Vietnam.

He was the historic leader of the Radical Party (PR), the first political organization of Italian Radicals in the post-World War II period, founded in 1955. Between 1979 and 2009, he was a Member of the European Parliament, where he sat as a full member in the Committee on Legal Affairs, in the Committee on Budgetary Control and in the Delegation for relations with Israel. He was also President of the Nonviolent Radical Party.

He is considered to have been a left-libertarian and liberal socialist.

== Early life ==
Pannella was born in Teramo (Abruzzo) from an Italian father and a Swiss mother on 2 May 1930. He attended the classical lyceum Julius Caesar in Rome. In 1955 Pannella graduated with a degree in law from the University of Urbino.

== Political career ==
At 20 years old, Pannella became a national representative at the university level for the Italian Liberal Party (PLI), member of the student association Unione Goliardica Italiana (UGI) and at 23 he was President of the Unione Nazionale degli Studenti (National Union of Students).

At 24 he promoted the foundation of the Partito Radicale (PR; hereinafter the "Radical Party"). From 1960 to 1963, he was in Paris as a correspondent of the Italian newspaper Il Giorno. During his long political career, Pannella co-founded a series of organizations, such as the Italian league for divorce, the League for objection of conscience, the League for the abrogation of the Agreement between the Catholic Church and the Italian State (Concordat), the Piero Calamandrei Centre of Legal Initiative, as well as the Italian Association for Demographic Education (AIED). He has been at the forefront of the promotion of important reforms regarding narcotics and faced incarceration on various occasions for his civil disobediences. He played a prominent role in the movement that led to the legalization of abortion in Italy in 1978. He also promoted actions to grant electoral rights for Italians aged 18.

Engaged in the defence of civil rights in Eastern European countries, in 1968 he was arrested in Sofia for having distributed leaflets against the Communist regime. He was one of the first promoters and founders of the Green and ecologist political movements in Europe.

Over the years, he was engaged in Italy in the defence of civil rights as well as against the public financing of political parties and against corruption of Italian politics. Beginning in the 1970s, Pannella promoted a series of referendums on themes ranging from social to political issues, in particular on those relating to the legality of the State, the rule of law and to the administration of justice.

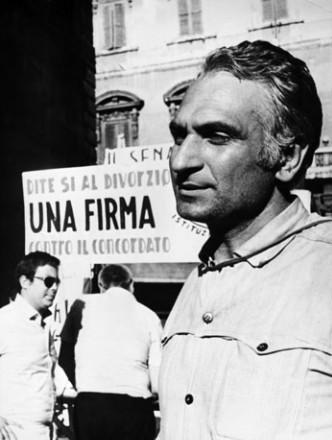
Pannella campaigning for the divorce referendum in 1974.

He was elected to the European Parliament in 1979. He sat in the Technical Group of Independents which was a technical alliance of left wing MEPs who were not allied with either the Soviet influenced Communist parties or the mainstream Social Democratic parties. He served as chair of the group along with the hardline Irish Republican Neil Blaney and Danish left-wing Eurosceptic Jens-Peter Bonde.Throughout the 1980s, he promoted international anti-prohibitionist campaigns on drugs and was one of the founders of the Radical Antiprohibitionist Coordination (CORA) and of the International Antiprohibitionist League.

A believer in Gandhian nonviolence, Pannella carried out several hunger strikes in Italy and elsewhere to defend civil rights and to end extermination through starvation the world over. This included a hunger strike in 2007, to protest against the death penalty. This strike was set off by the hanging of Saddam Hussein. A hunger strike in April 2014 to protest Italian prison conditions resulted in Pannella having to have surgery.

A disciple of Altiero Spinelli and Ernesto Rossi, Pannella was one of the first European Federalists and fought, through nonviolent means, for the creation of the European Union.

He was elected Secretary of the Radical Party in November 1981 and remained in office until November 1983. At the party Congress in Budapest in 1989, he launched the creation of the Transnational Radical Party of which he became president of the Federal Council on that occasion.

In 2003, he created together with other prominent European personalities the Medbridge Strategy Center, whose goal is to promote dialogue and mutual understanding between Europe and the Middle-East.

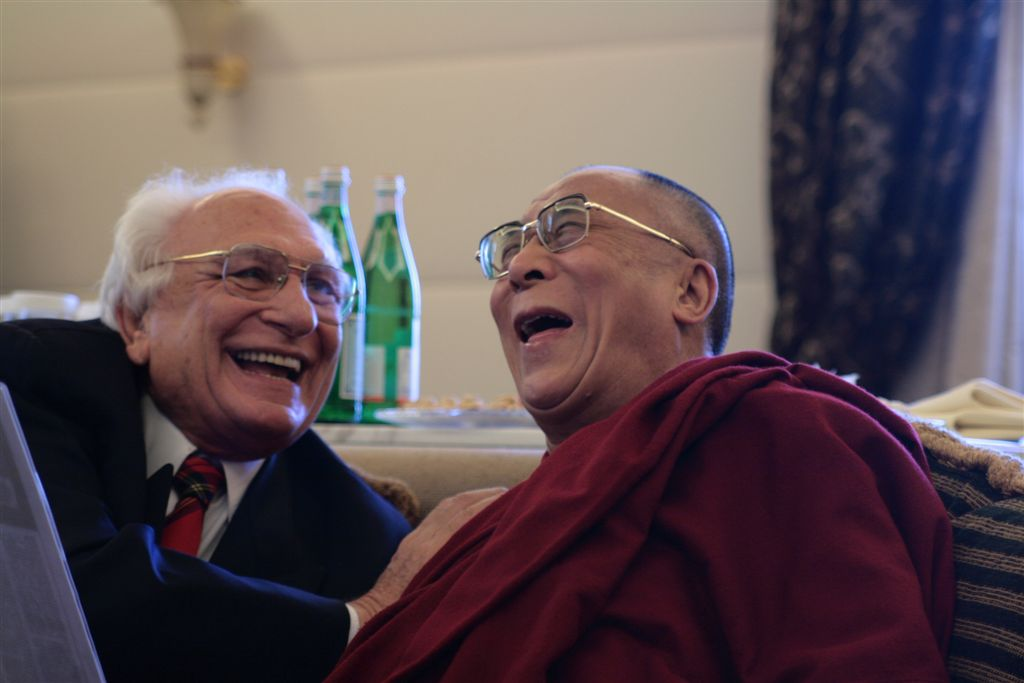
Marco Pannella with the Dalai Lama.

He was honorary President of the Party of the Rom (ROI) in the Czech Republic and he was also honorary member of the Socialist Slovene Youth. The Jewish National Fund dedicated him a reforestation area in the Negev Desert.

In October 2011, he became a member of the French Federalist Party in order to take part in the founding convention of the European Federalist Party which took place on 5/6 November 2011. Thus he became a founding member of the European Federalist Party.

== Personal life and death ==
Pannella had no children and was never married, although by the time of his death he had been living for several decades with his partner Mirella Parachini. In 2010, he alluded in an interview to the fact that Parachini and he had always been in an open relationship "without jealousy". In the same interview, Pannella came out as bisexual and said he had "three or four" significant relationships with men. He was an atheist.

A lifelong smoker, Pannella died from lung and liver cancer on 19 May 2016, after agreeing to be sedated. The Italian Prime Minister Matteo Renzi described him as a "lion of freedom".

== Electoral history ==
| Election | House | Constituency | Party | Votes | Result |
|---|---|---|---|---|---|
| 1958 | Chamber of Deputies | Roma-Latina-Viterbo-Frosinone | PRI - PR | 340 | Not Elected |
| 1976 | Chamber of Deputies | Torino–Novara–Vercelli | PR | 12,518 | Elected |
| 1979 | Chamber of Deputies | Naples–Caserta | PR | 35,498 | Elected |
| 1979 | European Parliament | North-West Italy | PR | 97,955 | Elected |
| 1983 | Chamber of Deputies | Milan–Pavia | PR | 18,620 | Elected |
| 1984 | European Parliament | North-West Italy | PR | 107,171 | Elected |
| 1987 | Chamber of Deputies | Palermo–Trapani–Agrigento–Caltanissetta | PR | 16,630 | Elected |
| 1989 | European Parliament | Southern Italy | Ind (Note: Elected in the Italian Republican Party list.) | 59,207 | Elected |
| 1992 | Chamber of Deputies | Torino–Novara–Vercelli | LP | 23,302 | Elected |
| 1994 | European Parliament | North-West Italy | LP | 98,005 | Elected |
| 1999 | European Parliament | North-West Italy | LB | 77,032 | Elected |
| 2004 | European Parliament | North-West Italy | LB | 13,456 | Elected |
