= Liberal Democratic Alliance for Italy =

Political party in Italy

Liberal Democratic Alliance for Italy Alleanza Liberaldemocratica per l'Italia
- Abbreviation: ALI
- Leader: Flavio Pasotti
- Founded: 26 November 2013
- Dissolved: 14 January 2023
- Split from: Act to Stop the Decline
- Succeeded by: European Liberal Democrats
- Ideology: Liberalism; Economic liberalism
- Political position: Centre
- Colours: Navy blue

Website
- www.alleanzaliberaldemocratica.it

The Liberal Democratic Alliance for Italy (Alleanza Liberaldemocratica per l'Italia, ALI) was a liberal political party in Italy.

ALI was launched in November 2013 by some leading members of Act to Stop the Decline (FFD), who disagreed with the political line traced by Michele Boldrin, FFD's new leader. These included Oscar Giannino (who led FFD in the 2013 general election), Alessandro De Nicola and Silvia Enrico. ALI's founders aimed at joining the Alliance of Liberals and Democrats for Europe Party (ALDE Party).

In November 2013 ALI and Civic Choice (SC) signed a pact of permanent consultation. Also in November, the party's founding convention was attended by prominent members of SC, including Pietro Ichino and Enrico Zanetti, and endorsed by Graham Watson, ALDE Party president. In March 2014 Ichino, who had since left SC, was elected president of ALI and Enrico secretary. Leading members of SC and the Italian Liberal Party (PLI) joined ALI's national council. In the 2014 European Parliament election ALI supported the European Choice list, which obtained 0.7% of the vote.

In the 2018 general election ALI joined forces with 10 Times Better, which obtained a mere 0.1% of the vote.

In March 2021 Carlo Cottarelli, a former director of the International Monetary Fund, was chosen by ALI, Carlo Calenda's Action (A), Emma Bonino's More Europe (+E), the Italian Republican Party (PRI) and The Liberals to head of a scientific committee designed to elaborate of a joint political program. Throughout 2021 the parties held joint meetings and in February 2022 ALI took part to Action's first congress.

The party merged into European Liberal Democrats on 14 January 2023.

== Leadership ==
- President: Silvia Enrico (2013–2014), Pietro Ichino (2014–2015), Flavio Pasotti (2015–2023)
- Secretary: Silvia Enrico (2014–2017), Franco Turco (2017–2023)
- Tresaurer: Giusi Pesce (2017–2023)
