= Michele Boldrin =

Italian-American economist (born 1956)

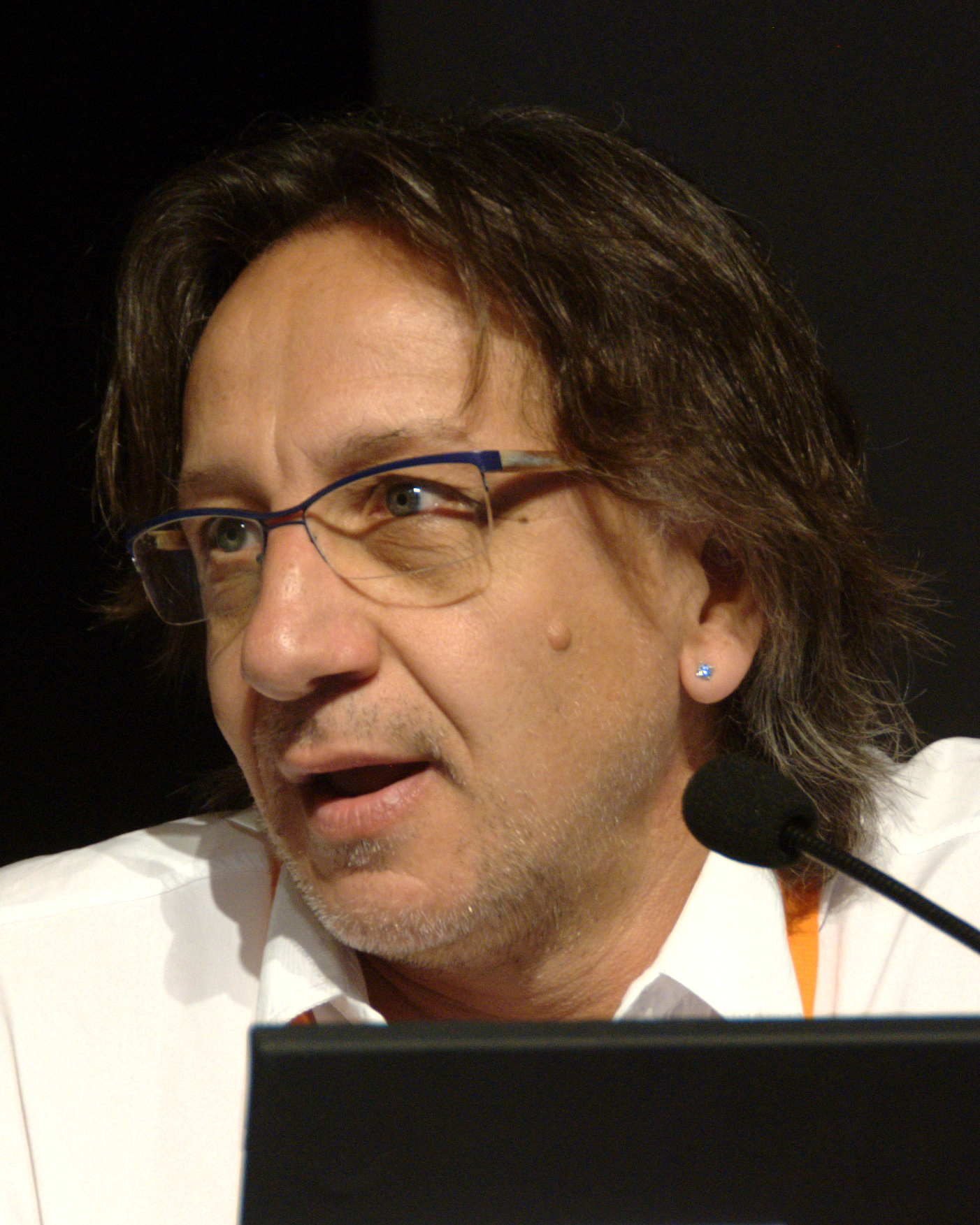
- Boldrin in 2010
- Born: 20 August 1956 (age 70); Padua, Italy

Academic background
- Education: Ca' Foscari University of Venice; University of Rochester
- Doctoral advisor: Lionel W. McKenzie

Academic work
- Discipline: Macroeconomics, general equilibrium, public policy
- Institutions: Washington University in St. Louis
- Notable ideas: Policy functions, endogenous fluctuations and chaos in dynamic models, growth theory

Michele Boldrin (Italian: [miˈkɛːle bolˈdrin]; 20 August 1956) is an Italian-born academic, politician, YouTuber, and economist specializing in economic growth, business cycles, technological change, and intellectual property. He is the Joseph Gibson Hoyt Distinguished Professor in Arts & Sciences at Washington University in St. Louis and the Secretary of the Italian political party Ora! (“Now!”).

Along with his colleague and co-author David Levine, he was part of the group of 200 economists publicly opposing the American Recovery and Reinvestment Act of 2009.

== Early life, education, and career ==
Boldrin was born and raised in Padua and later moved to Venice. He did his undergraduate studies at the University of Venice. He then received his M.S. (1985) and Ph.D. (1987) in economics from the University of Rochester in New York under the supervision of Lionel McKenzie. Before moving to St. Louis in the Fall of 2006, he taught at University of Chicago (1986–1987), UCLA (1987–1994), Kellogg School of Management (1990–1994), Charles III University of Madrid (1994–1999), and University of Minnesota (1999–2006). He is a research fellow at the Federal Reserve Bank of St. Louis since 2006.

Boldrin is a Fellow of the Econometric Society, a past Associate Editor of Econometrica, and past editor and current associate editor of the Review of Economic Dynamics, among other academic journals. He co-wrote four books and was a visiting professor in Barcelona, Rio de Janeiro, Mexico City, Tokyo, and a number of other places. He is affiliated with CEPR and director of FEDEA. He is one of the founding editors of the Italian blog noiseFromAmerika, and he contributes regularly to Against Monopoly and Nada es Gratis, which are respectively in English and Spanish. His two most recent books are Against Intellectual Monopoly, coauthored with David K. Levine (CUP, 2008) and Tremonti, istruzioni per il disuso, co-authored with Alberto Bisin, Sandro Brusco, Andrea Moro, and Giulio Zanella (Ancora, 2010), in Italian.

== Research ==
Boldrin conducts ongoing research in dynamic general equilibrium theory, focusing specifically on the sources of business fluctuations, growth and development, technological innovation, and intellectual property. Collaborating with David K. Levine, Boldrin examines the role played by competitive versus monopolistic markets in growth and innovation. They posit that little evidence exists for the presence of increasing returns at the aggregate level, and thus argue that there is no reason to believe that increasing returns play an important role in actual economic growth. This implies that, in theory as in practice, competitive markets favor and promote continued growth and innovation, whereas monopoly power is not necessary and probably harmful to technological change and economic development. Their theory concludes that existing claims for the necessity of intellectual property in the process of growth and innovation are greatly exaggerated.

== Political activity ==
In July 2012, Boldrin co-founded the liberal and pro-European movement Fermare il Declino (“Stop the Decline”) together with Oscar Giannino, Luigi Zingales, Sandro Brusco, Alessandro De Nicola, Andrea Moro, and Carlo Stagnaro. The group published a manifesto calling for fiscal responsibility, economic liberalization, and reduction of public debt. In December 2012 it was formally organized as the political party Fare per Fermare il Declino (“Act to Stop the Decline”), led by Giannino, with Boldrin serving as national coordinator. Following Giannino’s resignation in February 2013 over a controversy about his academic credentials, Boldrin was elected party president at the national congress held in Bologna in May 2013. Under his leadership, the party joined the centrist Scelta Europea coalition for the 2014 European Parliament election, but obtained only 0.7% of the vote and failed to elect representatives. The organization was dissolved later that year.

Logo of Ora!

In September 2024, together with Alberto Forchielli, Boldrin founded the political association Drin Drin (“Ring Ring”), conceived as a preparatory step toward forming a new political party. On 12 October 2025 the movement was formally reconstituted as the political party Ora! (“Now!”) at its founding congress (10–12 October 2025) after a year-long incubation as the Drin Drin association; the congress elected Boldrin as its first Secretary and Alberto Forchielli as President.

Michele Boldrin formally announced his candidacy for Mayor of Venice in the 2026 municipal elections with Ora!, during a public conference held at the M9 Meet hall in Mestre. He leads an autonomous centrist coalition focused on innovation and advanced services, as an alternative to the traditional centre-left and centre-right blocs.

== Political and scientific views ==
During his youth, he took part in extraparliamentary left-wing groups and later became a member of the Italian Communist Party, serving between 1975 and 1978 in the Venetian provincial secretariat of the party's youth wing, the FGCI.

Before the 2013 Italian general election, Boldrin co-founded with economist Luigi Zingales and journalist Oscar Giannino the political movement Act to Stop the Decline. Because of the poor results the party achieved in the 2014 European Parliament election, he resigned. Later on, he focused on his own YouTube channel and founded in late 2018 a think-tank called Liberi Oltre le illusioni (Free Beyond Illusions).

Boldrin has been an outspoken critic of Modern Monetary Theory, debating with American economist Warren Mosler, as well as Italian journalist Paolo Barnard. In his youth, he has been an Avanguardia Operaia supporter, while taking office as provincial secretary of the Italian Communist Youth Federation. Later on, he was a Republican Party (GOP) and Lega Nord supporter, advocating for more cultural liberal positions, and later endorsed Italian civil rights activist Marco Cappato. He is critical of More Europe, the party Cappato belongs to, especially criticizing their economic plan, as well as the alliances within the party, and defined the members of the party as "sell-outs". He compared the Donald Trump-led GOP to the Italian right-wing party Lega (after the rise of Matteo Salvini), as well as to Berlusconism. He criticized Nassim Taleb, as well as econophysics in general, debating with Italian geologist Francesco Sylos Labini, son of the Schumpeterian economist Paolo Sylos Labini.

== Public outreach ==
Logo of Liberi, Oltre le Illusioni

As a communicator and commentator, Boldrin has contributed to initiatives such as the blog noiseFromAmeriKa and the Italian economics site lavoce.info. He has been an economics columnist for Il Fatto Quotidiano, and a political columnist for Linkiesta, Il Foglio, and the Il Sole 24 Ore blog “Econopoly”. In 2017, encouraged by Alberto Forchielli, he began publishing educational content on his own YouTube channel. Between 2018 and 2019 he co-founded, together with Costantino De Blasi, Gianluca Codagnone and Thomas Manfredi, a collectively run YouTube channel called Liberi, Oltre le Illusioni. From the founding of the cultural association Liberi Oltre le Illusioni (autumn 2021) he served as president until 2024, when he stepped down.
