= Ora! =

Now! Ora!
- Secretary: Michele Boldrin
- President: Alberto Forchielli
- Vice-president: Marco Becattini
- Founded: Association: 6 September 2024; Party: 4 July 2025; 14 months ago
- Headquarters: Via Fiume 9; 35139 Padua, Italy
- Membership (2025): 15,000
- Ideology: Radical centrism Pragmatism; Liberalism
- Political position: Centre
- Colors: Yellow Black
- Slogan: "Il Coraggio dell'Ovvio" (Note: English: The Courage to do what's Obvious)

Website
- ora-italia.it

Ora! (stylized ORA!, English: Now!), previously named Drin Drin (English: Ring Ring) movement, is a centrist and liberal political party in Italy.

== History ==
On 7 July 2024, entrepreneur Alberto Forchielli, during a co-hosted YouTube livestream called Drin Drin, discussed an article published in Il Sole 24 Ore reporting that between 2008 and 2022, 525,000 young Italians fled abroad in search of higher wages and better job opportunities. When economist Michele Boldrin remarked on the lack of reaction among youngsters, Forchielli argued that a new party inspired by the ideas of Act to Stop the Decline (the party Boldrin co-founded in 2012) could be successful and offer new hope to young people in Italy. Boldrin was skeptical but challenged their viewers to find 1,000 people willing to volunteer for a new party by sending them an email within 15 days. The goal was reached overnight and fifteen days later, during a livestream, they announced that 9,100 people had sent an email. As a result, they decided to launch an association, provisionally called Drin Drin, as a political incubator for a new party, since both of them initially refused to become the leaders of the new party. On 6 September, the statute was filed, and on 15 September, the official website was launched, allowing people to register to the association.

Members can discuss their ideas in seventeen thematic groups on Discord, as each group is responsible for drafting multiple position papers that would define the manifesto of the party. Each commission emended the papers and the theses using GitHub. Media coverage of the launch followed in April 2025. On 18 May 2025, with about 13,000 members, over half of whom were under 40, the deadline passed to register in order to have active and passive voting rights for the party's founding Congress, scheduled for 10–12 October 2025. All registered members were eligible to run as delegates. In July 2025, internal elections were held and 373 delegates were elected. On 1 October 2025, it was officially announced that the name the newly founded political party will be changed in "Ora! Il Coraggio dell'Ovvio". After attending a political training school in Urbino, the delegates elected the 100 members of the Assembly, the executive committee using single transferable vote, Boldrin as secretary, and Forchielli as president during the founding Congress.

Acting on his remarks from the preceding months, Forchielli formally announced on 10 December 2025 his candidacy for Mayor of Bologna in the 2027 municipal elections with Ora!, campaigning as an "extreme centre" candidate against the left-wing incumbent Matteo Lepore and seeking support from the local right wing. Andrea Paccagnella, a chartered accountant, was the candidate of Ora! in the by-election for the Selvazzano Dentro constituency, which was called following the resignation of Massimo Bitonci, in which he obtained 4,32% of the preferences.

Michele Boldrin formally announced his candidacy for Mayor of Venice in the 2026 municipal elections with Ora! during a public conference held at the M9 Meet hall in Mestre. He led an autonomous centrist coalition focused on innovation and the advanced services sector, as an alternative to the traditional centre-left and centre-right blocs. Boldrin placed third with 3.44% of the votes and was elected to the city council. In the runoff election for the municipality of Mortara on June 8th, the list supported by Ora! won with 70.31% of the vote. On 21 September, Alfredo Mangano, a member of the Assembly, left the party and subsequently announced a breakaway party called Act to Change (Fare per Cambiare).

== Congresses ==
Congress	Duration (start—end)	Candidates	Elected			Membership (with voting rights)	Place	Ref.
Congress	Duration (start—end)	Candidates	90%		10%	Membership (with voting rights)	Place	Ref.
Congress	Duration (start—end)	Candidates	Local districts	Foreign districts	Universal district	Membership (with voting rights)	Place	Ref.
1st Congress	10 October 2025 – 12 October 2025	513	296	39	38	13,054	Abano Terme, Veneto	
1st Congress	10 October 2025 – 12 October 2025	513	373			13,054	Abano Terme, Veneto	

== Leadership ==
From 6 September 2024 until 4 July 2025, Michele Boldrin and Alberto Forchielli served as co-president of the Drin Drin association. From 4 July 2025 until 11 October 2025, they acted as ad interim secretary and president, respectively.

Name (born–died)	Term start	Term end	Duration
Secretary
Michele Boldrin (born 1956)	4 July 2025	Incumbent	1 year, 90 days
President
Alberto Forchielli (born 1955)	4 July 2025	Incumbent	1 year, 90 days
