= European Liberal Democrats =

European Liberal Democrats Liberali Democratici Europei
- Abbreviation: LDE
- Secretary: Piero Cecchinato
- President: Andrea Marcucci
- Founders: Giuseppe Benedetto; Alessandro De Nicola; Oscar Giannino; Sandro Gozi
- Founded: 14 January 2023; 3 years ago
- Dissolved: 2025
- Succeeded by: Liberal Democratic Party
- Headquarters: Via della Conciliazione, 10; 00193 Rome
- Ideology: Liberalism
- Political position: Centre
- National affiliation: United States of Europe (2024)
- European affiliation: Alliance of Liberals and Democrats for Europe
- Colors: Blue and Yellow

Website
- libdemeuropei.it

The European Liberal Democrats (Italian: Liberali Democratici Europei, LDE), often referred to as the European LibDems (stylised in Italian as: libdem europei) was a liberal political party in Italy.

== History ==
On 14 January 2023, a liberal constituent assembly was held at the San Fedele Auditorium in Milan with the aim of bringing together all the Italian liberal parties for the next European elections. The event was organized by its founders Giuseppe Benedetto, President of the Fondazione Luigi Einaudi, Sandro Gozi, MEP for Renew Europe, Alessandro De Nicola, President of the Adam Smith Society, and Oscar Giannino, former leader of Act to Stop the Decline. More than 40 speakers participated in the convention, including Carlo Calenda, Matteo Renzi, Benedetto Della Vedova, Marco Cappato, Luigi Marattin, and many others. At the end of the convention, the statute of the European Liberal Democrats Constituent was approved, to which the Liberal Democratic Alliance for Italy (ALI) and other minor parties and associations have joined, which explicitly provides for the creation of a single Italian liberal party, with the promotion of a democratic and competitive congress, that it will be the home of classical liberalism as well, and that it will have as its reference point the pursuit of the United States of Europe.

On 30 January, the regional councillor of Lombardy, Gianmarco Senna, who had exited the Lega on 24 November 2022, joined the party. During the 2023 Lombard regional election few candidates for the Regional Council, including Senna, ran in the lists of Letizia Moratti, then LDE endorsed Alessandro Maran's candidacy for the 2023 Friuli-Venezia Giulia regional election, and for the 2023 Italian local elections LDE supported Paolo Cianfoni's candidacy at Terni.

After the breakup of the alliance between Action and Italia Viva, LDE confirmed they would keep working to establish a unitary liberal list for the upcoming European Parliament election.

On 22 April Andrea Marcucci, the former leader of the Democratic Party (PD) in the Senate, left the PD due to disagreement with the political line traced by new secretary Elly Schlein and subsequently his entry in LDE, stating that his goal is to achieve a federation among liberal parties.

LDE joined the Alliance of Liberals and Democrats for Europe Party as a full member on 21 October 2023.

In March 2024, in the run-up of the 2024 European Parliament election, the party was a founding member of a broad, liberal and pro-Europeanist list named "United States of Europe", along with More Europe, Italia Viva, the Italian Radicals and the Italian Socialist Party, in order to overcome the 4% electoral threshold. In late April the list was joined also by L'Italia c'è.

Following the failure at the European election, LDE founded in March 2025 the Liberal Democratic Party, together with NOS, led by Alessandro Tommasi, Liberal Horizons, led by Luigi Marattin, and the Liberal Forum, led by Piero Ruggi.

== Composition ==
=== Founding members merged into LDE ===
Parties	Main ideology	Leader(s)
Liberal Democratic Alliance for Italy (ALI)	Liberism	Flavio Pasotti

Furthermore, LDE comprises several small parties, movements, associations, and committees, such as Liberal Alternative, Liberal Building Site, Clubs Together for the South, Liberal Democratic Constituent Assembly, Italy-Atlantic Studies Centre, The House of the Liberals, LibDem, Liberal Moderates for Italy, European Liberal Democrats (registered by the Fondazione Luigi Einaudi in 2022), Milanese Free Europeans, New Horizon Italy, XX September, Yourope, and Liberal Liberists.

== Election results ==
=== European Parliament ===
Election	Leader	Votes	%	Seats	+/–	EP Group
2024	Andrea Marcucci	Into USE		0 / 76	New	–

== Symbols ==
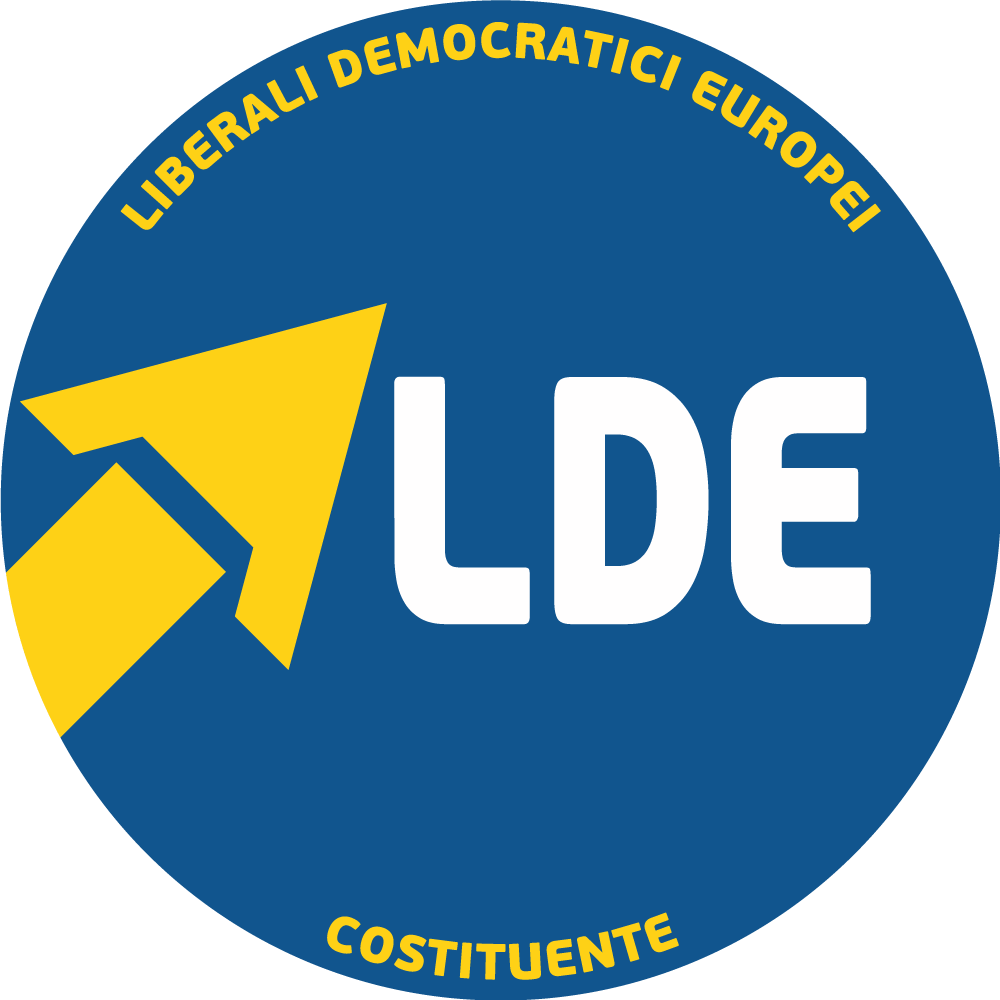
Initial logo

Official logo
