= Alberto Forchielli =

Italian entrepreneur and politician

Alberto Giacomo Forchielli
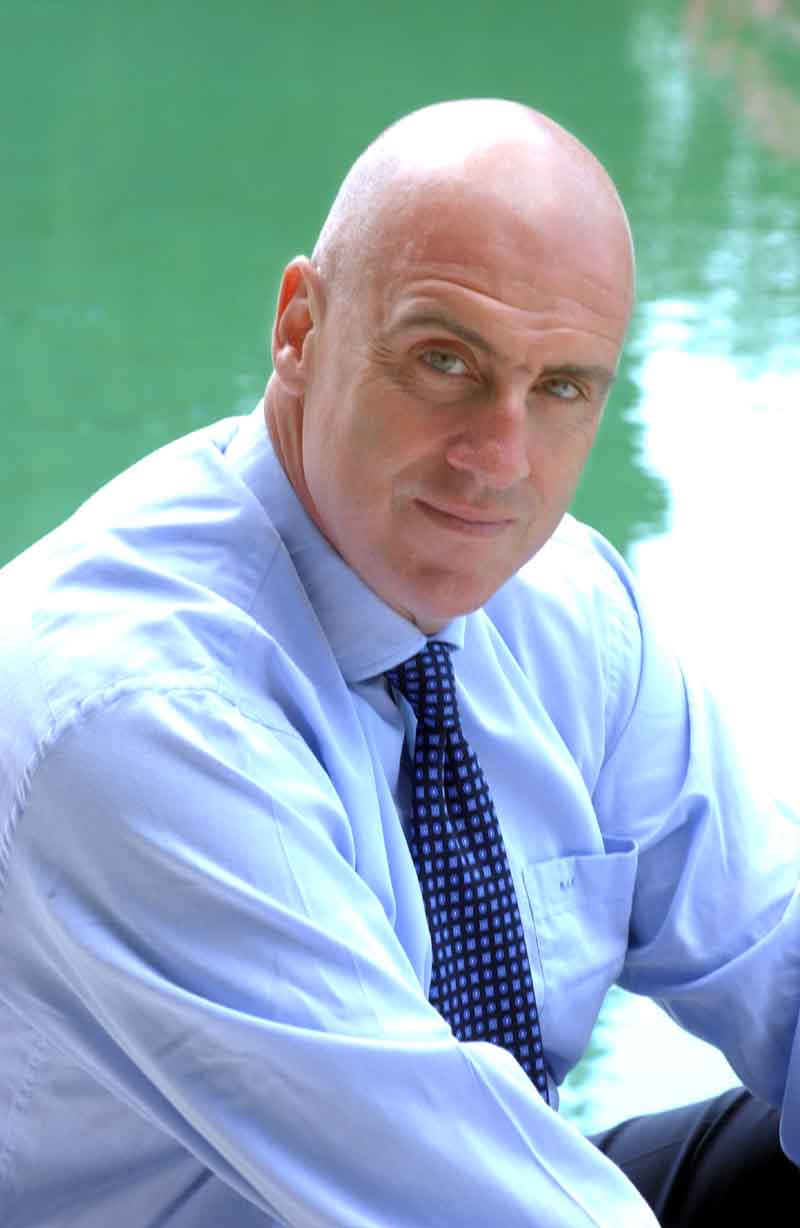
- Alberto Forchielli
- Born: December 28, 1955 (age 70); Bologna, Italy
- Citizenship: Italian
- Education: University of Bologna (BA), (MSc) Harvard University (MBA)
- Occupations: Entrepreneur; Commentator; Politician
- Known for: International affairs commentary, with focus on Asia, the United States, and Germany

Alberto Giacomo Forchielli (born 28 December 1955) is an Italian entrepreneur, political commentator, and politician. He is known for commentary on international affairs with a particular focus on Asia, the United States, and Germany. He has also been a consultant for multinationals, state-owned enterprises, and the World Bank, as well as the founder of a private equity firm.

== Early life and education ==
His father Paolo was a magistrate and then a professor of civil law and private law at the University of Ferrara and University of Bologna. His maternal grandfather, Giacomo Dal Monte Casoni, a lawyer, was a Christian Democratic deputy in the first legislature of the Italian Republic.

In 1978, Alberto Forchielli graduated in Economics and Commerce from the University of Bologna, and in 1981, he obtained a Master in Business Administration (MBA) from Harvard Business School in Boston, thanks to a scholarship from the Istituto Bancario San Paolo di Torino.

== Career ==
Just after obtaining his master's degree, he began working as managing partner/consultant with MAC Group, a strategic consulting firm, which led him to found its Italian branch. From 1992 to 1994, for the Ministry of the Budget, he contributed to the liquidation of the Cassa del Mezzogiorno and was a consultant on the restructuring program for the Ministry of Foreign Affairs. Furthermore, he worked for the Institute for Industrial Reconstruction as secretary general for privatizations. From 1994 to 1998, he was president of Finmeccanica in the Asia-Pacific region.

He was a Senior Advisor for the World Bank in Washington from which, in 2000, he was seconded to Luxembourg at the European Investment Bank to oversee the financial restructuring of the private sector and infrastructure development in the Balkans. In 2004, he founded Osservatorio Asia with the aim of analyzing and promoting economic relations between Italy and Asian markets. He has founded, worked for, and served on the board of directors of various Italian and foreign companies. In 2007, he founded Mandarin Capital Partners (now Mindful Capital Partners), a private equity fund that invests in European companies. Additionally, he founded Cleantech in Imola, a company active in the renewable energy sector with a particular focus on large photovoltaic plants. In 2014, he led and financed the establishment in Italy of the Roland Berger Foundation, which provides individual support for talented students from disadvantaged backgrounds.

Logo of Ora!

He has been a guest on numerous television broadcasts, such as Matrix, Omnibus, Otto e mezzo, Piazzapulita, Non è l'Arena, L'aria che tira, and Tagadà. Maurizio Crozza has frequently imitated him on the program Fratelli di Crozza starting in 2019. Forchielli maintains his own blog in Italian and is the curator, with Fabio Scacciavillani, of the YouTube channel and podcast Inglorious Globastards, which deals with economic and political topics. In the past, he also kept a blog in Chinese and collaborated with the economic-financial dissemination site "Piano Inclinato". Forchielli and Scacciavillani collaborated on the creation of the animated series Clay Economy, distributed on RaiPlay in May 2023.

== Political career ==
In September 2024, together with Michele Boldrin, he founded a political association called Movimento Drin Drin, as a preparatory step for the creation of a future political party. One year later, by which time the movement had surpassed 14,000 members, it was announced that the party's name would be Ora!. Forchielli was then elected president of the new party during its founding congress in October 2025.

== Legal proceedings ==
On December 10, 2020, Forchielli was investigated by the Milan prosecutor's office for alleged tax evasion of 3.9 million euros between 2014 and 2018. On May 14, 2022, he was acquitted of all charges because "the fact does not subsist" (no case to answer).

== Works ==
- Cina. La conoscenza è un fattore di successo (China. Knowledge is a success factor), Il Mulino, 2007. ISBN 978-88-15-12065-6.
- Un anno da Shanghai (A year from Shanghai), Il Sole 24 Ore Radiocor, 2011 and 2012.
- Quaderni dalla Cina (e non solo) (Notebooks from China (and not only)), with Romeo Orlandi, KKIEN, 2014 and 2015.
- Trova lavoro subito! (Find a job now!), with Stefano Carpigiani, Sperling & Kupfer, 2015. ISBN 978-88-20-05913-2.
- Il potere è noioso. Il mondo globalizzato raccontato dal più anarchico degli economisti (Power is boring. The globalized world as told by the most anarchic of economists), with Michele Mengoli, Baldini+Castoldi, 2016. ISBN 978-88-68-52819-5.
- Muovete il culo! Lettera ai giovani perché facciano la rivoluzione in un Paese di vecchi (Move your ass! A letter to young people to start a revolution in a country of old people), Baldini+Castoldi, 2018. ISBN 978-88-93-88078-7.
- Fuoco e fiamme. Tutto quello che non ti dicono e devi sapere sul mondo di domani (Fire and flames. Everything they don't tell you and you need to know about tomorrow's world), Baldini+Castoldi, 2019. ISBN 9788893881845.
- L'arte della super-cazzola. Lessico essenziale dell’Italia che non ci meritiamo, dal 1861 al coronavirus (The art of the super-bullshit. Essential lexicon of the Italy we don't deserve, from 1861 to the coronavirus), Baldini+Castoldi, 2020. ISBN 9788893881845.
