= 24 Minuti =

Italian newspaper

- The last front page (Milan edition), 2009-03-31
- Type: Free daily newspaper
- Format: Tabloid
- Owner: Il Sole 24 Ore
- Founded: 20 November 2006
- Ceased publication: 1 April 2009
- Language: Italian
- Headquarters: Milan and Rome, Italy
- Circulation: 250,000 (2006)
- Website: www.24minuti.ilsole24ore.com

24 Minuti was an Italian free daily newspaper, published by Il Sole 24 Ore in collaboration with Il Sole 24 Ore Radiocor, in the cities of Rome and Milan in Italy.

Launched in 2006, it was the first Italian free daily newspaper devoted to an upper class readership. The owners decided to cease publication on 1 April 2009, due to low advertising revenue caused by the 2009 economic crisis.
