= Liberal Democratic Party (Italy) =

Political party in Italy

Liberal Democratic Party Partito Liberaldemocratico
- Abbreviation: PLD
- Secretary: Luigi Marattin
- President: Andrea Marcucci
- Founded: 8 March 2025; 18 months ago
- Headquarters: Via Vittorio Veneto, 7; 00187 Rome
- Ideology: Liberalism
- Political position: Centre
- European affiliation: ALDE Party
- Colors: Azure Yellow
- Chamber of Deputies: 1 / 400
- Senate: 0 / 205
- European Parliament: 0 / 76
- Regional Councils: 0 / 896

Website
- www.partitoliberaldemocratico.com

The Liberal Democratic Party (Italian: Partito Liberaldemocratico, PLD) is a liberal political party in Italy. Its leaders are Luigi Marattin and Andrea Marcucci. The PLD inherited one of its forerunners' membership of the ALDE Party and is now a full member of it.

== History ==
As both Action and the electoral list of United States of Europe — a joint list led primarily by Italia Viva and More Europe — failed to meet the electoral threshold at the 2024 European Parliament election in Italy, thus not electing any MEPs, Luigi Marattin (Italia Viva) and Enrico Costa (Action) published a letter on Change.org advocating for the creation of a unitary party to represent liberal voters in Italy. They emphasized that the party's leadership should be fairly contestable and that the party's political stance should remain independent from both the centre-right and the centre-left.

Following his party's defeat in the European election, Italia Viva's leader Matteo Renzi announced that the "Third Pole" instead be led by a third person; however, he later joined the centre-left coalition. Marattin condemned Renzi's statement, arguing that such a decision should be made by the party congress. In September, Marattin left Italia Viva and founded a political association called Liberal Horizons, with the goal of creating a roadmap for the establishment of a unitary liberal party, together with NOS, led by Alessandro Tommasi, and the European Liberal Democrats, led by Andrea Marcucci. A few days later, Costa left Action, after Carlo Calenda formed an alliance with the centre-left and the Five Stars Movement for the 2024 Ligurian regional election, and rejoined his former party of Forza Italia.

On 22 and 23 November, a convention in Milan called "The Courage to Go", marked the birth of the Libdem Constituent (Assembly), composed by LDE, Liberal Horizons, NOS, the Liberal Forum, and the Reformist Ecologist Pact (PER). On 8 March 2025, the party was officially launched at a convention in Rome, where the party's name and logo were unveiled, and it was announced that the founding congress would be held in June. On 28 June, Marattin was elected by acclamation as the new secretary of the party, while Marcucci was appointed president.

== Founding members ==
Parties	Main ideology	Leader(s)
European Liberal Democrats (LDE)	Liberalism	Andrea Marcucci
Liberal Forum (LF)	Liberalism	Piero Ruggi
NOS	Liberalism	Alessandro Tommasi
Liberal Horizons (OL)	Liberalism	Luigi Marattin

== Leadership ==
- Secretary: Luigi Marattin (2025–present)
- President: Andrea Marcucci (2025–present)

== Symbol ==
Electoral logo
