= 24ore.tv =

- Logo of 24ore.tv
- Country: Italy
- Broadcast area: Italy

Programming
- Language(s): Italian
- Picture format: 4:3 SDTV

Ownership
- Owner: Il Sole 24 Ore

History
- Launched: April 2001
- Closed: January 1, 2007

Links
- Website: http://www.24oretv.ilsole24ore.com/

24ore.tv was a financial-news TV channel in Italian founded by Il Sole 24 Ore in 2001.

It was also launched on web TV, on Hotbird and on digital television in Italy on Mediaset multiplex.

It broadcast financial news bulletins, talk shows and documentaries. During the night, it was shown on Radio 24.

It was closed in 2007 due to low-revenue and technical problems.
