= Luigi Marattin =

Italian politician, economist, and academic professor (born 1979)

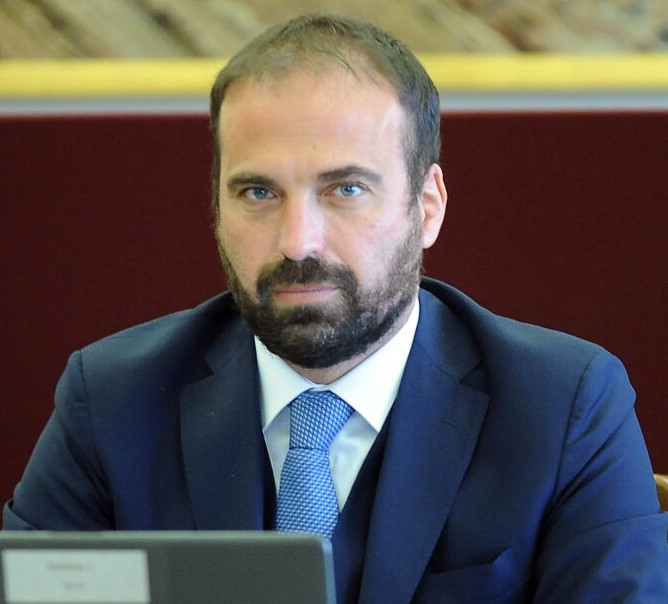

Secretary of the Liberal Democratic Party
- Incumbent
- Assumed office 28 June 2025
- Preceded by: Office established

Member of the Chamber of Deputies
- Incumbent
- Assumed office 23 March 2018
- Constituency: Emilia Romagna

Personal details
- Born: 20 February 1979 (age 47) Naples, Italy
- Party: PLD (2025–present); IV (2019–2024); PD (2007–2019); DS (2004–2007)
- Education: University of Ferrara, University of Warwick, University of Siena (PhD)
- Website: luigimarattin.it

Luigi Marattin (born 20 February 1979) is an Italian politician and economist, secretary of the Liberal Democratic Party since 2025.

== Early life and career ==
Marattin was born in Naples on 20 February 1979 of Neapolitan parents; his father was a chemical engineer of Venetian origins, and his mother was a housewife. Moving to Brindisi, he attended most of the elementary schools there and then, in 1988, he moved to Ferrara where he attended the Scientific High School and graduated cum laude in Economics of public administrations and international institutions at the University of Ferrara in 2001. In 2002 he studied for a Master of Science in Economics at the University of Warwick in the United Kingdom.

In May 2007, Marattin obtained a PhD in Political Economy at the Department of Economics of the University of Siena. In October 2019, he began collaborating with the Italian newspaper Il Riformista, writing articles on political, economic and social issues. In 2020, he became an associate professor of political economy at the Department of Economic Sciences of the University of Bologna. His research interests focus on public finance and fiscal policy transmission mechanisms.

== Political career ==
Marattin joined the liberal political current Libertà Eguale of the Democrats of the Left (DS). In the administrative elections of June 2004 he was elected city councillor of Ferrara, among the lists of DS until 2009. He was a member of the Budget and Control Commission on local public services. He participated in the founding of the Democratic Party on 14 October 2007 and was elected in the first National Assembly at the founding primaries, on the lists in support of Walter Veltroni's candidacy as national secretary. He was then re-elected as a member of the National Assembly in the primary on 8 December 2013 in support of Matteo Renzi's candidacy. In October 2009, he was appointed to the board of directors of Holding "Ferrara Servizi", the holding company for the rationalization and reorganization of the shareholdings of the municipality of Ferrara, a position he held until December 2010.

From December 2010 to September 2014, Marattin was alderman for the budget and equity investments of the municipality of Ferrara. In that period he took care of reducing current spending, municipal taxes and above all reducing the debt of the municipality by more than a third. From 2014 to 2018, he was economic advisor to Prime Minister Matteo Renzi in a think tank together with Marco Fortis, Yoram Gutgeld and Tommaso Nannicini. After the end of the Renzi Cabinet, he was confirmed as Economic Advisor by the new Prime Minister Paolo Gentiloni, where he mainly dealt with public finance issues with the role of member of the technical nucleus for the coordination of economic policy. From March 2016 to June 2018, he was President of the Technical Commission on Standard Requirements.

In the 2018 Italian general election, Marattin was elected to the Chamber of Deputies with the Democratic Party's lists in the district of Parma – Piacenza – Reggio Emilia and became Group Leader of PD in the Budget, Treasury and Planning Commission. Until March 2022, he was a member of the parliamentary commission of inquiry into the banking and financial system. In September 2019, together Matteo Renzi and others, he left the Democratic Party and joined Italia Viva, becoming vice-president of the parliamentary group in the Chamber of Deputies. In October 2019, he proposed a mandatory identity document for registration on social networks. In July 2020, he was elected president of the 6th Permanent Finance Commission of the Chamber of Deputies. Starting in December 2020, as president of the Finance Commission of the Chamber, he promoted a reform of the Italian tax system, 50 years after the last reform.

On 9 September 2024, Marattin, together with around a hundred local party officials, left Italia Viva, disagreeing with the party's decision to join the centre-left coalition alongside the PD, the Five Star Movement, and the Greens and Left Alliance. He subsequently founded the association Liberal Horizons (Orizzonti Liberali, OL), a platform supporting the so-called Draghi agenda, which aimed to form a single liberal-democratic party within three years. On 8 March 2025, OL, together with European Liberal Democrats, NOS, and Liberal Forum, merged to form the Liberal Democratic Party (PLD). At the party's first congress, held in San Lazzaro di Savena, in the Metropolitan City of Bologna, on 28 June, Marattin was elected secretary by acclamation.
