= Moderates in Revolution =

Moderates in Revolution Moderati in Rivoluzione
- Leader: Gianpiero Samorì
- Founded: 2012
- Dissolved: c. 2018
- Headquarters: Viale Parioli 25, Rome
- Ideology: Liberalism; Conservative liberalism Classical liberalism
- Political position: Centre to centre-right

Moderates in Revolution (Italian: Moderati in Rivoluzione, MIR) was a political association founded in 2012 by the lawyer, banker and entrepreneur Gianpiero Samorì.

In the 2013 general election the party presented its lists in the centre-right coalition and obtained the 0.24% of the vote for the Chamber of Deputies and the 0.22% of the vote for the Senate, gaining no seats. In May Walter Ferrazza, a MIR member, was appointed Undersecretary in Enrico Letta's coalition government. In November 2013 MIR became an associate party of Forza Italia and Ferrazza resigned from Undersecretary, after that the newly-formed FI had gone into the opposition.

MIR and Renaissance, a party led by Vittorio Sgarbi, formed a joint list which ran its own candidates in the 2018 general election in Friuli-Venezia Giulia, gaining a few hundred votes (less than 0.1% for both the Chamber of Deputies and the Senate).

MIR subsequently joined Us with Italy, of whose executive committee Samorì became a member.
