= 2013 Italian general election =

- 24–25 February 2013

All 630 seats in the Chamber of Deputies 316 seats needed for a majority All 315 elective seats in the Senate 160 seats needed for a majority (Note: taking into account the Senators for life, who accounted for 5 seats at the time the election took place)
- Opinion polls
- Registered: 46,905,154 (C) · 42,270,824 (S)
- Turnout: 35,270,926 (C) · 75.2% (▼5.3 pp); 31,751,350 (S) · 75.1% (▼5.3 pp)
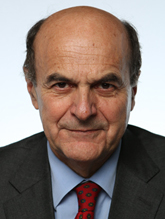

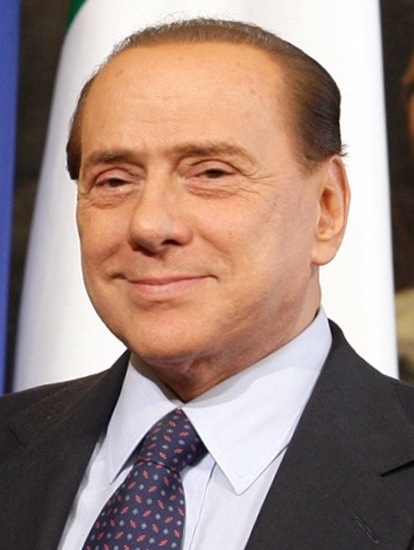

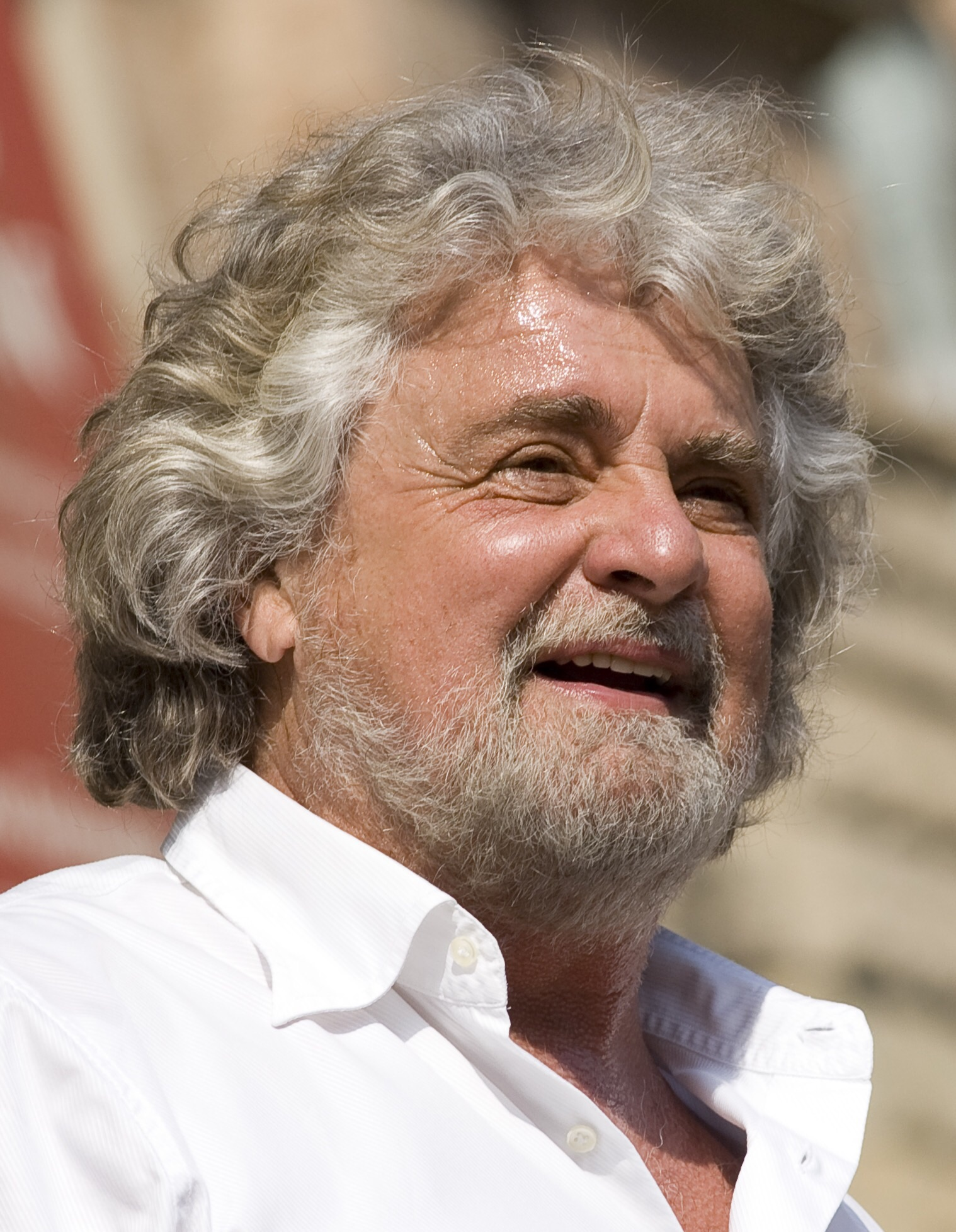

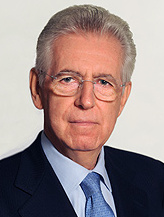
	First party	Second party
Leader	Pier Luigi Bersani	Silvio Berlusconi (Note: Although Berlusconi was the official leader of the coalition, the People of Freedom's candidate for Prime Minister was Angelino Alfano, while the Northern League's candidate was Giulio Tremonti.)
Party	Democratic Party	People of Freedom
Alliance	Italy. Common Good	Centre-right coalition
Leader since	2 December 2012	26 January 1994
Leader's seat	Lombardy 1 (C)	Molise (S)
Seats won	345 (C) / 123 (S)	125 (C) / 117 (S)
Seat change	▲134 (C) / ▲7 (S)	▼219 (C) / ▼57 (S)
Coalition vote	10,049,393 (C); 9,685,437 (S)	9,923,600 (C); 9,405,652 (S)
Percentage	29.6% (C); 31.6% (S)	29.2% (C); 30.7% (S)
Swing	▼7.9 pp (C) ▼6.4 pp (S)	▼17.6 pp (C) ▼16.6 pp (S)
	Third party	Fourth party
Leader	Beppe Grillo	Mario Monti
Party	Five Star Movement	Civic Choice
Alliance	—	With Monti for Italy
Leader since	4 October 2009	28 December 2012
Leader's seat	Did not stand	Did not stand (Senator for life)
Seats won	109 (C) / 54 (S)	47 (C) / 19 (S)
Seat change	New party	New alliance
Coalition vote	8,691,406 (C); 7,286,550 (S)	3,591,541 (C); 2,797,486 (S)
Percentage	25.6% (C); 23.8% (S)	10.6% (C); 9.1% (S)
Swing	New party	New alliance
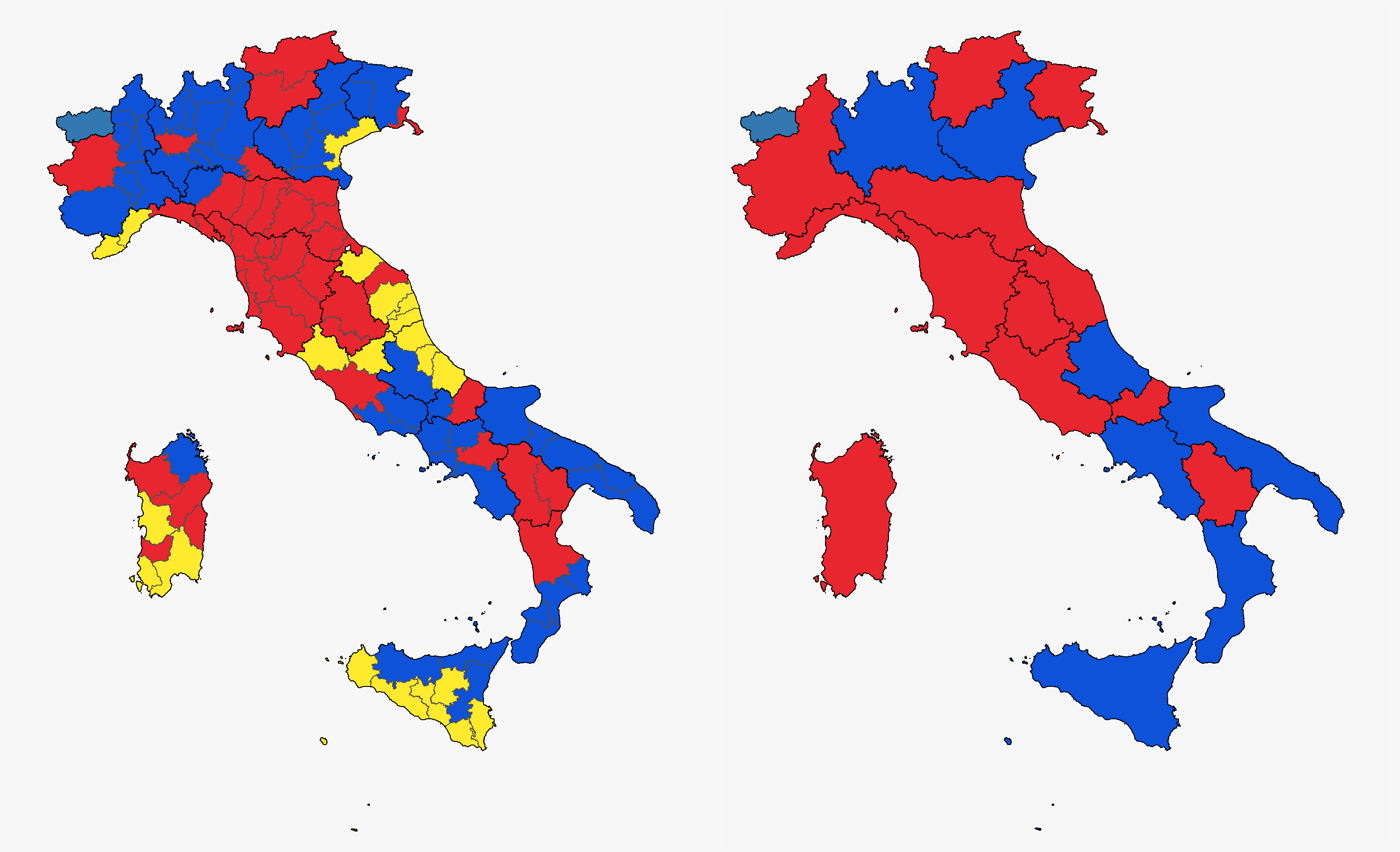
- Election results maps for the Chamber of Deputies (on the left) and for the Senate (on the right). On the left, the color identifies the coalition which received the most votes in each province. On the right, the color identifies the coalition which won the most seats in respect to each Region. Red denotes the Centre-left coalition, Blue the Centre-right coalition, Yellow the Five Star Movement, and Light Blue the Aosta Valley regional coalition.
Prime Minister before election
Mario Monti
Independent
Prime Minister after the election
Enrico Letta
Democratic Party

General elections were held in Italy on 24 and 25 February 2013 to determine the 630 members of the Chamber of Deputies and the 315 elective members of the Senate of the Republic for the 17th Italian Parliament. The centre-left alliance Italy Common Good, led by the Democratic Party (PD), obtained a clear majority of seats in the Chamber of Deputies thanks to a majority bonus that effectively trebled the number of seats assigned to the winning force and narrowly defeated the centre-right alliance of former prime minister Silvio Berlusconi in the popular vote. Close behind, the new anti-establishment Five Star Movement of comedian Beppe Grillo became the third force, well ahead of the centrist coalition of outgoing Prime Minister Mario Monti. In the Senate, no political group or party won an outright majority, resulting in a hung parliament.

In April 2013 a grand coalition was formed, consisting of Italy Common Good, the Berlusconi coalition and the centrists. Berlusconi and his allies withdrew support of the coalition and formed a new Forza Italia six months later, which meant that the PD dominated the government coalition until the 2018 Italian general election.

== Background ==
Following the European sovereign debt crisis, Prime Minister Silvio Berlusconi resigned from his position in November 2011. He was replaced as prime minister by technocratic Senator for Life Mario Monti.

In December 2012, Berlusconi announced his intention to run for prime minister for a sixth time. Shortly after, his party, The People of Freedom (PdL), withdrew endorsement for Monti's Cabinet and Monti announced he would resign after sending the annual budget to the Italian Parliament, which was expected by Christmas. The Constitution of Italy then requires an election to be held within 70 days of the dissolution of the parliament by President Giorgio Napolitano. Monti's resignation came after he said that, following the PdL's withdrawal, he "matured [to] the conviction that we could not continue like this any longer," and that he could not govern with a loss of support for his platform.

During Monti's tenure, Italy had faced tax increases and state spending cuts, as well as reforms intended to improve the competitiveness of the Italian economy. On the other hand, PdL parliamentary party leader Angelino Alfano told parliament on 7 December that Italy's debt, unemployment, and tax rates had risen in contrast to the economy since Monti became prime minister. In the approximately one year since Monti took office, unemployment rose by almost two percent. Previously Monti had controversially told the rising tide of youth unemployment to forget about a steady job for life, saying such is "monotonous [anyway and] it's nice to change and take on challenges." He also called for changes to Article 18 of the 1970 Workers Statute that forbids companies with over 15 employees from sacking an employee without "just cause", saying that it "can be pernicious for Italy's growth."

The same reforms and austerity-focused policies which upset many Italians are perceived to have improved international confidence in Italy. Monti was supported by other Eurozone leaders, such as Germany's Angela Merkel and former French President Nicolas Sarkozy. Merkel's spokesman, Georg Streiter, said that she had "always worked well" with Monti and "had a relationship of esteem"; however, when asked about Berlusconi, he said it was not up to him to decide domestic politics of other countries. German Finance Minister Wolfgang Schäuble added that he did not foresee "any destabilization in the euro-zone [but] expect[ed] Italy to keep going forward by respecting its European commitments." In reaction, financial markets fell on speculation of further instability; specifically, Italian 10-year bond yields rose by 0.4% to reach 4.87% and the Italian stock exchange's flagship index dropped by over 3.5%.

== Campaign ==
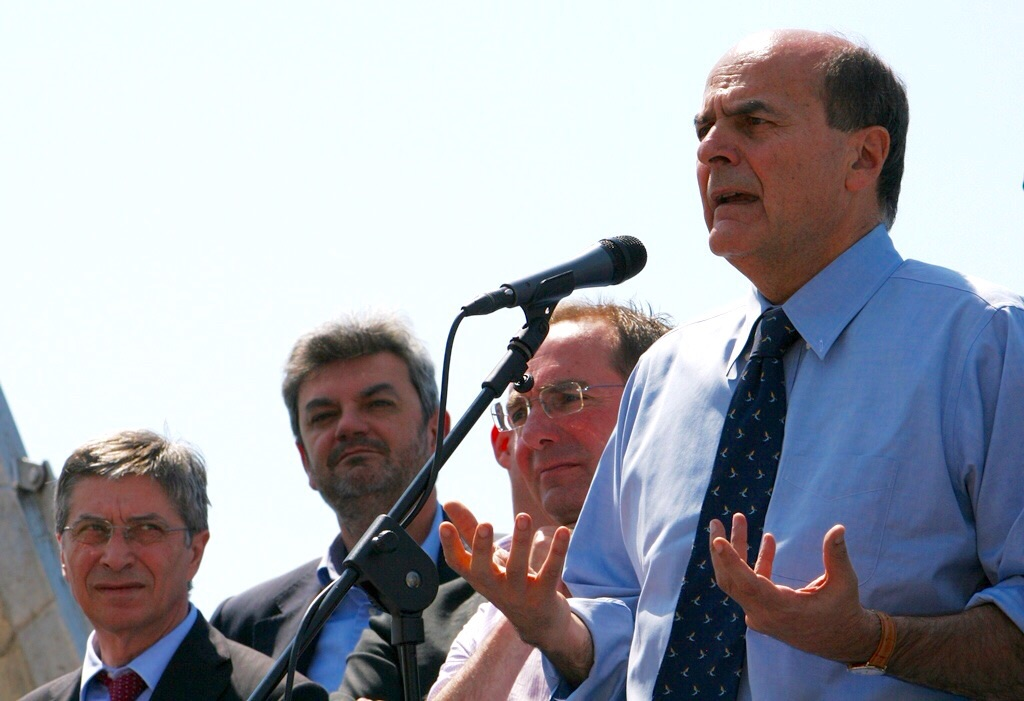
Pier Luigi Bersani with the president of Emilia-Romagna Vasco Errani during the electoral campaign

From the summer of 2012, a number of parties and movements from the so-called "Third Pole" of the political spectrum, including Pier Ferdinando Casini's Union of the Centre (UdC), Gianfranco Fini's Future and Freedom (FLI), Luca Cordero di Montezemolo's Toward the Third Republic (VTR), as well as a number of other politicians from both PD and PdL, pushed for direct involvement of Mario Monti in an election. Monti's statement that he would resign after the budget was passed, was suggested by Reuters to be indicative of him seeking to run for office.

Monti also told a press conference in France that "populism" was dangerous, and he further said that a failure to pass the budget "would render more serious the government crisis, also at a European level" and that his resignation would then be "irrevocable." The two largest parties in the parliament, the PdL and the Democratic Party (PD) said they would be willing to work together to expedite passage of the budget. PD Secretary Pier Luigi Bersani said: "Faced with the irresponsibility of the right that betrayed a commitment it made a year ago before the whole country, ... Monti responded with an act of dignity that we profoundly respect." PD Deputy Secretary Enrico Letta said of the PdL's withdrawal from the government that "the financial markets will judge this latest outburst by Berlusconi and they certainly will not judge it positively." Bersani had won the centre-left primary election shortly before the PdL withdrew from the government. Following a defeat in the primary, Mayor of Florence Matteo Renzi ruled out an approach, in writing, from Berlusconi's PdL to join the party during the election. In the following weeks, both PD and Left Ecology Freedom (SEL) announced their intention to hold primary elections for MP candidates on 29 and 30 December.

The possibility of Monti directly involving himself in the election was seen as increasingly likely after the government crisis in December later that year, as Monti was invited to a European People's Party meeting at which Berlusconi was present too. A few days later, Monti published a political agenda for Italy, dubbed the "Monti agenda", and offered it to all political parties. After the Third Pole promptly agreed to use it as their own platform for the upcoming elections, talks started regarding a direct involvement of Monti as premiership candidate. On 28 December 2012, following a 4-hour meeting and after being publicly backed by the Vatican regarding a potential bid, Monti publicly announced his candidacy as head of the Third Pole, which ran in the Senate as a unique component provisionally named "Monti's Agenda for Italy", and in the Lower House as a coalition of several components.

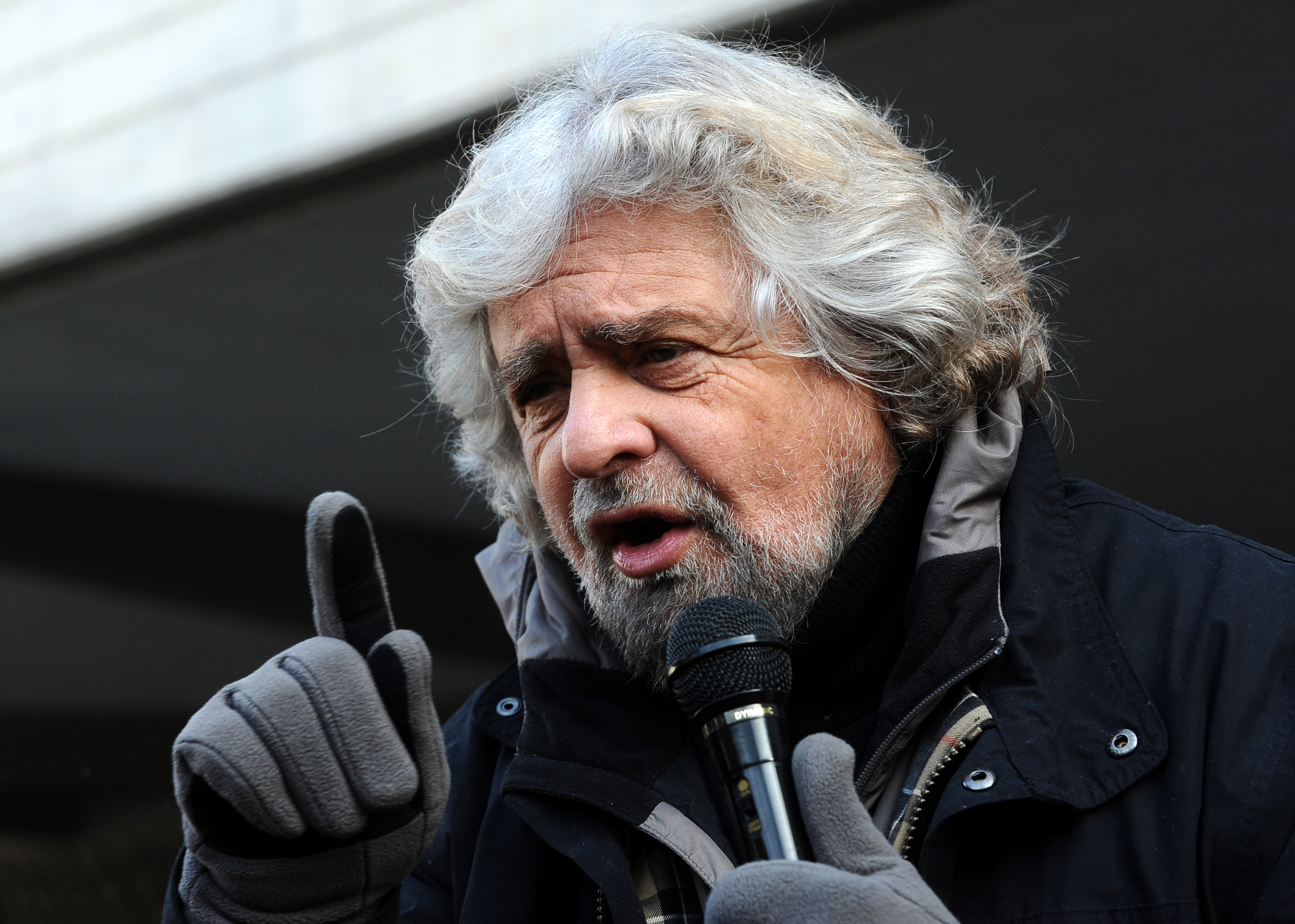
Beppe Grillo in Trento during the electoral campaign

Berlusconi said the platform his party would run on includes opposition to Monti's economic performance, which he said put Italy into a "recessive spiral without end." He also told the media, on the sidelines of AC Milan's practice session (the football club he owns along with Mediaset, the largest media outlet in the country): "I race to win. To win, everyone said there had to be a tested leader. It's not that we did not look for one. We did, and how! But there isn't one. ... I'm doing it out of a sense of responsibility." Berlusconi and Five Star Movement (M5S) leader Beppe Grillo criticised the euro-zone and Germany's influence on European policy. Grillo wrote that the average Italian "is literally terrified about the prospects of five more years of Monti-like rule."

On 8 December 2012, a new political party formed around a think tank named "Fermare il Declino" (Stop the Decline), on an initiative by the economic journalist Oscar Giannino and supported by various economists. On 19 December 2012, the name "FARE per Fermare il Declino" ("ACT to Stop The Decline") was chosen, and a list was presented with Oscar Giannino as PM candidate. The party's programme was also introduced, roughly inspiring to reduce the role of the State in the economy, reduce the national debt through disposing redundant assets, and to propose market liberalizations and privatizations.

On 29 December 2012, a new coalition, Civil Revolution (RC), was formed with the support of Italy of Values (IdV), Orange Movement (MA), Communist Refoundation Party (PRC), Party of Italian Communists (PdCI) and Federation of the Greens (FdV). It is led by celebrity magistrate Antonio Ingroia and Mayor of Naples Luigi de Magistris. FdS co-leader Paolo Ferrero said it would be a "Fourth Pole" that would bring new hope for the left. Civil Revolution attempted to solicit M5S to join them, saying "the door is open." Grillo, however, turned them down, writing on his blog "is the door for M5S open? Well, thank you, but close the door again, please."

On 7 January 2013, Berlusconi announced he had penned a coalition agreement with the Northern League (LN); as part of it, PdL will support Roberto Maroni's bid for the presidency of Lombardy, and he will run as "leader of the coalition", but suggested he could accept a role as Minister of Economy under a cabinet headed by another PdL member, such as Angelino Alfano. Later that day, LN leader Maroni confirmed his party will not support a new candidacy of Berlusconi as prime minister in the case of an electoral win.

== Electoral system ==
The electoral system had been last reformed by Law no. 270, 21 December 2005.

=== Chamber of Deputies ===
For the election of the lower house, all seats in the Chamber of Deputies (excluding one deputy for the region of Aosta Valley and twelve deputies for Italians residing abroad) are allocated based on the national vote in a form of party-list proportional representation with a series of thresholds encouraging parties to form coalitions. Voters cast one vote for a closed list, meaning they cannot express a preference for individual candidates.

Parties can choose to run in coalitions. Seats are first allocated based on coalition votes, then divided among parties belonging to the same coalition by the largest remainder method. To guarantee a working majority, the coalition or party that obtains a plurality of the vote, but fewer than 340 seats, is assigned additional seats to reach that number, which is roughly 54% of all seats.

The autonomous region of Aosta Valley elects one deputy through a first-past-the-post system. Italians abroad are divided into four constituencies, which elect a total of twelve seats based on proportional representation.

=== Senate ===
For the election of the upper house, a similar system is used. However, the results are based on regional, rather than national, vote. This means the coalition or party that wins a plurality of votes in each region is guaranteed a majority of the seats assigned to that region. As this mechanism is region-based, opposing parties or coalitions may benefit from the majority bonus in different regions. It therefore does not guarantee any party or coalition a majority in the Senate.

Three regions have exceptions to the system detailed above. In the region of Molise, that is granted two seats in the Senate, seats are allocated proportionally, with no majority bonus. The region of Aosta Valley, which elects one senator, uses a first-past-the-post system. Finally, the region of Trentino-Alto Adige/Südtirol elects seven senators with a limited compensatory system: six senators are elected in six single-member constituencies, while the seventh is allocated to the most underrepresented list based on the regional votes.

Six seats in the Senate are assigned to Italians living abroad and are allocated using the same system used for the Chamber of Deputies.

=== Constitutionality ===
At the end of 2013, Italy's Constitutional Court declared that this electoral law failed to meet a number of constitutional requirements. The electoral system for the Chamber of Deputies was later reformed by Law no. 52, 6 May 2015 (commonly called Italicum).

== Main coalitions and parties ==
Coalition	Party	Main ideology	Seats			Party leader	Coalition leader
Coalition	Party	Main ideology	C	S	Total	Party leader	Coalition leader
Centre-right coalition	The People of Freedom (PdL)	Liberal conservatism	191 (Note: Excluding FdI)	146	337	Silvio Berlusconi	Silvio Berlusconi
Centre-right coalition	Northern League (LN)	Regionalism	58	22	80	Roberto Maroni	Silvio Berlusconi
Centre-right coalition	Brothers of Italy (FdI)	National conservatism	11 (Note: In the PdL group)	10	21	Giorgia Meloni	Silvio Berlusconi
Centre-right coalition	Great South (GS)	Regionalism	10	3	13	Gianfranco Micciché	Silvio Berlusconi
Centre-right coalition	Movement for Autonomies (MpA)	Regionalism	4	3	7	Raffaele Lombardo	Silvio Berlusconi
Centre-right coalition	Popular Agreement (IP)	Christian democracy	1	0	1	Giampiero Catone	Silvio Berlusconi
Centre-right coalition	Pensioners' Party (PP)	Pensioners' interests	0	1	1	Carlo Fatuzzo	Silvio Berlusconi
Centre-right coalition	The Right (LD)	Neo-fascism	0	0	0	Francesco Storace	Silvio Berlusconi
Centre-right coalition	Moderates in Revolution (MIR)	Liberal conservatism	0	0	0	Gianpiero Samorì	Silvio Berlusconi
Italy. Common Good	Democratic Party (PD)	Social democracy	202 (Note: Excluding the Moderates)	104	306	Pier Luigi Bersani	Pier Luigi Bersani
Italy. Common Good	Democratic Centre (CD)	Social liberalism	9	7	16	Bruno Tabacci	Pier Luigi Bersani
Italy. Common Good	South Tyrolean People's Party (SVP)	Regionalism	2	3	5	Luis Durnwalder	Pier Luigi Bersani
Italy. Common Good	Moderates (Mod.)	Liberalism	1 (Note: In the PD group)	0	1	Giacomo Portas	Pier Luigi Bersani
Italy. Common Good	Left Ecology Freedom (SEL)	Democratic socialism	0	0	0	Nichi Vendola	Pier Luigi Bersani
Italy. Common Good	Italian Socialist Party (PSI)	Social democracy	0	0	0	Riccardo Nencini	Pier Luigi Bersani
Italy. Common Good	The Megaphone (Meg.)	Regionalism	0	0	0	Rosario Crocetta	Pier Luigi Bersani
With Monti for Italy	Union of the Centre (UdC)	Christian democracy	38	6	44	Pier Ferdinando Casini	Mario Monti
With Monti for Italy	Future and Freedom (FLI)	Liberal conservatism	24	7	31	Gianfranco Fini	Mario Monti
With Monti for Italy	Civic Choice (SC)	Liberalism	0	0	0	Mario Monti	Mario Monti
Civil Revolution (RC)		Left-wing populism	15	10	25	Antonio Ingroia	
Five Star Movement (M5S)		Populism	0	0	0	Beppe Grillo	
Act to Stop the Decline (FFD)		Economic liberalism	0	0	0	Oscar Giannino	

== Opinion polling ==
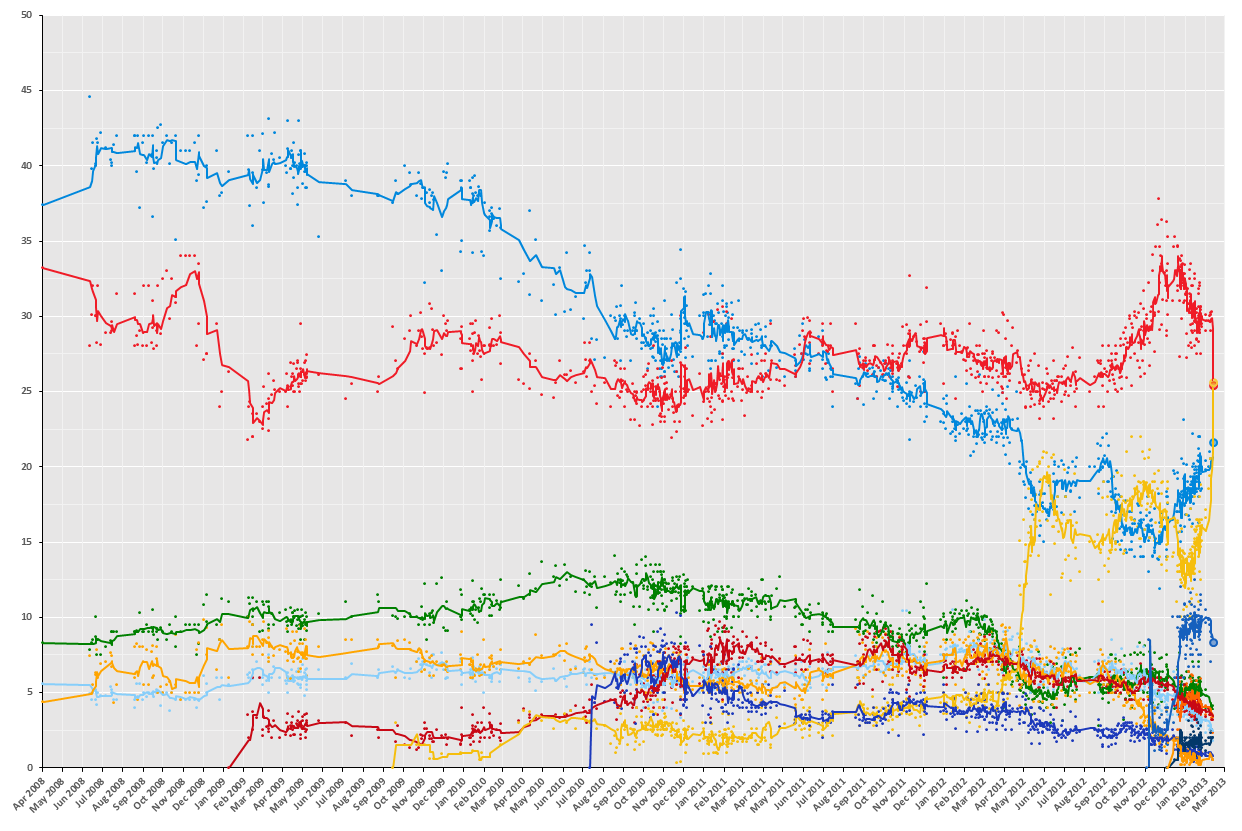
Six-point average trend line of poll results from 14 April 2008 to 25 February 2013, with each line corresponding to a political party PdL PD LN UdC IdV SEL M5S FLI SC FdI CD RC

== Results ==
=== Chamber of Deputies ===
==== Overall results ====
← Summary of the 24–25 February 2013 Chamber of Deputies election results →
Coalition	Party	Italy (19 regions)			Aosta Valley			Overseas			Total seats	+/–
Coalition	Party	Votes	%	Seats	Votes	%	Seats	Votes	%	Seats	Total seats	+/–
Centre-left coalition	Democratic Party	8,646,034	25.43	292	—N/a	—N/a	0	287,975	29.30	5	297	+80
Centre-left coalition	Left Ecology Freedom	1,089,231	3.20	37	—N/a	—N/a	0	17,434	1.77	0	37	New
Centre-left coalition	Democratic Centre	167,328	0.49	6	—N/a	—N/a	0	—N/a	—N/a	0	6	New
Centre-left coalition	South Tyrolean People's Party	146,800	0.43	5	—N/a	—N/a	0	—N/a	—N/a	0	5	+3
Centre-left coalition	Total seats			340			0			5	345	+99
Five Star Movement		8,691,406	25.56	108	13,403	18.50	0	95,173	9.68	1	109	New
Centre-right coalition	The People of Freedom	7,332,134	21.56	97	—N/a	—N/a	0	145,751	14.83	1	98	−178
Centre-right coalition	Northern League	1,390,534	4.09	18	2,384	3.29	0	—N/a	—N/a	0	18	−42
Centre-right coalition	Brothers of Italy	666,765	1.96	9	3,051	4.21	0	—N/a	—N/a	0	9	New
Centre-right coalition	Total seats			124			0			1	125	-219
With Monti for Italy	Civic Choice	2,823,842	8.30	37	—N/a	—N/a	0	181,041	18.42	2	39	New
With Monti for Italy	Union of the Centre	608,321	1.79	8	1,355	1.87	0	181,041	18.42	2	8	−28
With Monti for Italy	Total seats			45			0			2	47	New
Associative Movement of Italians Abroad		—N/a	—N/a	0	—N/a	—N/a	0	140,868	14.33	2	2	+1
South American Union of Italian Emigrants		—N/a	—N/a	0	—N/a	—N/a	0	43,918	4.47	1	1	New
Aosta Valley (UV–SA–FA)		—N/a	—N/a	0	18,376	25.36	1	—N/a	—N/a	0	1	+1
Others		2,443,360	7.19	0	33,867	46.77	0	70,721	7.20	0	0	—N/a
Total		34,005,755	100	617	72,436	100	1	982,881	100	12	630	±0

Popular vote (Party)
M5S	25.56%
PD	25.43%
PdL	21.56%
SC	8.30%
LN	4.09%
SEL	3.20%
RC	2.25%
FdI	1.96%
UdC	1.79%
FFD	1.12%
Others	4.74%

Popular vote (Coalition)
IBC	29.55%
CDX	29.18%
M5S	25.56%
Monti	10.56%
RC	2.25%
FFD	1.12%
Others	1.78%

Seat distribution (Coalition)
IBC	54.8%
CDX	19.8%
M5S	17.3%
Monti	7.5%
Others	0.6%

==== Italy (except Aosta Valley) ====
Coalition	Party	Votes	%	Seats
Italy. Common Good	Democratic Party (PD)	8,646,034	25.43	292
Italy. Common Good	Left Ecology Freedom (SEL)	1,089,231	3.20	37
Italy. Common Good	Democratic Centre (CD)	167,328	0.49	6
Italy. Common Good	South Tyrolean People's Party (SVP)	146,800	0.43	5
Italy. Common Good	Total	10,049,393	29.55	340
Centre-right coalition	The People of Freedom (PdL)	7,332,134	21.56	97
Centre-right coalition	Northern League (LN)	1,390,534	4.09	18
Centre-right coalition	Brothers of Italy (FdI)	666,765	1.96	9
Centre-right coalition	The Right (LD)	219,585	0.65	0
Centre-right coalition	Great South – MPA (GS–MPA)	148,248	0.44	0
Centre-right coalition	Moderates in Revolution (MIR)	82,557	0.24	0
Centre-right coalition	Pensioners' Party (PP)	54,418	0.16	0
Centre-right coalition	Popular Agreement (IP)	26,120	0.08	0
Centre-right coalition	Free for an Equable Italy (LIE)	3,239	0.01	0
Centre-right coalition	Total	9,923,600	29.18	124
Five Star Movement (M5S)		8,691,406	25.56	108
With Monti for Italy	Civic Choice (SC)	2,823,842	8.30	37 (Note: Incl. the Union for Trentino (UPT) party leader Lorenzo Dellai, who decided not to submit his own party list for the Monti-coalition, but opted to be a direct part of the Civic Choice list. – only for Senate in: Trentino-Alto Adige (Note: The party instead opted to be part of the Monti-coalition in the "Chamber of Deputies election")))
With Monti for Italy	Union of the Centre (UdC)	608,321	1.79	8
With Monti for Italy	Future and Freedom (FLI)	159,378	0.47	0
With Monti for Italy	Total	3,591,541	10.56	45
Civil Revolution (RC)		765,189	2.25	0
Act to Stop the Decline (FFD)		380,044	1.12	0
New Force (FN)		90,047	0.26	0
Workers' Communist Party (PCL)		89,643	0.26	0
Amnesty Justice Freedom List (AGL)		65,022	0.19	0
Die Freiheitlichen (DF)		48,317	0.14	0
CasaPound (CPI)		47,991	0.14	0
Tricolour Flame (FT)		44,408	0.13	0
I Love Italy (ALI)		42,603	0.12	0
Venetian Independence (IV)		33,217	0.09	0
Italian Liberal Party (PLI)		27,964	0.08	0
Sardinian Action Party (PSd'Az)		18,592	0.05	0
Venetian Republic League (LVR)		15,838	0.05	0
Protest Vote		12,743	0.04	0
Veneto State (VS)		11,398	0.03	0
Italian Reformists (RI)		8,248	0.02	0
Independence for Sardinia (IpS)		7,471	0.02	0
Italian Republican Party (PRI)		6,910	0.02	0
Sardinian Rebirth European Movement (MERIS)		5,897	0.02	0
Communist Alternative Party (PdAC)		5,196	0.02	0
The Pirates		4,557	0.01	0
Project Italy Movement (MPI)		3,957	0.01	0
Italian Missinian Refoundation (RMI)		3,091	0.01	0
United Populars (PU)		2,992	0.01	0
National Project (PN)		2,870	0.01	0
Thought and Action Party (PPA)		1,526	0.00	0
All Together for Italy		1,485	0,00	0
Popular Union (UP)		1,475	0.00	0
Atheist Democracy (DA)		598	0,00	0
Stems of Italy		586	0,00	0
Invalid/blank/unassigned votes		1,265,171	–	–
Total		34,005,755	100.00	617
Registered voters/turnout		46,905,154	75.20	–
Source: Ministry of the Interior

==== Results by region (except Aosta Valley) ====
Region	Italy. Common Good	Centre-right coalition	Five Star Movement	With Monti for Italy	Civil Revolution	Others
Abruzzo	26.2	29.5	29.9	8.9	3.3	2.2
Apulia	26.5	33.0	25.5	10.5	2.4	2.1
Basilicata	34.2	24.6	24.3	11.3	2.4	3.2
Calabria	28.3	30.2	24.9	10.5	2.9	3.2
Campania	26.0	35.6	22.2	11.3	2.6	2.3
Emilia-Romagna	40.2	20.9	24.7	9.3	1.9	3.0
Friuli-Venezia Giulia	27.5	28.0	27.2	12.9	2.1	2.3
Lazio	29.9	27.9	28.1	8.8	2.6	2.7
Liguria	31.1	23.0	32.1	9.9	2.1	1.8
Lombardy	28.2	35.7	19.6	12.1	1.6	2.8
Marche	31.1	21.2	32.1	10.7	2.2	2.7
Molise	28.8	28.4	27.7	10.7	3.4	1.0
Piedmont	28.3	28.1	27.5	12.1	2.1	1.9
Sardinia	29.5	23.7	29.7	9.4	2.8	4.9
Sicily	21.4	31.3	33.6	8.6	3.4	1.7
Trentino-Alto Adige	35.6	15.9	14.6	13.9	1.4	18.6
Tuscany	41.6	20.7	24.0	8.4	2.7	2.6
Umbria	35.6	24.3	27.2	9.6	2.5	0.8
Veneto	23.3	31.8	26.3	11.9	1.3	5.4

==== Aosta Valley ====
The autonomous region of Aosta Valley, in northwestern Italy, elects one member to the Chamber of Deputies through a direct first-past-the-post election. Some parties that formed electoral coalitions in Italy, might have opted to run against one another (or form different coalitions) in this particular region.

Candidate	Party (or a unified coalition list)	Total votes	%	Seats
Rudi Marguerettaz (SA)	Aosta Valley (UV–SA–FA)	18,376	25.36	1
Laurent Viérin	Progressive Valdostan Union (UVP)	18,191	25.11	0
Jean Pierre Guichardaz	Autonomy Liberty Democracy (ALD)	14,340	19.79	0
Roberto Ugo Massimo Cognetta	Five Star Movement (M5S)	13,403	18.50	0
Giorgia Meloni	Brothers of Italy (FdI)	3,051	4.21	0
Nicoletta Spelgatti	Northern League (LN)	2,384	3.29	0
Lucia Bringhen	Union of the Centre (UdC)	1,355	1.87	0
Fabrizio Buillet	Act to Stop the Decline (FFD)	748	1.03	0
Andrea Ladu	CasaPound (CPI)	443	0.61	0
Eros Campion	Nation Val d'Outa	145	0.20	0
Total valid votes		72,436	–	–
Blank/void/unassigned votes		4,733	–	–
Total votes		77,169	100.00	1
Registered voters/turnout		100,277	76.95	–
Source: Ministry of the Interior

==== Overseas constituencies ====
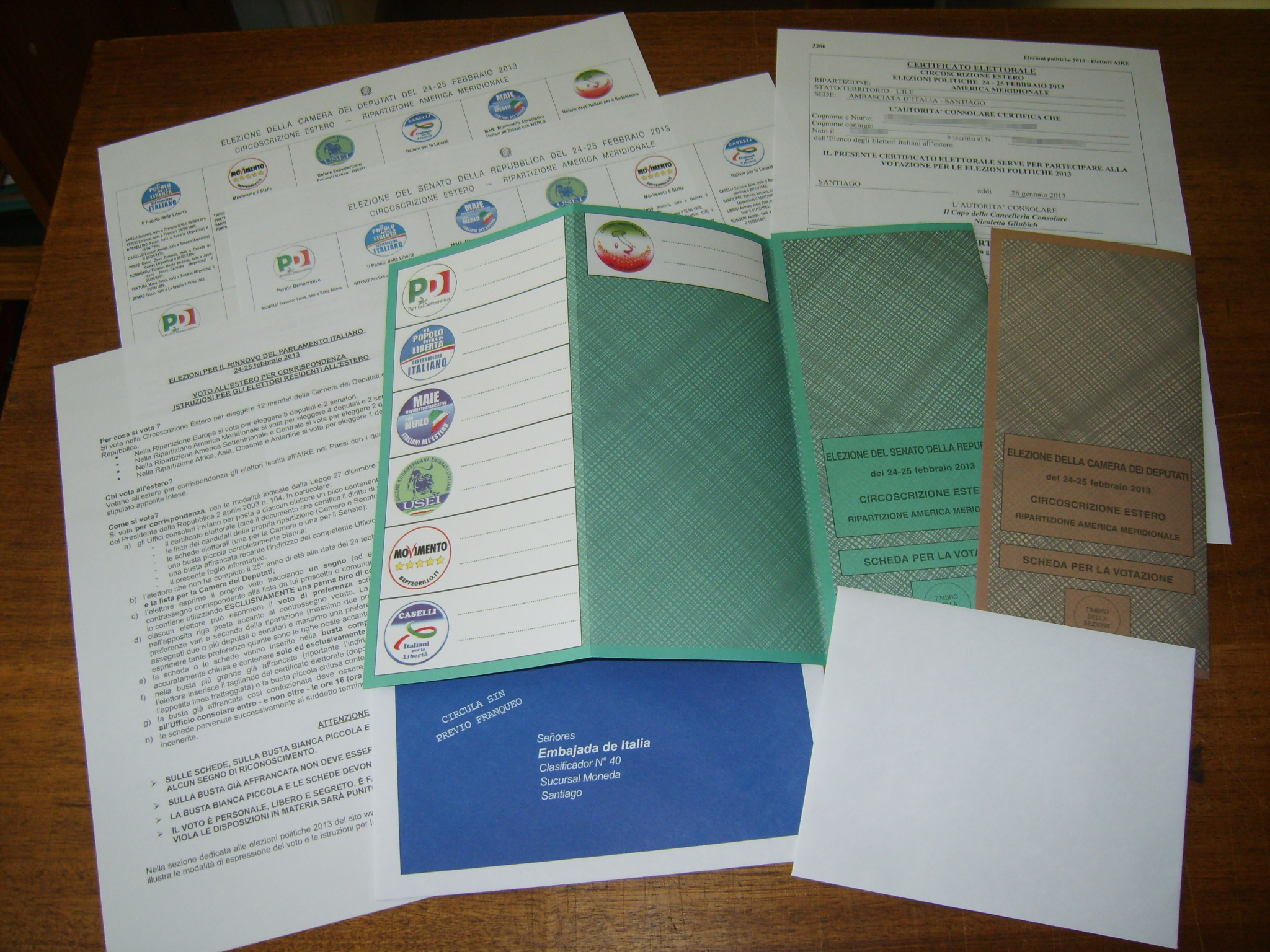
Electoral package sent to an Italian voter in South America

Twelve members of the Chamber of Deputies are elected by Italians abroad. Two members are elected for North America and Central America (including most of the Caribbean), four members for South America (including Trinidad and Tobago), five members for Europe, and one member for the rest of the world (Africa, Asia, Oceania, and Antarctica). Voters in these regions select candidate lists and may also cast a preference vote for individual candidates. The seats are allocated by proportional representation.

The electoral law allows for parties to form different coalitions on the lists abroad, compared to the lists in Italy. In the 2013 election, this freedom was used by Left Ecology Freedom to provide a list as an independent party, instead of making themselves available as part of the mainlands coalition with Democratic Party.

Party (or a unified coalition list)	Votes	%	Seats
Democratic Party (PD)	287,975	29.30	5 (Note: The 5 deputies from Democratic Party were elected by the following regions: Europe (2), North- and Central America (1), South America (1), remaining world (1).)
With Monti for Italy	181,041	18.42	2 (Note: The 2 deputies from the Monti-coalition were elected by the following regions: Europe (1), North- and Central America (1).)
The People of Freedom (PdL)	145,751	14.83	1 (Note: The deputy from the Berlusconi-coalition was elected by the following region: Europe (1).)
Associative Movement of Italians Abroad (MAIE)	140,868	14.33	2 (Note: The 2 deputies from MAIE were elected by the following region: South America (2).)
Five Star Movement (M5S)	95,173	9.68	1 (Note: The deputy from the Five Star Movement was elected by the following region: Europe (1).)
South American Union of Italian Emigrants (USEI)	43,918	4.47	1 (Note: The deputy from USEI was elected by the following region: South America (1).)
Italians for Freedom	22,348	2.27	0
Left Ecology Freedom (SEL)	17,434	1.77	0
Civil Revolution (RC)	16,033	1.63	0
Union of Italians for South America	11,330	1.15	0
Act to Stop the Decline (FFD)	10,195	1.04	0
Communist Party (PC)	6,977	0.71	0
Together for the Italians	3,838	0.39	0
Invalid/blank/unassigned votes	121,108	–	–
Total	982,881	100.00	12
Registered voters/turnout	3,494,687	31.59	–
Source: Ministry of the Interior

==== Map ====

Seat totals by constituency. As this is a MB election, seat totals are determined by the national popular vote, benefiting the largest coalition nationwide.

=== Senate of the Republic ===
==== Overall results ====
← Summary of 24–25 February 2013 Senate of the Republic election results →
Coalition	Party	Italy (18 regions)			Aosta Valley			Trentino-Alto Adige			Overseas			Total seats	+/−
Coalition	Party	Votes	%	Seats	Votes	%	Seats	Votes	%	Seats	Votes	%	Seats	Total seats	+/−
Centre-left coalition	Democratic Party	8,400,255	27.43	105	—N/a	—N/a	0	281,217	50.60	6	274,732	30.70	4	111	−7
Centre-left coalition	Left Ecology Freedom	912,374	2.97	7	—N/a	—N/a	0	281,217	50.60	6	—N/a	—N/a	0	7	New
Centre-left coalition	The Megaphone	138,581	0.45	1	—N/a	—N/a	0	281,217	50.60	6	—N/a	—N/a	0	1	New
Centre-left coalition	SVP – PATT	—N/a	—N/a	0	—N/a	—N/a	0	281,217	50.60	6	—N/a	—N/a	0	4	±0
Centre-left coalition	Total seats			113			0			6			4	123	-9
Five Star Movement		7,285,850	23.79	54	13,760	20.71	0	82,499	15.14	0	89,562	10.10	0	54	New
Centre-right coalition	The People of Freedom	6,829,373	22.30	98	—N/a	—N/a	0	85,298	15.65	1	136,052	15.20	0	98	−49
Centre-right coalition	Northern League	1,328,555	4.33	17	2,608	3.92	0	85,298	15.65	1	—N/a	—N/a	0	18	−7
Centre-right coalition	Great South	122,100	0.39	1	—N/a	—N/a	0	—N/a	—N/a	0	—N/a	—N/a	0	1	New
Centre-right coalition	Total seats			116			0			1			0	117	-57
With Monti for Italy		2,797,486	9.13	18	1,594	2.39	0	6,646	1.39	0	177,402	19.80	1	19	New
Associative Movement of Italians Abroad		—N/a	—N/a	0	—N/a	—N/a	0	—N/a	—N/a	0	120,290	13.43	1	1	±0
Aosta Valley (UV–SA–FA)		—N/a	—N/a	0	24,609	37.03	1	—N/a	—N/a	0	—N/a	—N/a	0	1	±0
Others		3,936,776	9.21	0	23,868	35.95	0	89,178	17.22	0	150,029	10.77	0	0	—N/a
Total		31,751,350	100	301	66,439	100	1	544,838	100	7	948,067	100	6	315	±0

Popular vote (Party)
PD	27.43%
M5S	23.79%
PdL	22.30%
Monti	9.13%
LN	4.33%
SEL	2.97%
FdI	1.92%
RC	1.79%
Others	6.34%

Popular vote (Coalition)
IBC	31.6%
CDX	30.7%
M5S	23.8%
Monti	9.1%
Others	5.4%

Seat distribution (Coalition)
IBC	39.1%
CDX	37.1%
M5S	17.1%
Monti	6.0%
Others	0.6%

==== Italy (except Aosta Valley and Trentino-Alto Adige) ====
Coalition	Party	Votes	%	Seats
Italy. Common Good	Democratic Party (PD)	8,400,255	27.43	105
Italy. Common Good	Left Ecology Freedom (SEL)	912,374	2.97	7
Italy. Common Good	Democratic Centre (CD)	163,427	0.53	0
Italy. Common Good	The Megaphone (Meg.)	138,581	0.45	1
Italy. Common Good	Italian Socialist Party (PSI)	57,688	0.18	0
Italy. Common Good	Moderates (Mod.)	14,358	0.04	0
Italy. Common Good	Total	9,686,683	31.63	113
Centre-right coalition	The People of Freedom (PdL)	6,829,373	22.30	98
Centre-right coalition	Northern League (LN)	1,328,555	4.33	17
Centre-right coalition	Brothers of Italy (FdI)	590,083	1.92	0
Centre-right coalition	The Right (LD)	221,112	0.72	0
Centre-right coalition	Pensioners' Party (PP)	123,458	0.40	0
Centre-right coalition	Great South (GS)	122,100	0.39	1
Centre-right coalition	Moderates in Revolution (MIR)	69,649	0.22	0
Centre-right coalition	Party of Sicilians–MPA (PdS–MPA)	48,618	0.15	0
Centre-right coalition	Popular Agreement (IP)	24,979	0.08	0
Centre-right coalition	Cantiere Popolare (CP)	21,685	0.07	0
Centre-right coalition	Enough Taxes!	19,298	0.06	0
Centre-right coalition	Free for an Equable Italy (LIE)	6,769	0.02	0
Centre-right coalition	Total	9,405,679	30.71	116
Five Star Movement (M5S)		7,285,850	23.79	54
With Monti for Italy (CMI)		2,797,486	9.13	18
Civil Revolution (RC)		549,987	1.79	0
Act to Stop the Decline (FFD)		278,396	0.90	0
Workers' Communist Party (PCL)		113,935	0.37	0
New Force (FN)		81,519	0.26	0
Amnesty Justice Freedom List (AGL)		63,149	0.20	0
Tricolour Flame (FT)		52,106	0.17	0
I Love Italy (ALI)		40,781	0.13	0
CasaPound (CPI)		40,540	0.13	0
Venetian Independence (IV)		29,696	0.09	0
Venetian Republic League (LVR)		20,381	0.06	0
Ottavio Pasqualucci's coalition	Let's halve the salary for politicians	7,968	0.02	0
Ottavio Pasqualucci's coalition	No to the closure of hospitals	7,547	0.02	0
Ottavio Pasqualucci's coalition	Long Live Italy	4,759	0.01	0
Ottavio Pasqualucci's coalition	Total	20,274	0.06	0
Sardinian Action Party (PSd'Az)		18,602	0.06	0
Rural Civility Development (CRS)		13,945	0.04	0
Stand Up Abruzzo!		11,817	0.03	0
Marxist–Leninist Italian Communist Party (PCIM-L)		9,604	0.03	0
Veneto State (VS)		8,950	0.02	0
Italian Republican Party (PRI)		8,476	0.02	0
Women for Italy		7,610	0.02	0
Independence for Sardinia (IpS)		7,494	0.02	0
Padanian Union (UP)		7,324	0.02	0
United Populars (PU)		6,583	0.02	0
The Pirates		6,265	0.02	0
Italian Reformists (RI)		5,952	0.01	0
Sardinian Rebirth European Movement (MERIS)		5,580	0.01	0
Communist Alternative Party (PdAC)		5,176	0.01	0
Action Party for Development (PAS)		4,522	0.01	0
National Project (PN)		3,822	0.01	0
The Base Sardinia		3,386	0.01	0
All Together for Italy		3,155	0.01	0
Italian Missinian Refoundation (RMI)		2,717	0.00	0
EuWoman Movement		2,689	0.00	0
Building Democracy		2,635	0.00	0
Project Italy Movement (MPI)		1,451	0.00	0
Party of the South (PdS)		1,276	0.00	0
Italian Naturalist Movement (MNI)		1,170	0.00	0
Lucanian Community		882	0.00	0
Invalid/blank votes		1,133,805	–	–
Total		31,751,350	100.00	301
Registered voters/turnout		42,271,967	75.11	–
Source: Ministry of the Interior

==== Aosta Valley ====
The semi-autonomous region of Aosta Valley, in northwestern Italy, elects one member to the Senate through a direct first-past-the-post election. Some parties that formed electoral coalitions in Italy, might have opted to run against one another (or form different coalitions) in this particular region.

Candidate	Party (or a unified coalition list)	Total votes	%	Seats
Albert Lanièce (UV)	Aosta Valley (UV–SA–FA)	24,609	37.03	1
Patrizia Morelli	Autonomy Liberty Democracy (ALD)	20,430	30.75	0
Stefano Ferrero	Five Star Movement (M5S)	13,760	20.71	0
Sandra Maria Cane	Northern League (LN)	2,608	3.92	0
Paolo Dalbard	The Right (LD)	2,014	3.03	0
Luigi Bracci	Union of the Centre (UdC)	1,594	2.39	0
Enrico Martial	Act to Stop the Decline (FFD)	814	1.22	0
Vilma Margaria	CasaPound (CPI)	424	0.63	0
Giovanni Battista Mascia	Nation Val d'Outa	186	0.27	0
Total valid votes	66,439		–	–
Blank/void/unassigned votes	5,280		–	–
Total votes	71,719		100.00	1
Registered voters/turnout	93,040		77.08	–

Source: Ministry of the Interior

==== Trentino-Alto Adige/South Tyrol ====
The semi-autonomous region of Trentino-Alto Adige in north Italy, including South Tyrol, elects seven members to the Senate through its six constituencies. Each constituency elects one senator by first-past-the post, while the seventh seat attributed to the region is filled by the most underrepresented party based on the overall regional result (mixed-member proportional system). Some parties that formed electoral coalitions in Italy, might have opted to run against one another (or form different coalitions) in this particular region.

Party (or a unified coalition list)	Total votes	%	Seats
SVP – PATT – PD – UPT (only Trentino)	127,656	23.43	3
South Tyrolean People's Party (SVP) (only Brixen and Merano constituencies)	97,141	17.82	2
The People of Freedom – Northern League (PdL–LN)	85,298	15.65	1
Five Star Movement (M5S)	82,499	15.14	0
PD – SVP (only Bolzano constituency)	47,623	8.74	1
Die Freiheitlichen (DF) (only South Tyrol)	42,094	7.72	0
Greens (VGV) (only Brixen and Merano constituencies)	12,808	2.34	0
Civil Revolution (RC)	11,262	2.06	0
Democratic Party (PD) (only Brixen and Merano constituencies)	8,797	1.61	0
Act to Stop the Decline (FFD) (only Bolzano constituency and Trentino)	8,796	1.61	0
With Monti for Italy (only Brixen and Merano constituencies)	6,646	1.39	0
Alto Adige in the Heart (AAC)	4,672	0.85	0
Moderates in Revolution (MIR) (only Trentino)	3,414	0.62	0
Brothers of Italy (FdI) (only Bolzano constituency)	3,414	0.62	0
The Right (LD) (only South Tyrol)	1,181	0.21	0
CasaPound (CPI) (only Bolzano constituency)	1,160	0.21	0
Party for All (only Bolzano constituency)	426	0.07	0
Total valid votes	544,838	–	–
Blank/void/unassigned votes	30,437	–	–
Total votes	575,275	100.00	7
Registered voters/turnout	707,666	81.29	–
Source: Ministry of the Interior

==== Overseas constituencies ====
Six members of the Senate are elected by Italians abroad. One member is elected for North America and Central America (including most of the Caribbean), two members for South America (including Trinidad and Tobago), two members for Europe, and one member for the rest of the world (Africa, Asia, Oceania, and Antarctica). Voters in these regions select candidate lists and may also cast a preference vote for individual candidates. The seats are allocated by proportional representation.

The election law allow for parties to form other electoral coalitions on the lists abroad, compared to the lists in Italy. In the 2013 electional list for the Senate all parties were listed independently without any coalitions formed. None of the parties were neither in internal coalitions at the mainland; so in 2013 the electoral situation abroad actually was not different compared to the electoral situation at the mainland.

Party (or a unified coalition list)	Votes	%	Seats
Democratic Party (PD)	274,732	30.7	4 (Note: The 4 senators from Democratic Party were elected by the following regions: Europe (1), North- and Central America (1), South America (1), remaining world (1).)
With Monti for Italy	177,402	19.8	1 (Note: Aldo Di Biagio, The senator from the Monti-coalition (FLI) was elected by the following region: Europe (1).)
The People of Freedom (PdL)	136,052	15.2	0
Associative Movement of Italians Abroad (MAIE)	120,290	13.4	1 (Note: The senator from MAIE was elected by the following region: South America (1).)
Five Star Movement (M5S)	89,562	10.0	0
South American Union of Italian Emigrants (USEI)	38,223	4.3	0
Italians for Freedom	15,260	1.7	0
Civil Revolution (RC)	14,134	1.6	0
Union of Italians for South America	10,881	1.2	0
Act to Stop the Decline (FFD)	7,892	0.9	0
Communist Party (PC)	7,578	0.8	0
Together for the Italians	3,223	0.4	0
Invalid/blank/unassigned votes	108,150	–	–
Total	948,067	100.00	6
Registered voters/turnout	3,149,501	30.1	–
Source: Ministry of the Interior

==== Seats by region ====
Region	Coalitions					Majority bonus winner	Senators
Region					Others	Majority bonus winner	Senators
Lombardy	11 (PD)	16 (PdL); 11 (LN)	7 (M5S)	4 (CMI)		CDX	49
Campania	5 (PD); 1 (SEL)	16 (PdL)	5 (M5S)	2 (CMI)		CDX	29
Lazio	14 (PD); 2 (SEL)	6 (PdL)	6 (M5S)			IBC	28
Sicily	4 (PD); 1 (IM-LC)	14 (PdL)	6 (M5S)			CDX	25
Veneto	4 (PD)	9 (PdL); 5 (LN)	4 (M5S)	2 (CMI)		CDX	24
Piedmont	13 (PD)	3 (PdL); 1 (LN)	3 (M5S)	2 (CMI)		IBC	22
Emilia-Romagna	13 (PD)	4 (PdL)	4 (M5S)	1 (CMI)		IBC	22
Apulia	3 (PD); 1 (SEL)	11 (PdL)	4 (M5S)	1 (CMI)		CDX	20
Tuscany	9 (PD); 1 (SEL)	3 (PdL)	4 (M5S)	1 (CMI)		IBC	18
Calabria	2 (PD)	5 (PdL); 1 (GS)	2 (M5S)			CDX	10
Sardinia	4 (PD); 1 (SEL)	1 (PdL)	2 (M5S)			IBC	8
Liguria	5 (PD)	1 (PdL)	1 (M5S)	1 (CMI)		IBC	8
Marche	5 (PD)	1 (PdL)	1 (M5S)	1 (CMI)		IBC	8
Abruzzo	1 (PD)	4 (PdL)	2 (M5S)			CDX	7
Friuli-Venezia Giulia	4 (PD)	1 (PdL)	1 (M5S)	1 (CMI)		IBC	7
Trentino-Alto Adige/Südtirol	3 (SVP–PATT –PD–UPT); 1 (PD–SVP)	1 (PdL)			2 (SVP)	N/A	7
Umbria	4 (PD)	1 (PdL)	1 (M5S)	1 (CMI)		IBC	7
Basilicata	3 (PD); 1 (SEL)	1 (PdL)	1 (M5S)	1 (CMI)		IBC	7
Molise	1 (PD)	1 (PdL)				N/A	2
Aosta Valley					1 (VA)	N/A	1
Italians abroad	4 (PD)			1 (CMI)	1 (MAIE)	N/A	6
Total	121	117	54	19	4		315

==== Map ====

Seat totals by constituency. As this is a MB election, seat totals are determined by the regional popular vote, benefiting the largest coalition in each region.

== Reactions ==
In most of the rest of Europe, Bersani would have had more than enough support to form a government in his own right, as Italy Common Good won a decisive majority in the Chamber of Deputies. In Italy, unlike in most other parliamentary democracies, the Chamber of Deputies and the Senate have equal power. Governments must thus maintain the confidence of both houses, and require a majority in both houses to pass legislation. As Italy Common Good was 35 seats short of a majority in the Senate, it could not form government on its own. Bersani said that Italy was in a "dramatic situation". Italian and global shares fell as the result became clear, with the value of the euro also dropping. Strong results for anti-austerity parties were interpreted as showing popular opposition to the austerity measures of the Monti government, with the populist Five Star Movement considered to have had a strong election. Analysts were uncertain as to how this new party would behave in the legislature.

On 26 February, La Repubblica ran the headline "Boost for Grillo: Italy ungovernable", whilst Il Giornale described Berlusconi's result as a miracle. Il Messaggero declared: "The winner is ungovernability."

== Government formation ==
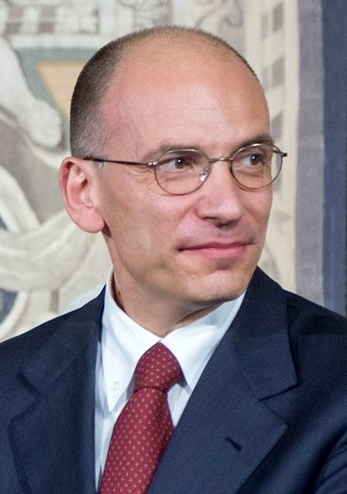
Enrico Letta in 2013

Formal talks to form a new government were expected to start on 10 March with the official confirmation of the results and the convening of the Italian Parliament. The formation task immediately turned out to be tough due to the absence of a clear majority in the Senate, with Giorgio Napolitano being unable to dissolve Parliament due to constitutional constraints forbidding a president from doing so during the last six months of his term.

On 22 March, after the election of house speakers Laura Boldrini and Piero Grasso, and after two days of consultations with all the parliamentary groups, Napolitano designated Pier Luigi Bersani with the task of forming a new government. Bersani immediately ruled out the possibility of a grand coalition with Berlusconi's right-wing coalition, and instead tried to form a minority government supported by the Five Star Movement. On 28 March, after formal talks with Napolitano, Bersani admitted there was no chance to form such a government. Given the troubles in forming a majority coalition, Napolitano then decided to directly form two informal bipartisan commissions with the task of agreeing on a number of shared reforms.

At the same time, a new presidential election was called for 18 April. However, the lack of a clear majority turned out to be problematic also in this scenario, as the first five ballots failed to elect a candidate. The Democratic Party split into several factions due to internal conflicts involving the support of party candidates Franco Marini and Romano Prodi, leading to Bersani's resignation as party leader. On the sixth ballot, in an unprecedented move, Napolitano was elected for a second term as Italian president.

Successively, Napolitano started talks again and on 24 April appointed the Democratic Party's deputy secretary Enrico Letta as designated prime minister on 28 April, he announced that he had managed to form a grand coalition of his Democratic Party, the People of Freedom, Civic Choice, the Union of the Centre and the Radicals that would take office and seek a vote of confidence the next day. The same day as the swearing-in a gunman opened fire at the prime minister's office, Palazzo Chigi, injuring two police officers. Letta told parliament in his inaugural speech "Italy is dying from austerity alone. Growth policies cannot wait." He added that there would not be a property tax imposed and that a "fairer" system for the less affluent was being worked. He also won the vote of confidence by 453 votes to 153.

== Literature ==
- Diamanti, Ilvo (2013). Un salto nel voto: ritratto politico dell'Italia di oggi. Roma: Laterza. ISBN 9788858109090.
- Segatti, Paolo (2014), "The Italian election of February 2013: A temporary shock or a harbinger of a new party system", in Beretta, Silvio; Berkofsky, Axel; Rugge, Fabio (eds.), Italy and Japan: how similar are they?: A comparative analysis of politics, economics, and international relations, Perspectives in Business Culture, Milan: Springer, pp. 121–136, doi:10.1007/978-88-470-2568-4_8, ISBN 9788847025677. Preview of chapter.
- Galasso, Vincenzo; Nannicini, Tommaso (December 2015). "So closed: political selection in proportional systems". European Journal of Political Economy. 40 (B): 260–273. doi:10.1016/j.ejpoleco.2015.04.008. S2CID 55902803. (Uses data from the Italian general election of 2013.)

== See also ==
- Politics of Italy
- History of the Italian Republic#Second Republic (1992–present)
