= European Journal of Political Economy =

- Discipline: Political science
- Language: English

Publication details
- History: 1985–present
- Publisher: Elsevier
- Frequency: Quarterly
- Impact factor: 1.248 (2015)

Standard abbreviations
- ISO 4: Eur. J. Political Econ.

Indexing
- ISSN: 0176-2680 (print); 1873-5703 (web)
- LCCN: 91643586
- OCLC no.: 800544786

Links
- Journal homepage

The European Journal of Political Economy is a quarterly peer-reviewed academic journal covering research on economic phenomena, including collective decision making, political behavior, and the role of institutions.

== Abstracting and indexing ==
The journal is abstracted and indexed in the Social Sciences Citation Index. According to the Journal Citation Reports, the journal has a 2015 impact factor of 1.248, ranking it 50th out of 161 journals in the category "Political Science".
