= Andrea Marcucci =

Italian politician and entrepreneur (born 1965)

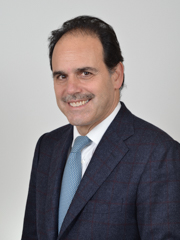

Member of the Senate of the Republic
- In office 29 April 2008 – 13 October 2022

Member of the Chamber of Deputies
- In office 23 April 1992 – 14 April 1994

Personal details
- Born: 28 May 1965 (age 61) Barga, Italy
- Party: PLI (1990–1994); DL (2002–2007); PD (2007–2023); LDE (since 2023)
- Education: University of Pisa
- Occupation: Entrepreneur, politician

Andrea Marcucci (born 28 May 1965) is an Italian politician.

== Biography ==
Marcucci began his political career at the age of 25 in 1990 when he became a provincial councilor of the Province of Lucca with the Italian Liberal Party, with which he is elected deputy in 1992.

In 1994 he returned to entrepreneurial activity and held various positions in companies in the pharmaceutical and tourism sectors owned by his family.

In 2006 he failed the election as senator with The Daisy, but becomes Undersecretary for Cultural Heritage in the Prodi II Cabinet. In 2008 he was elected as senator with the Democratic Party (PD), office he held since then being re-elected in 2013 and 2018.

He was very close to former prime minister Matteo Renzi, he was the PD group leader at the Senate between 2018 and 2021.

Following the election of Elly Schlein as party leader in 2023, Marcucci left the PD and joined the European Liberal Democrats.
