= Il Sole 24 Ore Radiocor =

Italian news agency

Il Sole 24 Ore Radiocor is an Italian business and financial news agency owned by the newspaper Il Sole 24 Ore with five offices in Rome, Milan, Turin, New York City and Brussels.
