= Il Sole 24 Ore =

Italian financial daily newspaper

- Front page, 22 October 2022
- Type: Daily newspaper
- Format: Broadsheet
- Owner: Confindustria
- Founder(s): Ferdinando di Fenizio; Libero Lenti; Roberto Tremelloni
- Editor-in-chief: Fabio Tamburini
- Founded: 9 November 1965; 60 years ago
- Political alignment: Liberalism
- Language: Italian
- Headquarters: Milan, Italy
- Circulation: 177,000 (2017)
- ISSN: 0391-786X
- Website: www.ilsole24ore.com

Il Sole 24 Ore (Italian: [il ˈsoːle ˌventiˈkwattro ˈoːre]; English: "The Sun 24 Hours") is the Italian financial newspaper of record, owned by Confindustria, the Italian employers' federation. Il Sole 24 Ore is the leading financial daily in Italy.

== History and profile ==
Il Sole 24 Ore was first published on 9 November 1965 as a merger between Il Sole ("The Sun"), founded in 1865, and 24 Ore ("24 Hours"), founded in 1933. The latter was established by young economists, including Ferdinando di Fenizio, Libero Lenti and Roberto Tremelloni, on 15 February 1933. The owner of Il Sole 24 Ore is Confindustria.

In 2006, it was reported that Il Sole 24 Ore had Europe's highest circulation for a financial daily.

Il Sole 24 Ore has its headquarters in Milan, more precisely in Sarca Avenue 223, and is published in broadsheet format. The paper reports on business, politics, developments in commercial and labour law, corporate news and features. Extensive share and financial product listings are provided in its daily supplement, Finanza e Mercati.

Weekly supplements include:

- Domenica (Sunday): art, literature, philosophy, theatre, cinema, book reviews, and related news;
- Plus24 (Saturday): family savings, market analysis, real estate market news, and other private investment topics;
- Nòva 24 (Sunday): science and technology.

Irregular supplements are also produced with a focus on a specific issue such as a particular business sector.

== Circulation ==
The 1988 circulation of Il Sole 24 Ore was 320,000 copies. In 1997 it was the fifth best-selling Italian newspaper with a circulation of 368,652 copies.

The paper sold 520,000 copies in 2000 and 414,000 copies in 2001. In 2004 the paper had a circulation of 373,723 copies, making it the fourth best-selling newspaper in Italy. Its circulation was 334,076 copies in 2008. The print and digital circulation in 2017 was nearly 177,000 copies. In the course of 2017, its circulation increased again in the ranking of national newspapers with the highest diffusion from fourth to third place. (Source Budget 2017)

== The information integrated system ==
Front page of Il Sole 24 Ore for 12 September 2001

The printed newspaper is presented as part of an integrated information system which includes:

- Radio 24: a news/talk FM/online radio channel;
- Il Sole 24 Ore Radiocor: business and financial news agency;
- 24 Minuti: a defunct free daily newspaper;
- ilsole24ore.com: the online newspaper;
- 24ore.tv: a defunct financial all-news TV channel replaced in 2025 by Radio24-IlSole24OreTV channel

== Professional services ==
Il Sole 24 Ore is published by 24 ORE Group. The group has been listed on the Italian Stock Exchange since 6 December 2007.

== Directors ==
- Mauro Masone (9 November 1965 - 2 January 1969)
- Alberto Mucci (3 January 1969 - 5 June 1978)
- Fabio Luca Cavazza Rossi (6 June 1978 - 30 September 1980)
- Mario Deaglio (1 October 1980 - 14 May 1983)
- Gianni Locatelli (15 May 1983 - 31 July 1993)
- Salvatore Carrubba (1 August 1993 - 31 December 1996)
- Ernesto Auci (1 January 1997 - 8 July 2001)
- Guido Gentili (9 July 2001 - 10 January 2005)
- Ferruccio de Bortoli (11 January 2005 - 8 April 2009)
- Gianni Riotta (9 April 2009 - 15 March 2011)
- Roberto Napoletano (23 March 2011 - 13 March 2017)
- Guido Gentili, interim (from 14 March to 9 August 2017)
- Guido Gentili, 2nd time (from 10 August 2017 to 11 September 2018)
- Fabio Tamburini (from 12 September 2018)

== Annual publications ==
Every year it publishes the Urban Ecosystem report, edited by Legambiente and Ambiente Italia. The report evaluates 105 Italian provinces in 5 macro areas: air, water, waste, mobility and environment. More specifically, it also publishes a list of the 107 Italian province with the best quality of life (which is evaluated through a panel of 90 indicators).

== See also ==
- List of newspapers in Italy
