= Oscar Giannino =

Italian journalist and politician (born 1961)

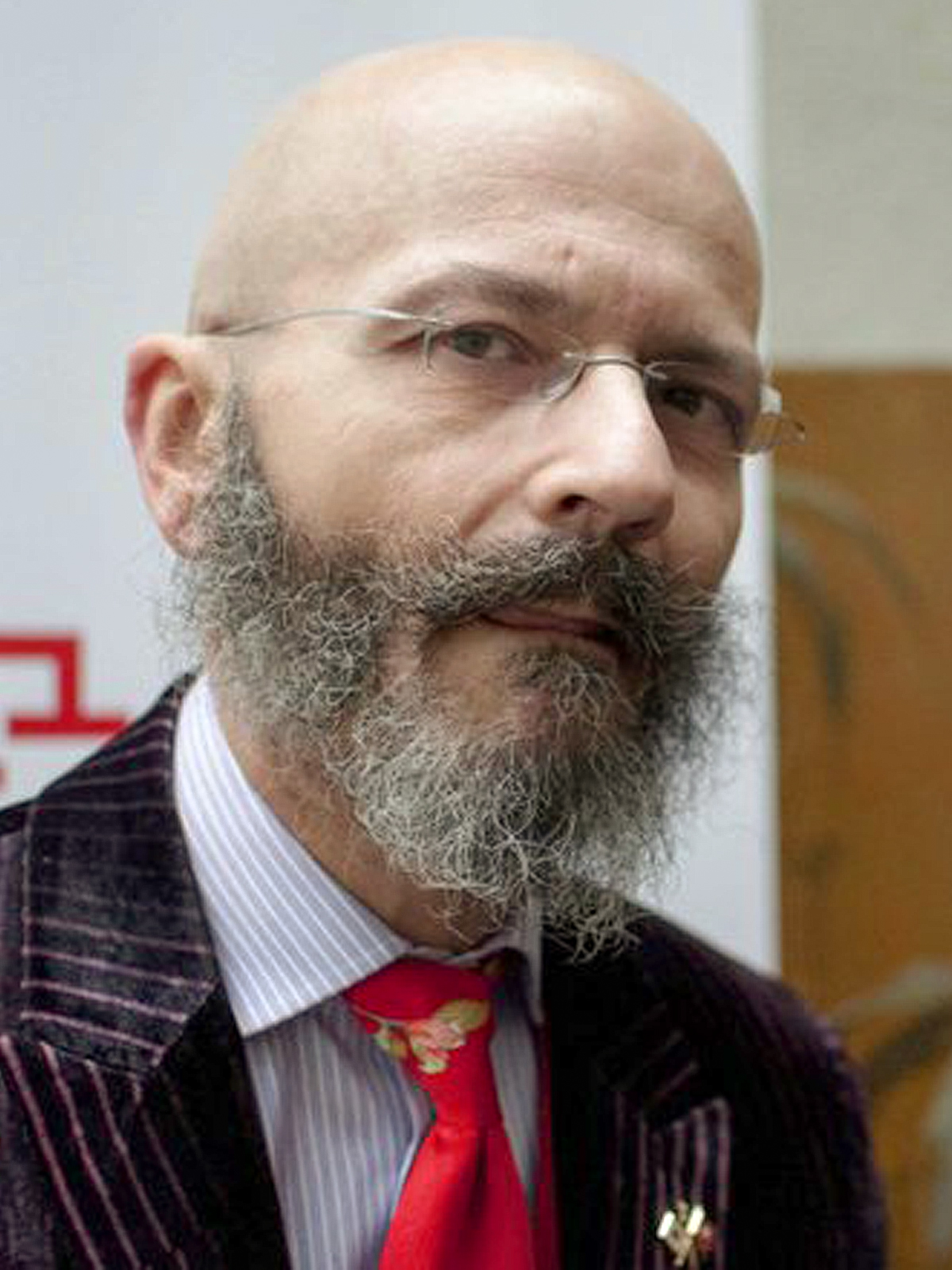

President of Stop the Decline
- In office 28 July 2012 – 20 February 2013
- Preceded by: Office created
- Succeeded by: Silvia Enrico

Personal details
- Born: Oscar Fulvio Giannino; 1 September 1961 (age 64) Turin, Italy
- Party: ALI (since 2013)
- Other political affiliations: PRI (1987–1994); RL (2005–2009); FiD (2012–2013)
- Profession: Journalist, politician

Oscar Fulvio Giannino (born 1 September 1961) is an Italian journalist and politician. A member of the Liberal Democratic Alliance for Italy (Italian: Alleanza Liberaldemocratica per l'Italia, ALI) since 2013, he is the former president of the free-market-oriented Stop the Decline (Italian: Fermare il Declino, FiD) party.

== Biography ==
Giannino was born in Turin, the capital city of the Italian region of Piedmont. He soon started his career as journalist. In 1984, he became a member of the national leadership of the Italian Republican Party (Italian: Partito Repubblicano Italiano, PRI). He was the national secretary (Italian: segretario nazionale) of the party's youth wing from 1984 to 1987, and was the party's spokesperson (Italian: portavoce) from 1987 to 1994. From 2005 to 2009, he was a member of the Liberal Reformers (Italian: Riformatori Liberali, RL). In March 2012, he was a speaker at the national congress of the Grand Orient of Italy in Rimini.

In August 2012, Giannino founded the Stop the Decline party, and in December he announced that he would run to become Prime Minister of Italy (Italian: presidente del Consiglio dei ministri) for the 2013 Italian general election. He stepped down from FiD's presidency (Italian: capo della forza politica) after it was discovered that he had fabricated his résumé by adding false academic claims, such as a law degree in Italy and a master's degree in corporate finance and public finance at the University of Chicago Booth School of Business. The deception was discovered by the party co-founder and Giannino's colleague, Luigi Zingales, who was professor at the Booth School of Business and left the political association.

Party political offices
Preceded by new party	President of Stop the Decline; 28 July 2012 – 20 February 2013	Succeeded by Silvia Enrico
Preceded by new party	Stop the Decline nominee (capo della forza politica) for the office of Prime Minister of Italy; Italian general election, 24 and 25 February 2013	Most recent
