= Act to Stop the Decline =

Act to Stop the Decline Fare per Fermare il Declino
- Coordinator: Oscar Giannino (2012–13); Michele Boldrin (2013–14)
- Founded: 16 August 2012
- Dissolved: 2014
- Headquarters: Via Caradosso, 17 Milan
- Membership (2014): 72,583
- Ideology: Classical liberalism Economic liberalism
- Political position: Centre-right
- National affiliation: European Choice (2014)
- Colours: Red

Act to Stop the Decline (Italian: Fare per Fermare il Declino, Fare or FFD) was a liberal political party in Italy, founded in 2012 as Stop the Decline (Fermare il Declino, FiD). Oscar Giannino and Michele Boldrin have been its main leaders.

== History ==
FFD was launched in July 2012 as a spinoff of a cultural movement, "Fermare il Declino" initiated by a group of seven economists with an open letter published in Italy's major newspapers: Oscar Giannino, Michele Boldrin, Sandro Brusco, Alessandro De Nicola, Andrea Moro, Carlo Stagnaro and Luigi Zingales. The manifesto of the association was signed by 240 personalities and, as of May 2013, had attracted more than 70,000 signatures.

The core goals of FFD included the reduction of the national debt by 20% of GDP in 5 years, the reduction of the public expenditure by at least 6% of GDP in 5 years, the reduction of the tax burden on citizens by at least 5% in 5 years, the introduction of a serious federalism, university reform, liberalizations and privatizations.

On 8 December 2012 it was announced that the association would run an electoral list in the 2013 general election. In the election, held in February 2013, the party obtained 1.2%, returning no seats. Luigi Zingales left the party that same month.

FFD contested the 2014 European election within the European Choice (SE) electoral list alongside Civic Choice, Democratic Centre and other minor parties. The list received just 0.7% of the vote and failed to elect any MEPs. Boldrin publicly expressed his regret about the decision to take part in SE and criticized its coalition partners and Guy Verhofstadt.

The party has since been almost inactive and lost media attention and notability. In late 2015 the official website was no longer active.

== Electoral results ==
=== Italian Parliament ===
Chamber of Deputies
Election year	# of overall votes	% of overall vote	# of overall seats won	+/–	Leader
2013	380,937 (#10)	1.2	0 / 630	–	Oscar Giannino

Senate of the Republic
Election year	# of overall votes	% of overall vote	# of overall seats won	+/–	Leader
2013	278,396 (#9)	0.9	0 / 315	–	Oscar Giannino

=== European Parliament ===
Election year	# of overall votes	% of overall vote	# of overall seats won	+/–	Leader
2014	197,942 (#9)	0.7	0 / 73	–	Michele Boldrin

== Leadership ==
- President/Coordinator: Oscar Giannino (2012–2013), Silvia Enrico (acting, 2013), Michele Boldrin (2013–2014)
- President of the National Assembly: Santo Versace (2014)
