= Hands Off Cain =

Italian international organization against the death penalty

- Nessuno tocchi Caino
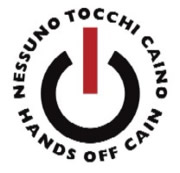
- Official logo
- Abbreviation: NTC
- Formation: December 9, 1993; 32 years ago
- Founders: Mariateresa Di Lascia, Sergio D'Elia, Marco Pannella, Emma Bonino
- Type: Non-governmental organization
- Purpose: Abolition of the death penalty; universal moratorium on executions; prisoners' rights
- Headquarters: Rome, Italy
- Region served: Worldwide
- Members: c. 3,000 (2024)
- Official languages: Italian, English
- President: Rita Bernardini
- Secretary: Sergio D'Elia
- Treasurer: Elisabetta Zamparutti
- Affiliations: Nonviolent Radical Party, Transnational and Transparty; World Coalition Against the Death Penalty
- Website: www.nessunotocchicaino.it

Hands Off Cain (Italian: Nessuno tocchi Caino) is an international league of citizens and parliamentarians for the abolition of the death penalty worldwide. Founded in Brussels in 1993 by members of the Radical Party, it is a non-profit, nonviolent non-governmental organization based in Rome. It is regarded as one of the main promoters of the campaign that led, on 18 December 2007, to the adoption by the United Nations General Assembly of the first resolution for a universal moratorium on executions (Resolution 62/149), a resolution since reaffirmed and strengthened every two years. Over the years it has extended its field of action to prison conditions, the campaign against life imprisonment without parole (ergastolo ostativo) and the Article 41-bis regime in Italy, and to torture and inhuman or degrading treatment generally. In 2005 it was recognized by the Italian Ministry of Foreign Affairs as a development cooperation NGO.

== Name ==
The name is drawn from the Book of Genesis (4:15). After Cain killed his brother Abel, God did not put him to death but marked him so that no one would harm him: "And the Lord set a mark upon Cain, lest any finding him should kill him". In the organization's reading, the mark of Cain is the first act by which the law removes the guilty from vengeance — hence its motto, "justice without vengeance".

== History ==
=== Foundation (1993) ===
Hands Off Cain was founded in Brussels, where on 9–10 December 1993 the founding congress of the "International league for the abolition of the death penalty by the year 2000" was held, on the initiative of the Radical parliamentarians Mariateresa Di Lascia and Sergio D'Elia, with the support of Marco Pannella and Emma Bonino. D'Elia, a former leader of the far-left armed organization Prima Linea who was convicted for terrorism offences and later became a nonviolent human rights activist, has served as the organization's secretary since its foundation. Di Lascia died prematurely in September 1994; the organization dedicated its thirtieth-anniversary congress (2023) to her memory.

=== After Pannella ===
Marco Pannella, who was for many years the organization's president, died on 19 May 2016; the presidency was assumed by Rita Bernardini, a historic Radical leader and former member of parliament. Under her presidency the organization, while maintaining its international campaign against the death penalty, has intensified its campaigns on the Italian prison system.

== Campaign for a UN moratorium ==
=== Origins (1994–2006) ===
Unlike organizations pursuing abolition as an immediate demand, Hands Off Cain adopted from the outset a distinctive gradualist strategy: a universal moratorium on executions, adopted by the UN General Assembly, as the political meeting point between abolitionist and retentionist states. In the organization's analysis, a state that suspends executions for several years rarely resumes them, so a moratorium in practice paves the way to abolition in law.

At the initiative of Hands Off Cain and the Transnational Radical Party, the Italian government presented the first draft resolution for a moratorium on executions to the UN General Assembly in 1994; it was defeated by eight votes. The campaign continued at the United Nations Commission on Human Rights in Geneva, which — on Italy's initiative from 1997 and through the European Union's endeavour from 1999 — adopted pro-moratorium resolutions annually, while the organization lobbied governments to bring the question back to the General Assembly in New York.

=== The 2007 resolution ===
On 18 December 2007, the UN General Assembly adopted Resolution 62/149, "Moratorium on the use of the death penalty", presented by the European Union at Italy's instigation, with 104 votes in favour, 54 against and 29 abstentions. The resolution, the first of its kind ever adopted by the General Assembly, called on all states that still maintain the death penalty to establish a moratorium on executions with a view to abolition. It is widely recognized as the outcome of the campaign launched in Italy by Hands Off Cain and the Radicals.

=== Subsequent resolutions (2008–2024) ===
The General Assembly has since renewed and reinforced the moratorium resolution every two years, with support growing at nearly every vote. The tenth resolution, co-facilitated by Argentina and Italy on behalf of an inter-regional task force and co-sponsored by 70 states, was adopted on 17 December 2024 with a record 130 votes in favour, 32 against and 22 abstentions, more than two thirds of the UN membership. States that had previously voted against or abstained — including Antigua and Barbuda, Burundi, Gabon, Kenya, Morocco and Zambia — voted in favour for the first time. Hands Off Cain conducts missions and parliamentary initiatives in the run-up to every biennial resolution to persuade retentionist states to move from opposition to abstention, and from abstention to support.

Beyond the biennial votes, the organization advocates strengthening the content of the resolution: it calls for the abolition of "state secrets" surrounding the death penalty — since many retentionist countries release no information on its application — and has asked the UN Secretary-General to appoint a Special Envoy on the death penalty, tasked with monitoring the use of capital punishment, demanding greater transparency and persuading retentionist states to implement the moratorium line established by the United Nations.

== International activities ==
=== Annual report ===
Since the late 1990s Hands Off Cain has published The Death Penalty Worldwide (Italian: La pena di morte nel mondo), an annual report giving a country-by-country overview of executions, death sentences, and political and juridical developments concerning capital punishment, drawing on a daily updated database and complemented by an electronic newsletter. The report, originally published by Marsilio and edited by Elisabetta Zamparutti, is published in both Italian and English and presented each year in Rome. According to the organization, the overwhelming majority of executions worldwide take place in authoritarian or illiberal states, which leads it to frame the death penalty as an issue of democracy and the rule of law rather than of criminal justice alone.

=== The Abolitionist of the Year Award ===
The annual report is dedicated each year to the person who has demonstrated an extraordinary commitment in the struggle for a moratorium on executions and the abolition of the death penalty, and who receives the "Abolitionist of the Year" award at a ceremony in Rome. Recipients have included Rwandan President Paul Kagame (2007), following Rwanda's abolition of the death penalty.

=== Parliamentary diplomacy and missions ===
A hallmark of Hands Off Cain's method is direct engagement with governments and parliaments of retentionist states. The organization promotes international appeals and mobilizations for individual death-row prisoners — as in the case of political prisoners sentenced to death in Iran in 2024 — and conducts missions to governments and international bodies, in Geneva, New York, Tokyo and the capitals of retentionist countries, to support national moratoriums and abolitions. With the campaign "State of emergency? Rule of Law!" it works to contain the use of the death penalty in the context of the fight against terrorism, and it has conducted European Union–supported training and information projects in Egypt, Somalia and Tunisia on the instruments of international law that restrict capital punishment in that context. Since the 2007 UN vote the organization has focused especially on Africa, where Rwanda, Burundi, Gabon, Togo, Benin and Guinea abolished the death penalty in the following years; the abolitionist trend on the continent has continued with, among others, Chad (2020), Sierra Leone (2021), the Central African Republic and Zambia (2022) and Ghana (2023), and by 2024 half of the countries of the continent had abolished the death penalty.

Hands Off Cain is a member of the World Coalition Against the Death Penalty.

=== The Colosseum as abolitionist symbol ===
In December 1999 the city of Rome launched the initiative "The Colosseum Illuminates Life", under which the Colosseum — once a place of capital executions — is specially illuminated for 48 hours whenever a death sentence is halted or commuted, or capital punishment is abolished anywhere in the world. The monument has since become a worldwide visual symbol of the abolitionist movement to which Hands Off Cain's campaign belongs, and has been lit to mark, among other occasions, the abolition of the death penalty in individual US states.

== Campaigns in Italy ==
=== "Spes contra Spem" and prison conditions ===
In 2011 the organization began a systematic programme of visits to Italian prisons, from which grew the campaign "Morte per pena" ("Death by punishment") against deaths in custody and conditions of detention contrary to the sense of humanity. Since 2016 it has held monthly "Spes contra Spem" workshops — named after the motto with which Pannella urged life prisoners to "be hope" — in the Opera prison in Milan and other institutions, bringing together prisoners (including those under ergastolo ostativo and Article 41-bis regimes), prison staff, jurists and civil society; the organization has held several of its congresses inside the Opera prison, including its tenth congress in December 2023, marking its thirtieth anniversary.

=== Life imprisonment without parole ===
Hands Off Cain has been among the leading campaigners, in the courts and in politics, against ergastolo ostativo, the Italian "never-ending sentence" that excludes non-cooperating convicts from parole and prison benefits. In 2019 the European Court of Human Rights, in Viola v. Italy (no. 2), found the regime incompatible with Article 3 of the European Convention on Human Rights, and the Italian Constitutional Court, with judgment 253/2019, struck down the absolute presumption of dangerousness that barred non-cooperating prisoners from temporary release permits. The organization also campaigns, with "Quando prevenire è peggio che punire" ("When prevention is worse than punishment", 2018), against Italian preventive measures applied without conviction, such as pre-trial asset seizures and anti-mafia interdictions.

== Organization ==
Since 2017 the organization has added the phrase "Spes contra Spem" to its name, and it now styles itself a "Transnational Transparty Nonviolent Radical Association". It counts around three thousand members.

The president is Rita Bernardini, a historic Radical activist, former deputy vice-director of Radio Radicale, member of parliament and secretary of Italian Radicals, active in the organization since 1993 and known for her hunger strikes for prisoners' rights. The secretary is co-founder Sergio D'Elia, a former member of parliament and secretary of the bureau of the Chamber of Deputies in the 15th legislature. The treasurer is Elisabetta Zamparutti, a former Radical member of parliament, editor of the annual report and Italian member of the Council of Europe's Committee for the Prevention of Torture (CPT). Honorary presidents are Santi Consolo, former head of the Italian penitentiary administration, the jurists Tullio Padovani and Vincenzo Maiello, and the lawyer Andrea Saccucci; fundraising is handled by the entrepreneur Alberto Genovese.

The steering committee comprises about one hundred members, including politicians such as Gianni Alemanno, Roberto Giachetti, Renata Polverini and Roberto Rampi; jurists and lawyers including the constitutionalist Andrea Pugiotto and Maria Brucale; journalists and public figures such as Tiziana Maiolo and Simona Ventura; the Jesuit Guido Bertagna, a leading figure in restorative justice in Italy; and former members of armed organizations turned nonviolent activists, such as Francesca Mambro, as well as prisoners and former prisoners engaged in the organization's programmes.

== Relations with Amnesty International ==
In 2003 a public controversy arose between Hands Off Cain and the Italian section of Amnesty International. Sergio D'Elia, echoing earlier criticisms by Marco Pannella, accused Amnesty of failing to support the campaign for a UN moratorium resolution, favouring instead a purely abolitionist line. Amnesty International replied that it supported a moratorium as a first step towards abolition but that its statutes required strict independence from political parties. The polemic resurfaced in January 2007, in the months preceding the first General Assembly resolution, when Hands Off Cain again called on Amnesty to back the moratorium initiative.

== In popular culture ==
Enrico Ruggeri and Andrea Mirò performed the song "Nessuno tocchi Caino", written to promote the organization, at the Sanremo Music Festival 2003, where it finished fourth; the music video was directed by Oliviero Toscani.

In 2016 the director Ambrogio Crespi presented at the 73rd Venice International Film Festival the documentary Spes contra Spem – Liberi dentro, filmed in the Opera prison with prisoners serving ergastolo ostativo sentences and born of the organization's prison workshops.

== See also ==
- Capital punishment
- United Nations moratorium on the death penalty
- Transnational Radical Party
- World Coalition Against the Death Penalty
- Life imprisonment in Italy
