= Daniele Capezzone =

Italian journalist and ex politician

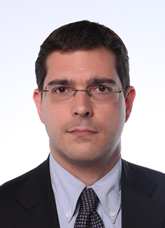

Member of the Italian Chamber of Deputies
- In office 28 April 2006 – 28 April 2008
- Constituency: Sicily
- In office 15 March 2013 – 22 March 2018
- Constituency: Piedmont

Personal details
- Born: 8 September 1972 (age 53) Rome, Italy
- Party: Direction Italy (2017–2018); Conservative and Reformists (2015–2017); Forza Italia (2013–2015); The People of Freedom (2009–2013); Forza Italia (2008–2009); Italian Radicals (2001–2007)
- Occupation: Journalist
- Profession: Politician, Journalist

Daniele Capezzone (born 8 September 1972) is an Italian journalist and former politician.

From 14 July 2001 to 4 November 2006, he was secretary of the Italian Radicals, a liberal, pro-market economy, libertarian movement associated with the Transnational Radical Party. He has been one of the youngest party-secretaries in Italy so far.

In 2006-2008, he was the President of the 10th Permanent Commission (Productive Affairs, Trade and Tourism) of the Italian Chamber of Deputies.

== Biography ==
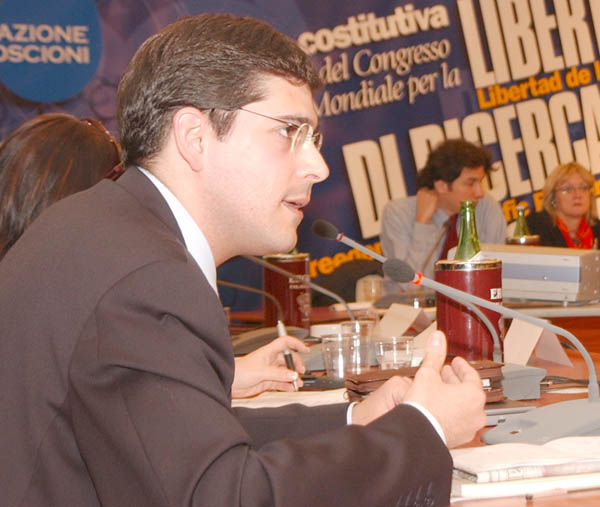
Capezzone as Secretary of Italian Radicals.

Graduated at "Lucio Manara" Secondary School in Classical Studies in Rome, he attended Law Faculty at LUISS "Guido Carli" University until 1997. On 1 January 1998, he attended a Radical Party demonstration, where he first met the radical leader Marco Pannella. He then dropped the studies and became a political activist. On 14 July 2001, he was elected Secretary of the newly-born party of the Italian Radicals.

In 2003, he published his first book, A radical shock for 21st Century, a synthesis of the Radicals' proposals for the constitution of a "World Democracy Organization". The contents of the book were presented at the Washington D.C. American Enterprise Institute in March 2004.

In 2004 Capezzone published his second book, Euroghost - Un fantasma si aggira per l'Europa: l'Europa (English translation: Euroghost - A Ghost wanders through Europe: Europe itself); he undertook a 54-day-long hunger strike (with the Italian Radicals Treasurer, Rita Bernardini, and the death-penalty abolitionist organization Hands Off Cain President, Sergio D'Elia), asking the Italian Parliament to pass a general pardon-law; he wrote some op-ed articles for the Italian right-wing newspaper Libero and for The Washington Times.

Capezzone became a well-known politician also for his appearances in the satirical TV show Markette (on private TV-channel La7) and for his caricature-imitation made by Italian comedian Neri Marcorè in another satirical TV show, Superciro (on private TV-channel Italia 1).

During Spring 2005, he undertook another hunger strike (once more with Rita Bernardini) asking to the Italian public service broadcaster RAI to give more space to the debates on the Radical referendum proposals for partially abrogate the law on artificial insemination, particularly strict in Italy. The four proposals, held on 12 and 13 June 2005, were however invalidated due to high abstentionism.

In November 2005, Capezzone was re-confirmed as Italian Radicals' Secretary for the fourth time in a row and he conducted the birth of the Rose in the Fist, a libertarian-socialist federation with the Italian Democratic Socialists (SDI). He was elected in the general election of 2006 as a member of the Chamber of Deputies and, on 6 June 2006, as President of the 10th Permanent Commission, becoming the first radical politician to be elected as a President of a Permanent Commission in the Italian Parliament.

During the 5th Congress of the Italian Radicals (held in Padua, 2–5 November 2006), Capezzone has been harshly challenged by many Radical leaders, because of his criticism to the Prodi II Cabinet (mostly stigmatized from Minister of European Politics and International Trade, Emma Bonino) and for an alleged personalistic management of the movement, which allegedly caused a worsening of the economical condition of the party.

In the previous days, newspapers reported rumours about the likelihood of his substitution at the party Secretariat, in favour of the Treasurer Rita Bernardini. The Radicals historical leader Marco Pannella justified that substitution not as "an act of disconfidence" on Capezzone, but as the prosecution of a historical custom of no overlapping of party- and parliamentarian-appointments.

Newspapers however insisted on a break-up between Pannella and Capezzone (shown respectively as "the past" and "the future" of the Radical movement), re-publishing an audio/video recording (already published by Radio Radicale's website) of a very lively discussion between the two politicians, during the Italian Radicals' National Direction meeting held on 26 October 2006. Also in October, Capezzone came out as bisexual He will later in other interview insist his sexual life is private.

After an even more lively Italian Radicals' National Direction meeting held on the night of 4 November 2006, during the 5th Congress of the movement, Capezzone accepted not to offer himself for the fifth time in a row for the Secretariat and to support instead the candidature of the Treasurer Rita Bernardini. The 5th Congress accepted anyway his proposal of General Motion (co-signed with Bernardini), that committed the Italian Radicals to relaunch the Rose in the Fist alliance and to press the Prodi II Cabinet for embark new libertarian proposals on economy and civil rights.

From that time, anyway, Capezzone started to distance himself from his party and to be very critical with Prodi II Cabinet, which he says not to support anymore. In June 2007, despite not having left the Radicals yet, he launched his own political association, Decide!, mounting rumors that he was heading towards the centre-right House of Freedoms coalition. On 7 November Capezzone finally left the Italian Radicals and the Rose in the Fist.

He has been the spokesman of Forza Italia and then of The People of Freedom.
