= Alberto Maria Genovese =

Italian businessman (born 1977)

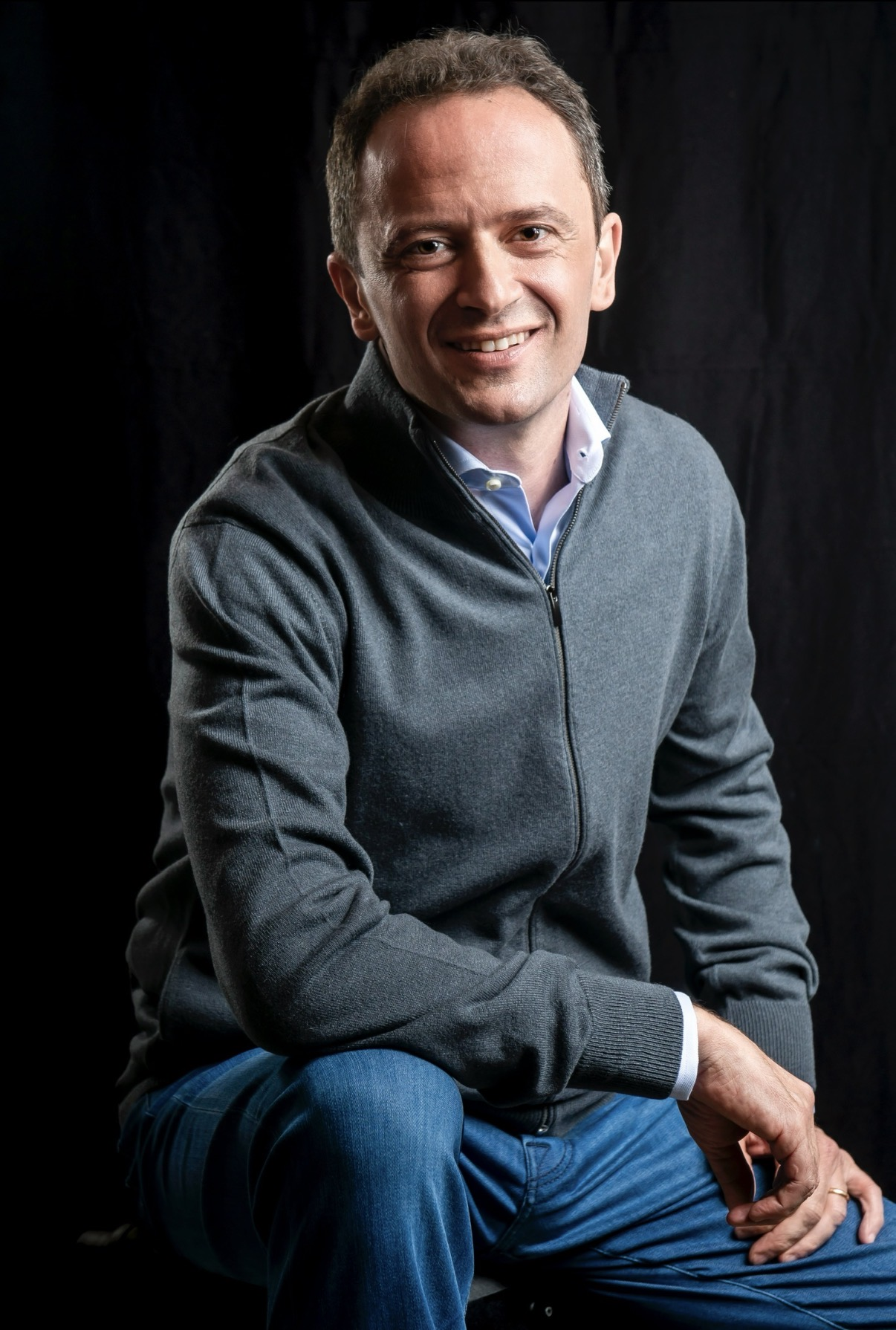
- Born: 28 May 1977 (age 49); Naples, Italy
- Education: Bocconi University (BBA); INSEAD (MBA); Harvard Business School (ExEd)
- Occupation: Entrepreneur
- Known for: Founder of Facile.it and Prima Assicurazioni
- Criminal charges: Sexual assault and drug trafficking, tax evasion
- Relatives: Laura Genovese (sister)
- Website: https://lauraealbertogenovese.org

Alberto Maria Genovese (born 28 May 1977) is an Italian entrepreneur, known for his successful start-ups and ventures in the tech sector. He is the founder and former chairman of Facile.it, a price-comparison platform with 70 branches, and of Prima Assicurazioni, a digital insurance company active in Italy, Spain, and the United Kingdom. Both companies have achieved unicorn status. Following his convictions for sexual assault, that were also the subject of a Netflix docu-series, Genovese became involved in drug rehabilitation and volunteering initiatives, including activities supporting people affected by drug addiction and prisoners' social reintegration.

== Early life and education ==
Genovese was born in Naples on 28 May 1977 into a middle-class family. Both of his parents were doctors, while his sister is a lawyer. Genovese's family stayed in Naples while he moved in Milan to study. After graduating with honours in Business Administration from Bocconi University in Milan, Genovese obtained an MBA at INSEAD in Fontainebleau and attended executive-education programmes at Harvard Business School in Boston.

== Career ==
=== Goldman Sachs and eBay ===
In 1999, Genovese began his professional career in the Goldman Sachs equities division in London, before working as a strategic consultant for McKinsey & Company and subsequently Bain & Company. From 2005 to 2009, he worked for eBay as the head of its Motors and New Businesses division, an experience that strengthened his interest in technology.

=== Facile.it ===
In 2008, Genovese founded Facile.it (initially named Assicurazione.it), a comparison website for insurance and financial products, and was its chairman and chief executive officer. According to Genovese, the idea originated from a conversation with his future business partner about the difficulty of finding the most convenient car-insurance policy online. Also in 2008, he and his future partner began developing in their spare time a software that collected prices from insurance companies' websites and compared them.

By 2010, Genovese had left his position at eBay to devote himself full-time to the company, which was relaunched under the Facile.it name in April 2011. Under his leadership, Facile.it reached 350 employees. In 2011, Luigi, Eleonora, and Barbara Berlusconi invested in the company through their società a responsabilità limitata, Holding Italiana Quattordicesima, which held 20.39% of Facile.it at the end of 2013. In the first half of 2014, Facile.it's revenues rose by 28% and its EBITDA by 108%. By September it had more than 1.5 million monthly users and no bank debt. In September 2014, Oakley Capital Investments acquired 75% of Facile.it in a transaction valuing the company at more than €100 million; Mauro Giacobbe took over as CEO shortly thereafter.

In May 2018, EQT agreed to acquire Facile.it from Oakley Capital and other shareholders, with Oakley reinvesting for a minority stake; the price was not disclosed. At the time Facile.it reported 2017 revenues of about €66 million, average annual revenue growth of 21% over the previous five years, about 20 million users, and comparison services drawn from around 80 suppliers. In June 2022, the US fund Silver Lake agreed to acquire Facile.it from EQT and Oakley. The price was undisclosed, but was reported at about €1 billion. The company had revenues of about €140 million for 2021, more than four million monthly users, 39 stores, and a network of more than 3,000 agents. By 2025, Facile.it had expanded its physical retail network to 70 stores across Italy.

After the sale Genovese remained a shareholder in Facile.it with a small stake and turned to Prima Assicurazioni. He later sat on the advisory board of the Luxembourg-based EQT VIII fund, through which EQT took control of Facile.it in 2018; the board had an essentially consultative role and was chaired by Gianandrea de Bernardis.

=== Prima Assicurazioni ===
In 2014, Genovese founded Prima Assicurazioni, a tech company operating as an insurance agency, and became its chairman and CEO. In 2020, Prima Assicurazioni operated as a technology-based agency registered as an intermediary, which designed, priced, and distributed motor, motorcycle, and van liability policies underwritten by other insurers, including Great Lakes Insurance and La Parisienne Assurances, and managed customer service and claims itself. Genovese's strategy was to apply digital technology to established industries whose incumbent companies he considered insufficiently innovative; in the Italian motor market he saw about 40 million vehicles of which only four million were insured online. According to retrospectives, Prima Assicurazioni had exceeded three million customers within three years of its launch. In October 2018, Prima Assicurazioni closed the largest venture capital financing round in Italy: a €100 million increase, with Goldman Sachs and Blackstone Group as subscribers, in what was reported as one of the largest investments in the Italian startup sector for the year. In 2019, premiums rose from €77 million to more than €131 million and the company established partnerships with companies including Telepass and Conad. At the beginning of 2020, Prima Assicurazioni had about 537,000 customers, more than 600,000 policies, and nearly 180 employees, having moved to new offices in central Milan; about 40% of its customers came directly to its website rather than through comparison sites, and it was targeting more than one million customers during the year, preparing a home-insurance product, and opening a channel of physical agents and brokers, with plans to consider other markets from 2021.

In 2020, the year in which Genovese was removed from his positions at the company in November, Prima Assicurazioni had 1.1 million active customers, nearly €290 million in premiums, more than 5,000 customers each month for its claims service, and 339 staff members with an average age of 31. In November 2020, Genovese sold the final tranche of his stake in Prima Assicurazioni in a deal valued at €897 million. In 2022, Genovese sold his remaining 25% stake in Prima Assicurazioni for €200 million, bringing its valuation closer to €1 billion. In 2025, following Axa's acquisition of a 51% stake in Prima Assicurazioni, Genovese received an €89.7 million earn-out connected to his 2022 exit from the company; he had already disposed of his entire shareholding in 2022 and no longer held any corporate position at Prima Assicurazioni.

=== Other ventures ===
In 2010, Genovese launched Seguros.es, the Spanish version of the online insurance comparison site, which was then sold to the Rastreator group in 2014. After the sale of Facile.it, Genovese continued to pursue new ventures rather than leaving the tech sector. In 2015, Genovese founded Brumbrum.it, an online used car retailer in Italy, closing a €10 million investment round from United Ventures and selling it to a partner in 2019. Unlike a conventional intermediary, the company purchased cars directly and then resold them after preparing them for the market. He described the model as applying the same strategy he had used with Prima Assicurazioni: entering large industries whose established players had failed to keep pace with technological change. In 2019, Brumbrum.it received investment from Accel, which had previously invested in start-ups including Spotify and Deliveroo. Genovese served as Brumbrum's chairman until January 2019; according to the company, he had no operational role or delegated powers. In 2020, Zappyrent, a start-up focused on simplifying the medium- and long-term rental market, raised €2.5 million in a funding round that included Genovese and executives from Uber and BlaBlaCar, with Genovese becoming its chairman. Brumbrum.it was then sold to Cazoo in 2022 for €80 million.

Genovese was the chairman of Alberto Genovese Technologies, the holding company established by Genovese in late 2019 that controlled more than 50% of Prima Assicurazioni, a stake that was estimated at approximately €150 million. Through this company, he supported these and other ventures. In 2020, Genovese said that he had attracted €160 million in capital, created more than €1 billion in value, and was involved in companies employing around 1,200 people. Genovese adopted a serial-entrepreneur model, reinvesting the proceeds of his successful ventures into other start-ups and combining capital, expertise, and experience across them. He also established a personal hub in the area around Piazza Cordusio in Milan, where he brought together some of the nine start-ups in which he had invested and applied what colleagues described as the "Genovese touch", centred on identifying talent, assembling teams, and helping projects scale. Around the same period, Genovese held stakes in several start-ups, including Abiby, a beauty company; Zappyrent and Jobtech, both in the tech sector; and Mirta.com, an e-commerce company. As a result of his successes, he was dubbed "the king of start-ups", and was also variously described as "the wizard of start-ups", a "genius", and a "successful businessman".

Following his arrest in November 2020, Genovese was removed as chairman and CEO of Prima Assicurazioni, with his responsibilities transferred to co-founder George Ottathycal. Blackstone and Goldman Sachs, which held stakes in the company, supported the decision. Moreover, Alberto Genovese Technologies, the holding company through which he controlled a majority stake in Prima Assicurazioni, revoked him as a director and subsequently changed its name to First Technologies Holding in December. Prima Assicurazioni also appointed an external law firm to conduct an internal investigation into Genovese's conduct in managing the company and to look for evidence of possible misconduct. By 2021, Genovese still held small stakes in around ten smaller companies, including Abiby and Hostess.it. In early 2021, investigators were examining the ownership structure of Prima Assicurazioni, which they said was linked to the Swiss holding company Alej Holding AG, based in the canton of Zug. The company formerly known as Alberto Genovese Technologies held a 58.31% stake in Prima Assicurazioni among 15 shareholders, and its reported shareholders included Luxembourg-based AGH SA, Alej Holding AG, and TDA Industries GmbH, a Swiss company reportedly controlled through Zanjero Limited, based in Nicosia, Cyprus. In July 2026, while serving his sentence under a semi-custodial regime, Genovese returned to the tech sector with the €40 million project named Laura.it, a new start-up focused on digital motor insurance.

== Criminal proceedings ==
=== Arrest and investigations ===
In October 2020, Genovese was accused of sexually assaulting an 18-year-old woman at his Milan penthouse, Terrazza Sentimento, after she had allegedly been rendered unconscious with drugs. The case attracted widespread media attention, and led to a broader investigation into multiple alleged assaults, as the parties held at the penthouse reportedly involved extensive drug use. He was arrested on 6 November 2020 on allegations that he had drugged and sexually assaulted a young woman for approximately 20 hours during a party at his Milan penthouse. According to the complainant's account, she was allegedly drugged during the party and taken to a room where she was subjected to sexual violence, while a bodyguard stationed outside prevented other people from entering. The investigation subsequently expanded as other women came forward with allegations of sexual assault, including two additional complaints reported in January 2021. Further reports emerged in the following days, including the account of another woman who told prosecutors that she had been abused during a party, while investigators also began examining the circumstances surrounding other parties and possible victims.

By January 2021, six other women had filed complaints concerning alleged sexual violence. The prosecution accused Genovese of a second sexual assault against a 23-year-old model in Ibiza on 10 July 2020, allegedly after she had been rendered unconscious by a combination of cocaine and ketamine; a second precautionary detention order was issued in connection with the case in February 2021. The prosecution also initially investigated allegations made by two other women; however, those allegations were subsequently separated from the main case after a judge rejected the prosecution's request for Genovese's arrest in relation to them. At the same time, prosecutors opened a separate line of inquiry into the origin of Genovese's wealth and his business interests, examining the ownership and management of companies and start-ups connected to him, including entities based abroad.

During questioning in October 2021, Genovese maintained that he had been a "slave" to drugs and said that he had not perceived "particular dissent" from the women with whom he had sex, whom he described as similarly intoxicated. According to a later reconstruction of his life, a period of increasing cocaine and drug use and increasingly frequent parties at his Milan apartment began around 2016, marking what was described as a progressive personal decline. In statements made during the subsequent proceedings, Genovese said that the period between the seizure of his penthouse and his arrest had been the period in which he had used the most drugs, and described his arrest as having come at a point when he believed he had reached the lowest point of his life.

=== Sexual assault and drug trafficking conviction ===
For the sexual assault and drug-related charges arising from the 2020 incidents in Milan and Ibiza, Genovese requested a fast-track trial, which was approved in June 2022 by the Milan court. The charges concerned two women: an 18-year-old Italian model and student who was allegedly assaulted during a party at Terrazza Sentimento in Milan on 10 October 2020, and a 23-year-old Italian model who was allegedly assaulted at Villa Lolita, a luxury villa in Ibiza, on 10 July 2020. The 18-year-old later said that she had feared for her life during the assault, while the 23-year-old was reported to have suffered injuries that left her unable to continue working as a model and with a 40% permanent disability. The investigation also involved Genovese's then-girlfriend, Sarah Borruso, who was initially investigated for alleged complicity in the Ibiza assault, for which she was subsequently convicted as a co-defendant and sentenced to two years and five months' imprisonment.

Genovese's defence argued that his conduct was connected to drug addiction and mental health problems and sought recognition of diminished capacity. More specifically, Genovese's lawyers sought his full acquittal on the charges concerning the 23-year-old woman, while arguing for recognition of diminished capacity and the minimum sentence in relation to the assault against the 18-year-old woman. A defence psychological assessment stated that Genovese had personality disorders and was affected by Asperger syndrome, and argued that these conditions, combined with his consumption of alcohol and drugs, had impaired his ability to understand that the women were not consenting.

In September 2022, the Milan court sentenced him to eight years and four months' imprisonment for the rape of two women and drug-related offences. The court rejected the defence's arguments concerning diminished capacity and found that the violence had been committed with conscious cruelty. Genovese subsequently waived his right to appeal. Moreover, the court ordered Genovese to pay a €50,000 provisional compensation payment (provvisionale) to the 18-year-old victim, while leaving the full assessment of damages to separate civil proceedings; her lawyers had sought approximately €1.5 million in compensation. In January 2023, following his waiver of the appeal, the sentence was reduced to six years and eleven months under sentence-reduction provisions introduced by the Cartabia reform. Although the reduction was a consequence of the applicable procedural provisions and did not overturn the convictions for rape, it drew criticism from the Italian national network of anti-violence centres, which argued that the Cartabia reform had further reduced a sentence that was already limited and could result in Genovese being released before the victims received adequate compensation. The sentence became final in March 2023 at six years and eleven months: five years and four months for drug trafficking and one year and seven months for sexual violence.

=== Further allegations and civil damages ===
Following the first conviction, further allegations were investigated; five of seven cases were ultimately archived, while the remaining allegations led to a second trial conducted between December 2023 and July 2024. In February 2024, Genovese chose a fast-track trial for the second set of proceedings, which concerned further allegations involving other women, as well as charges of obstruction of justice and possession of child sexual abuse material. The trial phase began in May 2024.

In this separate second trial, concluded in July 2024, Genovese was acquitted of the sexual-assault charges involving a 24-year-old former girlfriend, who had accused him of multiple assaults between 2019 and 2020. He was instead convicted of a separate attempted sexual assault, obstruction of justice, and possession of child sexual abuse material. The attempted assault concerned a 22-year-old woman who—according to the prosecution—had been lured into a room by Borruso and found semi-conscious and undressed on 25 February 2020. Borruso was convicted as a co-defendant for the attempted sexual assault and sentenced to one year in prison; her sentence was subsequently converted into one year of community service in Rome. Genovese was sentenced to 15 months' imprisonment, in continuation with the definitive six-year-and-eleven-month sentence from the first proceedings, and fined €6,000. The court found it proven that he had offered €8,000 to the 18-year-old victim from the first case in an attempt to induce her to alter the accusations in her complaint, and that he had possessed child sexual abuse material. The court also transmitted the case materials to the Milan Prosecutor's Office for an investigation into the former girlfriend on suspicion of calumny.

The full amount of civil damages owed to the victims has not been publicly determined beyond the €50,000 provisional payment ordered in the 2022 criminal proceedings; Genovese had previously offered €130,000 to the first victim and €25,000 to the second, but both offers were rejected. In January 2023, the first victim appealed on civil grounds, seeking slightly more than €2 million in damages, after the criminal court had awarded her a €50,000 provisional payment and referred the assessment of the full damages to the civil court. In the second trial, the victim of the attempted sexual assault for which Genovese was convicted was awarded €5,000 in compensation. By September 2024, the first victim had received the €50,000 provisional compensation payment ordered in the criminal proceedings, together with an additional undisclosed amount to settle the civil aspects of her claim.

=== Media coverage and impact ===
The case received extensive media coverage in Italy, drawing attention in part because of Genovese's public profile as a prominent entrepreneur in the startup and tech sectors and the details that emerged during the investigation. It sparked a broad public debate on issues including sexual consent, substance abuse, and excesses associated with entrepreneurial circles and Milan's nightlife. The case also prompted debate over media coverage and victim-blaming. In November 2020, journalist Vittorio Feltri was criticised for an editorial published in Libero, in which he described the 18-year-old victim as "naive" and questioned her decision to attend Genovese's home. The controversy also involved an article published by Il Sole 24 Ore about the case, which was criticised for its treatment of the events and subsequently modified. Politician Laura Boldrini wrote an article addressing the media coverage of the case that was not published by the Italian edition of HuffPost, then led by Mattia Feltri, the son of Vittorio Feltri. The controversy was subsequently discussed by Vittorio Feltri and journalist Peter Gomez on the television programme La Confessione, where Feltri maintained that describing the victim as "naive" was not an offence, while Gomez argued that the article had contributed to victim-blaming. Genovese subsequently put Terrazza Sentimento up for sale.

=== Tax evasion ===
In January 2021, Genovese was investigated in a separate financial investigation into his business activities and wealth. Prosecutors registered him for the alleged fraudulent transfer of assets, examining a network of companies and start-ups in which he held ownership interests or management positions, including entities based abroad. The investigation was intended to establish whether some of the companies had been used to conceal his ownership and whether there were grounds for allegations of tax fraud or money laundering. The financial investigation subsequently focused on Genovese's bank accounts, corporate holdings, and financial transactions.

In April 2021, a Milan judge rejected a request by prosecutors to seize €4.3 million in connection with alleged tax offences relating to 2018 and 2019. Prosecutors alleged that Genovese had treated certain employment-related income as capital income and had used the holding company Auliv in connection with the disposal of shares in Facile.it. In November 2021, Italy's Supreme Court of Cassation confirmed the seizure of €4.3 million. In its reasoning, the Supreme Court found that the tax allegations concerned, among other things, the treatment of income derived from Genovese's activities at Facile.it and the use of Auliv to manage financial flows and corporate interests. Prosecutors alleged that the arrangements had enabled him to finance personal expenditure, including the purchase and renovation of a villa in Ibiza and other luxury expenses.

In June 2024, in the tax evasion proceedings arising from the financial investigation opened in January 2021, Genovese sought a plea agreement over €4.3 million in unpaid taxes, proposing a ten-month sentence converted into a €75,000 monetary penalty. On 2 July, the Milan court ratified the agreement, imposing the ten-month sentence converted into a €75,000 monetary penalty; Genovese had already reimbursed the tax authorities.

== Imprisonment and rehabilitation ==
In July 2021, Genovese left pre-trial detention at San Vittore Prison to undergo drug rehabilitation at the Crest community in Cuveglio, where he continued a drug-rehabilitation programme while under house arrest and electronic monitoring. According to his lawyer, Genovese had recognised the seriousness of his drug use and was determined to undertake a deeper rehabilitation process. Genovese returned to prison in February 2023, when he was transferred to Bollate to serve the remainder of his sentence following the finalisation of the conviction. The proceedings also included drug-related charges alongside the two rape convictions, while a separate investigation concerned an additional alleged assault.

In May 2023, Genovese sought a further reduction of his sentence, arguing that the conditions he had experienced during his pre-trial detention at San Vittore Prison amounted to inhuman or degrading treatment. The application was based on Article 35-ter of the Italian penitentiary system, which provides for a reduction of the remaining sentence in cases where a prisoner has been subjected to treatment contrary to Article 3 of the European Convention on Human Rights. Following a hearing before the Milan Supervisory Court on 15 May, the judge reserved her decision on the application. At the same time, Genovese sought therapeutic community placement as an alternative to continued imprisonment. The Milan Prosecutor General's Office gave a favourable opinion to the request, noting that his remaining sentence was less than four years, and the case was referred to the Milan Supervisory Court. After it postponed its decision pending further documentation and a psychiatric assessment, the Milan Supervisory Court subsequently rejected the request in November 2023, concluding that Genovese had not adequately confronted the aspects of his personality associated with the offences and expressing concern that his focus on the risk of returning to drug use did not correspond to a comparable concern about the possible repetition of sexual offences.

In August 2024, the Milan Supervisory Court approved Genovese's request to perform volunteer work outside the detention facility. In December 2025, he reportedly spent his days volunteering among immigrants and homeless people, while remaining detained at night. In April 2026, Genovese was granted semi-liberty status, allowing him to work during the day while remaining subject to detention arrangements. His later activities also coincided with broader initiatives concerning prisoners' rights and the Italian prison system.

== Personal life ==
Genovese described travel as a personal interest and said that he had visited 94 countries by 2020. As of 2021, his property and residential interests reportedly included a penthouse in central Milan, a villa in Ibiza, and rented villas in Mykonos and Formentera, while his financial interests extended to Switzerland, Luxembourg, Cyprus, and the Cayman Islands. In December 2022, while living in a residential rehabilitation community, Genovese married his university girlfriend, whom he had met in 1995. After obtaining a law degree in 2016, she supported him throughout his personal and legal difficulties in the 2020s.

Also in 2022, with judicial approval, Genovese and his sister, Laura Genovese, established the Franco Latanza Foundation. The foundation, named after his grandfather, offers free support to families living with a loved one's drug addiction, providing a listening ear, online psychological counselling, guidance and support towards treatment programmes. In 2023, the organisation was renamed the Laura and Alberto Genovese Foundation, retaining its focus on supporting people affected by drug addiction and their families. From 2024, Genovese began volunteering with the House of Charity in Milan, assisting with applications for housing registration by immigrants and disadvantaged people, and later also volunteered with the Wall of Dolls, an organisation supporting women and victims of femicide.

Starting in 2026, through their foundation, Genovese and his sister expanded their social engagement by funding the Italian Movement for Prisoners' Rights, founded by Giulia Troncatti, to support human rights in prisons and the social reintegration of inmates. In February 2026, the foundation launched House of Stefano, a residential community in Bodio Lomnago dedicated to providing accommodation and rehabilitation for people affected by drug addiction, offering therapeutic and social reintegration programmes. In July 2026, Genovese joined the board of directors of the association Hands Off Cain as head of fundraising.

== In popular culture ==
In November 2025, the events leading to the conviction of Genovese became the subject of Terrazza Sentimento (Start Up, Fall Down: From Billionaire to Convict), a docu-series produced by Paolo Garramone for Fremantle and directed by Nicola Prosatore, released on Netflix. The series reconstructs the events surrounding the parties held at Genovese's Milan penthouse and examines the social environment in which they took place. It uses judicial records, police testimony, and interviews with people connected to the parties, while scenes inside the apartment were recreated using artificial intelligence (AI). The docu-series received mixed reviews from Italian critics, with particular attention given to its use of artificial intelligence and to the way it combined documentary material with reconstruction and commentary.

Corriere della Sera criticised the series for combining archival material, interviews, investigative journalism, fiction, and AI-generated reconstructions in what was considered an unclear narrative. La Repubblica likewise criticised the use of AI reconstructions and simulated chats, arguing that the series blurred the boundary between empathy and entertainment. Other critics placed greater emphasis on the series' treatment of the women involved and its examination of victim blaming. Corriere della Sera noted that the women, who had been harshly judged when the case first emerged, are presented as the vulnerable side of the story, while Style praised the series for treating the women involved without a judgmental attitude and for examining the social and cultural environment surrounding the events. iO Donna highlighted the documentary's attempt to connect the case to wider issues surrounding the sexual freedom of women and the social tendency to blame victims, while noting the central role of the AI reconstructions in the production's visual approach. The series was also criticised by the Italian Parents Movement (Moige), which argued that its treatment of Genovese's background and the Milan nightlife scene risked making the portrayal of the entrepreneur overly sympathetic and softening the representation of the dangers associated with drug use.
