= Rita Bernardini =

Italian politician (born 1952)

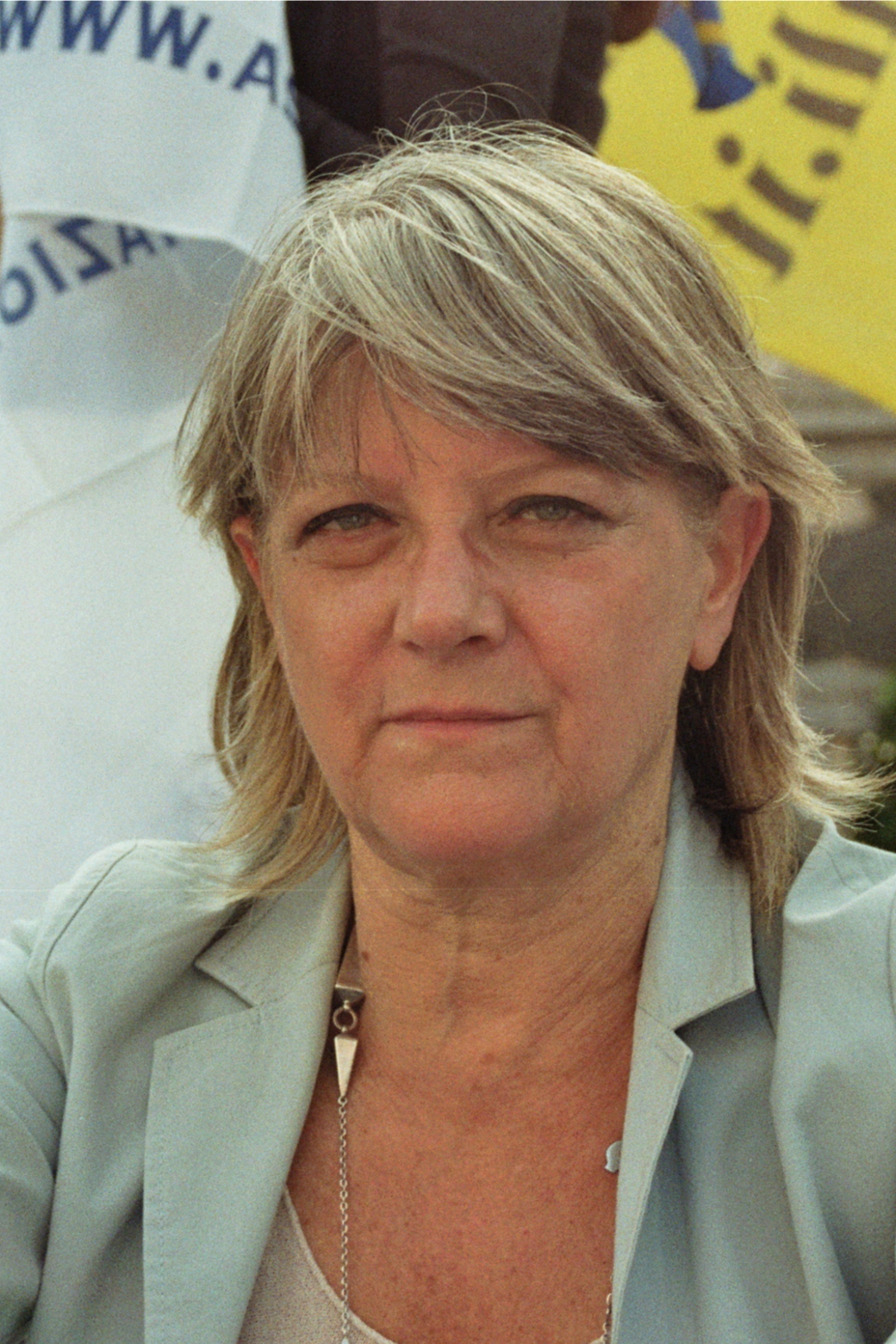
- Bernardini in 2014

National Secretary of the Italian Radicals
- In office November 2013 – November 2015

Member of the Chamber of Deputies
- In office 29 April 2008 – 14 March 2013

National Secretary of the Italian Radicals
- In office 2006 – 29 June 2008
- Preceded by: Daniele Capezzone
- Succeeded by: Antonella Casu

Personal details
- Born: 27 December 1952 (age 73) Rome, Italy
- Party: PR (1975–present); ALC (2002–present)
- Other political affiliations: LP (1995–2013); PD (2008–2013); RI (2003–2016)
- Education: Commercial technical institute diploma

Rita Bernardini (born 27 December 1952) is an Italian politician and nonviolent activist. A longtime member of the Radical Party of Marco Pannella, she served twice as national secretary of the Italian Radicals (2006–2008 and 2013–2015) and was a member of the Chamber of Deputies from 2008 to 2013. Before entering parliament she spent two decades as a Radical activist, working at Radio Radicale and taking part in the referendum campaigns and acts of civil disobedience of the 1990s. She is the president of Hands Off Cain, a Radical association campaigning for the abolition of the death penalty and for humane prison conditions, and is known for her repeated hunger strikes against prison overcrowding in Italy.

== Career ==
=== Early years and Radio Radicale ===
Bernardini was born in Rome on 27 December 1952 and holds a diploma from a commercial technical institute. She joined the Radical Party in 1975 and worked at the party's radio station, Radio Radicale, from 1983 until the early 1990s, ultimately as deputy director.

=== Referendum campaigns and civil disobedience ===
In the mid-1990s she was active in the Club Pannella. During the referendum campaign of autumn 1995 she went on a prolonged hunger strike, part of a protest by Pannella's Reformers against what they called the silence of the media on the referendums; by mid-November she had reached her 35th day of fasting. In the same campaign she was one of eight Reformers who stood naked on the stage of a Rome theatre in protest, while Pannella took part only as an off-stage voice.

On 25 October 1997, at a public distribution of hashish organised by Pannella in central Rome as an act of civil disobedience against the drug laws, she threw sachets of hashish into the crowd from the stage. She was arrested together with Pannella and five other activists, and they were placed under house arrest. At the 2000 Lazio regional election she was the Radicals' candidate for president of the region, running against Francesco Storace and Piero Badaloni, and was not elected.

=== First term as secretary (2006–2008) ===
In 2006 Bernardini succeeded Daniele Capezzone as national secretary of the Italian Radicals. She resigned from the post after her election to the Chamber of Deputies, and on 29 June 2008 the party elected Antonella Casu to replace her.

==== 2007 remarks on money laundering in Rome ====
In August 2007, on the margins of a press conference at the Chamber of Deputies on the annual report to Parliament on drug addiction, Bernardini said that Neapolitan was increasingly the language spoken in the bars and restaurants around the seats of government in central Rome, and that she suspected a large money-laundering operation behind this, possibly involving the Camorra. The remarks drew criticism across the political spectrum. The mayor of Naples, Rosa Russo Iervolino, called them generic and racist accusations, while the prefect of Rome, Achille Serra, described them as serious and unfounded, although he put the issue on the agenda of the provincial committee for public order. Bernardini replied that she had never equated Neapolitans with the Camorra and rejected the charge of racism.

=== Member of the Chamber of Deputies (2008–2013) ===
She was elected to the Chamber of Deputies at the 2008 Italian general election on the Democratic Party list. She sat with the Democratic Party group from May 2008 until the end of the legislature in March 2013 and was a full member of the Justice Committee throughout. In August 2009 she asked the Chamber for the list of its suppliers and consultants, and obtained it from the Speaker, Gianfranco Fini, in February 2010 after starting a hunger strike in protest. She made the data public; among other things they showed that the Chamber was spending 54 million euros a year on rented offices.

=== Second term as secretary (2013–2015) ===
In November 2013 she was again elected secretary of the Italian Radicals, on Pannella's proposal, serving until November 2015. In 2015 she was appointed to coordinate the working group of the Italian Ministry of Justice's States General on Penal Execution devoted to prisoners' right to family and emotional ties.

== Prisoners' rights activism ==
=== Civil disobedience and hunger strikes ===
On 30 January 2019 Bernardini delivered to Pope Francis, in a public audience, letters and signatures from almost 20,000 Italian prisoners. In July 2019 she was questioned by the Carabinieri after the seizure of 32 cannabis plants she was growing on her terrace as an act of civil disobedience in favour of the legalisation of medical cannabis.

In November 2020, during the COVID-19 pandemic, she began a 35-day hunger strike calling for measures against prison overcrowding; the initiative was joined by thousands of citizens and publicly supported by writers and intellectuals including Roberto Saviano, Sandro Veronesi and Adriano Sofri, and was suspended after Prime Minister Giuseppe Conte agreed to meet her.

=== Hands Off Cain ===
Bernardini is the president of Hands Off Cain (Nessuno tocchi Caino), whose secretary is Sergio D'Elia. She held the office at the time of the association's eighth congress, held in December 2019 in the theatre of Opera prison near Milan, and was confirmed at the eleventh congress, held in December 2025 at the Beccaria juvenile prison in Milan.

In early 2024 she and the deputy Roberto Giachetti held a 24-day hunger strike to press for a bill on the special early release of prisoners, which by April was still at the hearing stage in the Chamber's Justice Committee. In June 2024 she began a hunger and thirst strike, accusing the government of failing to act on prisons as the bill risked being voted down in the Chamber. In May 2025 she suspended a 22-day hunger strike after the President of the Senate, Ignazio La Russa, spoke in favour of Giachetti's bill on early release. She has also been heard by the Chamber of Deputies on early release measures.

=== 2024 European Parliament election ===
At the 2024 European Parliament election in Italy she headed the United States of Europe list in the Insular Italy constituency. She conducted the campaign while on a hunger strike against prison overcrowding, which she ended after 28 days, in early June, when the Chamber scheduled the debate on the early release bill backed by Giachetti and Hands Off Cain. She obtained 3,883 preference votes, and the list fell short of the electoral threshold.

=== Recognition and other roles ===
In June 2025 she received the "Riccardo Polidoro" prize of the Union of Italian Penal Chambers, awarded unanimously "in defence of the dignity and hope of prisoners". In May 2026 she joined the scientific committee of the Italian Movement for Prisoners' Rights (Movimento Italiano Diritti Detenuti), a Milan-based non-profit association founded by Giulia Troncatti to protect the rights of detained persons and support their social reintegration.
