= Facile.it =

Italian online price comparison company

- Type: Società per azioni
- Industry: Online price comparison, insurance brokerage, credit intermediation
- Founded: 2008; 18 years ago, as Assicurazione.it
- Founder: Alberto Genovese, Andrea Piccioni, Silvio Pagliani
- Headquarters: Milan, Italy
- Area served: Italy
- Key people: Maurizio Pescarini (CEO)
- Revenue: €248 million (2025)
- Owner: Silver Lake
- Number of employees: c. 1,600 (group) (2026)
- Subsidiaries: Facile.it Broker di Assicurazioni S.p.A. Facile.it Mediazione Creditizia S.p.A.
- Website: www.facile.it

Facile.it S.p.A. is an Italian company that operates an online price comparison platform and acts as an insurance broker and credit intermediary. Based in Milan, it compares and distributes motor insurance and other insurance products, mortgages and consumer loans, household contracts for electricity, gas, broadband and mobile telephony, and long-term car rental.

The company was founded in 2008 as Assicurazione.it by Alberto Genovese and took its present name in 2011. Control has changed three times: Oakley Capital bought a majority holding in 2014, EQT in 2018 and Silver Lake in 2022. Bloomberg News reported a valuation of about €1 billion for the 2022 sale, about twenty times an EBITDA of €55 million. Silver Lake described the transaction as one that made Facile.it Italy's second unicorn.

Group revenue reached €248 million in 2025, and the group employed about 1,600 people. Facile.it places roughly €1 billion of insurance premiums a year. It sells through its websites, its call centre and a network of shops and agents.

== History ==
=== Origins and early growth (2008–2014) ===
The business began in 2008 as Assicurazione.it, a website comparing motor third-party liability quotes, founded by the entrepreneur Alberto Genovese, together with Andrea Piccioni and Silvio Pagliani. In 2011 it was renamed Facile.it and extended its activity to financial products; in the same year Holding Italiana Quattordicesima (H14), an investment vehicle of the Berlusconi family, took a stake that BeBeez reported at 20 per cent.

Revenue rose from €19.3 million in 2012 to €28.6 million in 2013, with EBITDA of €4.7 million and about 1.5 million monthly users.

=== Oakley Capital (2014–2018) ===
In September 2014 the British investment firm Oakley Capital acquired a 75 per cent holding at about €100 million. Mauro Giacobbe became chief executive in place of Genovese. The company acquired the mortgage comparison site Mutui.it in 2015 and opened a network of franchised high-street shops in 2017.

By 2017 revenue had reached €66 million, with EBITDA of €12.6 million, a net profit of €1.2 million and about three million monthly users.

=== EQT (2018–2022) ===
In May 2018 the Swedish private equity firm EQT acquired a majority stake, with Oakley reinvesting €80 million for a minority holding. Il Sole 24 Ore journalist Carlo Festa reported a price of €400–450 million. Facile.it also acquired a 60 per cent stake in the credit intermediary Nexus for €7 million. Alberto Genovese, who had founded Facile.it and in 2014 had also founded the insurance agency Prima Assicurazioni, sat on the advisory board of the controlling fund in Luxembourg, a body with a consultative role chaired by Gianandrea de Bernardis, at the time chairman of Cerved. He left it in 2018.

The company opened a customer service centre in Cagliari in 2020, and in December of that year announced a change of leadership, with Giacobbe moving to the chairmanship and Tobias Stuber taking over as chief executive from April 2021. In 2021 Facile.it entered the automotive market by acquiring MiaCar, a platform for car sales and leasing, and it also bought TCS Group, a business active in insurance distribution and advice.

=== Silver Lake (2022–present) ===
In June 2022 the American investment firm Silver Lake acquired a majority stake from EQT and Oakley Capital, which reinvested alongside it. Bloomberg News reported a valuation of about €1 billion, and Silver Lake described the transaction as making Facile.it "Italy's second unicorn". At the time of the sale the sellers reported revenue of about €140 million for 2021, more than four million unique monthly visitors, 39 shops and over 3,000 agents.

In July 2023 the company announced the appointment of Maurizio Pescarini, previously chief executive of Genertel, as chief executive with effect from 1 October 2023, succeeding Stuber. Under Pescarini the company made a series of acquisitions: Gruppo Finital, an insurance intermediary founded in 1958, in March 2024; Gruppo Italfinance, a corporate credit broker, in February 2025; Horizon Automotive, a car mobility platform founded in 2020, in September 2025; and the automotive services company Infodrive Service together with the insurance agency Fideas in June 2026.

BeBeez reported group revenue of €248 million for 2025, up 24 per cent, with EBITDA of €86 million and about 1,600 employees, and a €410 million bond listed on the Vienna Stock Exchange maturing in December 2029.

== Operations ==
Facile.it S.p.A. operates the comparison service for household contracts, covering electricity, gas, broadband, mobile telephony, current accounts and payment cards, and long-term car rental, and it runs the group's marketing activities. Two regulated subsidiaries carry out the intermediation: Facile.it Broker di Assicurazioni S.p.A., an insurance broker operating on the facile.it and assicurazione.it websites, and Facile.it Mediazione Creditizia S.p.A., a credit intermediary operating on facile.it, prestiti.it and mutui.it. The company is headquartered in Milan and has further offices in Cagliari, Catania, Tirana and Turin.

The company is remunerated by commissions paid by the providers with which it has distribution agreements, and compares the offers of those partners; a 2016 investigation by the Italian magazine Altreconomia reported commissions of between 2.5 and 14 per cent for each policy sold. Alongside the website, distribution runs through a call centre, a network of agents and franchised shops.

By the end of 2025 the group offered about ninety products under agreements with more than thirty insurers. The range covered motor policies, other non-life lines, life cover placed with Athora Italia and GamaLife, and insurance against natural catastrophes.

The network of branded shops grew from 52 outlets at the start of 2024 to more than seventy by the end of 2025, with a target of about one hundred by 2027. Over the same period the Facile Partner network of self-employed intermediaries was reduced from about 3,300 to some 1,500, and roughly a hundred of them came to work almost exclusively for the company. The physical channel accounted for about a quarter of revenue in 2025, and the company said it wanted that share to reach 40 per cent by the end of its plan.

Milano Finanza reported that Facile.it was spending more than €20 million a year on technology and that it was the leading broker and adviser for motor insurance in Italy. EQT, on selling the company, called it the largest online price comparison platform in Italy.

== Regulatory and legal proceedings ==
In April 2015 the Italian Competition Authority (AGCM) closed proceedings PS9212 by making binding a set of commitments offered by Facile.it. The company undertook to explain its savings claims, to publish the list of partner insurers and the commissions received from each, and to offer optional cover only on an opt-in basis, ending the automatic pre-selection of add-ons.

In May 2021 the AGCM opened investigation I856 into four comparison websites, including Facile.it Broker di Assicurazioni, and thirteen insurers, over an alleged exchange of sensitive information on the terms of direct motor insurance sales dating back to 2012. The proceedings were closed on 10 May 2022 with commitments and without any finding of infringement; the parties undertook to aggregate and anonymise the data exchanged, to reduce the frequency of reporting and to make the reports available to all insurers on fair and non-discriminatory terms.

In December 2020 the consumer association Konsumer complained to the AGCM about the relationship between Facile.it and Prima Assicurazioni, both founded by Genovese, arguing that the comparison site favoured Prima's products over those of other insurance intermediaries. Milano Finanza reported the complaint, and in February 2021 reported that the authority was examining that allegation alongside the information given to consumers on loans and motor policies.

In October 2021 the AGCM fined two group companies a total of €7 million for unfair commercial practices: €5.95 million for Facile.it Broker di Assicurazioni and €1.05 million for Facile.it Mediazione Creditizia. The authority found that loan comparisons had been presented without making clear that the quotes were provisional, that the status of Prima Assicurazioni as an intermediary rather than an insurer had not been adequately disclosed, and that automatic pop-ups and unsolicited telephone calls amounted to aggressive practices. The company appealed. The regional administrative court of Lazio confirmed the fine in 2023, but in June 2025 the Council of State annulled it in judgment no. 4843/2025. The court found that consumers had been clearly informed and that the call centre activity did not constitute an aggressive practice.
