= Globe-Trotter =

British luggage manufacturer

- Type: Private
- Industry: Luxury Goods
- Founded: 1897
- Headquarters: London, England
- Products: Luggage & Travel Accessories
- Number of employees: 70
- Website: www.globe-trotter.com

Globe-Trotter is a British manufacturer of luxury luggage, based in Mayfair, founded in 1897. The company operates from a factory in Hertfordshire where it employs 70 employees to make their luggage by hand.

== History ==
Globe-Trotter traces its history to 1897 when the Sächsische Kofferfabrik "Stabilist" (Stabilist Saxon Trunk Manufactory) Friedr. Jone & Co. was founded in Dresden, Kingdom of Saxony.

In 1900, the company registered the name "Stabilist" at the Imperial Patent Office, Berlin. At this stage, it was using woven mesh plates [Geflechtsplatten] to produce suitcases, travel bags and other cases. Many of the contemporary German case-makers also used this material: although it was praised for its lightness, it was neither durable nor hard-wearing.

In 1901, Globe-Trotter patented the use of Vulcanised Fibreboard in their suitcases, a material consisting of paper, cotton and wood pulp. The use of Vulcanised Fibreboard was one of the main characteristics that distinguished Globe-Trotter suitcases in the early days due to the strength and durability of the suitcases despite their light weight.

In an advert used in their 1912-13 catalogue, the company used an elephant from the renowned Hagenbeck Zoo in Hamburg to test its strength. The advert claims that the breaking weight of a Globe-Trotter cabin trunk was eight tons.

=== Change of ownership ===
Globe-Trotter became a shareholding company in 1959. Its first directors were David Nelken, his wife and their son Henry. Malcolm Payton, the former owner of Custom Cases, bought Globe-Trotter when Henry Nelken prematurely died in 1985.

Two years after the purchase, Payton moved production to Waltham Forest. He introduced minor innovations – changing the way that the machines were powered, and switching some suppliers of locks and handles.

In 2020, Oakley Capital (“Oakley”) acquired a majority stake in Globe-Trotter Group from entrepreneur Toshiyasu Takubo. As part of the transaction, Toshiyasu Takubo, who has developed the brand significantly in the Japanese market, retained a minority stake in the company.

== Materials ==
The first Globe-Trotter cases were made using 'woven mesh plates' [Geflechtsplatten], a process whereby the marrow of cane or rattan was cut in strips and interwoven with hemp to produce a mesh which could be pressed and cut into plates.

As these cases lacked durability, Walther von Lillienthal began experimenting with Vulcanised Fibre at the company’s Dresden factory. By using hot steam and hot and cold pipes, he found a way to bend the fiber plates and increase the strength of suitcases and trunks. Globe-Trotter patented the use of Vulcanised Fibre in Autumn 1900 and is still the only company to use it to produce suitcases.

For its suitcase handles, corners and straps Globe-Trotter uses 3mm vegetable-tanned hide leather. The leather comes from the family-owned J&FJ Baker in Devon, the last remaining tannery of its kind in Britain.

== Logo ==
Globe-Trotter's logo features a central symbol – which can be seen to represent either a compass star or the North Star. Both are applicable to the Globe-Trotter brand, since they have traditionally been used to guide travellers on their journeys.

The logo – branded with the words 'Globe-Trotter' and 'Stabilist' – was first registered in Germany in 1901. The same logo, without the term 'Stabilist', was registered in the UK a year later.

== Notable patrons ==
Globe-Trotter was selected as the official case provider for BOAC in the 1960s.

The late Queen Elizabeth II started to use Globe-Trotter luggage in 1947 during her honeymoon with Prince Phillip, and did so throughout her lifetime. Sir Winston Churchill also used a dispatch case from the brand during his time as Chancellor of the Exchequer, and Robert Falcon Scott used a Globe-Trotter case during his Terra Nova Expedition.
