= Resolutions concerning death penalty at the United Nations =

United Nations General Assembly resolution first adopted 2007

UN General Assembly Resolution 62/149
- In favour Against Abstained
- Date: 18 December 2007
- Meeting no.: 76
- Code: A/RES/62/149 (Document)
- Subject: Moratorium on the use of the death penalty
- Voting summary: 104 voted for; 54 voted against; 29 abstained
- Result: Approved

UN General Assembly Resolution 63/168
- Date: 18 December 2008
- Meeting no.: 70
- Code: A/RES/63/168 (Document)
- Subject: Moratorium on the use of the death penalty
- Voting summary: 106 voted for; 46 voted against; 34 abstained
- Result: Approved

UN General Assembly Resolution 65/206
- Date: 21 December 2010
- Meeting no.: 71
- Code: A/RES/65/206 (Document)
- Subject: Moratorium on the use of the death penalty
- Voting summary: 109 voted for; 41 voted against; 35 abstained
- Result: Approved

At Italy's instigation, a resolution for a moratorium on the death penalty was presented by the European Union (EU) in partnership with eight co-author member States to the General Assembly of the United Nations (UN), calling for general suspension (not abolition) of capital punishment throughout the world. It was approved on 15 November 2007 by the Third Committee, and then subsequently adopted on 18 December by the UN General Assembly resolution 62/149. New Zealand played a central role facilitating agreement between the co-author group and other supporters.

It calls on states that maintain the death penalty to establish a moratorium on the use of the death penalty with a view to abolition, and in the meantime, to restrict the number of offences which it punishes and to respect the rights of those on death row. It also calls on States that have abolished the death penalty not to reintroduce it. Like all General Assembly resolutions, it is not binding on any state.

On 18 December 2007, the United Nations General Assembly voted 104 to 54 in favour of resolution A/RES/62/149, which proclaims a global moratorium on the death penalty, with 29 abstentions (as well as 5 absent at the time of the vote). Italy had proposed and sponsored this resolution. After the resolution's approval, Italian Foreign Minister Massimo D'Alema declared: "Now we must start working on the abolition of the death penalty." On 18 December 2008, the General Assembly adopted another resolution (A/RES/63/168) reaffirming its previous call for a global moratorium on capital punishment 106 to 46 (with 34 abstentions and another 6 were absent at the time of the vote). Working in partnership with the EU, New Zealand and Mexico were co-facilitators of the draft text which was developed over a period of six months, which Chile then presented to the UN General Assembly on behalf of cosponsors.

On 21 December 2010, the 65th General Assembly adopted a third resolution (A/RES/65/206) with 109 countries voting in favour, 41 against and 35 abstentions (another seven countries were absent at the time of the vote). On 20 December 2012, the 67th General Assembly adopted a fourth resolution (A/RES/67/176) with 111 countries voting in favour, 41 against and 34 abstentions (another seven countries were absent). On 18 December 2014, the 69th General Assembly adopted a fifth resolution (A/RES/69/186) with 117 countries voting in favour, 38 against and 34 abstentions (another four countries were absent). On 19 December 2016, the 71st General Assembly adopted a sixth resolution (A/RES/71/187) with 117 countries voting in favour, 40 against and 31 abstentions (another five countries were absent). On 16 December 2018, 121 voted in favour of the 7th resolution, 35 against, and 32 abstained. On 16 December 2020, 123 voted in favour of the 8th resolution, 38 against, and 24 abstained. On 15 December 2022, 125 voted in favour of the 9th resolution, 37 against, 22 abstained, and 9 absent. On 17 December 2024, 130 voted in favour of the 10th resolution, 32 against, 22 abstained, and 9 absent.

== International campaign ==
=== Hands Off Cain ===
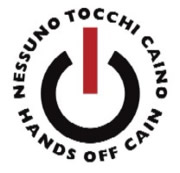
Logo of the organization "Hands Off Cain"

The UN moratorium campaign was launched in Italy by the association Hands Off Cain, affiliated to the Nonviolent Radical Party. The association against death penalty and torture was founded in Rome in 1993 by former left-wing terrorist and current nonviolent politician and human rights activist Sergio D'Elia, with his first wife Mariateresa Di Lascia and Italian Radicals' liberal leaders Marco Pannella and Emma Bonino (former European Commissioner).

=== History ===
In 1994, a resolution for a moratorium was presented for the first time at the United Nations General Assembly (UNGA) by the Italian government. It lost by eight votes. Since 1997, through Italy's initiative, and since 1999 through the EU's endeavour, the United Nations Commission on Human Rights (UNCHR) has been approving a resolution calling for a moratorium on executions with a view to completely abolishing the death penalty, every year. The 2007 vote at the Third Committee of the United Nations General Assembly saw intense diplomatic activity in favour of the moratorium by EU countries, and by the Nonviolent Radical Party itself; the Catholic Community of Sant'Egidio joined forces by submitting to the UN an appeal and 5,000,000 signatures asking for the moratorium to be passed.

== Full text of resolution 62/149 ==
The General Assembly,

Guided by the purposes and principles contained in the Charter of the United Nations,

Recalling the Universal Declaration of Human Rights, (Note: Resolution 217 A (III).) the International Covenant on Civil and Political Rights (Note: Resolution 2200 A (XXI), annexe.) and the Convention on the Rights of the Child, (Note: United Nations, Treaty Series, vol. 1577, No. 27531.)

Recalling also the resolutions on the question of the death penalty adopted over the past decade by the Commission on Human Rights in all consecutive sessions, the last being its resolution 2005/59 of 20 April 2005, (Note: Official Records of the Economic and Social Council, 2005, Supplement No. 3 and corrigenda (E/2005/23 and Corr.1 and 2), chap. II, sect. A.) in which the Commission called upon states that still maintain the death penalty to abolish it completely and, in the meantime, to establish a moratorium on executions,

Recalling further the important results accomplished by the former Commission of Human Rights on the question of the death penalty, and envisaging that the Human Rights Council could continue to work on this issue,

Considering that the use of the death penalty undermines human dignity, and convinced that a moratorium on the use of the death penalty contributes to the enhancement and progressive development of Human Rights, that there is no conclusive evidence that the death penalty's deterrent value and that any miscarriage or failure of justice in the death penalty's implementation is irreversible and irreparable,

Welcoming the decisions taken by an increasing number of States to apply a moratorium on executions, followed in many cases by the abolition of the death penalty,

1. Expresses its deep concern about the continued application of the death penalty;
2. Calls upon all States that still maintain the death penalty to:
  1. Respect international standards that provide safeguards guaranteeing the protection of the rights of those facing the death penalty, in particular the minimum standards, as set out in the annexe to Economic and Social Council resolution 1984/50 of 25 May 1984;
  2. Provide the Secretary-General with information relating to the use of Capital Punishment and the observance of the safeguards guaranteeing the protection of the rights of those facing the death penalty;
  3. Progressively restrict the use of the death penalty and reduce the number of offences for which it may be imposed;
  4. Establish a moratorium on executions with a view to abolishing the death penalty;
3. Calls upon States which have abolished the death penalty not to reintroduce it;
4. Requests the Secretary-General to report to the General Assembly at its sixty-third session on the implementation of the present resolution;
5. Decides to continue consideration of the matter at its sixty-third session under the same agenda item.

== Full text of resolution 63/168 ==
The General Assembly,

Reaffirming its resolution 62/149 of 18 December 2007 on a moratorium on the use of the death penalty,

Welcoming the decisions taken by an increasing number of States to apply a moratorium on executions and the global trend towards the abolition of the death penalty,

1. Welcomes the report of the Secretary-General on the implementation of resolution 62/149, (Note: A/63/293 and Corr. 1.) and the conclusions and recommendations contained therein;
2. Requests the Secretary-General to provide a report on progress made in the implementation of resolution 62/149 and the present resolution, for consideration during its sixty-fifth session, and calls upon Member States to provide the Secretary-General with information in this regard;
3. Decides to continue consideration of the matter at its sixty-fifth session under the item entitled "Promotion and protection of human rights".

== Full text of resolution 65/206 ==
The General Assembly,

Guided by the purposes and principles contained in the Charter of the United Nations,

Recalling the Universal Declaration of Human Rights, (Note: Resolution 217 A (III).) the International Covenant on Civil and Political Rights (Note: Resolution 2200 A (XXI), annexe.) and the Convention on the Rights of the Child, (Note: United Nations, Treaty Series, vol. 1577, No. 27531.)

Reaffirming its resolutions 62/149 of 18 December 2007 and 63/168 of 18 December 2008 on the question of a moratorium on the use of the death penalty, in which the General Assembly called upon States that still maintain the death penalty to establish a moratorium on executions with a view to abolishing it,

Mindful that any miscarriage or failure of justice in the implementation of the death penalty is irreversible and irreparable,

Convinced that a moratorium on the use of the death penalty contributes to respect for human dignity and to the enhancement and progressive development of human rights, and considering that there is no conclusive evidence of the deterrent value of the death penalty,

Noting ongoing national debates and regional initiatives on the death penalty, as well as the readiness of an increasing number of Member States to make available information on the use of the death penalty,

Noting also the technical cooperation among Member States in relation to moratoriums on the death penalty,

1. Welcomes the report of the Secretary-General on the implementation of resolution 63/168 (Note: A/65/280 and Corr. 1.) and the recommendations contained therein;
2. Also welcomes the steps taken by some countries to reduce the number of offences for which the death penalty may be imposed and the decisions made by an increasing number of States to apply a moratorium on executions, followed in many cases by the abolition of the death penalty;
3. Calls upon all States:
  1. To respect international standards that provide safeguards guaranteeing protection of the rights of those facing the death penalty, in particular the minimum standards, as set out in the annexe to Economic and Social Council resolution 1984/50 of 25 May 1984, as well as to provide the Secretary-General with information in this regard;
  2. To make available relevant information with regard to their use of the death penalty, which can contribute to possible informed and transparent national debates;
  3. To progressively restrict the use of the death penalty and to reduce the number of offences for which it may be imposed;
  4. To establish a moratorium on executions with a view to abolishing the death penalty;
4. Calls upon States which have abolished the death penalty not to reintroduce it, and encourages them to share their experience in this regard;
5. Requests the Secretary-General to report to the General Assembly at its sixty-seventh session on the implementation of the present resolution;
6. Decides to continue its consideration of the matter at its sixty-seventh session under the item entitled "Promotion and protection of human rights".

== Voting record ==
=== 2007 ===
| In favour (104) | Abstaining (29) | Against (54) | Absent (5) |
|---|---|---|---|
| Albania; Algeria; Andorra; Angola; Argentina; Armenia; Australia; Austria; Azerbaijan; Belgium; Benin; Bolivia; Bosnia and Herzegovina; Brazil; Bulgaria; Burkina Faso; Burundi; Cambodia; Canada; Cape Verde; Chile; Colombia; Congo; Costa Rica; Cote D'Ivoire; Croatia; Cyprus; Czech Republic; Denmark; Dominican Republic; Ecuador; El Salvador; Estonia; Finland; France; Gabon; Georgia; Germany; Greece; Guatemala; Haiti; Honduras; Hungary; Iceland; Ireland; Israel; Italy; Kazakhstan; Kiribati; Kyrgyzstan; Latvia; Liechtenstein; Lithuania / Luxembourg; Madagascar; Mali; Malta; Marshall Islands; Mauritius; Mexico; Micronesia (Federated States of); Monaco; Montenegro; Mozambique; Namibia; Nauru; Nepal; Netherlands; New Zealand; Nicaragua; Norway; Palau; Panama; Paraguay; Philippines; Poland; Portugal; Republic of Moldova; Romania; Russian Federation; Rwanda; Samoa; San Marino; Sao Tome and Principe; Serbia; Slovakia; Slovenia; South Africa; Spain; Sri Lanka; Sweden; Switzerland; Tajikistan; The Former Yugoslav Republic of Macedonia; Timor-Leste; Turkey; Turkmenistan; Tuvalu; Ukraine; United Kingdom; Uruguay; Uzbekistan; Vanuatu; Venezuela (Bolivarian Republic of) | Belarus; Bhutan; Cameroon; Central African Republic; Cuba; Democratic Republic of the Congo; Djibouti; Equatorial Guinea; Eritrea; Fiji; Gambia; Ghana; Guinea; Kenya; Lao People's Democratic Republic; Lebanon; Lesotho; Liberia; Malawi; Morocco; Niger; Republic of Korea; Sierra Leone; Swaziland; Togo; United Arab Emirates; United Republic of Tanzania; Viet Nam; Zambia | Islamic Republic of Afghanistan; Antigua and Barbuda; Bahamas; Bahrain; Bangladesh; Barbados; Belize; Botswana; Brunei Darussalam; Chad; China; Comoros; Democratic People's Republic of Korea; Dominica; Egypt; Ethiopia; Grenada; Guyana; India; Indonesia; Iran (Islamic Republic of); Iraq; Jamaica; Japan; Jordan; Kuwait; Libyan Arab Jamahiriya; Malaysia; Maldives; Mauritania; Mongolia; Myanmar; Nigeria; Oman; Pakistan; Papua New Guinea; Qatar; Saint Kitts and Nevis; Saint Lucia; Saint Vincent and the Grenadines; Saudi Arabia; Singapore; Solomon Islands; Somalia; Sudan; Suriname (Ba'athist Syria) Syrian Arab Republic; Thailand; Tonga; Trinidad and Tobago; Uganda; United States of America; Yemen; Zimbabwe | Guinea-Bissau; Peru; Senegal; Seychelles; Tunisia |
Observer States: Holy See

=== 2008 ===
| In favour (106) | Abstaining (34) | Against (46) | Absent (6) |
|---|---|---|---|
| Albania; Algeria; Andorra; Angola; Argentina; Armenia; Australia; Austria; Azerbaijan; Belgium; Benin; Bolivia; Bosnia and Herzegovina; Brazil; Bulgaria; Burkina Faso; Burundi; Cambodia; Canada; Cape Verde; Chile; Colombia; Congo; Costa Rica; Cote D'Ivoire; Croatia; Cyprus; Czech Republic; Denmark; Dominican Republic; Ecuador; El Salvador; Estonia; Ethiopia; Finland; France; Gabon; Georgia; Germany; Greece; Guinea-Bissau; Haiti; Honduras; Hungary; Iceland; Ireland; Israel; Italy; Kazakhstan; Kyrgyzstan; Latvia; Liechtenstein; Lithuania; Luxembourg / Madagascar; Mali; Malta; Marshall Islands; Mauritius; Mexico; Micronesia (Federated States of); Monaco; Montenegro; Mozambique; Namibia; Nauru; Nepal; Netherlands; New Zealand; Nicaragua; Norway; Palau; Panama; Paraguay; Peru; Philippines; Poland; Portugal; Republic of Moldova; Romania; Russian Federation; Rwanda; Samoa; San Marino; Sao Tome and Principe; Serbia; Slovakia; Slovenia; Somalia; South Africa; Spain; Sri Lanka; Sweden; Switzerland; Tajikistan; The Former Yugoslav Republic of Macedonia; Timor-Leste; Turkey; Turkmenistan; Tuvalu; Ukraine; United Kingdom; Uruguay; Uzbekistan; Vanuatu; Venezuela (Bolivarian Republic of) | Bahrain; Belarus; Bhutan; Cameroon; Central African Republic; Cuba; Djibouti; Eritrea; Fiji; Gambia; Ghana; Guatemala; Guinea; Jordan; Kenya; Lao People's Democratic Republic; Lebanon; Lesotho; Liberia; Malawi; Mauritania; Morocco; Niger; Oman; Papua New Guinea; Republic of Korea; Senegal; Sierra Leone; Suriname; Togo; United Arab Emirates; United Republic of Tanzania; Viet Nam; Zambia | Afghanistan; Antigua and Barbuda; Bahamas; Bangladesh; Barbados; Belize; Botswana; Brunei Darussalam; China; Comoros; Democratic People's Republic of Korea; Dominica; Egypt; Grenada; Guyana; India; Indonesia; Iran (Islamic Republic of); Iraq; Jamaica; Japan; Kuwait; Libyan Arab Jamahiriya; Malaysia; Maldives; Mongolia; Myanmar; Nigeria; Pakistan; Qatar; Saint Kitts and Nevis; Saint Lucia; Saint Vincent and the Grenadines; Saudi Arabia; Singapore; Solomon Islands; Sudan; Swaziland (Ba'athist Syria) Syrian Arab Republic; Thailand; Tonga; Trinidad and Tobago; Uganda; United States of America; Yemen; Zimbabwe | Chad; Democratic Republic of the Congo; Equatorial Guinea; Kiribati; Seychelles; Tunisia |
Observer States: Holy See

=== 2010 ===
| In favour (109) | Abstaining (35) | Against (41) | Absent (7) |
|---|---|---|---|
| Albania; Algeria; Andorra; Angola; Argentina; Armenia; Australia; Austria; Azerbaijan; Belgium; Bhutan; Bolivia (Plurinational State of); Bosnia and Herzegovina; Brazil; Bulgaria; Burkina Faso; Burundi; Cambodia; Canada; Cape Verde; Chile; Colombia; Congo; Costa Rica; Croatia; Cyprus; Czech Republic; Denmark; Dominican Republic; Ecuador; El Salvador; Estonia; Finland; France; Gabon; Gambia; Georgia; Germany; Greece; Guatemala; Guinea-Bissau; Haiti; Honduras; Hungary; Iceland; Ireland; Israel; Italy; Kazakhstan; Kiribati; Kyrgyzstan; Latvia; Liechtenstein; Lithuania; Luxembourg; Madagascar; Maldives; Mali; Malta / Marshall Islands; Mexico; Micronesia (Federated States of); Monaco; Mongolia; Montenegro; Mozambique; Namibia; Nauru; Nepal; Netherlands; New Zealand; Nicaragua; Norway; Palau; Panama; Paraguay; Peru; Philippines; Poland; Portugal; Republic of Moldova; Romania; Russian Federation; Rwanda; Samoa; San Marino; Sao Tome and Principe; Serbia; Slovakia; Slovenia; Somalia; South Africa; Spain; Sri Lanka; Sweden; Switzerland; Tajikistan; The Former Yugoslav Republic of Macedonia; Timor-Leste; Togo; Turkey; Turkmenistan; Tuvalu; Ukraine; United Kingdom; Uruguay; Uzbekistan; Vanuatu; Venezuela (Bolivarian Republic of) | Bahrain; Belarus; Cameroon; Central African Republic; Comoros; Cuba; Democratic Republic of the Congo; Djibouti; Dominica; Eritrea; Fiji; Ghana; Guinea; Jordan; Kenya; Lao People's Democratic Republic; Lebanon; Lesotho; Liberia; Malawi; Mauritania; Morocco; Niger; Nigeria; Oman; Republic of Korea; Senegal; Sierra Leone; Solomon Islands; Suriname; Thailand; United Arab Emirates; United Republic of Tanzania; Viet Nam; Zambia | Afghanistan; Antigua and Barbuda; Bahamas; Bangladesh; Barbados; Belize; Botswana; Brunei Darussalam; China; Democratic People's Republic of Korea; Egypt; Ethiopia; Grenada; Guyana; India; Indonesia; Iran (Islamic Republic of); Iraq; Jamaica; Japan; Kuwait; Libyan Arab Jamahiriya; Malaysia; Myanmar; Pakistan; Papua New Guinea; Qatar; Saint Kitts and Nevis; Saint Lucia; Saint Vincent and the Grenadines; Saudi Arabia; Singapore; Sudan; Swaziland (Ba'athist Syria) Syrian Arab Republic; Tonga; Trinidad and Tobago; Uganda; United States of America; Yemen; Zimbabwe | Benin; Chad; Cote D'Ivoire; Equatorial Guinea; Mauritius; Seychelles; Tunisia |
Observer States: Holy See

=== 2012 ===
| In favour (110) | Abstaining (34) | Against (42) | Absent (7) |
|---|---|---|---|
| Albania; Algeria; Andorra; Angola; Argentina; Armenia; Australia; Austria; Azerbaijan; Belgium; Benin; Bhutan; Bolivia; Bosnia and Herzegovina; Brazil; Bulgaria; Burkina Faso; Burundi; Cambodia; Canada; Cape Verde; Central African Republic; Chad; Chile; Colombia; Congo; Costa Rica; Cote D'Ivoire; Croatia; Cyprus; Czechia; Denmark; Dominican Republic; Ecuador; El Salvador; Estonia; Finland; France; Gabon; Georgia; Germany; Greece; Guatemala; Guinea-Bissau; Haiti; Honduras; Hungary; Iceland; Ireland; Israel; Italy; Kazakhstan; Kyrgyzstan; Latvia; Liechtenstein; Lithuania; Luxembourg; Madagascar; Mali; Malta; Marshall Islands; Mexico; Micronesia (Federated States of); Monaco; Mongolia; Montenegro; Mozambique; Nauru; Nepal; Netherlands; New Zealand; Nicaragua; Norway; Palau; Panama; Paraguay; Peru; Philippines; Poland; Portugal; Republic of Moldova; Romania; Russian Federation; Rwanda; Samoa; San Marino; Serbia; Seychelles; Sierra Leone; Slovakia; Slovenia; Somalia; South Africa; South Sudan; Spain; Sweden; Switzerland; Tajikistan; The Former Yugoslav Republic of Macedonia; Timor-Leste; Togo; Tunisia; Turkey; Turkmenistan; Tuvalu; Ukraine; United Kingdom of Great Britain and Northern Ireland; Uruguay; Uzbekistan; Vanuatu; Venezuela | Belarus; Cameroon; Comoros; Cuba; Democratic Republic of the Congo; Djibouti; Eritrea; Fiji; Guinea; Indonesia; Jordan; Kenya; Lao PDR; Lebanon; Lesotho; Malawi; Maldives; Mauritania; Morocco; Namibia; Niger; Nigeria; Papua New Guinea; Republic of Korea; Senegal; Solomon Islands; Sri Lanka; Suriname; Thailand; United Arab Emirates; UR Tanzania; Viet Nam; Zambia | Afghanistan; Bahamas; Bahrain; Bangladesh; Barbados; Belize; Botswana; Brunei Darussalam; China; Democratic People's Republic of Korea; Dominica; Egypt; Ethiopia; Grenada; Guyana; Islamic Republic of Iran; Iraq; Jamaica; Japan; Kuwait; Libya; Malaysia; Myanmar; Oman; Pakistan; Qatar; Saint Kitts and Nevis; Saint Lucia; Saint Vincent and the Grenadines; Saudi Arabia; Singapore; South Africa; South Sudan; Sudan; Swaziland (Ba'athist Syria) Syrian Arab Republic; Tonga; Trinidad and Tobago; Uganda; United States; Yemen; Zimbabwe | Antigua and Barbuda; Equatorial Guinea; Gambia; Ghana; Kiribati; Mauritius; Sao Tome and Principe |
Observer States: Holy See, State of Palestine

== See also ==
- International Commission Against the Death Penalty
- World Coalition Against the Death Penalty
- World Day Against the Death Penalty
