= World Day Against the Death Penalty =

Internationally observed day on 10 October

- Observed by: Worldwide
- Type: International
- Significance: Civil awareness day
- Date: October 10
- Next time: 10 October 2027
- Frequency: Annual

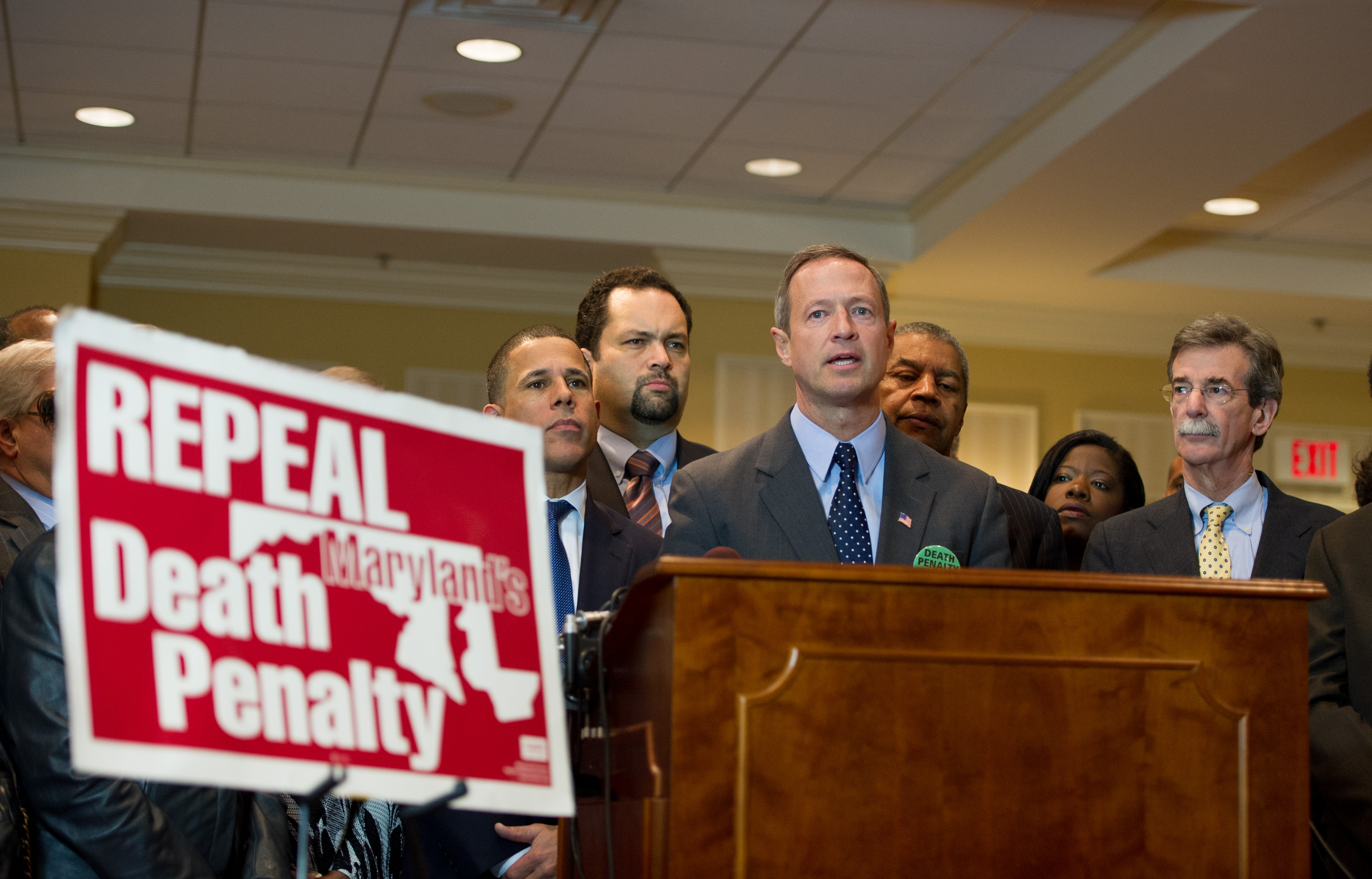
Death Penalty Repeal Press Conference

World Day Against the Death Penalty (10 October) is a day to advocate for the abolition of the death penalty and to raise awareness of the conditions and the circumstances which affect prisoners with death sentences. The day was first organised by the World Coalition Against the Death Penalty in 2003. It has since taken place annually on 10 October.

The day is supported by numerous NGOs and world governments, including Amnesty International, the European Union and the United Nations. On 26 September 2007, the Council of Europe also declared 10 October to be the European Day Against the Death Penalty.

The day is celebrated in more than 180 countries.

It focuses on a particular theme, to highlight certain issues surrounding capital punishment. In 2018, the theme was the living conditions on death row. Previous themes included poverty, terrorism, drug crimes and mental health.

== See also ==
- Capital punishment
- Capital punishment debate
- Cities for Life Day
- World Coalition Against the Death Penalty
- International Commission Against the Death Penalty
- United Nations moratorium on the death penalty
