= Decide! =

Former Italian political association

Decide! (Decidere!) was an Italian libertarian political association established and led by Daniele Capezzone.

The group was sometimes also referred to as Decidere.net, in reference to its official website. It was one of the founding members of Silvio Berlusconi's The People of Freedom party. Capezzone was later appointed spokesman of the new party.

== History ==
Decide! was launched in June 2007 by Daniele Capezzone, former secretary of the Italian Radicals and member of the Chamber of Deputies for the Rose in the Fist, before leaving both. At the beginning the association was affiliated neither to centre-left The Union, from which Capezzone hailed, nor to the centre-right House of Freedoms, but it seemed definitely closer to the latter. Capezzone himself became closer to Forza Italia's leader Silvio Berlusconi and was harshly critical of Prodi II Cabinet, which he did not support anymore.

Decide! was officially presented to the public on 3 September 2007 and organized two major rallies: the first one on pensions (Rome, 22 September) and the second one on taxes (Milan, 29 September). On 7 November Capezzone finally left the Italian Radicals and the Rose in the Fist.

On 12 May 2008 Capezzone was appointed spokesman of Forza Italia. A year later, after that he had led Decide! into The People of Freedom led by Berlusconi, Capezzone was appointed spokesman of the new party.

== Ideology ==
The association had a political platform based on 13 points, which included a flat tax at 20%, fiscal federalism, presidentialism and first-past-the-post electoral system, liberalizations and privatizations. The association had its focus principally on economic issues and had ties with the Bruno Leoni Institute and the Italian Liberal Party (2004).

== Members ==
Leading members of Decide! included Giovanni Orsina, Giancarlo Pagliarini, and Andrea Romano.
