= Movimento Italiano Genitori =

The Italian Parents Movement (Italian: Movimento Italiano Genitori, known also by the acronym Moige) is an Italian non-profit, lobbying and advocacy organization in Rome, Italy. Its mission is protecting children and expanding rights for parents.

== Purpose ==
Italian Parents Movement (Movimento Italiano Genitori) is an organization that strives to work for the protection and safety of children using intervention and prevention methods.

The organization works on behalf of parents and children, giving concrete answers to their requests for help. For this, it promotes initiatives to counter harmful phenomena such as bullying, pedophilia, drugs and alcohol and to educate children to face everyday challenges, from driving to the internet.

Among the association's first activities was the establishment of the TV Observatory (now Osservatorio Media), a qualified team of industry experts watching television shows, in response to the growing need to protect children from too much television.

The themes expanded to cover almost every area that affects the daily lives of children and parents, presented today in 35 Italian provinces with a network of more than 50,000 parents. The main purpose is safeguarding the rights of children and adults in social life, the promotion of the figure of parents as a fundamental element of society and the responsible use of parental authority.

Through many social initiatives, the association aims to operate in five areas:

- Television and cinema
- School and education
- Pedophilia prevention
- Health and road safety
- Internet and new media
- Moige (Italian Parents Movement) recently promoted its channels with these motivations: «In addition to not falling into the easy path of vulgarity, they are current in content, and in an exhilarating key they naturally represent scenarios of everyday life from which it is possible also get excellent food for thought».

== Relation to other organizations ==
In 2007 Moige became part of European Parenting Association (EPA), a federation of parenting organizations.

In 2008 Moige became part of the National Forum for Parent Associations in the School (FoNAGS), established by the Ministry of Education, with the aim of creating a permanent benchmarking table between the parents' world and the Ministry.

It is a member of the Confederation of Organizations of Families of the Communauté Européenne (COFACE) and has been on the board since 2008, and founded of the Confederation of Meningitis Organizations (COMO), international co-ordination of associations for the fight against meningitis.

== Criticism and controversies ==
Over the years, the association has faced many criticisms of its representativeness of the Italian population and about its points of view on sexuality, homosexuality and censorship.

=== Sexuality ===
The Moige is defined as a nonpartisan and nondenominational organization. This definition, however, has been criticized in light of positions essentially matching Catholic morality. According to Moige's data as of 2014, thirty-two percent of children between 11 and 13 had seen pornographic images.

These positions, in particular, were published during the course of sexual education published until 2004 on the official website of the organization, held by biology professor Leda Galli Fiorillo, referred to as an expert in the subject. The course covered various topics, including pre-marital sex, contraception, masturbation and homosexuality.

==== Homosexuality ====
In various occasions the Moige was opposed to initiatives advancing the rights of LGBT communities, in particular regarding marriage and adoption and accepted therapies promoted by Joseph Nicolosi and his National Association for Research & Therapy of Homosexuality, with a series of three lessons about sex education, claiming that homosexuality can be cured, because it is not derived from genetic or hormonal imbalances but by psychological factors called "acquired factors" and treatable with psychotherapy, in contrast with the ethical code of the National Order of Psychologists which states that "the psychologist may not offer oneself to start any 'reparative therapy' of sexual orientation of a person".

The association makes a distinction between homosexual tendencies and sexual behavior. Those who are attracted to person of same sex but without emotional or sexual relationships with them can try to overcome their condition, do not have a direct responsibility, and therefore can be treated successfully. Those who seek sexual relationships with persons of same sex are directly responsible and cannot be cured, and stated also that homosexuality is a state full of suffering, similar to neurosis and not likely to be alleviated by any reversal of the current mentality. Moige argues that elements of mental disorder such as trauma or the absence of the father or mother during infancy lead boys and girls, respectively, to homosexuality.

==== Masturbation ====
The movement strongly discourages masturbation and consequently condemns those who approve and recommend masturbation as a means of self-knowledge and those who encourage it as an opportunity for personal and interior growth.

=== Censorship ===
The Moige claimed that television can be viewed by children without parental surveillance, in certain time slots and reports broadcasts of inappropriate television shows considered during those periods to the authorities.

The association attacked the television shows Will & Grace (broadcast on Italia1) and I Fantastici 5 (the Italian edition of Queer Eye, broadcast on La7) as an unacceptable form of proselytising, considering them harmful by showing homosexuals as happy people integrated in society.

The Mediaset's television channel Italia 1 was criticised for showing in the afternoon WWE SmackDown because of the risk of emulation by young people.

The association opposes the television broadcasting of some movies, in particular Lolita (denouncing its director Adrian Lyne and film distributor for incitement of pedophilia) and Eyes Wide Shut (even though the film was partially censored in compliance with Italian television regulations).
