= Mariateresa Di Lascia =

Italian politician and writer (1954–1994)

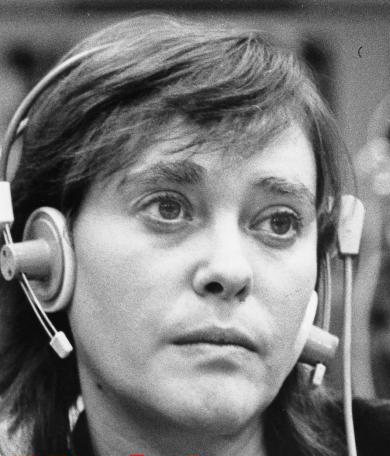
- Born: 3 January 1954; Rocchetta Sant'Antonio, Italy
- Died: 10 September 1994 (aged 40); Rome, Italy
- Spouse: Sergio D'Elia

Mariateresa Di Lascia (3 January 1954 – 10 September 1994) was an Italian politician and writer, activist, human rights' supporter, and advocate of non-violence.

== Early life and education ==
Di Lascia was born in Rocchetta Sant'Antonio, in the province of Foggia, part of the Italian region of Apulia, on 3 January 1954. She attended college at the University of Naples. She was studying medicine with the goal of becoming a lay missionary. Within three years, she had become so involved in her political activism that she left university.

== Political activity ==
Di Lascia joined the Radical Party (PR) in 1975. In 1982, she was elected as the national deputy secretary of the party under the leadership of Marco Pannella. Her initial activism was aimed at eliminating hunger. She coordinated the Survival 82 campaign, mobilising mayors in France, Belgium, and Italy to support laws against hunger. Di Lascia was also an environmental activist, acting to remove and prevent nuclear power in Italy. She proposed a penitentiary reform in 1990 and the abolition of the death penalty in 1993. Di Lascia created a campaign to support victims of the war of the former Yugoslavia with Adriano Sofri in 1993. She also demonstrated about the liberation of Tibet at the Human Rights Conference in Vienna the same year. Di Lascia was in favour of homoeopathy of Samuel Hahnemann and in 1991 founded the Naples-based Homeopathic Patients Association (APO), as well as advocating for its legislation. Di Lascia was the editor and a contributor for the newspaper Radical News in 1985 and 1986. Her articles were on ecology, medicine, justice, and political current affairs. She also aired shows on both Radio Radicale and on Tele Roma 56.

== Death ==
Di Lascia died in Rome on 10 September 1994, at the age of 40, due to cancer. Her death came just a few months after marrying Sergio D'Elia. Her first novel was Passage in Shadow, which won the Strega Prize in 1995.
