= Prima Assicurazioni =

Italian direct insurance company

Prima Assicurazioni S.p.A.
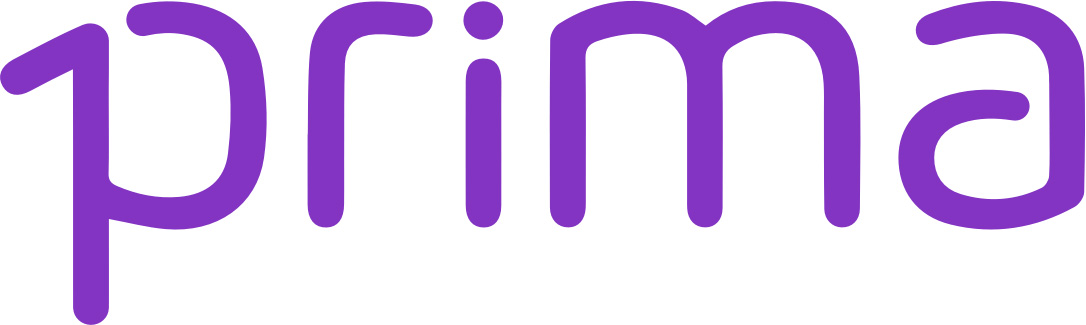
- Type: Società per azioni (S.p.A.)
- Industry: Insurance
- Founded: 2014; 12 years ago in Milan, Italy
- Founders: Alberto Genovese; George Ottathycal Kuruvilla
- Headquarters: Milan, Italy
- Area served: Italy, United Kingdom, Spain
- Key people: George Ottathycal Kuruvilla (chairman and chief executive officer)
- Products: Vehicle insurance, home, family and accident insurance
- Owner: Axa (51%)
- Website: www.helloprima.com

Prima Assicurazioni S.p.A. is an Italian insurance agency specialising in the sale of motor, motorcycle, van, home, family and accident policies.

The company distributes policies in Italy, the United Kingdom and Spain, both through its own website and through a network of brokers and agents, underwritten by Great Lakes Insurance (part of Munich Re), Zavarovalnica Triglav and Alwyn (Arch Capital Group). Its offices are in Milan, Rome, London and Madrid.

== History ==
Prima Assicurazioni was founded in Milan in 2014 by Alberto Genovese and George Ottathycal Kuruvilla.

In the summer of 2018 the company closed a €100 million capital increase subscribed by the investment bank Goldman Sachs and the private equity firm Blackstone, at the time the largest venture capital funding round raised in Italy. From 2019 the company began distributing its products through brokers and agents.

In April 2020 Prima opened a new office in Rome. In November 2020, following the arrest of founder and then chairman Alberto Genovese on charges of sexual assault and drug offences, the company removed him from all roles and appointed George Ottathycal Kuruvilla as chairman and chief executive officer.

By 2022 the company reported more than two million customers. In May 2022 the Carlyle Group joined Goldman Sachs and Blackstone in the company's shareholder base, and the company began selling policies in the United Kingdom and Spain after opening offices in London and Madrid.

In August 2025 the French insurance group Axa announced the acquisition of a 51% majority stake in Prima for about €500 million, valuing the company at around €1 billion. The acquisition was completed on 28 November 2025.

== Sports sponsorship ==
In 2019 Prima became an official partner and back-of-shirt sponsor of the Serie A football club ACF Fiorentina, under a three-year agreement starting with the 2019–20 season.

In 2022 the company became a sponsor of the MotoGP team Pramac Racing.

On 1 July 2025 the company's Spanish branch signed a three-year sponsorship agreement with Real Betis.
