= Oakley Capital Investments =

British investment trust

- Type: Public
- Traded as: LSE: OCI; FTSE 250 component
- Founded: 2007; 19 years ago
- Headquarters: Pembroke, Bermuda
- Key people: Caroline Foulger (chair)
- Website: www.oakleycapitalinvestments.com

Oakley Capital Investments (LSE: OCI), is a large British investment trust focused on investments in mid-market companies in the business services, consumer, education and technology sectors. The company is listed on the London Stock Exchange and is a constituent of the FTSE 250 Index.

== History ==
Established in 2007, the company is a fund of funds making investments in various funds managed by Oakley Capital. Indirect investments include a nursery business, Bright Stars, and a semi-conductor analysis business, TechInsights. It made a significant return on the disposal of its indirect investment in the legal platform, Vlex, in July 2025.

Previously listed as a specialist fund, the company transferred to the main market of the London Stock Exchange in July 2025.

The company is managed by Oakley Capital and the chair is Caroline Foulger.
