= World Coalition Against the Death Penalty =

International alliance of organizations

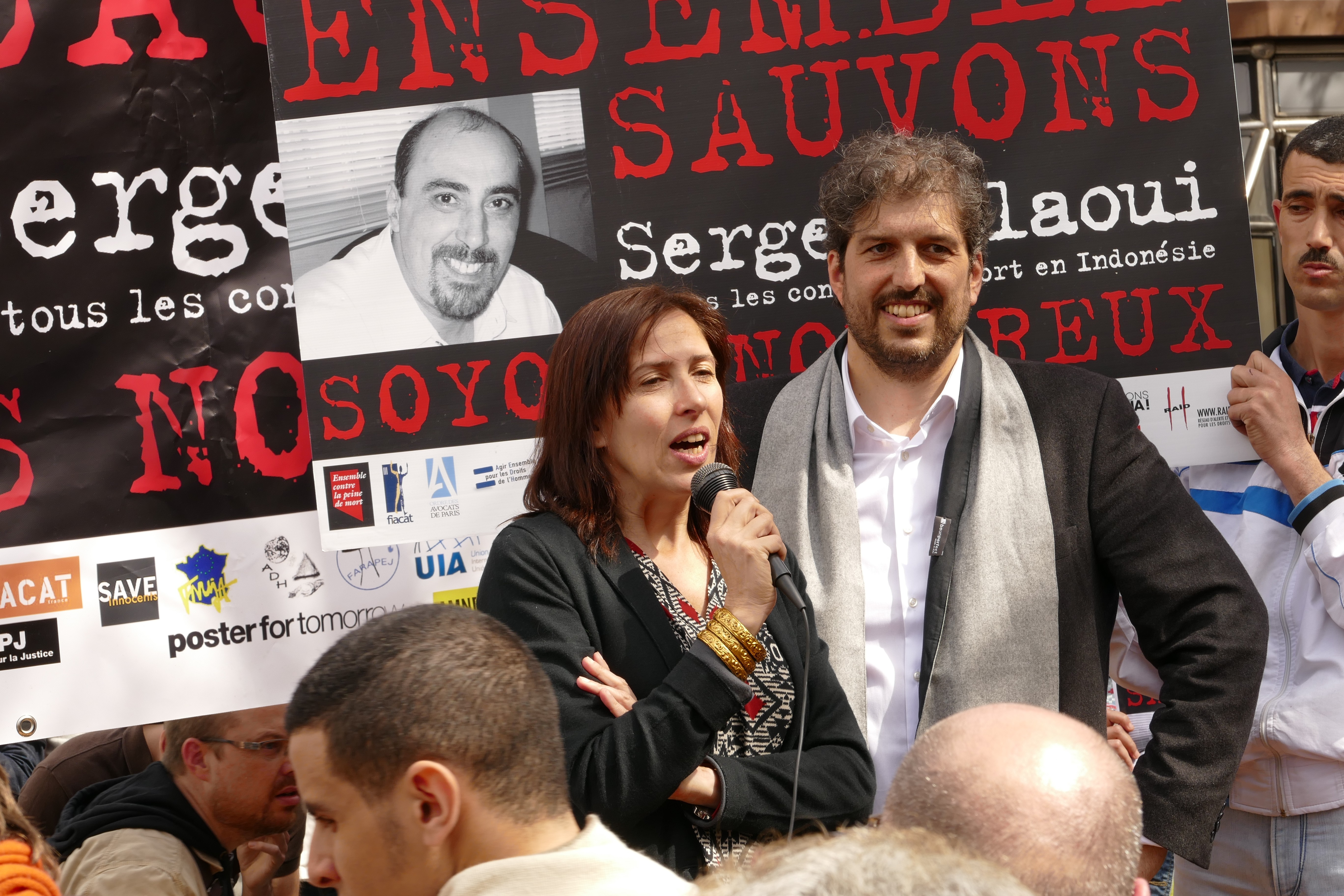
- Florence Bellivier, former President of the World Coalition, and Raphaël Chenuil-Hazan at a meeting for Serge Atlaoui in Paris in 2015
- Founded: 13 May 2002; 24 years ago
- Type: INGO
- Headquarters: Montreuil, France
- Location: Global
- Services: Human rights advocacy
- Fields: Legal advocacy
- President: Matthew James Goldberg
- Director: Aurélie Plaçais
- Website: worldcoalition.org

The World Coalition Against the Death Penalty is an international alliance of NGOs, bar associations, local governments and trade unions that aims to strengthen the international dimension of political opposition to capital punishment.

== Objective and funding ==
Founded in May 2002, the World Coalition is an association of more than 180 member organizations advocating for the abolition of capital punishment worldwide. The World Coalition facilitates lobbying after international organizations and states and organizes events of international concern. It contributes to commemorating the World Day Against the Death Penalty every 10 October. The World Coalition also encourages the creation of national or regional coalitions against the death penalty to strengthen initiatives taken in this regard. The World Coalition is funded by its members' contributions, the European Union, and some European governments, such as those of Belgium, Monaco and Switzerland. Other institutional funders also provide financial resources for some specific projects.

== Creation ==
On 22 June 2001, participants to the first World Congress Against the Death Penalty, an event held by French non-government organization (NGO) Ensemble contre la peine de mort, adopted the Strasbourg Declaration in the hemicycle of the Council of Europe. In paragraph 9, the signatories committed to "creat[ing] a world-wide co-ordination of abolitionist associations and campaigners, whose first goal will be to launch a world-wide day for the universal abolition of the death penalty". After several preparatory meetings in Paris and Brussels, organizations convened in Rome on 13 May 2002 to officially create the World Coalition Against the Death Penalty. A first Steering Committee composed of 11 members, in charge of defining the World Coalition's political strategy, was elected then renewed at each General Assembly. Since 2008, the World Coalition has been registered as an association under French law.

== Campaigns ==
=== World Day Against the Death Penalty ===
The World Coalition has made 10th of October the World Day Against the Death Penalty. The first occurrence of this annual event was celebrated in 2003. In 2007, the Committee of Ministries of the Council of Europe declared that a European Day Against the Death Penalty also be held every 10th of October, coinciding with the World Day. The World Day Against the Death Penalty aims to unite local initiatives in favor of abolition. The day is celebrated in more than 180 countries. Since 2005, every World Day has focused on a specific issue, which is selected and defined by the World Coalition:

- 2005: Africa towards abolition
- 2006: Miscarriages of justice
- 2007: The World decides (in order to support the resolution adopted on next 15 November by the United Nations General Assembly, calling on a moratorium on the death penalty)
- 2008: Focus on Asia
- 2009: Educate to abolition
- 2010: Death penalty and democracy
- 2011: Death penalty and cruel, inhuman and degrading treatments and punishments
- 2012: 10th anniversary of the World Day Against the Death Penalty
- 2013: High violent crime rates – Focus on the Caribbean
- 2014: Death penalty and mental illness
- 2015: Death penalty and drug trafficking
- 2016: Death penalty and terrorism
- 2017: Death penalty and poverty
- 2018: Death penalty and human dignity
- 2019: Death penalty and rights of the child
- 2020: Death penalty and legal counsel

=== International and regional protocols on the abolition ===
Since 2007, the World Coalition has been committed to a pluriannual campaign that encourages new states to ratify the Second Optional Protocol, an international treaty appended to the 1989 UN International Covenant on Civil and Political Rights that aims at the abolition of the death penalty. The World Coalition also supports the accession to regional protocols aiming at the abolition of the death penalty. In this regard, the World Coalition has released a joint statement with the Inter-American Commission on Human Rights to commemorate the 30th anniversary of the Protocol to the American Convention on Human Rights in 2020.

=== United Nations Moratorium on executions ===
Since 2007, the World Coalition has been encouraging United Nations member states to vote in favor of the resolution of the UN General Assembly on a moratorium on executions. The resolution was adopted for the first time in 2007 and has been submitted to the vote of the General Assembly every other year since 2008.

=== Securing abolition of capital punishment ===
The World Coalition helps its members organize initiatives and advocacy missions to prevent abolitionist countries from restoring capital punishment in law or carrying out new executions.

=== Increasing knowledge on the death penalty ===
The World Coalition and its network have committed to gathering and sharing information on capital punishment. The World Coalition's partnership with the Cornell Center on the Death Penalty Worldwide, that is associated with the Cornell University, has contributed to developing a database on the use of the death penalty around the world. The World Coalition also partners with institutes with a view to conducting survey, such as the one carried out by the GAMAAN Institute in September 2020.
