= Sergio D'Elia =

Italian activist (born 1952)

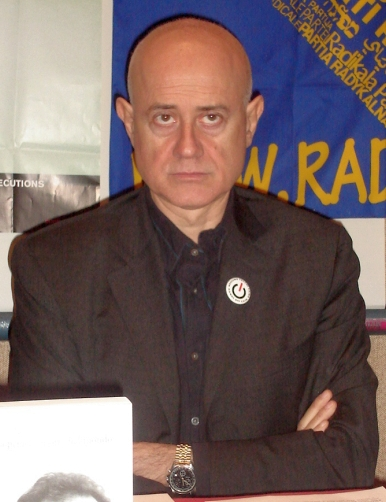

Member of the Chamber of Deputies
- In office 28 April 2006 – 28 April 2008

Personal details
- Born: 5 May 1952 (age 73) Pontecorvo, Italy
- Party: PR (1986–1989); LP (1989–1996); LB (1996–2001); RI (2001–present)
- Other political affiliations: PRT (1989–present)
- Spouse(s): Mariateresa Di Lascia (deceased in 1994); Elisabetta Zamparutti
- Profession: Politician

Sergio D'Elia (born 5 May 1952) is an Italian politician, activist, and former left-wing terrorist who became a human rights supporter and advocate of non-violence. D'Elia spent 12 years in prison for his affiliation to the terrorist organization Prima Linea; in 1986, he abandoned the Marxist–Leninist armed struggle by adopting a left-libertarian position, and soon joined the Radical Party (a social liberal and libertarian political organization).

In 1993, D'Elia founded in Rome, with his first wife Mariateresa Di Lascia, Marco Pannella, and former EU commissioner Emma Bonino (all politicians of the Radical Party), the non-government group Hands Off Cain (Nessuno tocchi Caino), which fights against the death penalty and torture in the world. The biggest accomplishment of D'Elia and Hands Off Cain was the United Nations moratorium on the death penalty in 2007, proposed by Italy's government.

D'Elia was a member of the Chamber of Deputies from 2006 to 2008.
