= ABC Mosquito =

Mosquito
- Type: Radial aero engine
- National origin: United Kingdom
- Manufacturer: ABC Motors
- Designer: Granville Bradshaw
- First run: 1916
- Number built: 1

The ABC Mosquito was a 120 hp (90 kW) six-cylinder radial aero engine designed by the noted British engineer Granville Bradshaw for use in light aircraft. The single Mosquito engine was built by ABC Motors, first running in 1916. It is thought that the design resulted from a bet between Harry Hawker and Bradshaw, Hawker proposing that Bradshaw could not build and fly a six-cylinder radial engine. The Mosquito used copper-plated steel Gnat cylinders. The engine was not a success.

== Applications ==
- BAT F.K. 22

== Specifications (Mosquito) ==
Data from Lumsden

=== General characteristics ===
- Type: 6-cylinder, single row, air-cooled radial engine
- Bore: 4.33 in (110 mm)
- Stroke: 5.51 in (140 mm)
- Displacement: 487 cu in (8 L)
- Dry weight: 180 lb (82 kg)

=== Components ===
- Valvetrain: Overhead valve, two valves per cylinder
- Fuel type: Petrol (40-50 Octane rating)
- Cooling system: Air-cooled

=== Performance ===
- Power output: 120 hp (90 kW)
- Specific power: 0.25 hp/cu in (11.25 kW/L)
- Power-to-weight ratio: 0.66 hp/lb (1 kW/kg)

== See also ==
- ABC motorcycles

Related lists

- List of aircraft engines
