= ABC Hornet =

1920s British piston aircraft engine

Hornet
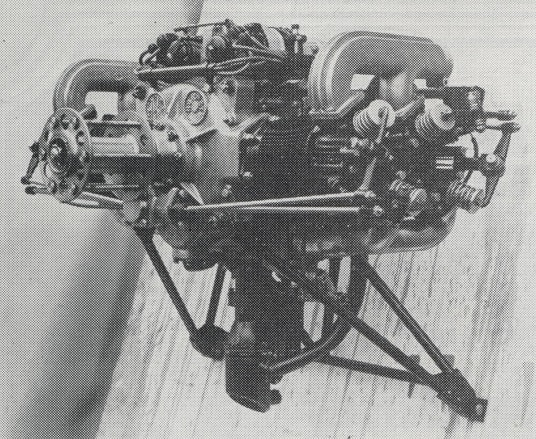
- Type: Flat engine
- National origin: United Kingdom
- Manufacturer: ABC Motors Limited
- Designer: Granville Bradshaw
- First run: 1929
- Developed from: ABC Scorpion

The ABC Hornet was an 80 hp (90 kW) four-cylinder aero engine designed in the late 1920s by the noted British engineer Granville Bradshaw for use in light aircraft. The Hornet was effectively a double Scorpion and was built by ABC Motors, first running in 1929.

In 1931 the engine was re-designed, including the adoption of the new Hiduminium alloys for the crankcase, exhaust manifolds and pistons.

== Applications ==
- Airship Development AD1
- Civilian Coupe
- Robinson Redwing
- Southern Martlet
- Westland Widgeon

== Specifications (Hornet) ==
Data from Lumsden

=== General characteristics ===
- Type: 4-cylinder, horizontally opposed, air-cooled piston engine
- Bore: 4.02 in (102 mm)
- Stroke: 4.8 in (124.5 mm)
- Displacement: 243.18 cu in (4 L)
- Length: 25.5 in (648 mm)
- Width: 39 in (990 mm)
- Height: 28 in (711 mm)
- Dry weight: 225 lb (102 kg)

=== Components ===
- Valvetrain: Overhead valve, two valves per cylinder
- Fuel type: Petrol (74 Octane rating)
- Cooling system: Air cooled

=== Performance ===
- Power output: 82 hp (61 kW) at 2,175 rpm (maximum continuous climb power)
- Specific power: 0.34 hp/cu in (15.25 kW/L)
- Compression ratio: 5.6:1
- Power-to-weight ratio: 0.37 hp/lb (0.6 kW/kg)

== See also ==
- ABC motorcycles

Related development

- ABC Scorpion

Comparable engines

- Continental A-40

Related lists

- List of aircraft engines
