= ABC (1920 automobile) =

ABC 12hp
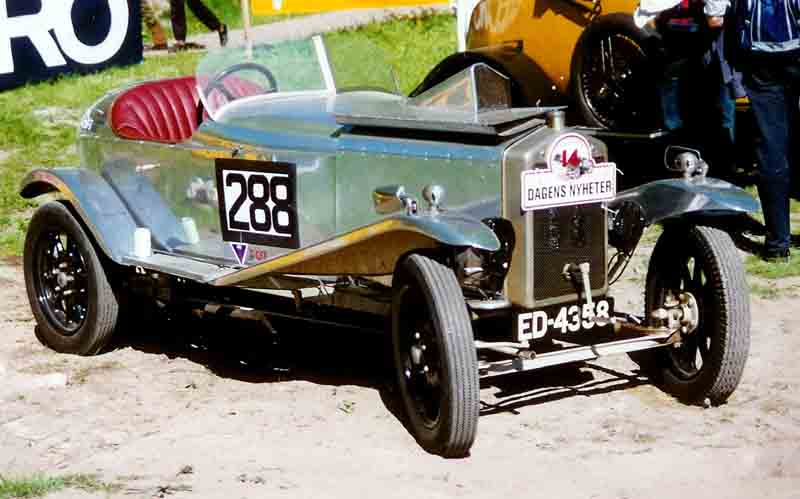
- A.B.C. 12/40 HP Super Sports 1926

Overview
- Production: 1920–27; 1500 approx produced

Body and chassis
- Body style: 2-seat convertible

Powertrain
- Engine: 1198 or 1320 cc air-cooled Overhead valve
- Transmission: four speed manual

Dimensions
- Wheelbase: 102 in (2,591 mm)
- Length: 144 in (3,658 mm)
- Width: 57 in (1,448 mm)

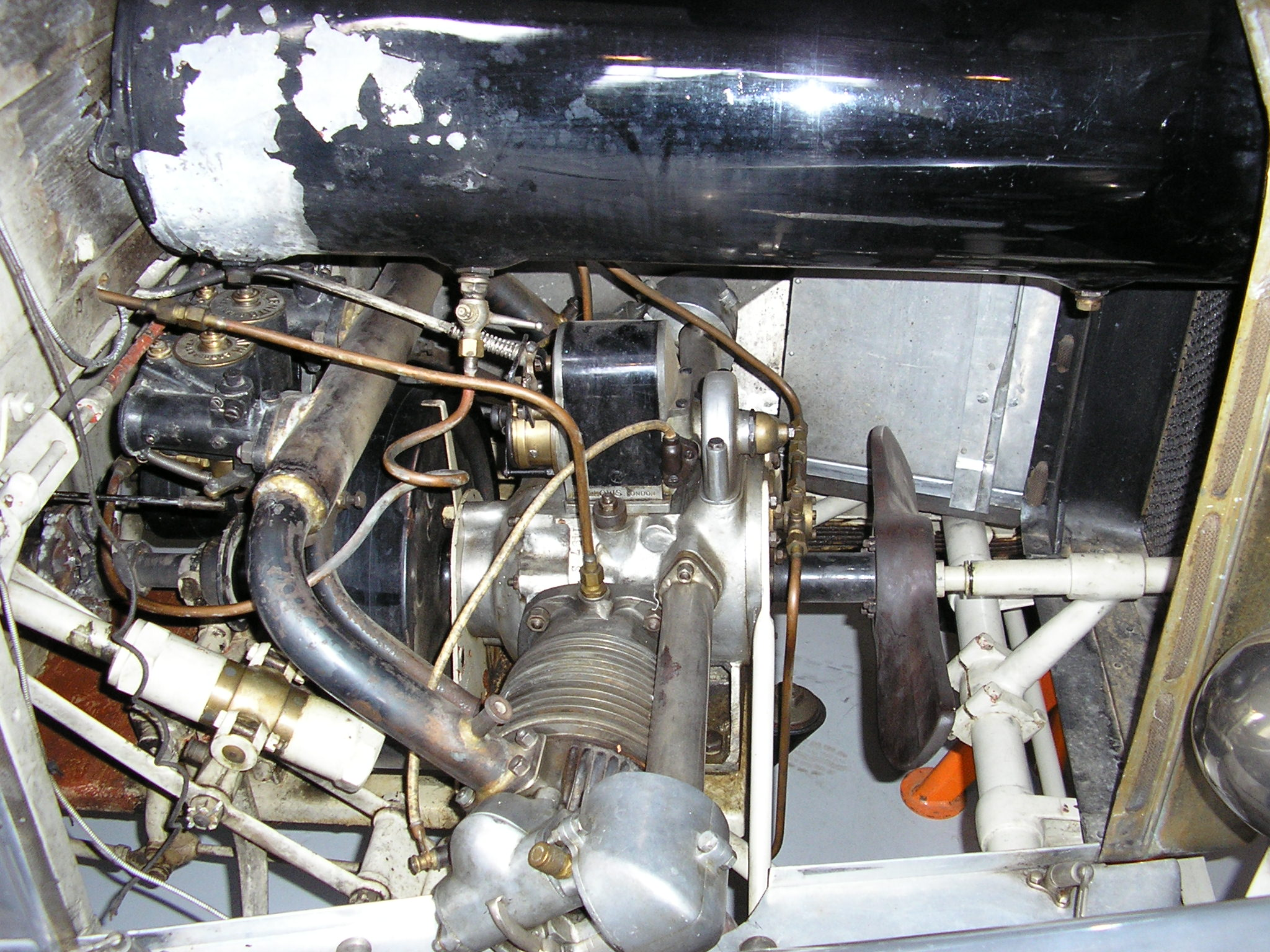
Engine in a 1926 ABC Super Sports.

The ABC was an English car manufactured between 1920 and 1929 by ABC Motors.

It was a light car (305 kg), powered by a 1198 cc flat-twin, air-cooled engine designed by Granville Bradshaw (the man who was also responsible for the ABC Motorcycle). The engine however was difficult to start, loud, inefficiently lubricated, and prone to breakages, particularly the quite long, exposed push rods. Over time quality improved dramatically. Combined with the vehicle's light weight, the powerplant made the car quite fast for its size, capable of speeds approaching 60 miles per hour (97 km/h), and boasting quite good acceleration. ABC was originally part of the Harper Bean combine, and was based in Hersham, Surrey and Harper Bean supplied castings, stampings, and forgings utilized on the first ABCs. The car was expensive; in 1920 it sold for £414 but came down to £265 for a four seater in 1923.

The "radiator" cap was actually the fuel tank filler, which led to problems when mechanics unfamiliar with air-cooled cars topped off the fuel tank with water.

In 1925 a more refined version came featuring stronger valve gear, a better system of lubrication, and enclosed pushrods. Front-wheel brakes became an option.

The company introduced a Super Sports model in 1925 with a 1320 cc engine. This was the only model offered for the last four years of ABC's production.

Today the ABC is fairly rare and can be seen at shows and events around England.

== See also ==
- List of car manufacturers of the United Kingdom
