= 1AD =

1AD may refer to:

- The year 1 AD
- First Assistant Director, a role in the film industry
- 1st Armored Division (United States), an armored division of the United States Army

== See also ==
- 1 (disambiguation)
- AD (disambiguation)
- AD 1
