= J.V. Martin K.III Kitten =

Experimental American fighter aircraft

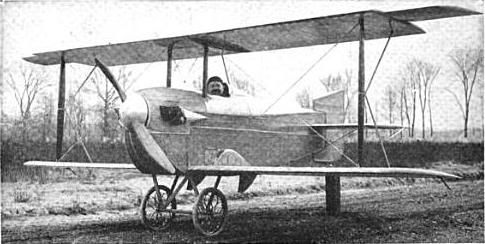

General information
- Type: Interceptor
- National origin: United States of America
- Designer: James V. Martin

History
- Introduction date: 1919

The J.V. Martin K.III Kitten, also known as the J.V. Martin K.III Scout, was marketed as an "altitude fighter" for the U.S. Army. It is considered the first aircraft in the United States with retractable landing gear.

== Design and development ==
James V. Martin was a consultant to the U.S. Air service, and an associate to General Billy Mitchell. He held patents on aerospace technologies including the retractable landing gear and once held the World's speed record of 70 mph in an airplane. The Kitten design was too late for the war effort, it could not go into production before the end of World War I.

The aircraft featured manual retractable landing gear. The wheels used flexible spokes for shock absorption. When viewed from the side, the wing supports formed a letter "K" shape. The fuselage was all wood with plywood and fabric covering. The aircraft featured air tanks, and electrical power for flightsuit heating.

== Operational history ==
In 1918, the aircraft was delivered to McCook Field where it was considered structurally unsound. Martin appealed to Congress in 1920 to no avail. In 60 test flights at Dayton, Ohio, the high altitude aircraft could only reach 295 ft of altitude. The prototype K.III Kitten was donated to the National Air and Space Museum in 1924.

== Variants ==
The J.V. Martin K.IV was a model III with a more powerful 60 hp Lawrance engine and floats. 3 were built and sold to the U.S. Navy.

== Specifications ==
Data from EAA

General characteristics

- Capacity: 1
- Length: 13 ft 3 in (4.04 m)
- Wingspan: 20 ft 2 in (6.15 m)
- Height: 7 ft 4 in (2.24 m)
- Wing area: 105 sq ft (9.8 m^{2})
- Empty weight: 350 lb (159 kg)
- Fuel capacity: 9 US gallons (34 litres)
- Powerplant: 1 × ABC Gnat 2 cylinder, 45 hp (34 kW)

Performance

- Maximum speed: 117 kn (135 mph, 217 km/h)
