= Martin KF-1 =

KF-1

General information
- Type: fighter
- National origin: United States
- Designer: James V. Martin
- Number built: 4 (1 K-3 prototype, 3 K-IV)

History
- First flight: May 1918

The Martin KF-1 was an American biplane fighter aircraft designed and built by Captain James V. Martin.

== Development ==
The KF-1 started as a proposed "high-altitude fighter" designated the K.III. Powered by an ABC Gnat the K-3 first flew in May 1918, and was delivered to McCook Field the next month. The model was not ordered for production.

In 1921 Martin submitted an improved version with a larger engine and wider wings. The Navy ordered three, designated K-IV, then later KF-1. The version featured a central float and outriggers.

== Variants ==
- J.V. Martin K.III Kitten the 45 hp prototype the KF-1 is based on.

== Specifications (KF-1) ==
Data from Angelucci, 1987. p. 293.

General characteristics

- Crew: 1
- Length: 17 ft 0 in (5.18 m)
- Wingspan: 24 ft 2 in (7.36 m)
- Wing area: 145 sq ft (13.47 m^{2})
- Empty weight: 686 lb (311 kg)
- Gross weight: 980 lb (444 kg)
- Powerplant: 1 × Lawrance L-3 , 60 hp (45 kW)

Performance

- Maximum speed: 98 mph (158 km/h, 85 kn)
- Service ceiling: 11,400 ft (3,475 m)
- Rate of climb: 417 ft/min (2.12 m/s)

== See also ==
Aircraft of comparable role, configuration, and era Port Victoria P.V.8 "Kitten"

== Bibliography ==
- Angelucci, Enzo (1987). The American Fighter from 1917 to the present. New York: Orion Books.
- Passingham, Malcolm (February 2000). "Les hydravions embarqués sur sous-marins" [Submarine-carried Seaplanes]. Avions: Toute l'aéronautique et son histoire (in French) (83): 7–17. ISSN 1243-8650.
