= Southern Martlet =

British sport aircraft

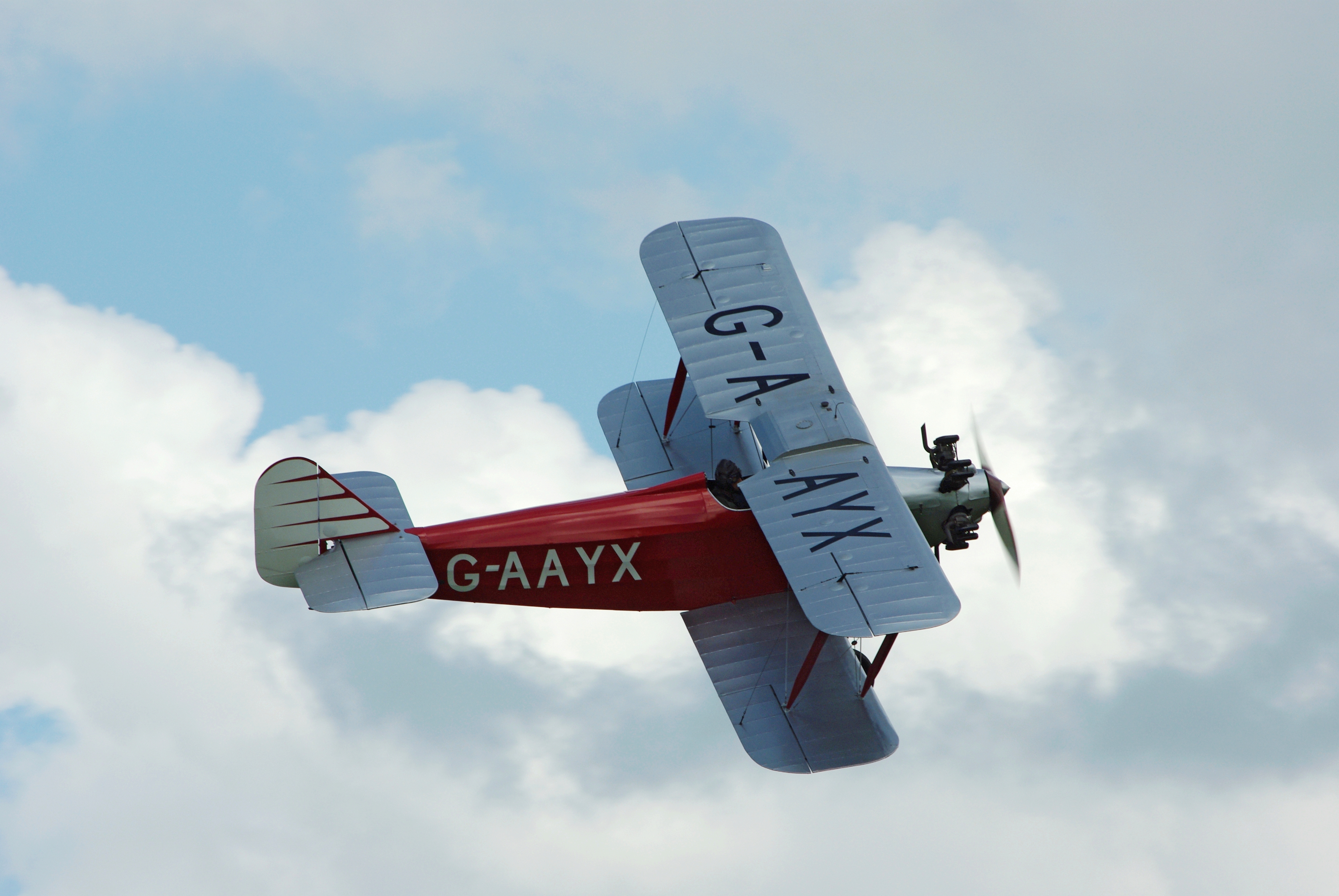
- The Shuttleworth Trust's Martlet

General information
- Type: single-seat sports biplane
- National origin: United Kingdom
- Manufacturer: Southern Aircraft Company
- Designer: F.G Miles
- Number built: 6

History
- First flight: 1929
- Developed from: Avro Baby

The Southern Martlet was a single-engined, single-seat biplane sports aircraft. Six were built, including the rather different and unsuccessful Metal Martlet.

== Design and development ==
The Southern Martlet was the first aircraft designed by teams led Frederick George Miles, whose company was Southern Aircraft of Shoreham. It was a modified Avro Baby, differing in the tail unit, undercarriage and engine, the 85 hp A.B.C. Hornet air-cooled flat four. Like the Baby, it was a single-bay staggered tractor biplane, with fixed two-wheel main and tail-skid undercarriage. The undercarriage was a combination of "oleo and coil-spring shock absorbing gear" designed by Basil Henderson of Hendy Aircraft, Shoreham. The prototype G-AAII made its first public appearance on 30 August 1929 at London Air Park, Hanworth, and proved to be a very manoeuvrable sports machine.

== Operational history ==
Five production aircraft were built at Shoreham, differing chiefly in the choice of engine. Three of them had 80 hp Armstrong Siddeley Genet II and one a 100 hp Armstrong Siddeley Genet Major. These were five-cylinder uncowled radials. One aircraft had, at different times, a de Havilland Gipsy I or II (100 hp and 120 hp respectively), upright in-line air-cooled engines.

The Martlets were not very successful as racers but served a succession of private owners as aerobatic mounts.

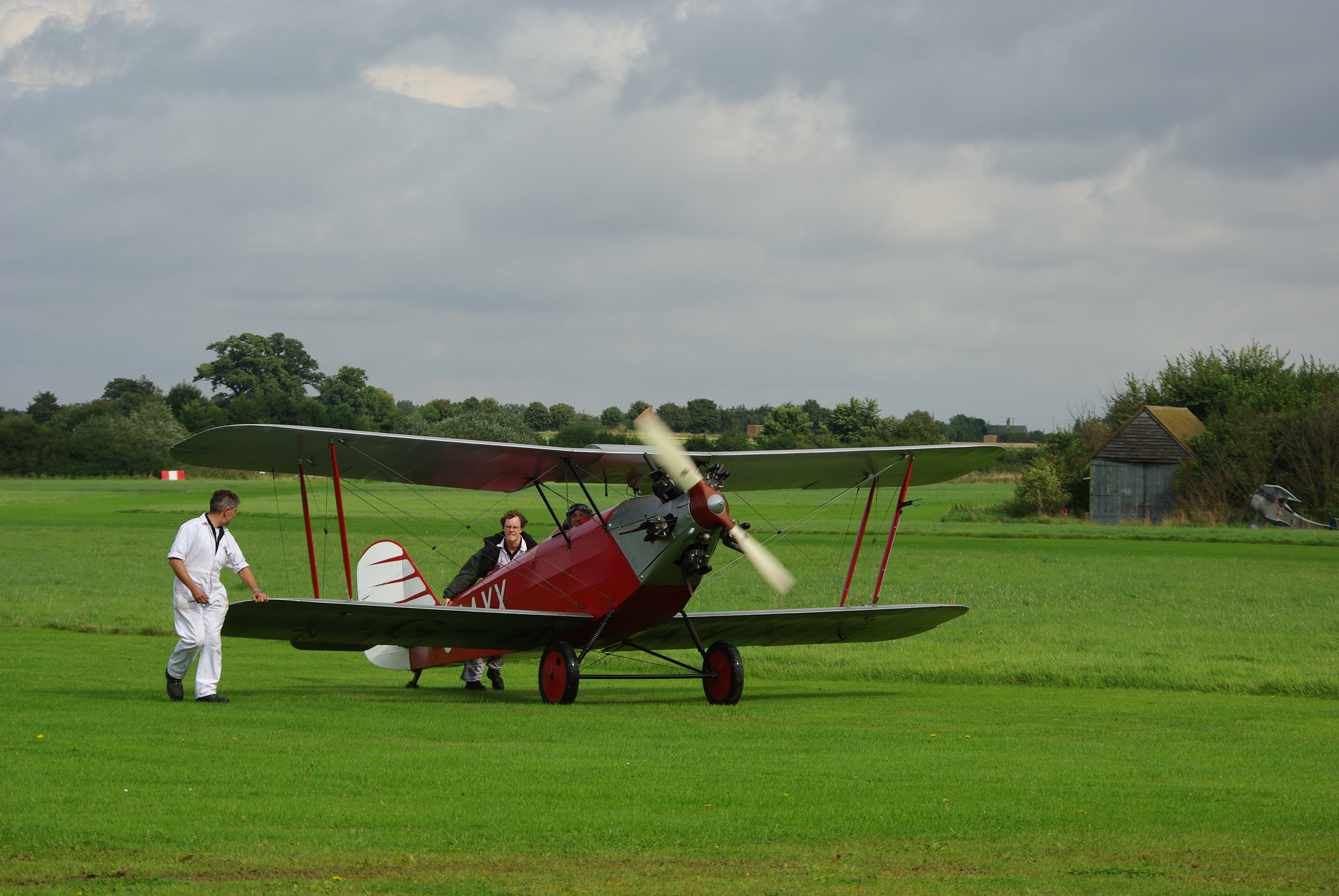
Shuttleworth's Martlet at Old Warden

Only one Martlet, the Genet Major engined G-AAYX survived the war. This aircraft was owned for a number of years by F G Miles who used it as a personal mount while based at Woodley near Reading. The aircraft is now part of The Shuttleworth Collection based at Old Warden Aerodrome and underwent an extensive restoration, with return to flight in September 2000. The aircraft is now on permanent display as part of The Collection and is flown at home air displays during the summer months.

== Variants ==
Data from: British civil aircraft, 1919-1972 Volume III

200 (G-AAII)
Prototype first flew with an ABC Hornet later fitted with an 85 hp Armstrong-Siddeley Genet II engine.
201 (G-AAVD)
First production aircraft with a Genet II engine.
202 (G-AAYX)
Second production aircraft with an Armstrong-Siddeley Genet Major engine and untapered ailerons. Later operated by Butlins and now remains airworthy with the Shuttleworth Trust.
203 (G-AAYZ)
Third Production aircraft with a de Havilland Gipsy II engine built for F.E. Guest.
204 (G-ABBN)
Fourth production aircraft with a Genet II engine built for the Marquess of Douglas and Clydesdale.
205 (G-ABIF)
Fifth production aircraft with a Genet II engine for Miss Maxine Freeman-Thomas (who later became Mrs F.G. Miles).
Metal Martlet
The Metal Martlet, despite its name had little in common with the Martlet. One completed, not a success and a second aircraft was not completed.

== Specifications (Genet II) ==
Data from British civil aircraft, 1919-1972 Volume III

General characteristics

- Crew: 1
- Length: 20 ft 3 in (6.17 m)
- Wingspan: 25 ft 0 in (7.62 m)
- Height: 7 ft 7 in (2.31 m)
- Wing area: 180 sq ft (17 m^{2})
- Empty weight: 705 lb (320 kg)
- Gross weight: 1,030 lb (467 kg)
- Powerplant: 1 × Armstrong Siddeley Genet II 5-cylinder air-cooled radial piston engine, 80 hp (60 kW)
- Propellers: 2-bladed fixed-pitch propeller

Performance

- Maximum speed: 113 mph (182 km/h, 98 kn)
- Cruise speed: 96 mph (154 km/h, 83 kn)
- Range: 280 mi (450 km, 240 nmi)
- Rate of climb: 1,100 ft/min (5.6 m/s)
