= AD 1 =

AD 1 or AD-1 may refer to:

- Year 1 anno Domini in the Julian calendar
- AD.1 or AD Seaplane Type 1000, a British seaplane of the First World War
- Airship Development AD1, a British non-rigid gas-filled advertising airship, 1929–1931
- Douglas AD-1 Skyraider, an attack aircraft developed in the 1940s
- NASA AD-1, an oblique-wing research aircraft developed in the 1970s
- AD1, a fictional masculinist brotherhood in St Trinian's 2: The Legend of Fritton's Gold
- AD-1 experiment, an antimatter research project
- AD-1 Inferno, a jet-powered interceptor developed by Helsing
