= ABC Scorpion =

1920s British piston aircraft engine

Scorpion
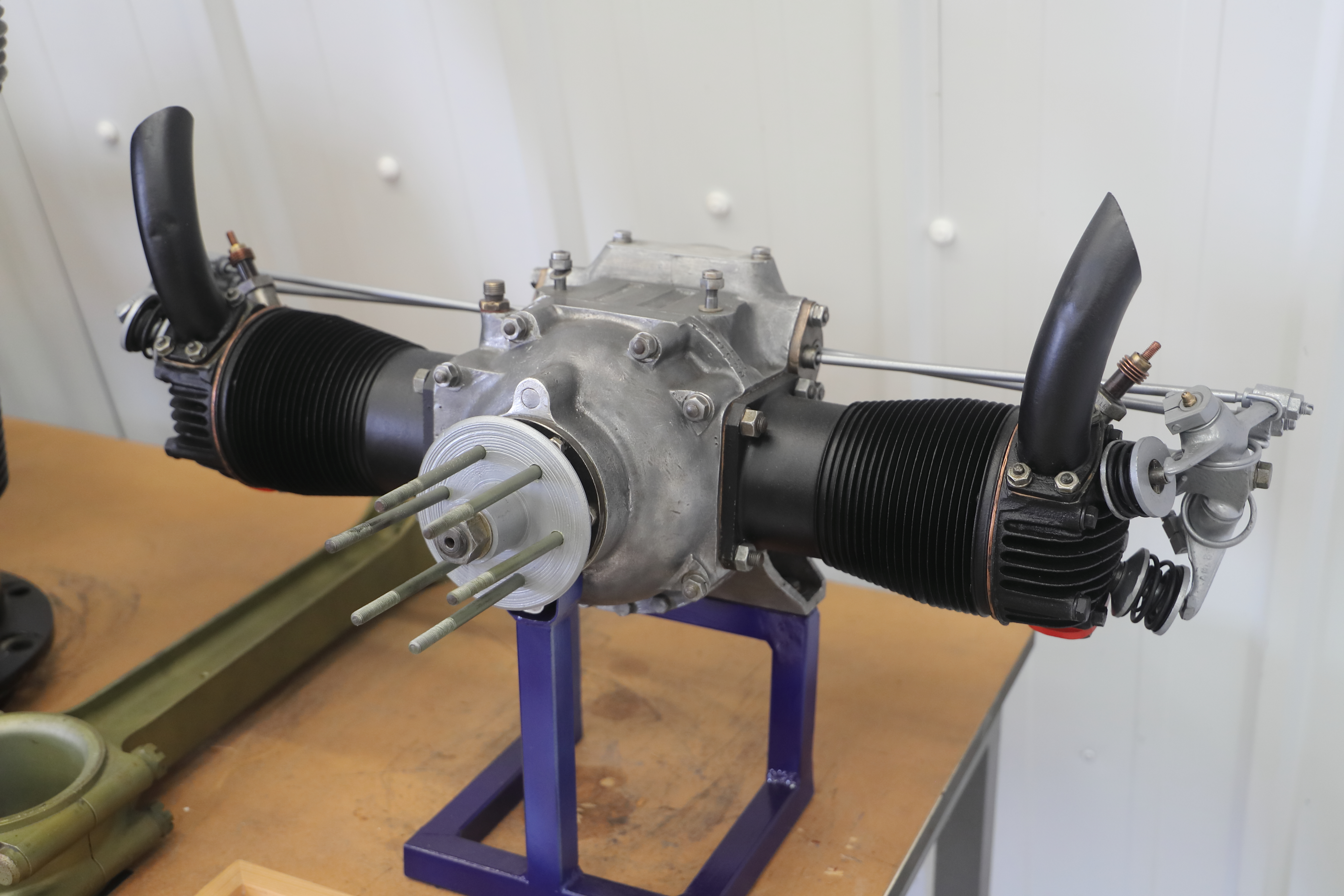
- ABC Scorpion I on display at the Shuttleworth Collection
- Type: Flat-twin aero engine
- National origin: United Kingdom
- Manufacturer: ABC Motors
- Designer: Granville Bradshaw
- First run: 1921

The ABC Scorpion is a 30 hp (22 kW) two-cylinder aero engine designed by British engineer Granville Bradshaw for use in light aircraft. The engine was built by ABC Motors Limited and first ran in 1921.

== Variants ==
Scorpion I
1923, 30 hp (22 kW)
Scorpion II
1924, 34 hp (25 kW), increased bore and stroke.

== Applications ==
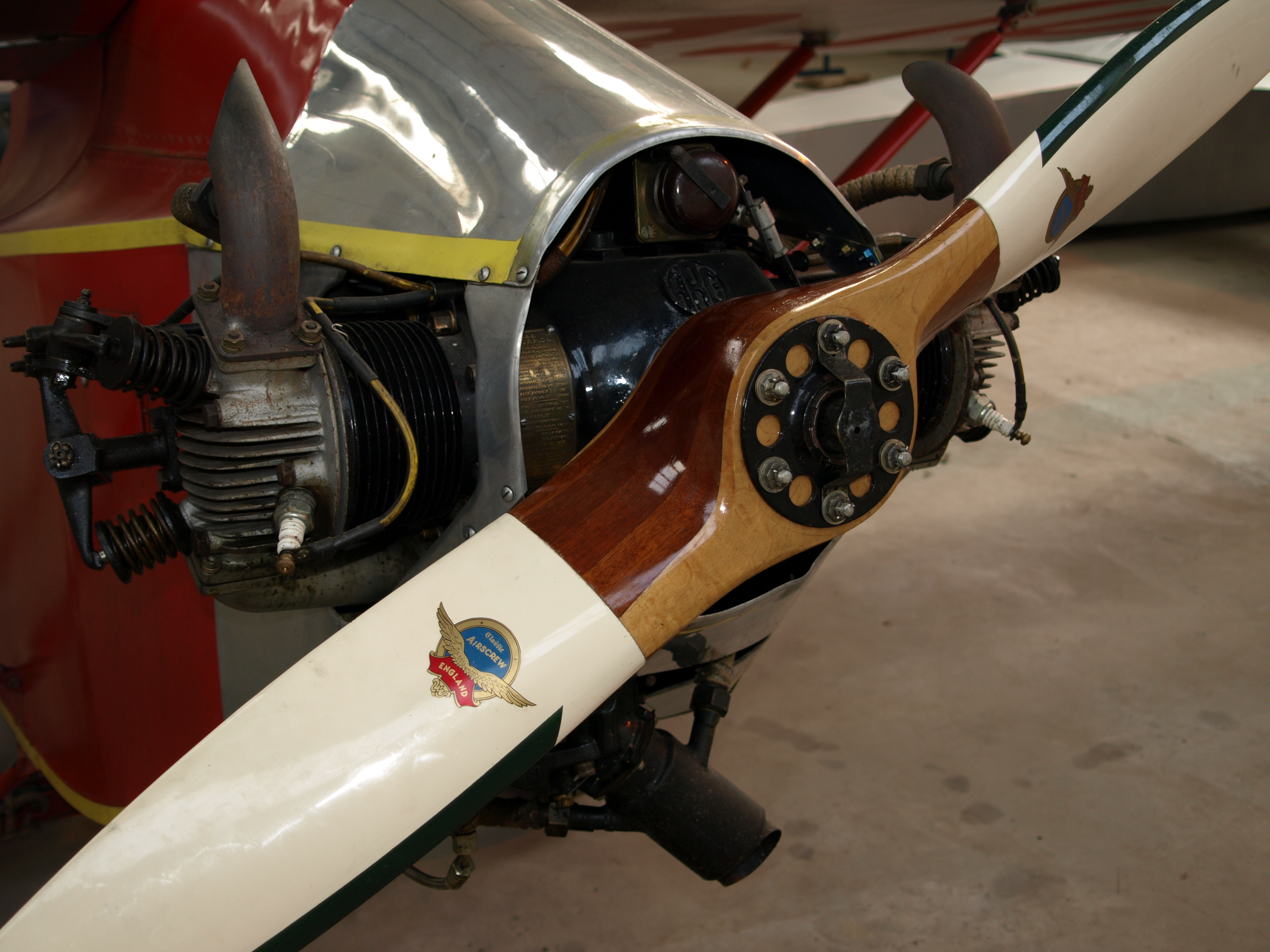
Scorpion II installed in an ANEC II at the Shuttleworth Collection

- ABC Robin
- Boulton Paul Phoenix
- BFW M.19
- BFW M.23
- Comper Swift
- de Havilland Humming Bird
- Farman Moustique
- Hawker Cygnet
- Heath Parasol
- Hendy Hobo
- Henderson-Glenny Gadfly
- Kay Gyroplane
- Luton Minor
- Mignet HM.14 Pou-du-Ciel
- Parmentier Wee Mite
- Peyret-Mauboussin PM X
- RWD 1
- SAI KZ I
- Saynor & Bell Canadian Cub
- Short Satellite
- Snyder Buzzard
- Udet U 7 Kolibri
- Wheeler Slymph
- Westland Woodpigeon

== Survivors ==
The only ANEC II (G-EBJO) flies regularly at the Shuttleworth Collection at Old Warden and is powered by a Scorpion II.

== Specifications (Scorpion I) ==
Data from Lumsden

=== General characteristics ===
- Type: 2 cylinder air cooled flat-twin
- Bore: 3.6 in (87.5 mm)
- Stroke: 3.7 in (91.5 mm)
- Displacement: 73.32 cu in (1.1 L)
- Dry weight: 90 lb (41 kg)

=== Components ===
- Valvetrain: Overhead valve, two valves per cylinder
- Fuel system: Carburettor
- Fuel type: 74 Octane petrol
- Cooling system: Air

=== Performance ===
- Power output: 30 hp (22 kW) at 2,750 rpm
- Compression ratio: 4:1
- Power-to-weight ratio: 0.33 hp/lb (0.53 kW/kg)

== See also ==
Comparable engines

- Aeronca E-113
- Armstrong Siddeley Ounce
- Bristol Cherub
- Haacke HFM-2
- Walter Atom

Related lists

- List of aircraft engines
