= ABC Motors =

Manufacturer of cars, aircraft, motor scooters, and engines

- Industry: Engineering
- Founded: 1912
- Defunct: 1951
- Fate: Absorbed into Vickers
- Headquarters: Hersham, Surrey, England
- Key people: Ronald Charteris (Founder); Granville Bradshaw (Designer)
- Products: Cars, motorcycles and aero engines

ABC Motors Limited ("All British (Engine) Company") of Hersham, Surrey, England was a manufacturer of cars, aircraft, motor scooters, and engines for road and air. Established by Ronald Charteris in Hersham, Surrey in 1912, its chief designer was the young and talented Granville Bradshaw. It was absorbed into Vickers in 1951 and the factory finally closed in the 1970s. Last occupied by Ian Allan Publishing as Hersham's Riverdene Industrial Estate, the factory was demolished around 2017-2018 and redeveloped as a Lidl supermarket (opened February 2019) with flats above.

== Products ==
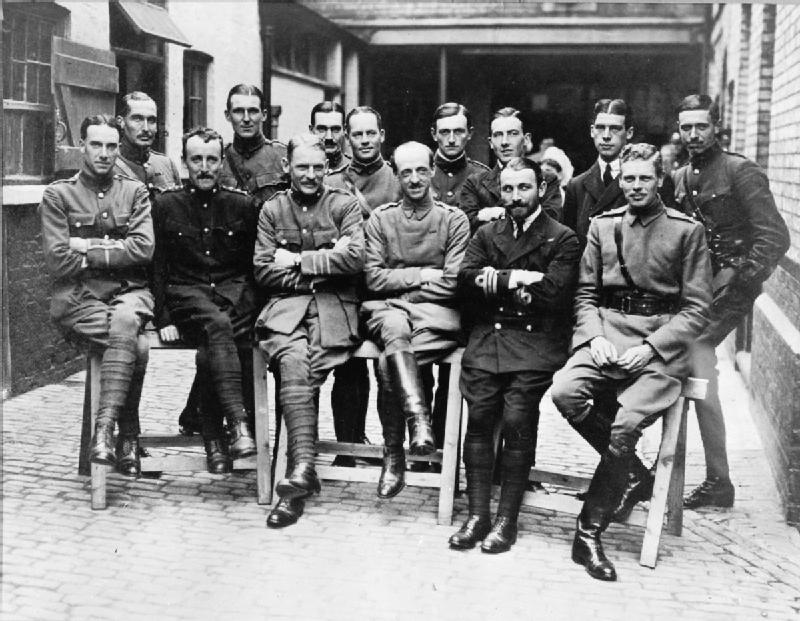
Lt. Ronald Charteris (7th from left, standing) with fellow officers of the Royal Flying Corps c 1913

The ABC radial aero engines of the World War I period were extremely advanced for their time, and were initially thought to be very promising indeed. Unfortunately they were all more or less plagued by problems – and although a number of types for the Royal Air Force were designed around ABC engines (especially the ill-fated Dragonfly) none saw squadron service with the RAF.

ABC also made a large number of engines for electrical generators and other purposes – mostly with a flat twin cylinder layout and unusual exhaust-over-inlet valve configuration. These smaller ABC engines have the distinction of being possibly the first airborne APUs- the Coastal class blimp (first flown in 1916) had a 1.5-horsepower unit installed to provide electricity for the onboard wireless set, whilst a similar engine was used to power the searchlight of the sole Supermarine Nighthawk 'Zeppelin killer' of 1917.

=== Aero engines ===
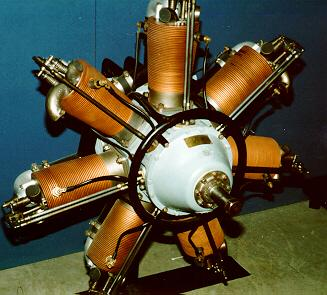
The Wasp engine

- ABC 6 hp Midge (1951) National Archives Kew (AIR 10/7172)
- ABC 8 hp (1923)
- ABC 30 hp (1912)
- ABC 60 hp (1912)
- ABC 100 hp (1912)
- ABC Dragonfly (1918)
- ABC Gadfly (1920)
- ABC Gnat (1916)
- ABC Mosquito (1916)
- ABC Hornet (1929)
- ABC Scorpion (1923)
- ABC Wasp (1918)

=== Aircraft ===
- ABC Robin

=== Automotive ===
- ABC (1920 automobile)
- ABC Supersports
- ABC Skootamota
- ABC motorcycles

== See also ==
- ABC motorcycles

Related lists

- List of aircraft engine manufacturers
