= Port Victoria P.V.7 =

Prototype British Fighter aircraft of the First World War

P.V.7/ Grain Kitten

General information
- Type: Fighter
- Manufacturer: RNAS Marine Experimental Depot, Port Victoria
- Designer: W H Sayers
- Status: Prototype
- Number built: 1

History
- First flight: 22 June 1917

The Port Victoria P.V.7 Grain Kitten was a prototype British Fighter aircraft of the First World War designed and built by the Port Victoria Marine Experimental Aircraft Depot on the Isle of Grain. A very small and light biplane intended to fly off platforms on Royal Navy Destroyers, it was unsuccessful, only a single prototype being built.

== Design and development ==
Following Royal Navy experience in operating land planes from platforms on ships, in late 1916, the British Admiralty came up with the idea of a lightweight fighter aircraft, capable of flying off short platforms on the forecastle of Destroyers in order to provide large numbers of aircraft at sea capable of intercepting and destroying German Airships. It therefore instructed the Marine Aircraft Experimental Department at Port Victoria on the Isle of Grain, and the RNAS Experimental Flight at Eastchurch to each produce a design to meet this requirement.

The Port Victoria aircraft, designed by W.H. Sayers, was designated P.V.7. It was a very small single bay tractor biplane, of sesquiplane configuration, with its lower wing much smaller than its upper wing. The wings featured the same high-lift section as used in previous Port Victoria aircraft, and were fitted with ailerons only on the upper wing. It was intended, as was the competing Eastchurch design, to use a 45 hp (34 kW) geared ABC Gnat two-cylinder air-cooled engine. Armament was a single Lewis gun mounted above the upper wing.

While the Port Victoria design was designed and built, the commander of the Experimental flight as Eastchurch, Harry Busteed took over command of the Port Victoria Marine Aircraft Experimental Department, taking the designer of the Eastchurch competitor and the part built prototype with him to the Isle of Grain, with the Eastchurch design gaining the Port Victoria designation P.V.8. The P.V.7 acquired the name Grain Kitten to distinguish it from the P.V.8, which was named the Eastchurch Kitten.

The P.V.7 first flew on 22 June 1917, powered by a 35 hp (26 kW) ungeared Gnat engine, as the geared engine was unavailable. The P.V.7 proved to be tail heavy in the air and difficult to handle on the ground, with its sesquiplane layout and high lift wings being considered unsuitable for such a small aircraft. The Gnat engine proved to be extremely unreliable, with test flights being forced to remain within gliding distance of an airfield.

When the P.V.8 first flew in September, it proved superior, although similarly hamstrung by the 35 hp Gnat. The P.V.7 was rebuilt with new wings of conventional aerofoil section, a modified tail and a new undercarriage to eliminate some of the problems found in testing. The low power and unreliability of the Gnat, however, prevented either aircraft being suitable for the intended use, and the P.V.7 was not flown after it was rebuilt.

== Specifications ==
Data from War Planes of the First World War: Volume One Fighters

General characteristics

- Crew: One
- Length: 14 ft 11 in (4.55 m)
- Upper wingspan: 18 ft 0 in (5.49 m)
- Lower wingspan: 12 ft 7 in (3.84 m)
- Height: 5 ft 3 in (1.60 m)
- Wing area: 85 sq ft (7.9 m^{2})
- Empty weight: 284 lb (129 kg)
- Gross weight: 491 lb (223 kg)
- Powerplant: 1 × ABC Gnat air cooled two-cylinder horizontally-opposed piston engine, 35 hp (26 kW)

Performance

- Maximum speed: 85 mph (137 km/h, 74 kn) at 6,500 ft (2,000 m)
- Service ceiling: 11,900 ft (3,600 m)
- Time to altitude: 22 min to 10,000 ft (3,000 m)

Armament

- Guns: 1x .303 in Lewis gun above upper wing.

== See also ==
Aircraft of comparable role, configuration, and era

- Port Victoria P.V.8
