= Armstrong Siddeley Genet Major =

1920s British piston aircraft engine

Genet Major/Civet
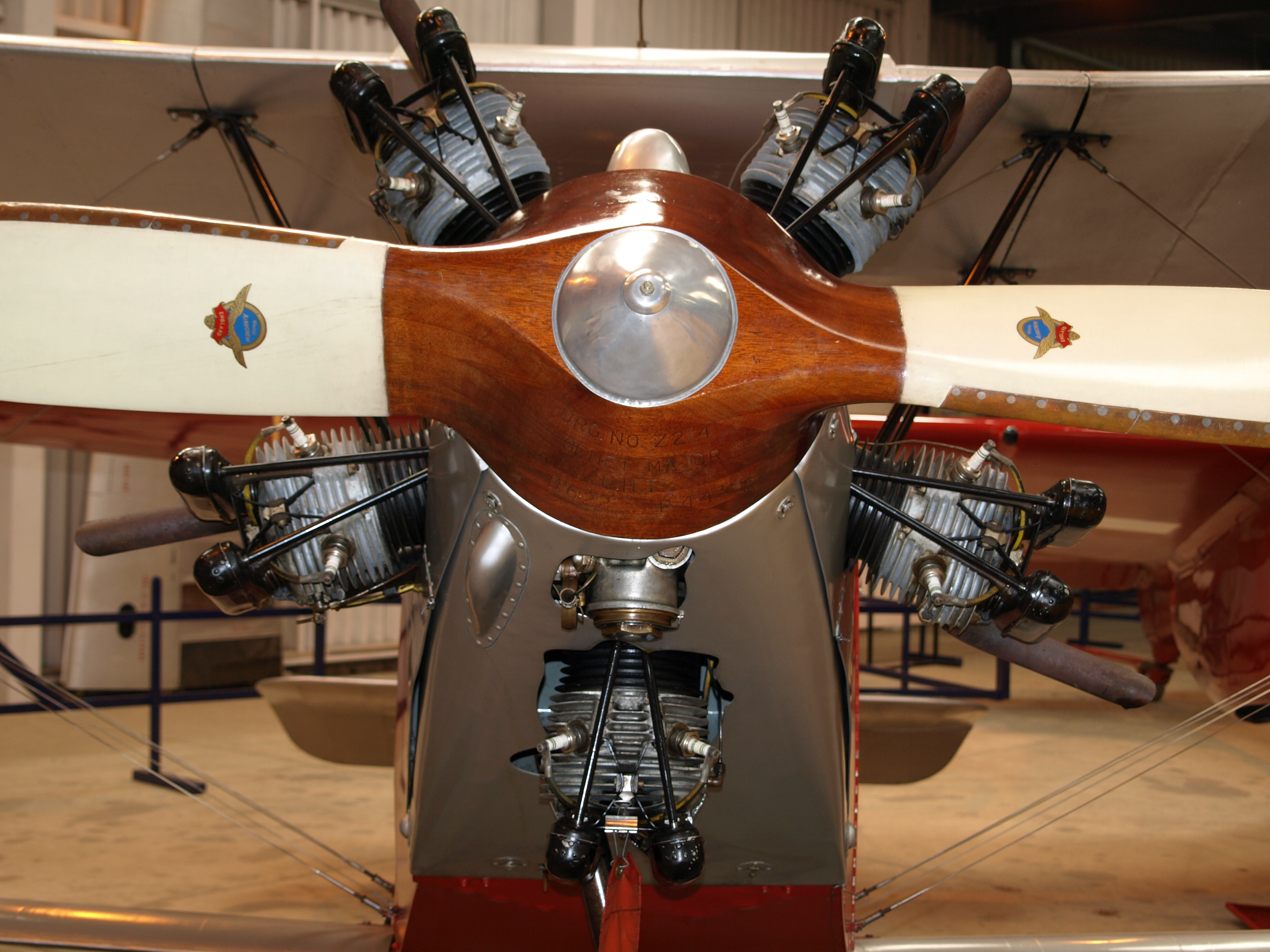
- Genet Major installed in a Southern Martlet at the Shuttleworth Collection
- Type: Radial aero engine
- Manufacturer: Armstrong Siddeley
- First run: 1928
- Developed from: Armstrong Siddeley Genet

The Armstrong Siddeley Genet Major is a British five-cylinder (later seven-cylinder), air-cooled, radial engine for aircraft, designed and built by Armstrong Siddeley and first run in 1928. It developed 140 horsepower (104 kW). In Royal Air Force use the seven-cylinder version was known as the Civet I. The Feliform names used are in line with company convention, the Genet and Civet both being large cat-like carnivores.

== Variants and applications ==
=== Genet Major I ===
The Genet Major 1 was a five-cylinder engine of 105 horsepower (78 kW) that was closely related to the Genet I but with increased bore and stroke.

- Avro Avian
- Avro 619
- Avro 624
- Avro 638 Club Cadet
- Cierva C.19 Autogiro
- Civilian Coupé
- Saro Cutty Sark
- Southern Martlet
- Westland IV

=== Genet Major 1A (Civet I) ===
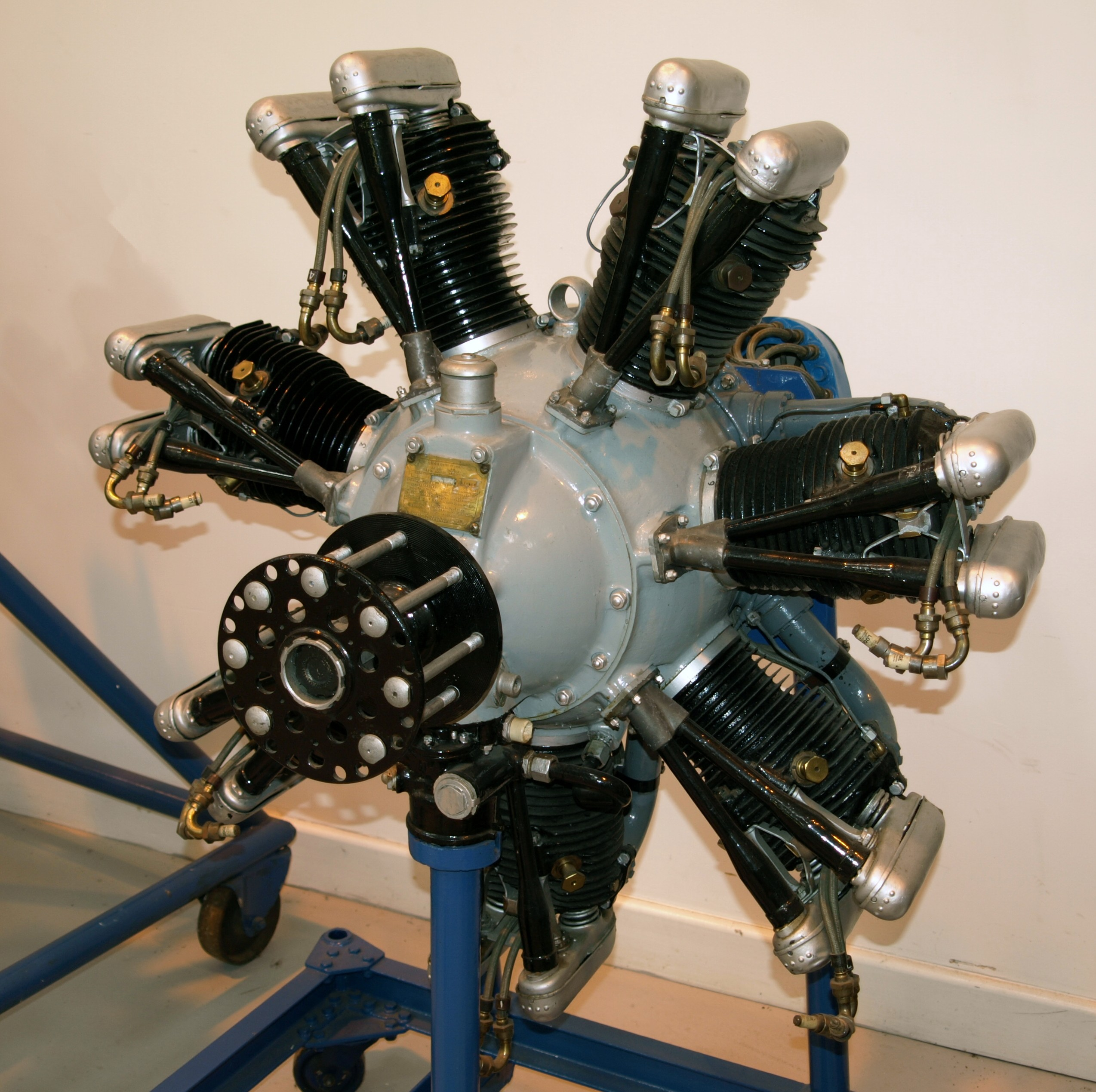
Armstrong Siddeley Civet

Armstrong Siddeley Genet Major IV on display at the Polish Aviation Museum

The Genet Major 1A (or Civet I in RAF service) was a seven-cylinder development of the Genet Major I, nominally rated at 145 horsepower (108 kW).

- ANBO V (upgrade)
- Avro Avian
- Avro Cadet
- Avro Rota
- Cierva C.30A Autogiro
- RWD-6 (not specified 7-cylinder Genet Major sub-type)
- Saro Cutty Sark
- SEA-1
- Westland Wessex

=== Genet Major III ===
As Genet Major IA but with cylinders using cast rocker boxes.

=== Genet Major IV ===
A geared propeller drive version of the Genet Major IA, 160 horsepower (120 kW).

- ANBO 51

== Surviving engines ==
An Armstrong Siddeley Genet Major powers Southern Martlet (G-AAYX) which is owned and operated by the Shuttleworth Collection at Old Warden and flies at home air displays throughout the summer months. An Armstrong Siddeley Genet Major 1A engine also powers the only surviving Civilian Aircraft Co.Ltd. 1931 vintage Civilian Coupe 02 monoplane (G-ABNT), which is airworthy and owned and operated by Shipping and Airlines Ltd based at Biggin Hill Airport, England.

== Engines on display ==
- An Armstrong Siddeley Genet Major IA is on display at the Royal Air Force Museum Cosford.
- An Armstrong Siddeley Genet Major IV can be seen in Polish Aviation Museum in Kraków.
- Aviation Heritage Museum (Western Australia)

== Specifications (Genet Major IA/Civet I) ==
Data from Lumsden

=== General characteristics ===
- Type: 7-cylinder single-row radial piston engine
- Bore: 4.25 in (107.95 mm)
- Stroke: 4.5 in (114.3 mm)
- Displacement: 452.01 cu in (7.3 L)
- Length: 38.8 in (985.5 mm)
- Diameter: 38.15 in (970 mm)
- Dry weight: 327 lb (148 kg)

=== Components ===
- Valvetrain: Overhead poppet valves
- Fuel type: 77 Octane petrol
- Cooling system: Air-cooled
- Reduction gear: Direct drive, Left hand tractor

=== Performance ===
- Power output: 165 hp (123 kW) at 2,425 rpm at sea level
- Compression ratio: 5:1
- Power-to-weight ratio: 0.5 hp/lb

== See also ==
Related development

- Armstrong Siddeley Genet

Comparable engines

- Warner Scarab

Related lists

- List of aircraft engines
