= Avro 643 Cadet =

Avro training aircraft

Cadet
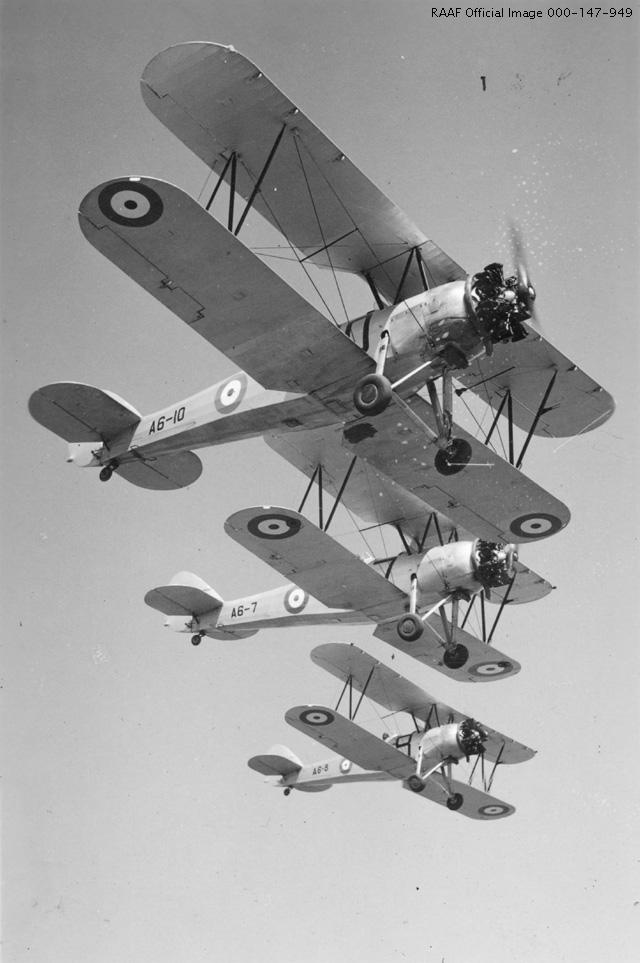
- RAAF Avro Cadets

General information
- Type: Trainer
- Manufacturer: Avro
- Number built: 104

History
- Manufactured: 1932–1939
- Introduction date: 1932
- First flight: October 1931
- Developed from: Avro Tutor
- Variant: Avro 638 Club Cadet

The Avro Cadet is a single-engined British biplane trainer designed and built by Avro in the 1930s as a smaller development of the Avro Tutor for civil use.

== Design and development ==
The Avro 631 Cadet was developed in 1931 as a smaller, more economical, derivative of the Tutor military trainer, for flying club or personal use. The first prototype, G-ABRS flew in October 1931. It was publicly unveiled at the opening of Skegness airfield in May 1932, although by this time, the first orders for the type, for the Irish Army Air Corps, had already been placed and the order (for six Cadets) delivered.

The Avro 631 Cadet was replaced in production in September 1934 by the improved Avro 643 Cadet, which had a revised rear fuselage with a raised rear seat, retaining the 135 hp (101 kW) Armstrong Siddeley Genet Major 1 engine of the Avro 631. In turn, this formed the basis for the more powerful Avro 643 Mk II Cadet; it was also strengthened and had improved parachute egress. This model entered service in 1935, and was built in the largest numbers, including 34 fitted with a tailwheel for the Royal Australian Air Force.

== Operational history ==
The Cadet, while smaller and more economical than the Tutor, was still more expensive to run than competing two-seat light civil aircraft and was harder to hangar because of its lack of folding wings, so it was used mainly as a trainer for flying schools or the military. By far, the largest civil user was Air Service Training Ltd, which operated 17 Avro 631s at Hamble, together with a further four operated by its Hong Kong subsidiary, the Far East Aviation Co. Air Service Training also operated 23 Mk II Cadets, with both these and the earlier Cadets remaining in service with Reserve Training Schools run by Air Service Training until they were impressed as ATC instructional airframes in 1941.

The other major operator was the RAAF, which acquired 34 Mk II Cadets, delivered between November 1935 and February 1939. These remained in service until 1946, when the surviving 16 were sold for civil use. Two of these were re-engined in 1963 with 220 hp (160 kW) Jacobs R-755 engines for use as crop sprayers. In the UK, only two Cadets survived the war.

== Variants ==
Avro 631 Cadet
Initial version, powered by Armstrong Siddeley Genet Major I engine, 35 built.
Avro 643 Cadet
Raised rear seat, eight built.
Avro 643 Cadet II
Powered by 150 hp (110 kW) Genet Major 1A, 61 built.

== Operators ==
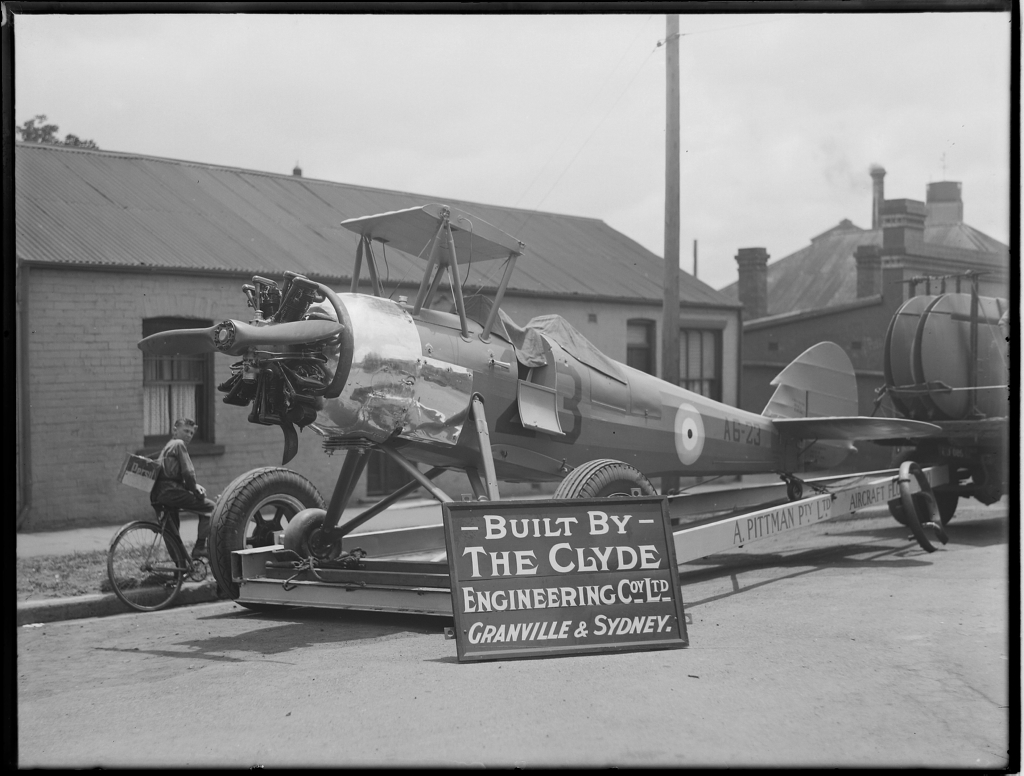
An RAAF Avro Mk II Cadet built in Manchester, UK (despite the signboard) and erected in Australia

=== Civil operators ===
United Kingdom

- Air Service Training Ltd

=== Military operators ===
Australia

- Royal Australian Air Force operated 34 Avro 643 MkII Cadet.

Ireland

- Irish Air Corps operated seven Avro 631 Cadets.

Portugal

- Portuguese Air Force

China

- Chinese Nationalist Air Force – China had five Avro 631 deployed at Liuzhou Aviation School during the Second Sino-Japanese War, all of which were lost due to Japanese bombing in 1939.

Spain

- Spanish Republican Air Force

== Survivors ==
- There are three Cadets flying in Australia (VH-AEJ, VH-AGH and VH-PRT)
- There is one in Ireland (the last of the Irish Air Corps machines, though home after a long tour of duty via the U.K. and New Zealand as ZK-AVR)
- One reputed airworthy Cadet is on display in the Museu do Ar, Portugal.
- A former Australian Air Force A6-25 is airworthy as NX643AV at Kermit Weeks' Fantasy of Flight in Polk City, Florida.
- A former Australian Air Force A6-34, ex VH-RUO, is on static display at the RAAF Museum in Point Cook.

== Specifications (Avro 643 Mk II Cadet) ==
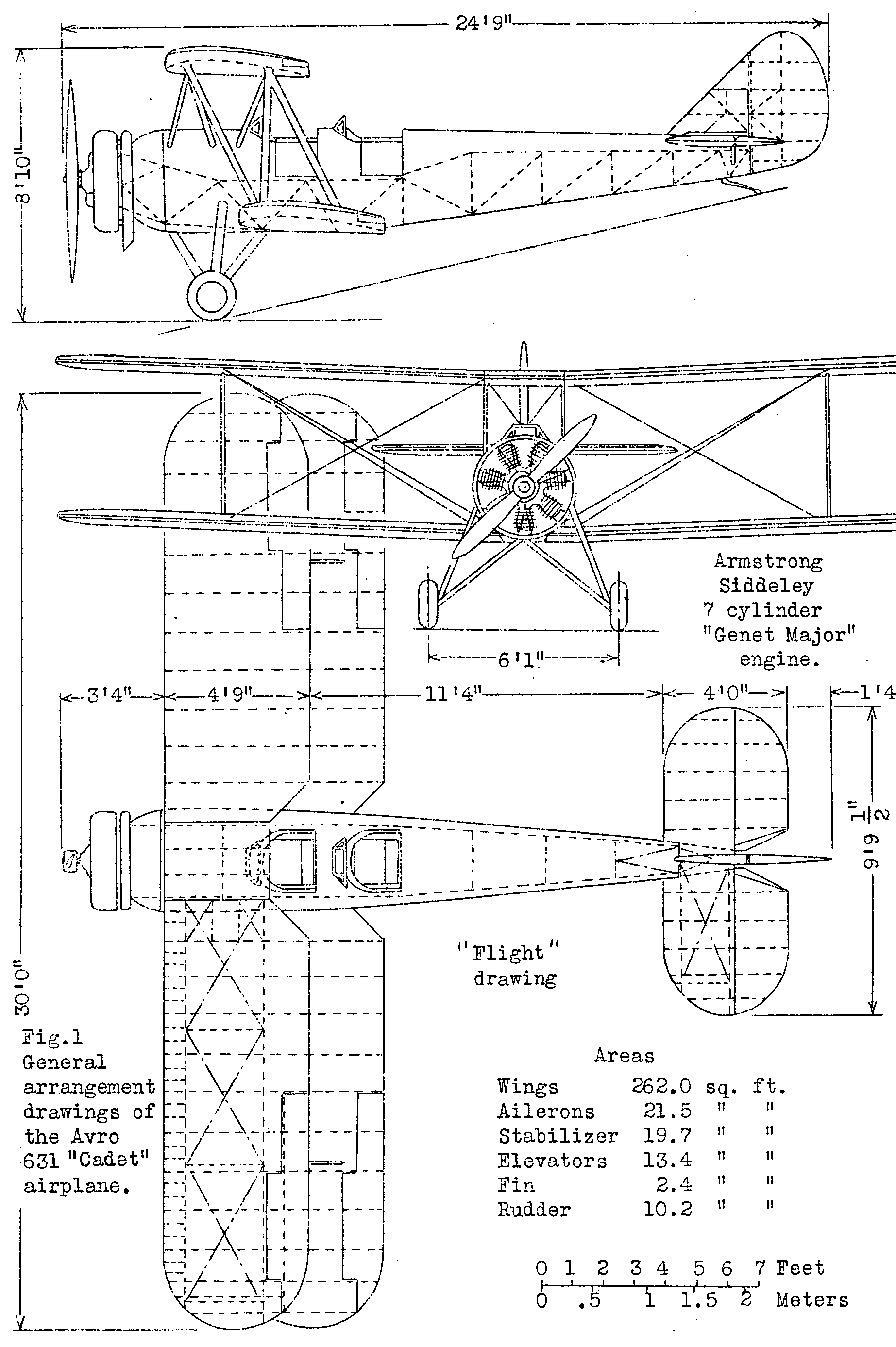
Avro 631 Cadet 3-view drawing from NACA-AC-161

Data from Avro Aircraft since 1908

General characteristics

- Crew: 2
- Length: 24 ft 9 in (7.54 m)
- Wingspan: 30 ft 2 in (9.19 m)
- Height: 8 ft 10 in (2.69 m)
- Empty weight: 1,286 lb (583 kg)
- Gross weight: 2,000 lb (907 kg)
- Powerplant: 1 × Armstrong Siddeley Genet Major 1A 5-cylinder air-cooled radial piston engine, 150 hp (110 kW)
- Propellers: 2-bladed fixed-pitch propeller

Performance

- Maximum speed: 116 mph (187 km/h, 101 kn)
- Cruise speed: 100 mph (160 km/h, 87 kn)
- Range: 325 mi (523 km, 282 nmi)
- Service ceiling: 12,000 ft (3,700 m)
- Rate of climb: 700 ft/min (3.6 m/s)
- Wing loading: 7.63 lb/sq ft (37.3 kg/m^{2})
- Power/mass: 0.075 hp/lb (0.123 kW/kg)

== See also ==
Related development

- Avro Tutor: Cadet developed from this
- Avro 638 Club Cadet: developed Cadet with folding wings

Related lists

- List of Interwar military aircraft
- List of aircraft of the Spanish Republican Air Force

== Bibliography ==
- Lopes, Mario C. (January 2000). "Les avions Avro au Portugal: des inconnu aux plus célèbres" [Portuguese Avro Aircraft: From the Unknown to the Most Famous]. Avions: Toute l'Aéronautique et Son Histoire (in French) (82): 28–33. ISSN 1243-8650.
