= Sopwith Sparrow =

British WW1 era aircraft

The Sopwith Sparrow was a manned light aircraft developed from the Sopwith A.T. (Aerial Target) drone and was powered by a 35 hp (26 kW) ABC Gnat engine.
