= Belsize Motors =

English automobile manufacturer

- Founded: 1897
- Defunct: 1925
- Fate: Receivership and closure
- Successor: none
- Headquarters: Manchester, England

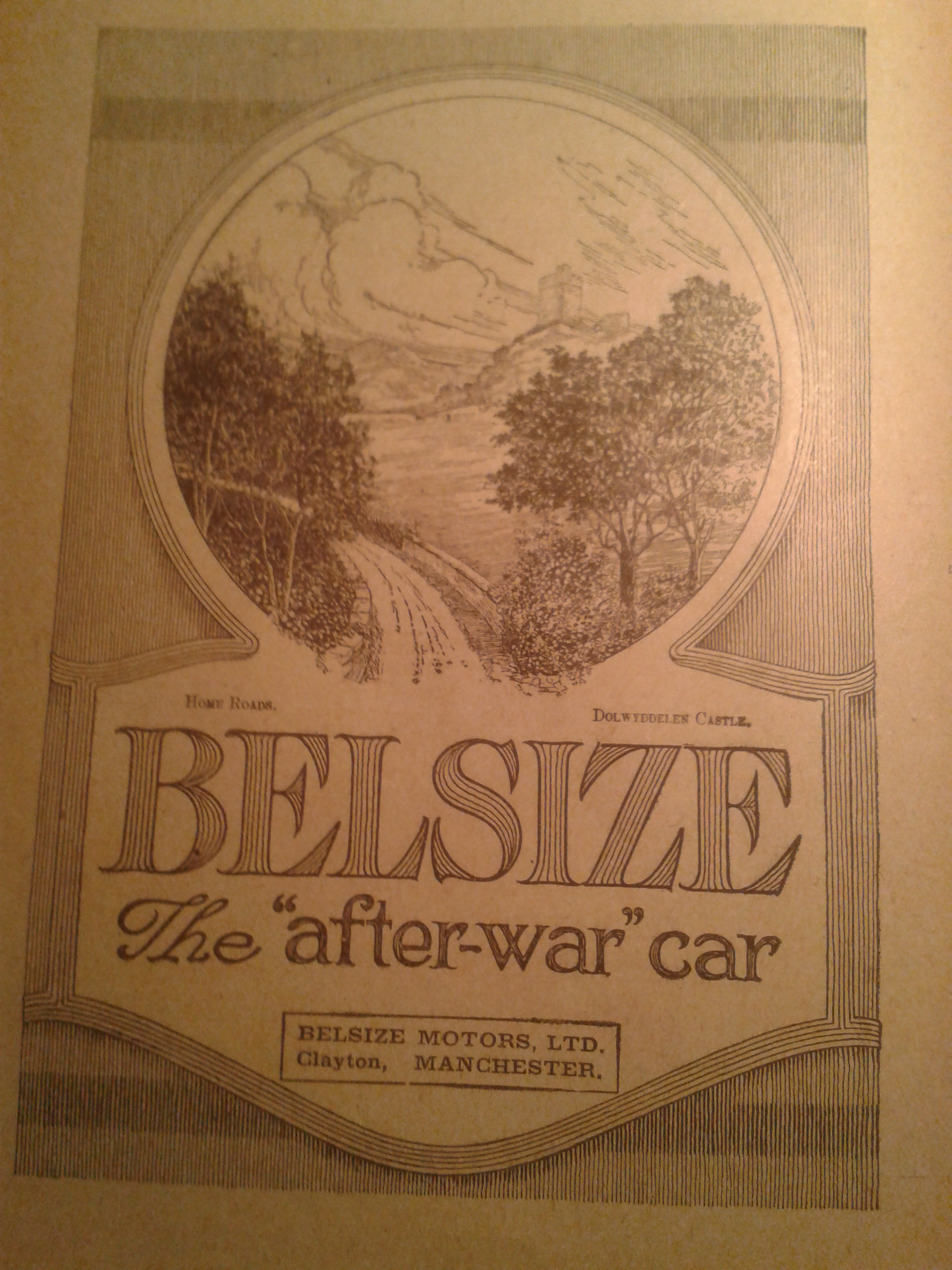
Full-page advertisement for Belsize cars, appearing in the 7th edition of "The Autocar Handbook" (London) published during World War I, c. 1917. There is no vehicle visible, only an empty road!

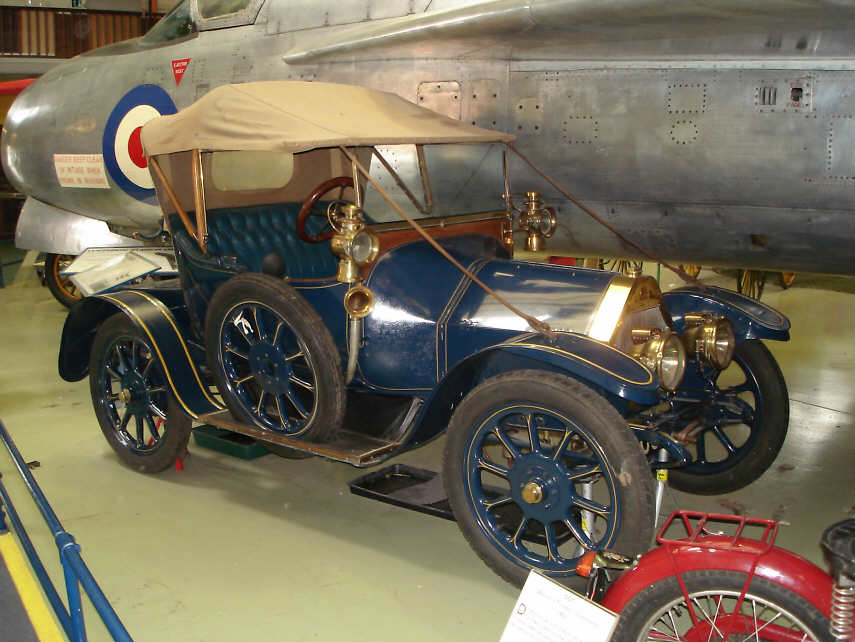
10 hp Belsize of 1912 in the Manchester Museum of Science and Industry

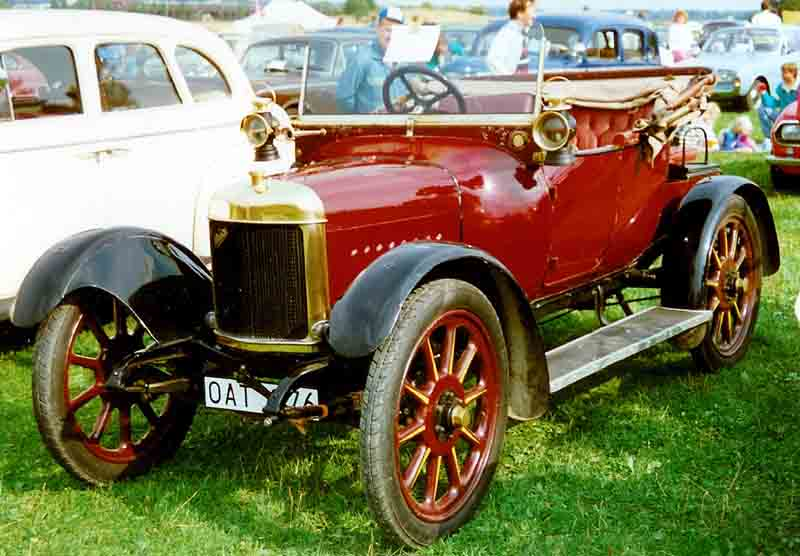
10 hp Belsize 10/12 hp Tourer 1912

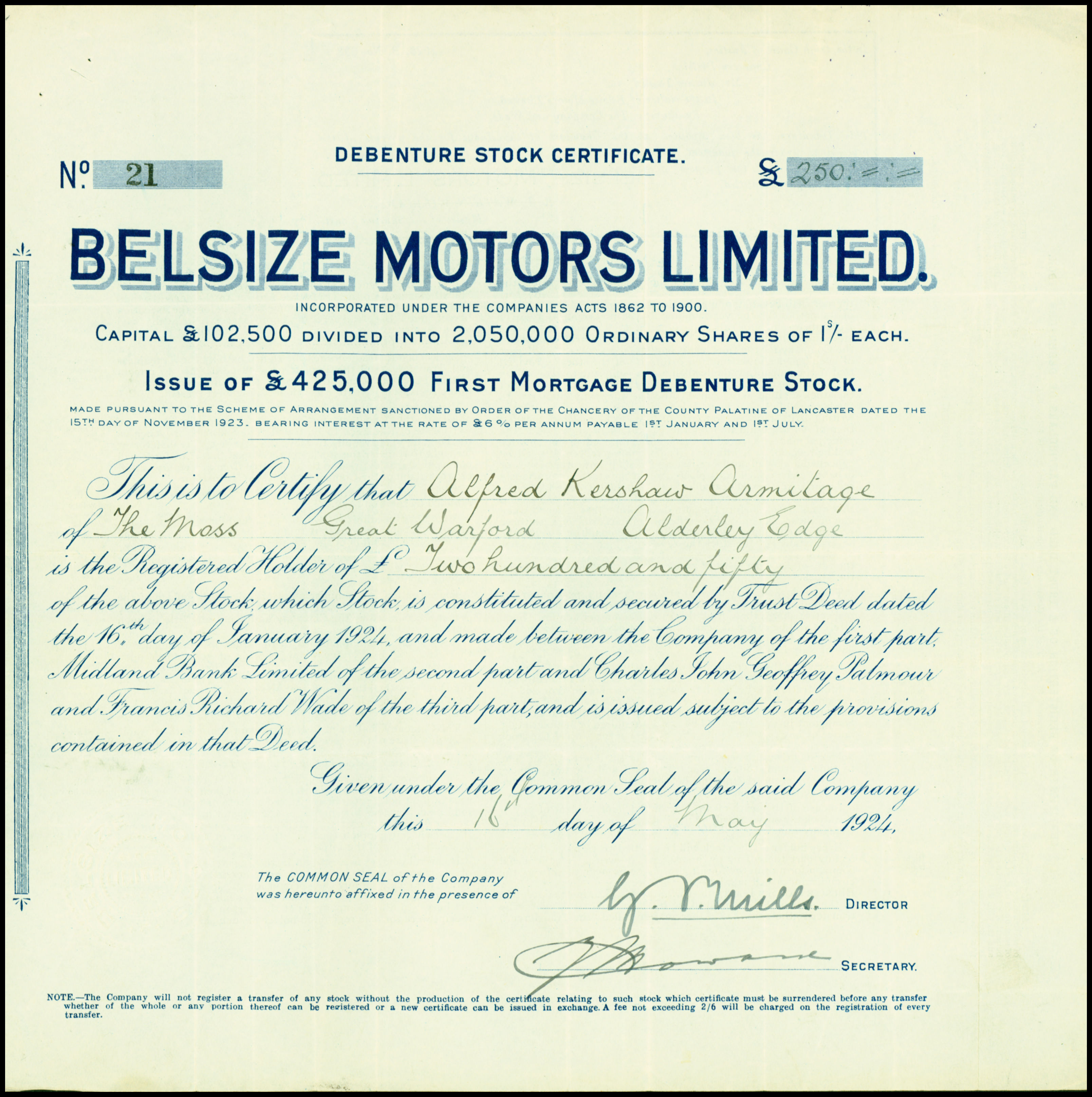
Debenture stock certificate of Belsize Motors Ltd, issued 16. May 1924

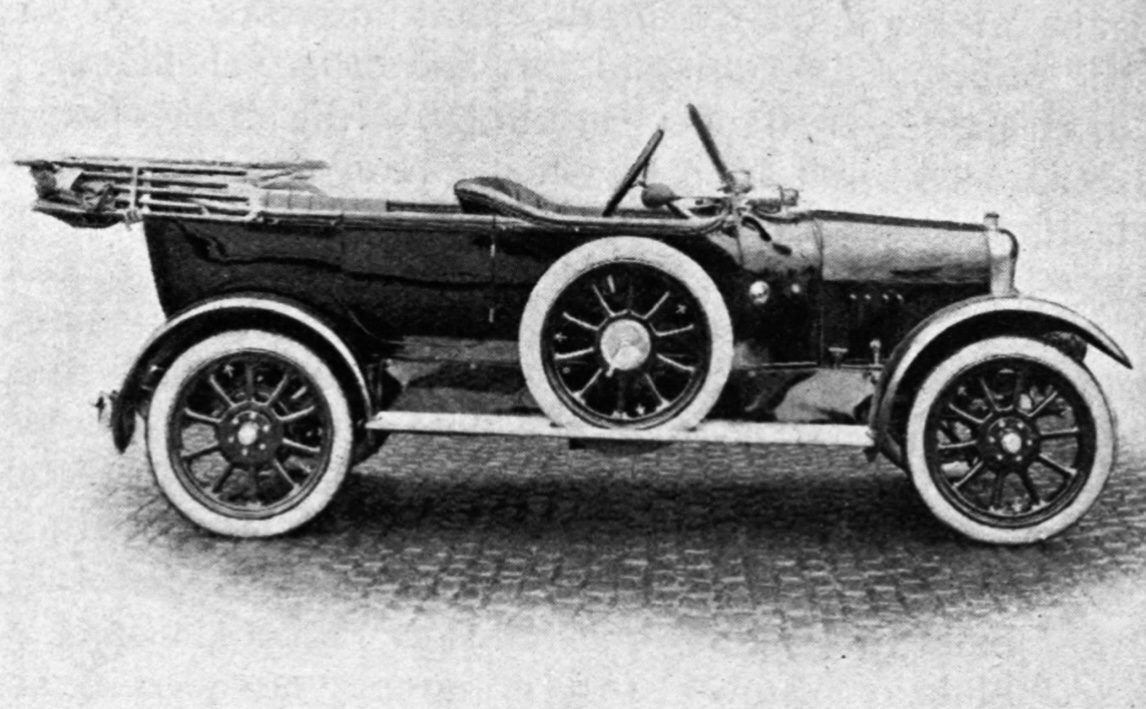
Belsize (1917)

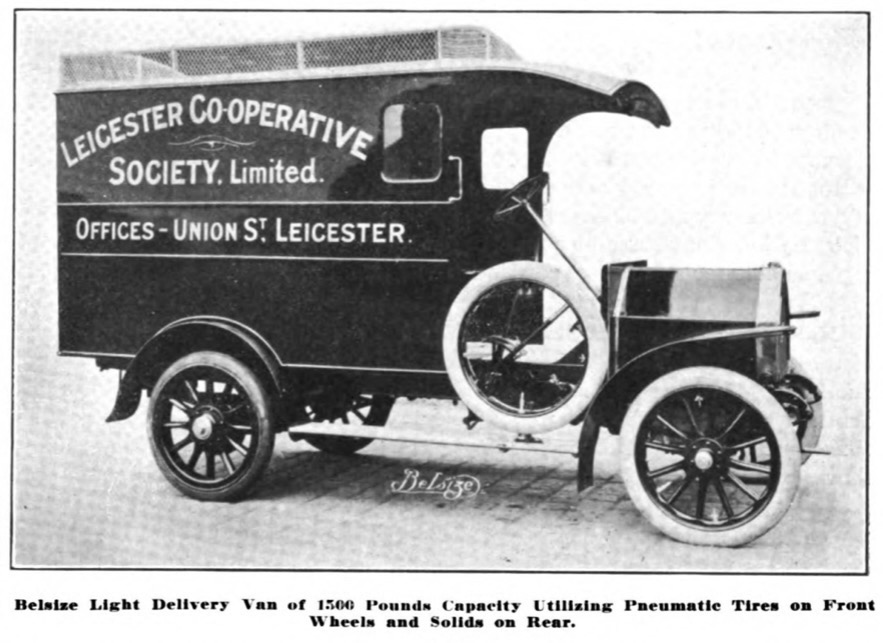
Belsize 0,75 t Truck (1913)

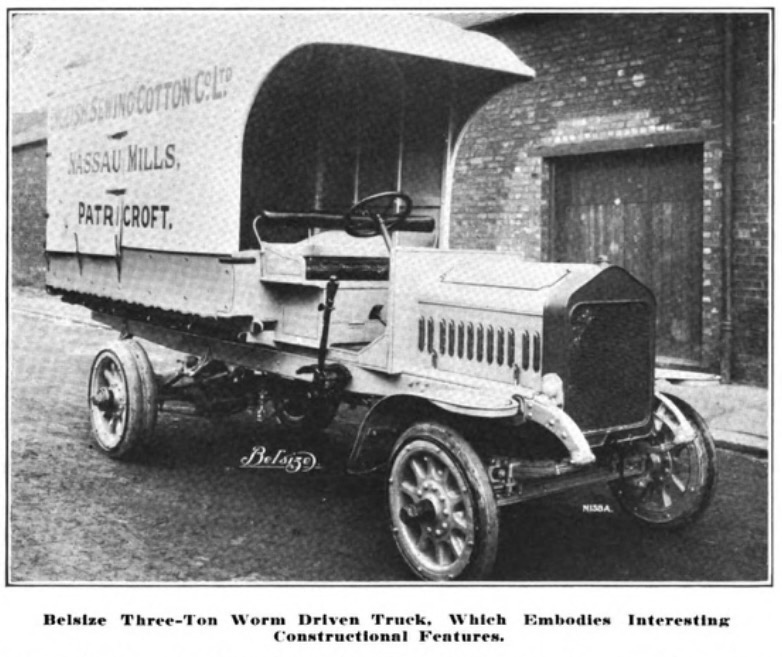
Belsize 3 t Truck (1913)

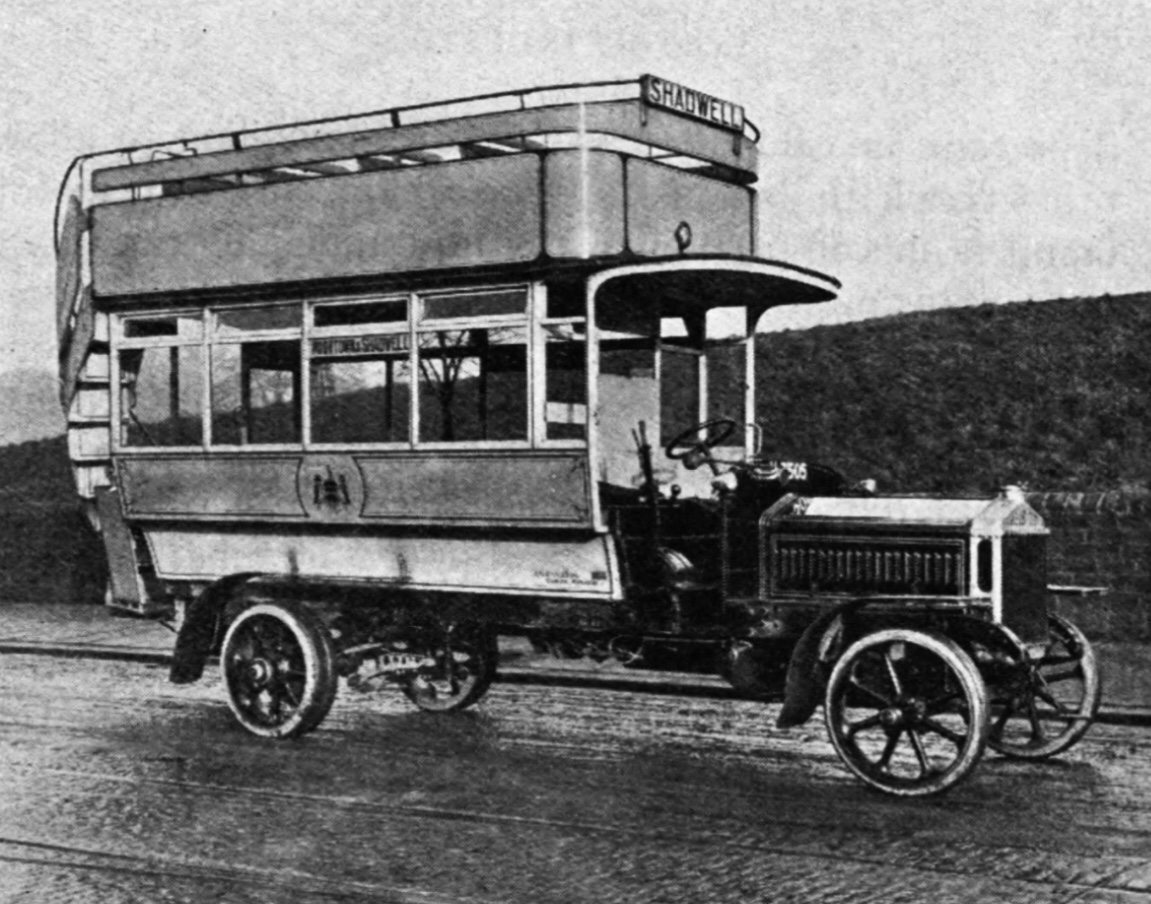
Belsize Omnibus (1917)

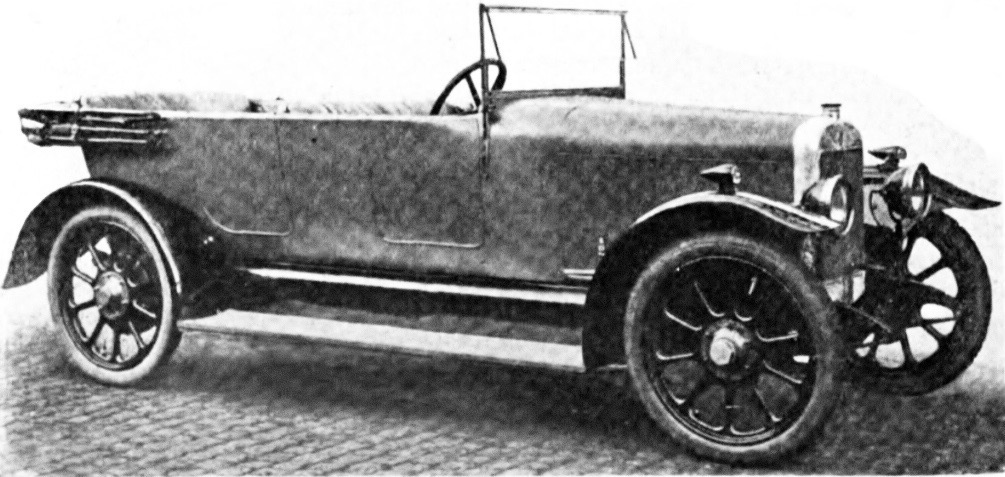
Belsize 15 hp (1919–1923)

Established in 1901, Belsize Motors was based in Clayton, Manchester, England. The company was founded by Marshall & Company and took its name from their Belsize works, where they had built bicycles.

== Marshall & Company ==
Marshall & Company of Clayton Lane, probably Manchester's first automobile manufacturer, built its first car in 1897. The cars were very similar to the French Hurtu, itself a Benz replica, and were sold badged as Marshalls.

Agencies were established in London and Dublin and the car gained a gold medal for efficiency at the 1899 London exhibition. A new more modern four-seat model appeared in 1901 with twin-cylinder engine made by Buchet and was the first to carry the Belsize name as the "Marshall Belsize". In 1903 the company name was changed to Belsize Motors and Engineering. In 1906 this changed again to Belsize Motors Ltd.

Before the First World War they were a major player in the United Kingdom's motor industry, employing 1200 people and making up to 50 vehicles a week. A bewildering range of models were made including taxis, commercial vehicles and fire engines with engines of up to 14.5 litre capacity.

== Post First World War ==
After the First World War they followed a single model policy at first with the 15 hp of 2798 cc but this was joined in 1921 by the Belsize-Bradshaw with a 9 hp 1294 cc V-twin engine made by Dorman and designed by Granville Bradshaw that was partly air-cooled and partly oil-cooled. This gained a reputation for being unreliable and was dropped in 1924. It was replaced by a 1250 cc conventional 4-cylinder model, the 10/20 or RM, and a 1696 cc six the 14/30. The latter was at last an up-to-date car with overhead valves, four-wheel brakes and a four-speed gearbox, but at £415 to £650 it was expensive when compared with the opposition. It was however, too late. The company, which had been in the hands of the receiver since 1923, ceased trading in late 1925.

The company also tried to build a 2496 cc, straight eight engine but this probably never got past the prototype stage although it was advertised at £1050.

== Main car models ==
- 12 hp 1728cc 2-cylinder 1901
- 15/20 2860cc 4-cylinder 1904
- 18/24 3940cc 3 or 3300 4-cylinder 1906
- 24/30 5880 cc 6-cylinder 1906–1908
- 40 hp 7774 cc 6-cylinder 1908
- 60 hp 11,724 cc 6-cylinder 1908
- 14/16 2543 cc 4-cylinder 1909–1913
- 18/22 3000cc 6-cylinder 1910–1913
- 10/12 1950cc 4-cylinder 1912–1916
- 15.9 3016cc 4-cylinder 1913–1915
- 15 hp 2799cc 4-cylinder 1919-23 (enlarged to 3100cc and known as 15/20 in 1923)
- 9 hp Belsize-Bradshaw 1100cc V2 cylinder 1921–1924
- 14/30 1700cc 6-cylinder 1924-25 (also available with 2500cc straight 8-cylinder as the 20/40)

== See also ==
- List of car manufacturers of the United Kingdom
