= ABC Robin =

Robin
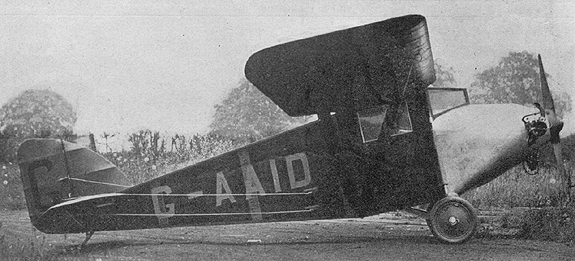

General information
- Type: Cabin monoplane
- Manufacturer: ABC Motors Limited
- Designer: Anthony "Tony" Archibald Fletcher
- Status: Scrapped
- Number built: 1

History
- First flight: 1929
- Retired: 1932

The ABC Robin was a British single-seat light aircraft designed by A. A. (Tony) Fletcher in 1929. It was a high-wing, single-seat monoplane of conventional taildragger configuration. The cockpit was fully enclosed, the first lightplane to be so equipped in Britain. It was designed at the request of T. A. Dennis (managing director) specifically to use the firm's 30–40 h.p. Scorpion engine.

Construction was primarily of wood with metal confined to fittings and a few highly stressed parts. The fuselage was constructed as a wooden box consisting of four spruce longerons with thin plywood covering with light internal bulkheads. The wood-framed wings, of RAF 34 section, were hinged at their inner rear corners to the top of the fuselage and supported by tubular struts in 'Vee' formation to the lower longerons of the fuselage. The tail was also wood-framed and both wings and tail were covered with doped fabric.

The Robin, registered G-AAID, was built by ABC Motors Limited at Hersham in 1929. Its first flight was made at Brooklands in June and it was displayed at the Olympia Aero Show in July. ABC had no aircraft manufacturing facilities, so production aircraft were intended to be made by S. E. Saunders at East Cowes, Isle of Wight. Marketing was taken seriously, with the aircraft painted in the colours of National Flying Services (NFS) from whom an order was anticipated, and it was featured in the NFS 1929 Annual.

The aircraft was modified later in 1929 with the windscreen moved back to allow access to the fuel filler caps from the outside, and with an enlarged fin and rudder. It was granted its certificate of airworthiness in June 1930 and a week later took part in the King's Cup Air Race, but it dropped out with engine problems, which were common with the Scorpion engine. Unfortunately, due to the Great Depression, there was no demand for the aircraft and the sole Robin built was scrapped at Brooklands in 1932.

== Specifications ==
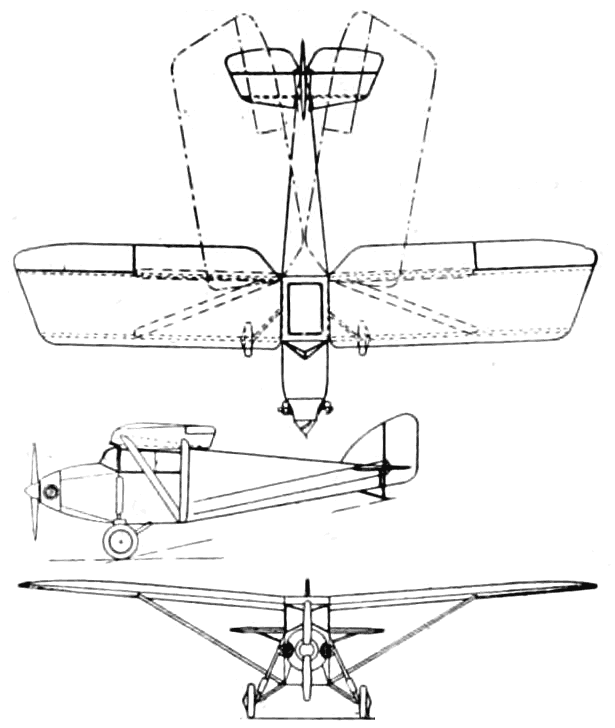
ABC Robin 3-view drawing from Aero Digest January,1930

Data from The Aeroplane 12 July 1928 – Performance figures are estimates

General characteristics

- Crew: one
- Length: 17 ft 4 in (5.28 m)
- Wingspan: 25 ft 4 in (7.72 m)
- Height: 5 ft 9 in (1.73 m)
- Wing area: 110 sq ft (10.23 m^{2})
- Aspect ratio: 5.83
- Airfoil: RAF-34
- Empty weight: 415 lb (188 kg)
- Gross weight: 680 lb (308 kg)
- Powerplant: 1 × ABC Scorpion II piston engine, 40 hp (30 kW)

Performance

- Maximum speed: 105 mph (169 km/h, 91 kn)
- Range: 340 mi (545 km, 295 nmi)
- Service ceiling: 17,000 ft (5,200 m)
- Rate of climb: 750 ft/min (3.8 m/s)
