= Henderson-Glenny Gadfly =

H.S.F.II Gadfly
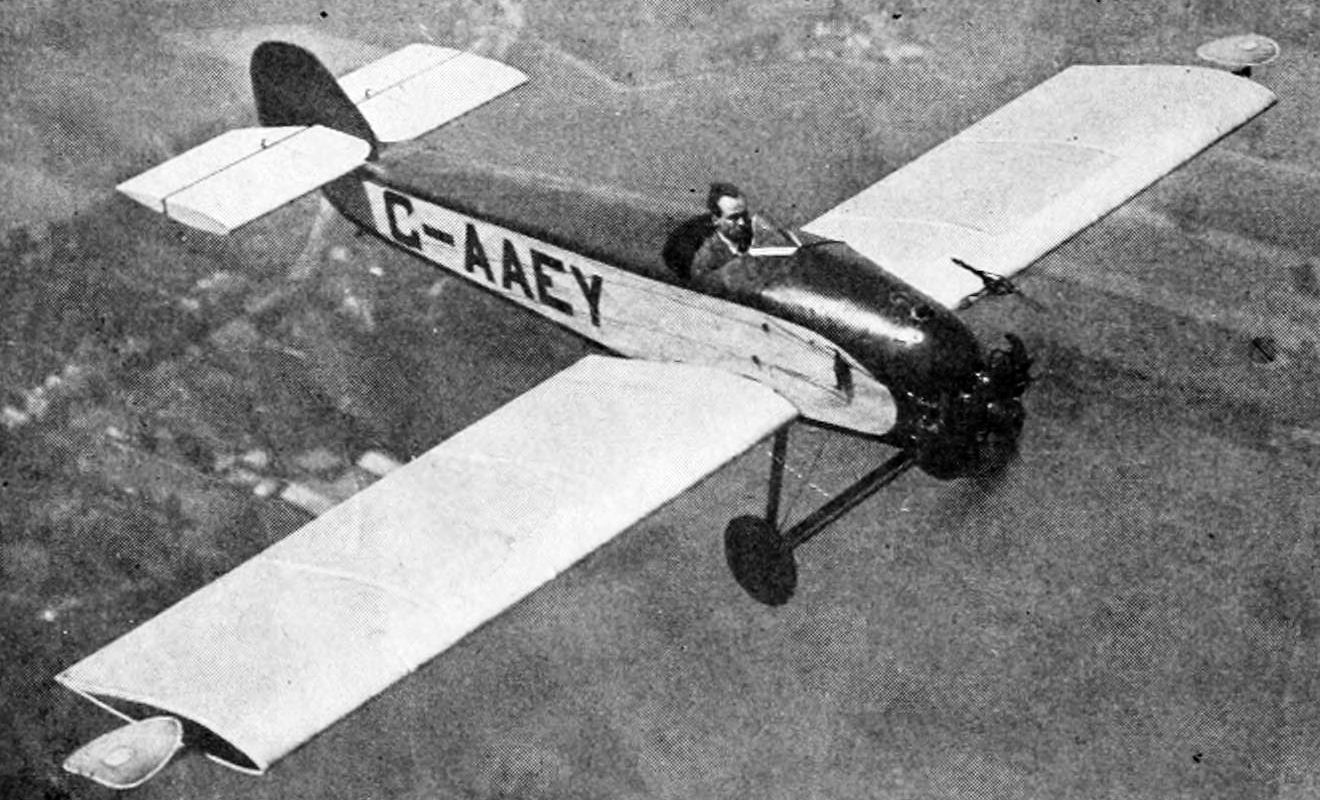

General information
- Type: Single-seat monoplane
- National origin: United Kingdom
- Manufacturer: Glenny and Henderson Limited
- Designer: K.N. Pearson
- Number built: 3

History
- First flight: 1929
- Retired: 1934

The Henderson-Glenny H.S.F.II Gadfly was a British single-seat low-wing monoplane designed by K.N. Pearson and built by Glenny and Henderson Limited at Byfleet, Surrey, England in 1929.

== Design and development ==
The Gadfly was a low-wing monoplane with a fixed conventional landing gear and an open single seat cockpit. The first aircraft, powered by a 35 hp (26 kW) ABC Scorpion II engine, first flew at Brooklands in April 1929. It was designated the Gadfly I and was registered G-AAEY. It was fitted with Pearson rotary ailerons and re-designated Gadfly II when it achieved a world altitude record of 3,021 m (9,911 ft) in the 200 kg class on 16 May 1929 piloted by G.L.P. Henderson.

The second aircraft was a Gadfly II G-AARJ which first flew in August 1929 and was exported to Canada, where it was damaged beyond repair at Kitchener, Ontario, on 25 August 1931. The final aircraft was Gadfly III G-AARK which was the same as the Gadfly II but fitted with a 40 hp (30 kW) Salmson A.D.9 radial engine. It was withdrawn from use in 1930. The first aircraft G-AAEY was last based at Wolverhampton when it was scrapped in June 1934.

== Variants ==
Gadfly I
ABC Scorpion II powered, one built later converted to Gadfly II.
Gadfly II
Same as Gadfly II but fitted with Pearson rotary ailerons, one conversion and one built.
Gadfly III
Salmson A.D.9 radial-engine-powered, one built.

== Specifications (Gadfly II) ==
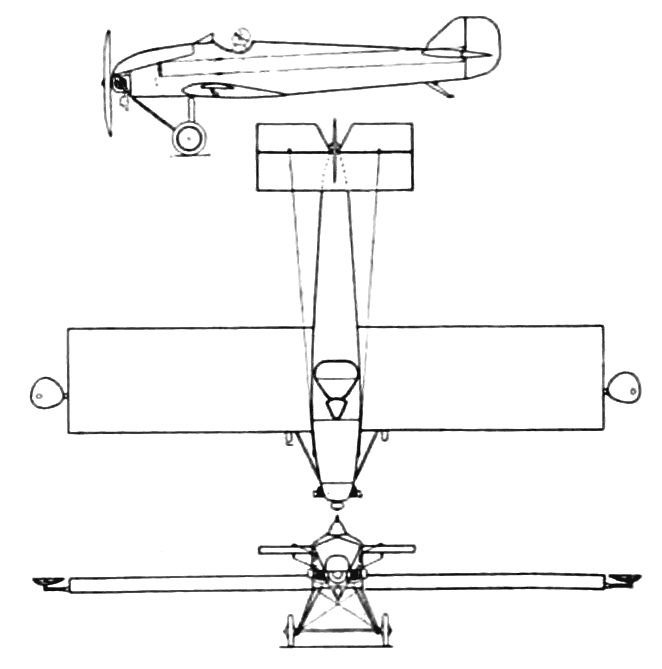
Glenny & Henderson Gadfly 3-view drawing from Aero Digest January,1930

Data from

General characteristics

- Crew: 1
- Length: 17 ft 10 in (5.44 m)
- Wingspan: 25 ft 10 in (7.87 m)
- Empty weight: 455 lb (206 kg)
- Gross weight: 750 lb (340 kg)
- Powerplant: 1 × ABC Scorpion II , 35 hp (26 kW)

Performance

- Cruise speed: 72 mph (116 km/h, 63 kn)
- Range: 350 mi (560 km, 300 nmi)
