= Saynor & Bell Canadian Cub =

Canadian Cub

General information
- Type: Single seat sports
- National origin: Canada
- Manufacturer: Homebuilt
- Designer: George Saynor and Robert Bell
- Number built: 1

History
- First flight: 4 December 1930
- Retired: 11 October 1931

The Saynor & Bell Canadian Cub was a single engine, single seat parasol wing monoplane, designed and built in Canada in 1930. It was intended to be a simple and economical vehicle with which pilots could increase their flying experience. It was destroyed on take-off after a few months of flight and no more were built.

== Development ==
Aircraft engineers George Saynor and Robert Bell came to Canada from England in 1928 to work with Canadian Vickers, only to be made redundant two years later. They then collaborated in the design of the Canadian Cub, intending to produce a simple and economical single seater in which newly soloed pilots could build up their flying hours. They worked in the basement of a Montreal house aided by other Canadian Vickers employees but bearing the financial risk themselves.

The Canadian Cub was a parasol wing monoplane with a wooden framed, fabric covered, constant chord wing which was swept at 10° to move the centre of gravity aft and keep the nose short. The fuselage was a rounded plywood monocoque, with a built-in central pylon carrying an integral 2 ft (610 mm) span wing centre section. The outer wings attached to this centre section, braced with lift struts of the less-common X form from the lower fuselage longerons. The wing pylon raised the wing to bring it level with the pilot's eyes. Visibility from the single seat open cockpit was further aided by a small trailing edge cut-out. The tail surfaces had steel tube frames, canvas covered. The fin carried a generous, rounded rudder, with its lower edge above the extreme fuselage. The horizontal stabilizer was mounted at mid-fuselage with the elevators separated. The Canadian Cub had a conventional undercarriage with split axle main gear. The wheels were mounted on V-struts to the lower fuselage, with axles running inwards and upwards to the central fuselage bottom.

The Canadian Cub was stressed to allow engine powers up to 60 hp (45 kW) but the designers' financial position only enabled them to fit the small 34 hp (25 kW) ABC Scorpion II. In the end this was the only engine installed. The Cub first flew on 4 December 1930 from St Hubert Airport, piloted by E.J. Cooper.

== Operational history ==
After the first flight the Canadian Cub was flown by several other pilots, who all agreed it was a delight to fly but that it was underpowered by the Scorpion engine. It had some aerobatic capability and could fly inverted. Ground handling tests in April 1930 revealed a structural weakness when the undercarriage collapsed. Repaired, the Cub lost a wing in a collision whilst parked at St Hubert when another aircraft taxied into it. Fitted with a new wing the aircraft was flown to de Lesseps Field, Toronto, probably to be demonstrated. On 11 October the engine failed at take-off; the pilot was unhurt but the sole Canadian Cub, registration CF-APS, was destroyed.

== Specifications ==
Data from Canadian Aircraft since 1909, Flight 1 May 1931 p.377:THE CANADIAN "CUB"

General characteristics

- Crew: 1
- Length: 18 ft 0 in (5.49 m)
- Wingspan: 25 ft 0 in (7.62 m)
- Height: 6 ft 1.5 in (1.867 m)
- Wing area: 98.3 sq ft (9.13 m^{2})
- Empty weight: 512 lb (232 kg)
- Gross weight: 750 lb (340 kg)
- Fuel capacity: 7.5 Imp gal (9.0 US gal, 34 L)
- Powerplant: 1 × ABC Scorpion II air-cooled flat twin, 34 hp (25 kW)

Performance

- Maximum speed: 100 mph (160 km/h, 87 kn)
- Cruise speed: 80 mph (130 km/h, 70 kn)
- Stall speed: 44 mph (71 km/h, 38 kn)
- Range: 320 mi (510 km, 280 nmi)
- Endurance: 4 hours
- Service ceiling: 10,000 ft (3,000 m)
- Rate of climb: 500 ft/min (2.5 m/s) initial
- Wing loading: 7.65 lb/sq ft (37.4 kg/m^{2})
- Power/mass: 0.0532 hp/lb (0.0875 kW/kg)
