= Blackburn Sidecar =

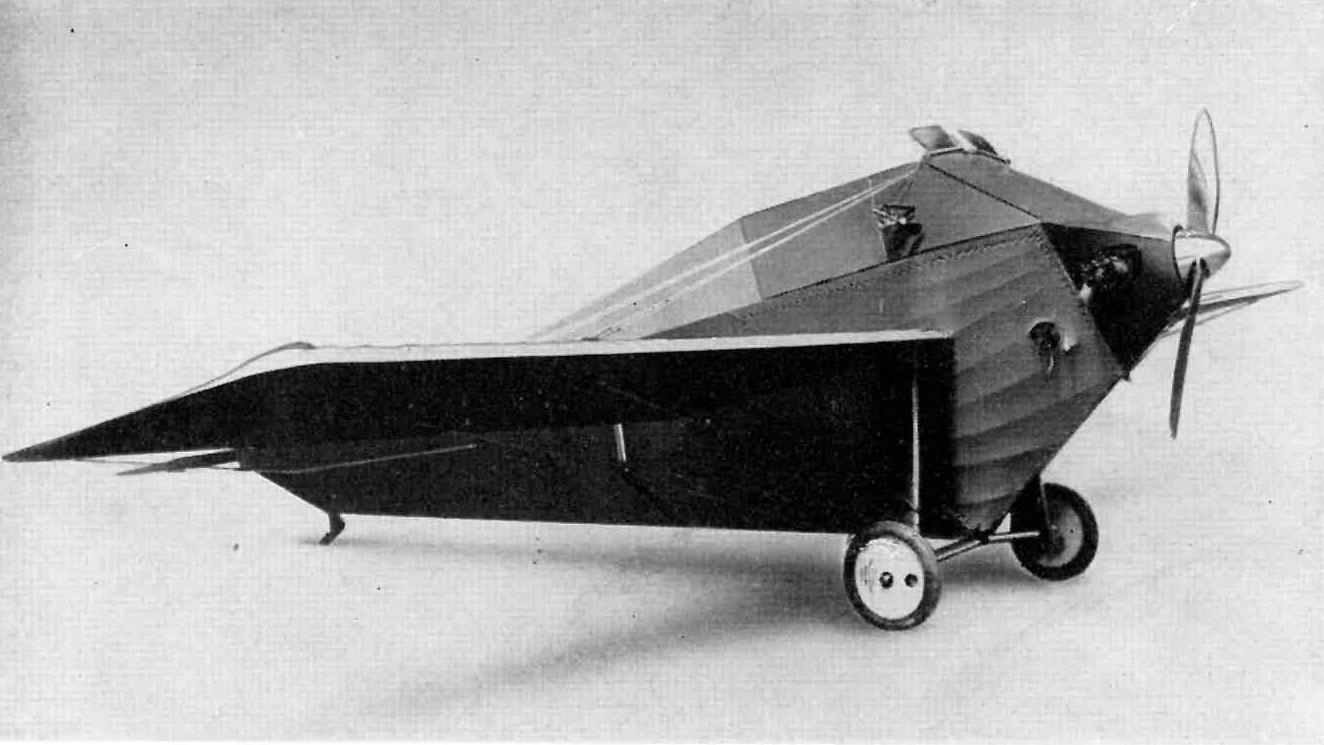

General information
- Type: Ultra-light aircraft
- National origin: England
- Manufacturer: Blackburn Aeroplane & Motor Co. Ltd.
- Number built: 1

History
- Introduction date: 1919

The Blackburn Sidecar was a two-seat ultra-light aircraft built by the Blackburn Aeroplane & Motor Company at Brough in 1919. There is no evidence that it ever flew.

== Development ==
The side-by-side two-seat Sidecar was built by the Blackburn Aeroplane & Motor Co. Ltd. at Brough in 1919 for Mr.K.M Smith.

It was a small mid-winged aircraft, with wings and other flying surfaces of constant chord. It had no fixed tail surfaces. The triangular cross-section fuselage was unusually deep, such that the undercarriage cross-axle was attached to the keel or bottom longeron.

The sole Sidecar, eventually registered G-EALN on 26 August 1920, was exhibited at Harrods Department store in Knightsbridge during March 1919. It did not fly with the low-powered Gnat. About July 1921 the aircraft was sold to Mr. Haydon-White, Blackburn's London manager who had it re-engined with a 100-horsepower (75-kilowatt) Anzani radial. By October 1921 it was logged as unairworthy. There is no record of it flying during these four months.

== Specifications (Gnat) ==
Data from Janes 1919.

General characteristics

- Crew: one
- Capacity: one passenger
- Length: 20 ft 6 in (6.25 m)
- Wingspan: 27 ft 3 in (8.31 m)
- Height: 6 ft 3 in (1.91 m)
- Wing area: 123 sq ft (11.43 m^{2})
- Empty weight: 392 lb (178 kg)
- Gross weight: 850 lb (386 kg)
- Powerplant: 1 × ABC Gnat flat twin , 40 hp (30 kW)

Performance

- Maximum speed: 83 mph (134 km/h, 72 kn) (estimated)
- Range: 300 mi (480 km, 260 nmi) (estimated)
