= Avro Club Cadet =

British biplane trainer aircraft

Club Cadet
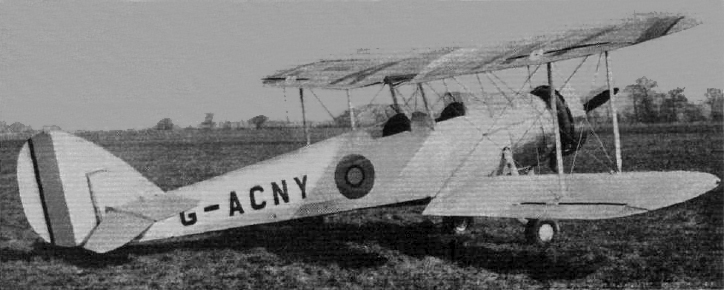
- Avro 638 Club Cadet (G-ACNY), at Heston 1934

General information
- Type: Trainer
- Manufacturer: Avro
- Number built: 27 (17 · 638 + 1 · 639 + 9 · 640)

History
- Manufactured: 1933–1935
- Introduction date: 1933
- First flight: May 1933
- Developed from: Avro Cadet

The Avro Club Cadet was a 1930s single-engined British biplane trainer aircraft, designed and built by Avro as a development of the earlier Cadet. It was planned for private and club use and, unlike the Cadet, was fitted with folding wings.

== Design and development ==
The Avro 638 Club Cadet was a modified version of the Avro Cadet, similarly intended for both private and club use. The Club Cadet was fitted with unstaggered wings, that could be folded to help save hangar space; the staggered biplane wings of the earlier Cadet were unsuitable to be adapted for folding. The prototype flew in May 1933, powered by an Armstrong Siddeley Genet Major radial piston engine, another 16 were built, and production finished in 1935.

A single prototype of an enclosed three-seat cabin version, the Avro 639 Cabin Cadet was built, and first flew in 1933, but did not enter production. A second three-seat version, the Avro 640 Cadet, was produced for joy-riding work, with a widened fuselage accommodating an open cockpit for two passengers side by side in front of the pilot. Nine of these were built, the first four powered by 140 hp (104 kW) Cirrus Hermes IV engines, and the remaining five powered by Genet Major engines.

== Operational history ==
Most Club Cadets were used by flying schools, although intended for private as well as club use, the largest user being Airwork, that operated five Club Cadets. These were later re-engined with 130 hp (100 kW) de Havilland Gipsy Major engines; the air-cooled in-line inverted engines reduced drag, and gave improved fuel consumption.

== Variants ==
Avro 638 Club Cadet
Two-seat trainer aircraft, powered by 135 hp (101 kW) Genet Major (radial) or 130 hp (100 kW) Gipsy Major I (inverted in-line) engine, 17 built.
Avro 638 Club Cadet Special
One aircraft, fitted with a 140 hp (104 kW) Cirrus Hermes IVA inverted in-line engine.
Avro 639 Cabin Cadet
Enclosed cockpit, one built.
Avro 640 Cadet
Three seat joyriding aircraft, powered by 140 hp (104 kW) Cirrus Hermes IV inverted in-line (first four aircraft) or 135 hp (101 kW) Genet Major engine, nine built.

== Operators ==
United Kingdom

- Airwork

== Specifications (Avro 638 Genet Major I) ==
Data from Avro Aircraft since 1908

General characteristics

- Crew: 2
- Length: 24 ft 9 in (7.54 m)
- Wingspan: 30 ft 2 in (9.19 m)
- Height: 8 ft 9 in (2.67 m)
- Wing area: 262 sq ft (24.3 m^{2})
- Empty weight: 1,244 lb (564 kg)
- Gross weight: 2,000 lb (907 kg)
- Powerplant: 1 × Armstrong Siddeley Genet Major 1 7-cylinder air-cooled radial piston engine, 135 hp (101 kW)
- Propellers: 2-bladed fixed-pitch propeller

Performance

- Maximum speed: 115 mph (185 km/h, 100 kn)
- Cruise speed: 100 mph (160 km/h, 87 kn)
- Range: 325 mi (523 km, 282 nmi)
- Wing loading: 7.63 lb/sq ft (37.3 kg/m^{2})
- Power/mass: 0.075 hp/lb (0.123 kW/kg)

== See also ==
Related development

- Avro Tutor
- Avro Cadet
