= BAT Crow =

F.K.28 Crow
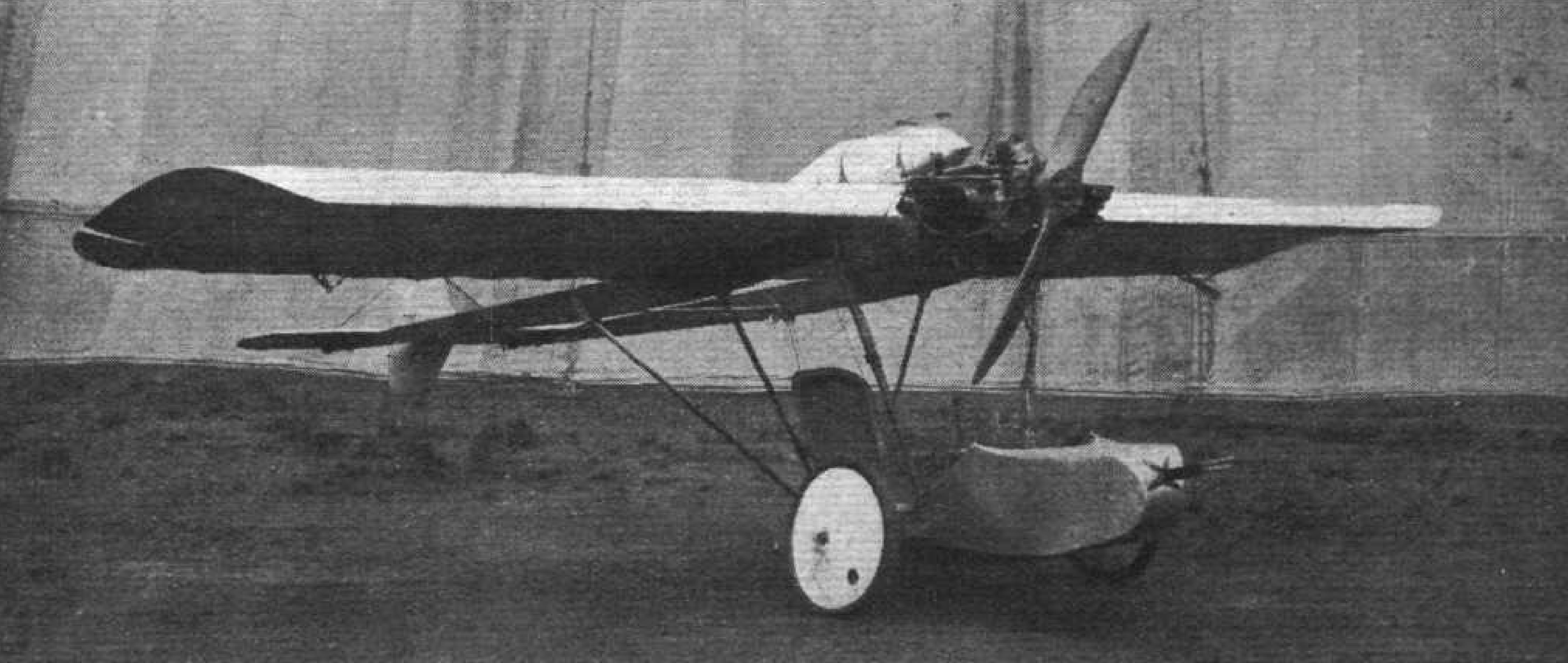

General information
- Type: Ultralight
- Manufacturer: British Aerial Transport Company Limited
- Designer: Frederick Koolhoven
- Number built: 1

History
- First flight: 1920

The BAT F.K.28 Crow was a British single-seat ultralight aircraft produced by British Aerial Transport Company Limited of London. It was intended to be the "aerial equivalent of the motor cycle".

== Design and development ==
The smallest of designs from Frederick Koolhoven when he worked for the British Aerial Transport Company was the F.K.28 Crow. It was very small and light high-wing monoplane, with a conventional tractor configuration. The monoplane's tail surfaces were carried by two slim booms. An ABC Gnat 2-cylinder horizontally-opposed engine - together with fuel and oil tanks - was mounted on the wing centre section. The pilot's seat was set between the landing gear suspended below the wing. It was designed to be dismantled for road-transport with the removal of twelve bolts. It was displayed at the First Air Traffic Exhibition in Amsterdam, but it did not fly until some time later. It only flew once and proved to be underpowered. It was scrapped in 1920.

== Specifications (F.K.28 Crow) ==
Data from Flight 1 January 1920 p.18

General characteristics

- Crew: 1
- Length: 14 ft 0 in (4.27 m)
- Wingspan: 15 ft 0 in (4.57 m)
- Height: 4 ft 6 in (1.37 m)
- Empty weight: 220 lb (100 kg)
- Gross weight: 400 lb (181 kg)
- Powerplant: 1 × ABC Gnat 2-cylinder air-cooled horizontally-opposed piston engine, 40 hp (30 kW)
- Propellers: 2-bladed fixed-pitch propeller

Performance

- Maximum speed: 75 mph (121 km/h, 65 kn)
- Range: 150 mi (240 km, 130 nmi)
- Endurance: 2 hours
