= Port Victoria P.V.8 =

Prototype British fighter aircraft

P.V.8 / Eastchurch Kitten
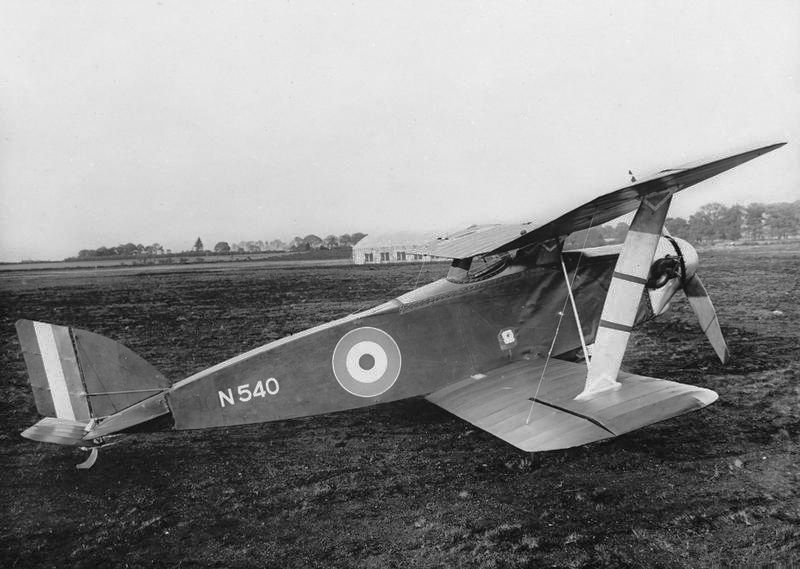
- Port Victoria P.V.8 Eastchurch Kitten circa 1917.

General information
- Type: Fighter
- Manufacturer: RNAS Marine Experimental Aircraft Depot, Port Victoria
- Designer: G H Millar
- Status: Prototype
- Number built: 1

History
- First flight: 7 September 1917

The Port Victoria P.V.8 Eastchurch Kitten was a prototype British fighter aircraft of the First World War designed and built by the Port Victoria Marine Experimental Aircraft Depot on the Isle of Grain. It was a small and light biplane with a conventional wheeled undercarriage intended to operate from platforms on small ships, but while it had good handling, an unreliable and underpowered engine meant that the aircraft did not enter production, with only one prototype being completed.

== Design and development ==
In 1916, the British Admiralty produced a requirement for a small single seater fighter landplane intended to fly off short platforms on the forecastle of the Royal Navy's Destroyers and other small ships to provide a widely distributed airship interceptor. Orders were placed with the RNAS Experimental Flight at Eastchurch and the Marine Aircraft Experimental Department at Port Victoria on the Isle of Grain for single prototypes to meet this requirement.

G.H. Millar, the chief technical officer of the Eastchurch flight, designed a small, angular, single-bay biplane, named the Eastchurch Kitten, powered by the required 45 hp (34 kW) ABC Gnat engine. It was larger and heavier than the Isle of Grain design, with equi-span upper and lower wings, which had bracing wires that ran from the wings through the undercarriage axle to the opposite wing. Initially it had no fixed horizontal tailplane, being fitted with a balanced elevator. Armament was a single Lewis gun mounted to the top wing.

The Eastchurch Kitten was part built when Harry Busteed, the commander of the Eastchurch Experimental Flight, was posted to the Isle of Grain to take command of the Marine Aircraft Experimental Department, taking Millar and the part built Eastchurch Kitten with him to Port Victoria for completion.

The Eastchurch Kitten was given the designation P.V.8, with the competing Port Victoria designed P.V.7, named the Grain Kitten, flying first in June 1917. The Eastchurch Kitten did not fly until 7 September 1917, powered by a 35 hp (26 kW) ungeared Gnat engine, as the originally planned engine was unavailable. After this first flight, when it was found to be unstable, it was fitted with a small fixed tailplane with revised elevators. Thus modified, it had superior performance and handling to the Grain Kitten, but was similarly plagued by the terrible unreliability of the Gnat. Official testing praised the view for the pilot and the handling but considered the aircraft too fragile for regular use.

No orders followed, with adapted versions of the Sopwith Camel, operating both from aircraft carriers and from lighters towed behind destroyers being used instead. The Eastchurch Kitten was packed for dispatch to the United States of America in March 1918 for evaluation, but it is uncertain whether it was actually dispatched.

In 2014, a replica Kitten – originally started in the 1980s – was completed by enthusiasts at the Yorkshire Air Museum.

== Specifications ==
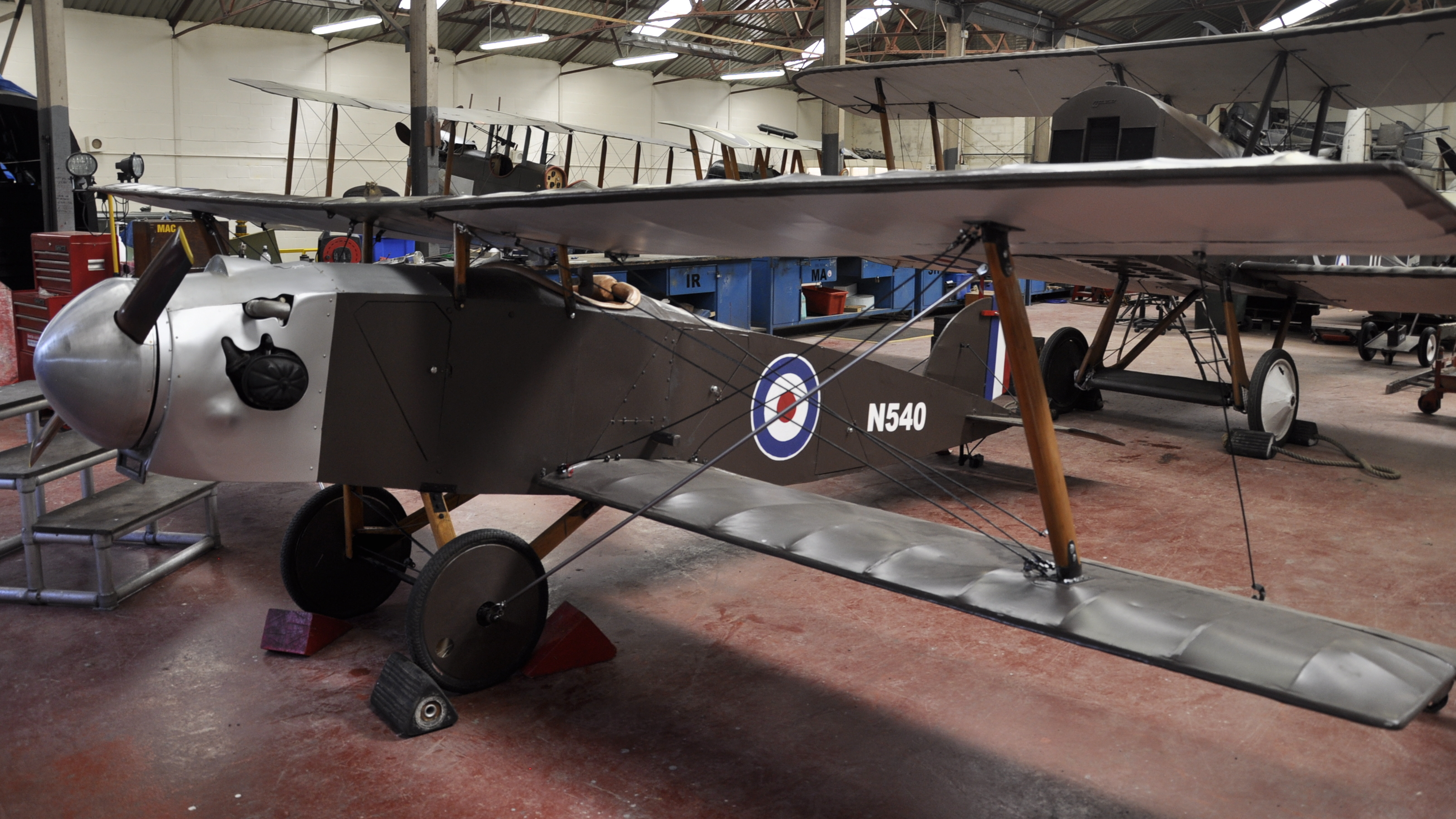
A replica of the Port Victoria P.V.8 Eastchurch Kitten at the Yorkshire Air Museum.

Data from War Planes of the First World War: Volume One Fighters

General characteristics

- Crew: One
- Length: 15 ft 7 1/2 in (4.76 m)
- Wingspan: 18 ft 11 1/2 in (5.78 m)
- Height: 5 ft 2 in (1.57 m)
- Wing area: 106 sq ft (9.8 m^{2})
- Empty weight: 340 lb (154 kg)
- Gross weight: 586 lb (266 kg)
- Powerplant: 1 × ABC Gnat air cooled two-cylinder horizontally-opposed piston engine, 35 hp (26 kW)

Performance

- Maximum speed: 94.5 mph (152.1 km/h, 82.1 kn) at 2,000 ft (610 m)
- Service ceiling: 14,900 ft (4,500 m)
- Time to altitude: 11 min to 10,000 ft (3,000 m)

Armament

- Guns: 1x .303 in Lewis gun above upper wing

== See also ==
Aircraft of comparable role, configuration, and era

- Port Victoria P.V.7
- Martin KF-1
