= ABC Gnat =

Gnat
- Type: Flat-twin aero engine
- National origin: United Kingdom
- Manufacturer: ABC Motors Limited
- Designer: Granville Bradshaw
- First run: 1916
- Number built: 17

The ABC Gnat was a 45 hp (34 kW) two-cylinder aero engine designed by British engineer Granville Bradshaw for use in light aircraft. The Gnat was built by ABC Motors, first running in 1916, production ceased in December 1918. 17 engines were built from an original order of 18.

== Applications ==
- BAT Crow
- Blackburn Sidecar
- Eastchurch Kitten
- Grain Kitten
- Loening M-2 Kitten
- Macchi M.16G
- Royal Flying Corps ‘Aerial Target’
- Sopwith Sparrow
- Sopwith Tadpole

== Specifications (Gnat I) ==
Data from Lumsden

=== General characteristics ===
- Type: 2-cylinder air-cooled flat-twin
- Bore: 4.33 in (110 mm)
- Stroke: 4.72 in (120 mm)
- Displacement: 139.06 cu in (2.28 L)
- Dry weight: 115 lb (52 kg)

=== Components ===
- Valvetrain: Overhead valve, two valves per cylinder
- Fuel system: Single A.B.C. carburettor
- Fuel type: Petrol (40-50 Octane rating)
- Cooling system: Air-cooled

=== Performance ===
- Power output: 45 hp (34 kW) at 1,920 rpm (takeoff power)
- Specific power: 0.32 hp/cu in (14.9 kW/L)
- Compression ratio: 3.8:1
- Power-to-weight ratio: 0.4 hp/lb (0.6 kW/kg)

== See also ==
- ABC motorcycles

Comparable engines

- Armstrong Siddeley Ounce
- Bristol Cherub
- Walter Atom

Related lists

- List of aircraft engines
