= Airship Development AD1 =

British advertising airship

AD1

General information
- Type: Non-rigid airship
- National origin: United Kingdom
- Manufacturer: Airship Development Company
- Number built: 1

History
- First flight: 6 November 1929

The Airship Development AD1 was a British non-rigid gas-filled advertising airship. The airship had a 60,000 cubic feet (1,700 m^{3}) envelope made by the Reginald Foster Dagnall Company of Guildford. The airship, registered G-FAAX, was erected at the old Cramlington Airship Station near Newcastle where it was test flown on 6 November 1929. It was powered by a 100 hp (75 kW) ABC Hornet four-cylinder piston engine mounted on a three-seater underslung car.

The AD1 was used for advertising and had a 76 by 24 ft (23.2 by 7.3 m) panel on each side for messages. It was dismantled after an accident in June 1931 when a storm tore it from its moorings and damaged the envelope.

== Bibliography ==
- Michael Austen, ed. (1999). The British Civil Aircraft Register 1919-1999. Tonbridge, Kent, England: Air-Britain. ISBN 0 85130 281 5.
- "Enterprise in Modern Advertising", Flight: 847, 1 August 1930
- "The AD.l. Non-Rigid Airship", Flight: 1182, 8 November 1929
