= ABC motorcycles =

British motorcycle manufacturer

ABC Motors Ltd
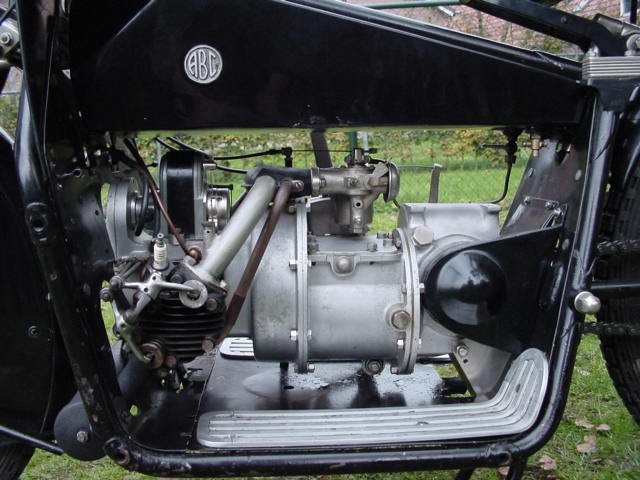
- Industry: Manufacturing and engineering
- Founded: 1919
- Defunct: 1923
- Fate: Wound up
- Headquarters: London
- Key people: Ronald Charteris and Granville Bradshaw
- Products: Motorcycles

ABC motorcycles was a British motorcycle manufacturer established in 1914 by Ronald Charteris in London. Several British motorcycle firms started up with the name "ABC", including Sopwith. The All British Engine Company Ltd. of London was founded in 1912 and later changed to ABC Motors Ltd. With chief engineer Granville Bradshaw, Charteris built a range of engines throughout the First World War. From 1913 ABC produced motorcycle engines.

In 1918, ABC made a motorcycle with a 400 cc flat-twin engine mounted with its cylinders across the frame, several years before BMW adapted the design. Bradshaw challenged BMW's use of his patented design in 1926. In 1919 ABC also produced the Scootamota – an early motor scooter. The company stopped producing motorcycles after 1923 because of competition from cheaper manufacturers.

== Development ==
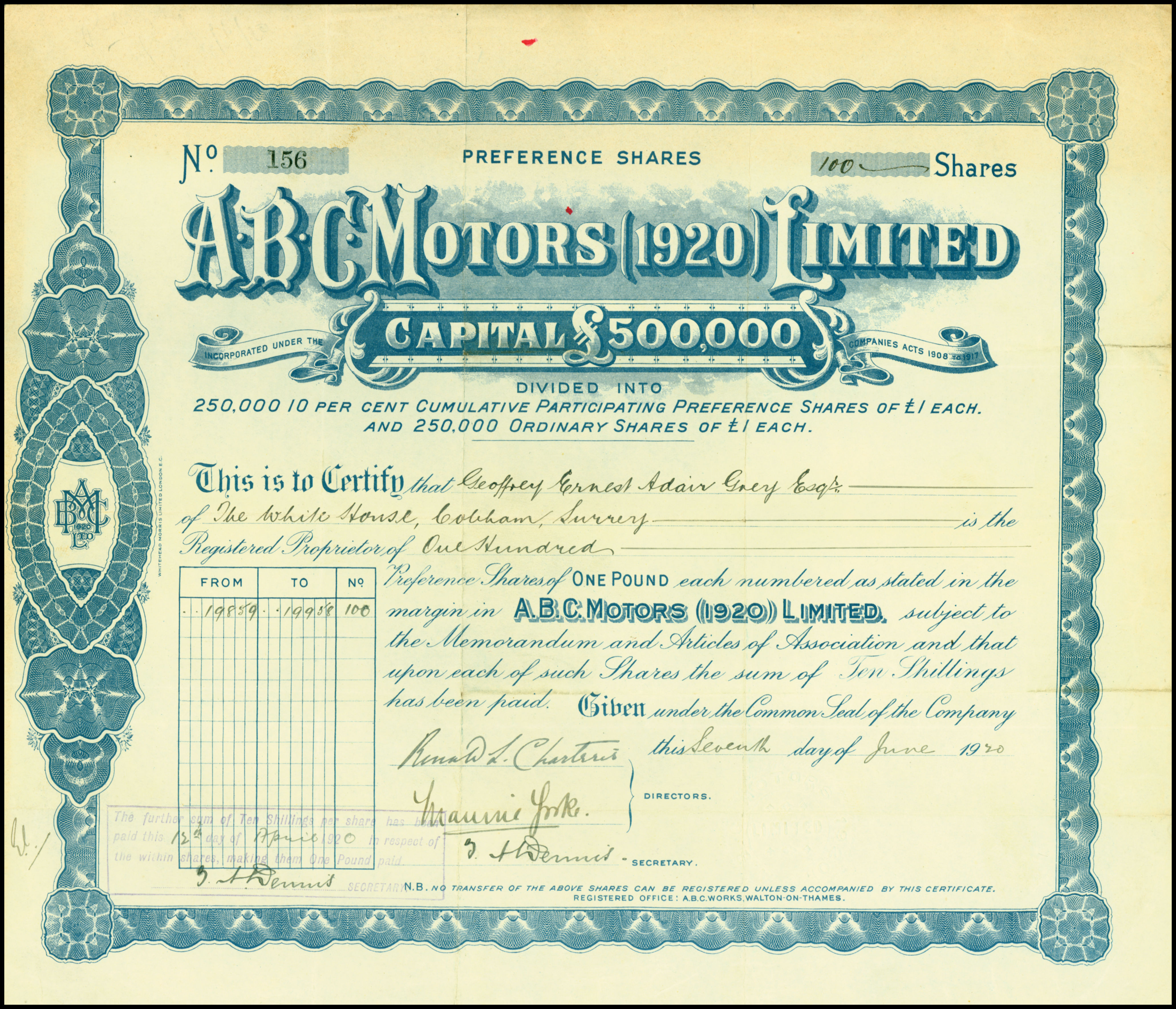
Preference Share of the A.B.C. Motors (1920) Ltd., issued 7. June 1920

ABC had always had a close association with the Sopwith aircraft company. They were both at Brooklands and in 1912 a Sopwith with an ABC engine flown by Harry Hawker had won the Michelin Endurance Prize. In December 1918 it was announced that ABC had transferred the rights for manufacturing and selling motor cycles to Sopwith Aviation Co Ltd, allowing Granville Bradshaw of ABC Motors to focus on design. In 1919 they jointly exhibited the Sopwith 390 cc horizontally opposed twin-cylinder overhead valve (OHV) machine at the annual Motor Cycle show. It aroused a lot of interest with innovative front and rear leaf springs and "expanding" brakes, wet sump lubrication, and a four-speed gearbox. It was also one of the first motorcycles with a duplex cradle frame. One thing it did not have, however, was any form of starting mechanism; the rider had to "paddle" or bump start to get the engine going. The ABC 400 was made under licence by the Sopwith Aviation & Engineering Co in Kingston-upon-Thames and 2,200 were produced. Later models had improved valve gear, speedometers, and electric lighting. Sidecar outfits were also produced as optional extras.

In 1920 a new company, ABC Motors (1920) Ltd was formed to make aircraft engines, light cars, and motorcycles, all with a flat-twin engine designed by Bradshaw.

== Models ==
ABC FIREFLY 250cc

Only one prototype was made in 1916, the original engine and gearbox where found and used to make an exact copy. See here; https://www.youtube.com/watch?v=CaFHanJ4FD0

=== ABC 400 cc ===
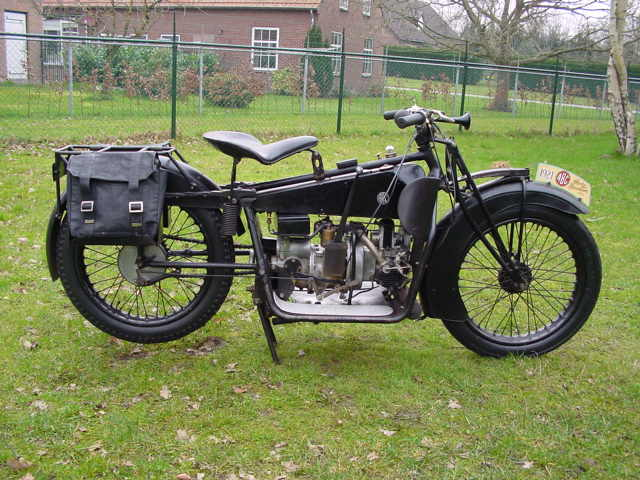
1920 ABC 400 cc

Produced between 1919 and 1925, the ABC 400 had a 398 cc horizontally opposed twin-cylinder overhead-valve four-stroke engine, four-speed gearbox with an H-gate and was fitted with an advanced (for the time) carburettor from Claudel-Hobson to give a top speed of 70 mph (110 km/h).

=== ABC 500 cc ===
French manufacturer Gnome & Rhone produced an improved 493 cc version of this machine under licence until 1925. Between 1920 and 1924 they produced over 3,000 of the 'French' ABC but relatively few have survived.

=== ABC Skootamota ===
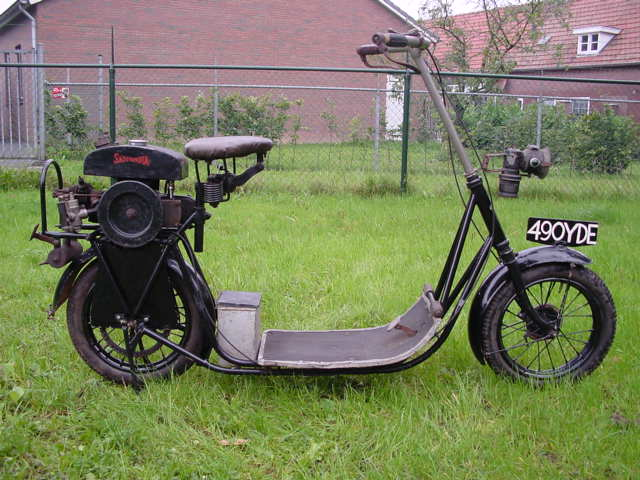
The ABC Skootamota

The Bradshaw-designed Skootamota was an early scooter built by Gilbert Campling Ltd. and sold as the ABC Skootamota.

The Skootamota handled well and was very stable despite small wheels. The single-cylinder 123 cc engine was located above the rear wheel and drove it by chain. Early Skootamotas had exhaust over intake (EOI) engines but later versions had OHV engines. The Skootamota had external contracting band brakes on both wheels. The saddle and spacious footboard provided rider comfort. The Skootamota, quickly imitated by competitors, had a top speed of just 15 mph (24 km/h). It ceased production in 1922.

== Demise ==
The shift from producing aircraft to making motorcycles was more difficult than ABC expected, and their costs – and prices – were higher than the new competitors emerging after 1920. They stopped producing motorcycles after 1923, although some production continued in Germany until 1925. Another company called ABC, unconnected to Charteris or Bradshaw, produced 247 cc and 269 cc motorcycles with Villiers engines in Birmingham between 1922 and 1924.

== See also ==
- ABC Motors
