= Granville Bradshaw =

English engine designer (1887–1969)

Granville Eastwood Bradshaw
- Born: 1887; Preston, Lancashire, England
- Died: 1969 (aged 81–82); Hitchin, Hertfordshire, England
- Parent(s): William & Annie Bradshaw
- Engineering career
- Institutions: Royal Aeronautical Society
- Practice name: ABC Motors
- Projects: Motorcycle and Aero-engines
- Awards: Officer of the Order of the British Empire

Granville Eastwood Bradshaw OBE, AFRAeS (1887–1969) was an English engineer and inventor who designed motorcycle, auto, and aero-engines.

== History ==
Bradshaw was born in Preston, Lancashire in 1887 as the son of William and Annie Bradshaw. His father was a jeweler and optician.

Bradshaw's early work was involved with the early pioneers of flight, which led him to become an expert on stressing. He designed the Star Monoplane including the engine for Star Aircraft when he was 19, which he later flew. He then started to work on aero-engines and was the co-founder of the All-British Engine Company (later ABC Motors then Walton Motors).

The ABC radial aero-engines designed and built during the First World War were extremely advanced and the government placed large orders for the Dragonfly. A number of aircraft were designed to use the Dragonfly, but the engines were plagued by problems and failed to live up to the promises. The design was taken over by the Royal Aircraft Establishment at Farnborough to try to resolve the issues, but with the end of the war, it was abandoned.

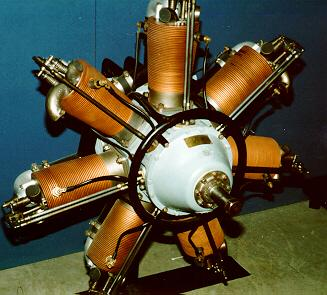
A Wasp engine

He was appointed an Officer of the Order of the British Empire for his war work in 1918.

At the end of 1918 it was announced that ABC Motors Ltd had transferred its motor cycle manufacturing and selling rights to Sopwith Aviation Co Ltd, with Granville Bradshaw of ABC Motors Ltd concentrating on design. This allowed him to sell his designs to other companies. He designed a number of engines for Panther motorcycles. He also designed motorcycle engines where the cylinder barrels were oil cooled, and these were made under licence by J Walmsley & Co (Preston) Ltd. The flat-twin 500cc version of this engine was utilised from 1921 on the Zenith-Bradshaw motorcycle. A single cylinder 348cc version was optional for OK-Supreme, Sheffield-Henderson, Dot, Orbit, and Coventry-Mascot in 1922; and an 1100cc V-twin version of this oil-cooled engine was adopted for the Belsize light car.

His biggest seller was selling patents for gambling machines, although he lost all the money he made in further business deals. He later concentrated on toroidal internal-combustion engines. Bradshaw produced a long list of inventions and designs, although very few achieved commercial success.

A biography Granville Bradshaw: a flawed genius? by Barry Jones was published in 2008.

== The Omega toroidal engine ==
The Bradshaw engine was a type of swing-piston engine which had a single toroidal cylinder, containing four double-ended curved pistons. The pistons reciprocated in pairs, while the cylinder rotated around them, carrying around the spark plug and inlet/exhaust ports.

== Family ==
In 1911 he married Violet Elsie Partridge in Wolverhampton. Violet petitioned for divorce in 1926. Bradshaw married again in 1927 to Muriel Mathieson in Kensington, London. He died in 1969 at Hitchin in Hertfordshire.

== See also ==
- ABC motorcycles
- ABC Motors
