= List of members of the European Parliament for Italy, 1994–1999 =

Members of the European Parliament for Italy
ECSC delegation	(1952)
EP delegation	(1958)
1st term	(1979)
2nd term	(1984)
3rd term	(1989)
4th term	(1994)
5th term	(1999)
6th term	(2004)
7th term	(2009)
8th term	(2014)
9th term	(2019)
10th term	(2024)

This is a list of the 87 members of the European Parliament for Italy in the 1994 to 1999 session.

== List ==
Name	National party	EP Group	Constituency
Aldo Arroni	Forza Italia	FE (until 4 July 1995) UFE (until 14 June 1998) EPP	
Claudio Azzolini	Forza Italia	FE (until 4 July 1995) UFE (until 14 June 1998) EPP	
Monica Stefania Baldi	Forza Italia	FE (until 4 July 1995) UFE (until 14 June 1998) EPP	
Valerio Baldini	Forza Italia	FE (until 4 July 1995) UFE (until 14 June 1998) EPP	
Giampiero Boniperti	Forza Italia	FE (until 4 July 1995) UFE (until 14 June 1998) EPP	
Ernesto Caccavale	Forza Italia	FE (until 4 July 1995) UFE	
Luigi Caligaris	Forza Italia	FE (until 4 July 1995) UFE (until 31 January 1997) NI (until 18 February 1997) ELDR	
Ombretta Colli	Forza Italia	FE (until 4 July 1995) UFE (until 14 June 1998) EPP	
Alessandro Danesin	Forza Italia	FE (until 4 July 1995) UFE (until 14 June 1998) EPP	
Stefano De Luca	Forza Italia	FE (until 4 July 1995) UFE (until 18 February 1997) ELDR	
Pietro Antonio Di Prima	Forza Italia	FE (until 4 July 1995) UFE (until 14 June 1998) EPP	
Luigi Andrea Florio	Forza Italia	FE (until 4 July 1995) UFE (until 14 June 1998) EPP	
Riccardo Garosci	Forza Italia	FE (until 4 July 1995) UFE (until 14 June 1998) EPP	
Giacomo Leopardi	Forza Italia	FE (until 4 July 1995) UFE (until 14 June 1998) EPP	
Giancarlo Ligabue	Forza Italia	FE (until 4 July 1995) UFE (until 14 June 1998) EPP	
Franco Malerba	Forza Italia	FE (until 4 July 1995) UFE (until 14 June 1998) EPP	
Alfonso Luigi Marra	Forza Italia	FE (until 4 July 1995) UFE	
Roberto Mezzaroma	Forza Italia	FE (until 4 July 1995) UFE (until 15 December 1998) EPP	
Eolo Parodi	Forza Italia	FE (until 4 July 1995) UFE (until 14 June 1998) EPP	
Guido Podestà	Forza Italia	FE (until 4 July 1995) UFE (until 14 June 1998) EPP	
Giacomo Santini	Forza Italia	FE (until 4 July 1995) UFE (until 14 June 1998) EPP	
Umberto Scapagnini	Forza Italia	FE (until 4 July 1995) UFE (until 14 June 1998) EPP	
Antonio Tajani	Forza Italia	FE (until 4 July 1995) UFE (until 14 June 1998) EPP	
Luisa Todini	Forza Italia	FE (until 4 July 1995) UFE (until 14 June 1998) EPP	
Guido Viceconte	Forza Italia	FE (until 4 July 1995) UFE (until 14 June 1998) EPP	
Corrado Augias	Democratic Party of the Left (until 31 December 1998) Democrats of the Left	PES	
Francesco Baldarelli	Democratic Party of the Left (until 31 December 1998) Democrats of the Left	PES	
Roberto Barzanti	Democratic Party of the Left (until 31 December 1998) Democrats of the Left	PES	
Rinaldo Bontempi	Democratic Party of the Left (until 31 December 1998) Democrats of the Left	PES	
Pierre Carniti	Democratic Party of the Left (until 31 December 1998) Democrats of the Left	PES	
Luigi Alberto Colajanni	Democratic Party of the Left (until 31 December 1998) Democrats of the Left	PES	
Biagio De Giovanni	Democratic Party of the Left (until 31 December 1998) Democrats of the Left	PES	
Giulio Fantuzzi	Democratic Party of the Left (until 31 December 1998) Democrats of the Left	PES	
Fiorella Ghilardotti	Democratic Party of the Left (until 31 December 1998) Democrats of the Left	PES	
Renzo Imbeni	Democratic Party of the Left (until 31 December 1998) Democrats of the Left	PES	
Andrea Manzella	Democratic Party of the Left (until 31 December 1998) Democrats of the Left	PES	
Enrico Montesano (until 10 November 1996) Pasqualina Napoletano (from 11 November 1996)	Democratic Party of the Left (until 31 December 1998) Democrats of the Left	PES	
Achille Occhetto (until 11 October 1998)	Democratic Party of the Left	PES	
Giorgio Ruffolo	Independent Left (Italy)	PES	
Roberto Speciale	Democratic Party of the Left (until 31 December 1998) Democrats of the Left	PES	
Luciano Vecchi	Democratic Party of the Left (until 31 December 1998) Democrats of the Left	PES	
Gerardo Bianco	People's Party	EPP	
Giovanni Burtone	People's Party	EPP	
Carlo Casini	People's Party	EPP	
Pierluigi Castagnetti	People's Party	EPP	
Maria Paola Colombo Svevo	People's Party	EPP	
Giampaolo D'Andrea (until 26 October 1998) Giuseppe Mottola (from 11 November 1998)	People's Party	EPP	
Antonio Graziani	People's Party	EPP	
Carlo Secchi	People's Party (Until 22 October 1995) United Christian Democrats	EPP	
Umberto Bossi	Northern League	ELDR (until 18 February 1997) NI	
Gipo Farassino	Northern League	ELDR (until 18 February 1997) NI	
Raimondo Fassa	Northern League	ELDR	
Marco Formentini	Northern League	ELDR (until 18 February 1997) NI	
Marilena Marin	Northern League	ELDR (until 14 December 1994) FE (until 4 July 1995) Union for Europe	
Luigi Moretti	Northern League	ELDR (until 18 February 1997) NI	
Alexander Langer (until 3 July 1995) Gianni Tamino (from 11 July 1995)	Federation of the Greens	G	
Adelaide Aglietta	Federation of the Greens	G	
Carlo Ripa di Meana	Federation of the Greens (until 12 July 1998) Green Left	G (until 12 July 1998) EUL–NGL	
Luciano Pettinari	Communist Refoundation Party (until 27 June 1996) Movement of Unitarian Communists	EUL–NGL (until 24 May 1998) PES	
Luigi Vinci	Communist Refoundation Party	EUL–NGL	
Fausto Bertinotti	Communist Refoundation Party	EUL–NGL	
Luciana Castellina	Communist Refoundation Party (until 26 November 1996) Movement of Unitarian Communists	EUL–NGL	
Lucio Manisco	Communist Refoundation Party (Until 24 May 1999) Party of Italian Communists	EUL–NGL	
Pier Ferdinando Casini	Christian Democratic Centre	FE (until 4 July 1995) UFE (until 19 September 1995) EPP	
Alessandro Fontana	Christian Democratic Centre	FE (until 4 July 1995) UFE (until 10 December 1996) EPP	
Enrico Ferri	Italian Democratic Socialist Party (until 19 September 1995) Christian Democratic Centre (until 12 October 1998) Democratic Union for the Republic	NI (until 14 December 1994) FE (until 4 July 1995) UFE (until 9 September 1996) EPP	
Livio Filippi	Segni Pact The Democrats	EPP	
Danilo Poggiolini	Segni Pact	EPP	
Mariotto Segni (until 15 September 1995) Vincenzo Viola (from 18 September 1995)	Segni Pact	EPP	
Gianfranco Dell'Alba	Pannella List	ERA	
Marco Pannella (until 28 March 1996) Olivier Dupuis (from 30 March 1996)	Pannella List	ERA	
Elena Marinucci	Italian Socialist Party (until 31 December 1998) Italian Democratic Socialists	PES	
Riccardo Nencini	Italian Socialist Party (until 31 December 1998) Italian Democratic Socialists	PES	
Leoluca Orlando	The Network	G	
Giorgio La Malfa	Italian Republican Party	ELDR	
Michl Ebner	South Tyrolean People's Party	EPP	
Pino Rauti	Movimento Sociale Italiano	NI	
Amedeo Amadeo	National Alliance	NI	
Roberta Angelilli	National Alliance	NI	
Spalato Bellerè (until 21 April 1998) Luciano Schifone (from 6 May 1998)	National Alliance	NI	
Marco Cellai	National Alliance	NI	
Gianfranco Fini	National Alliance	NI	
Cristiana Muscardini	National Alliance	NI	
Nello Musumeci	National Alliance	NI	
Gastone Parigi	National Alliance	NI	
Salvatore Tatarella	National Alliance	NI	
Antonio Michele Trizza	National Alliance	NI	
