= 1994 European Parliament election =

- 9–12 June 1994

All 567 seats to the European Parliament 285 seats needed for a majority
- Turnout: 56.8% ▼1.7 pp
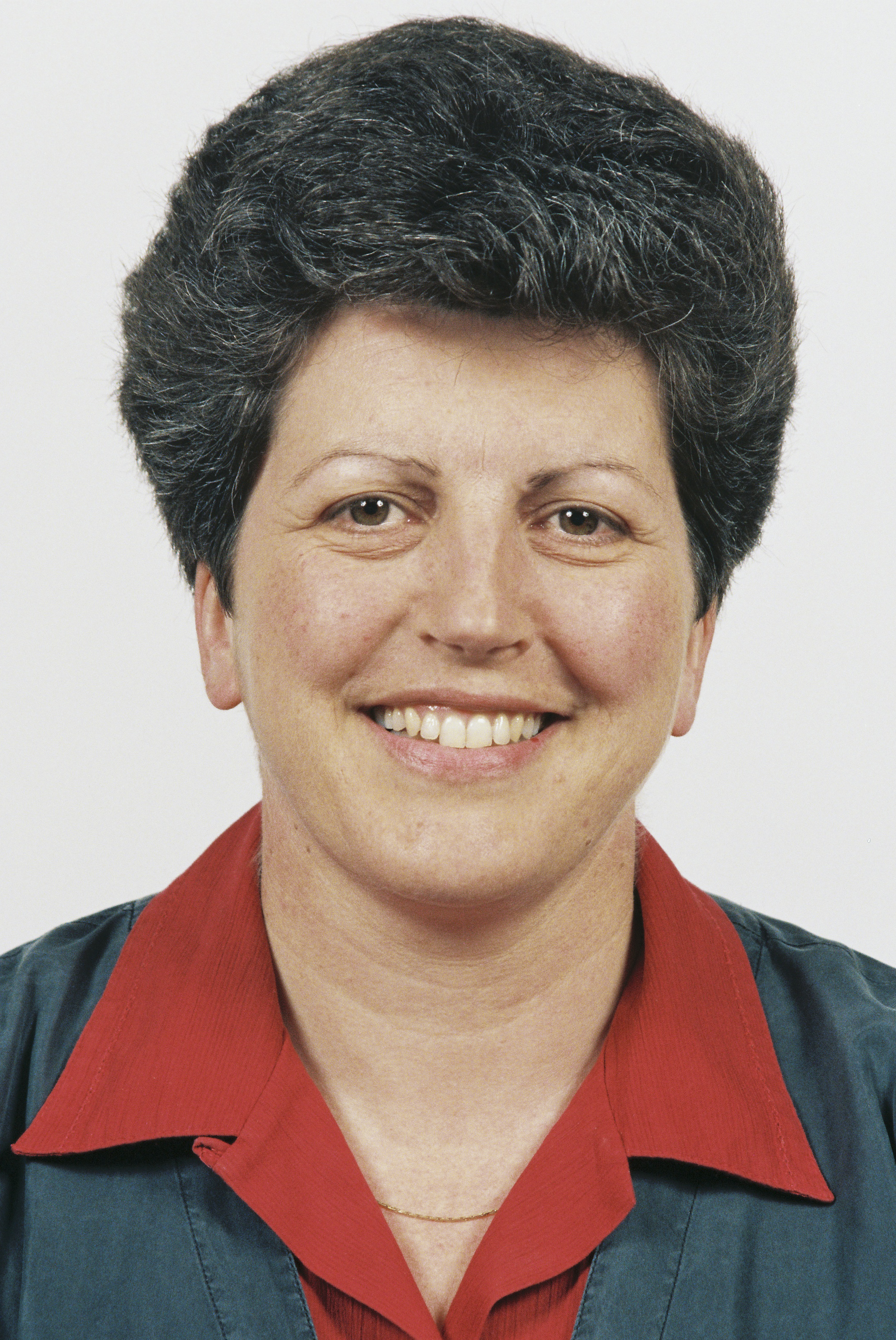

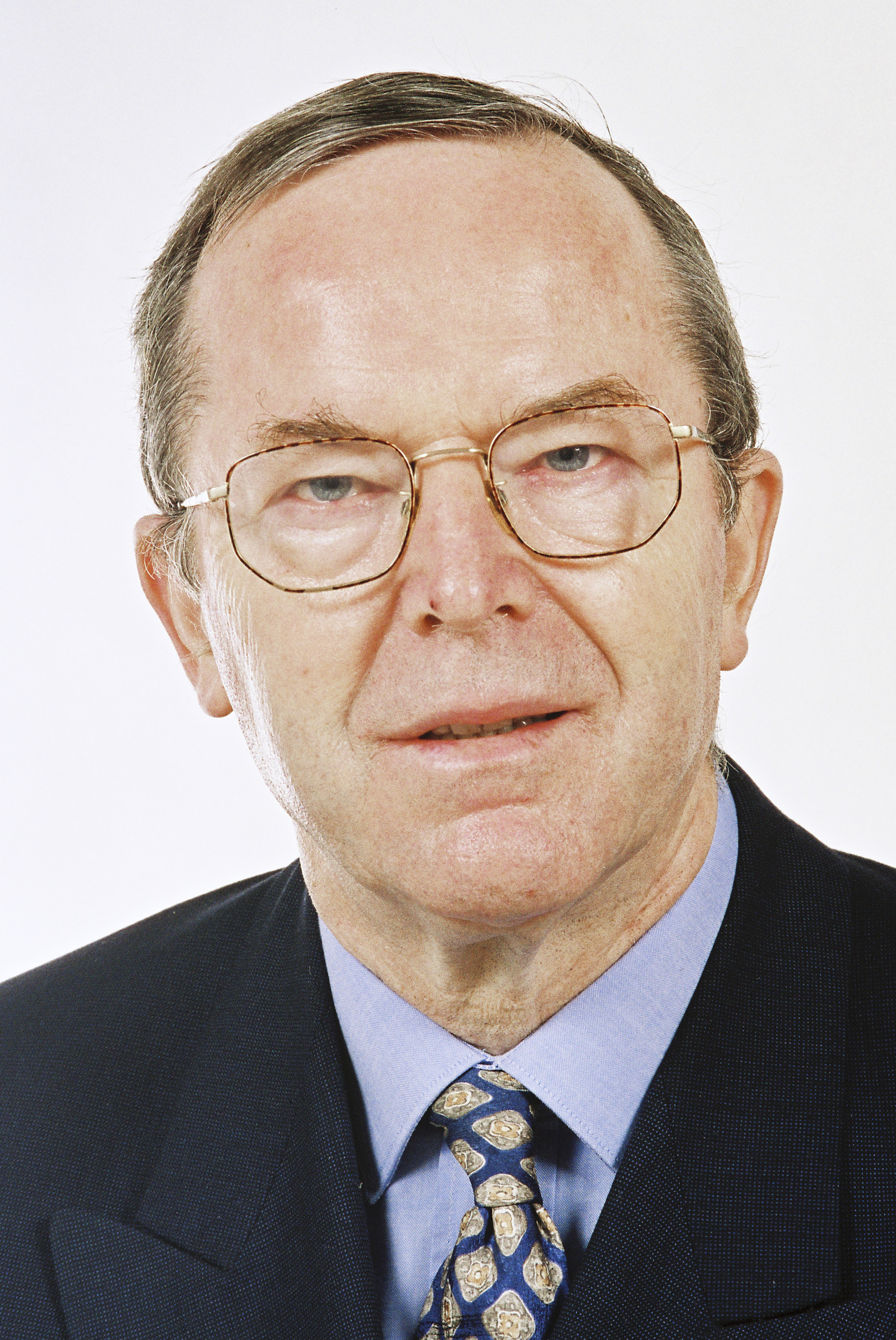
	Majority party	Minority party
Leader	Pauline Green	Wilfried Martens
Party	PES	EPP
Leader's seat	London North	Belgium (Dutch)
Last election	180	121
Seats won	198	157
Seat change	▲18	▲36
- Post-election composition of each member state's delegation

The 1994 European Parliamentary election was a European election held across the 12 European Union member states in June 1994.

This election saw the merge of the European People's Party and European Democrats, an increase in the overall number of seats (567 members were elected to the European Parliament) and a fall in overall turnout to 57%.

The five years which had passed since the previous election had seen enormous political upheavals across the continent. These changes included the end of communism in Europe, German reunification, the dissolution of the Soviet Union, the Velvet Divorce in Czechoslovakia and the breakup of Yugoslavia. The integration of five former East German states and Berlin into the Federal Republic of Germany had constituted the first physical expansion of the EC since 1986. The end of the Cold War meant three politically neutral states in Europe had begun a process of acceding to the EU that would culminate in the 1995 enlargement of the European Union. The EU itself had assumed its current name through adoption of the Treaty of Maastricht in 1993.

== Results ==
European Parliament election, 1994 - Final results at 18–21 July 1994
Group	Description	Chaired by	MEPs		
PES	Social democrats	Pauline Green	198		
EPP	Conservatives and Christian democrats	Wilfried Martens	157		
ELDR	Liberals and liberal democrats	Gijs De Vries	43		
EUL	Communists and the far left	Alonso José Puerta	28		
FE	Conservatives and Christian democrats	Giancarlo Ligabue	27		
EDA	National conservatives	Jean-Claude Pasty	26		
G	Greens	Alexander Langer; Claudia Roth	23		
ERA	Radicals, social liberals and regionalists	Catherine Lalumière	19		
EN	Eurosceptics	James Goldsmith	19		
NI	Independents	none	27	Total: 567	Sources:

Seats summary
PES	34.92%
EPP	27.69%
ELDR	7.58%
EUL	4.94%
FE	4.76%
EDA	4.59%
G	4.06%
ERA	3.35%
EN	3.35%
NI	4.76%

The Technical Group of the European Right no longer had enough MEPs to qualify as a Group, and its MEPs returned for the time being to the ranks of the independents. The members of the European Democrats joined the European People's Party (EPP), some as associate members such as the British Conservatives who did not wish to subscribe to the EPP's pro-federalist position. Despite the merger, the EPP failed one more to become the largest party; the Party of European Socialists once more claimed victory, with a 41-seat lead over the People's Party.

Forza Italia was elected for the first time in 1994; it formed its own shortlived group, Forza Europa, before this merged with the European Democratic Alliance a year after the election to become the Group Union for Europe. In addition to Forza Europa, another new group was founded following the fall of the European Right group: the Europe of Nations Group (Coordination Group)—the first Eurosceptic group in the Parliament, which lasted until 1996.

=== Results by country ===
The national results as at 9–12 June 1994 are as follows:

Group Nation	PES	EPP	ELDR	EUL	FE	EDA	G	ERA	EN	NI	Total
Belgium	3 PS; 3 SP	4 CVP; 2 PSC; 1 CSP	3 VLD; 3 PRL–FDF				1 ECOLO; 1 AGALEV	1 VU		2 VB; 1 FN	25
Denmark	3 A	3 C	4 V 1 B				1 SF		2 J 2 N		16
France	15 PS	13 UDF	1 UDF	7 PCF		14 RPR		13 MRG	13 UDF diss.	11 FN	87
Germany	40 SPD	39 CDU; 8 CSU					12 GRÜNE				99
Greece	10 PASOK	9 ND		2 KKE; 2 Synaspismos		2 PA					25
Ireland	1 Lab	4 FG	1 Ind.			7 FF	2 GP				15
Italy	16 PDS; 2 PSI	8 PPI; 3 Patto; 1 SVP	6 LN; 1 PRI	5 PRC	27 FI		3 FdV; 1 Rete	2 LP		11 AN; 1 PSDI	87
Luxembourg	2 LSAP	2 CSV	1 DP				1 Gréng				6
Netherlands	8 PvdA	10 CDA	6 VVD; 4 D66				1 GL		1 SGP; 1 GPV		31
Portugal	10 PS	9 PSD		3 CDU		3 CDS–PP					25
Spain	22 PSOE	28 PP; 2 CiU (UDC); 2 CN (EAJ)	2 CiU (CDC)	9 IU				1 CN (CC)			64
United Kingdom	62 LAB; 1 SDLP	18 CON; 1 UUP	2 LD					2 SNP		1 DUP	87
Total	198	165	35	28	27	26	23	19	19	27	567

=== Statistics ===
European Parliament election, 1994 - Statistics
Area	Dates	Seats	Electorate	Turnout	Previous	Next	Election methods	Sources
European Union (EU-12)	9, 12 June 1994	567	269,261,000	56.8%	1989	1995	All PR, except UK (not NI) which used FPTP	

European Parliament election, 1994 - Timeline
Third Parliament		1994 Election		Regrouping		Fourth Parliament	
Groups	Pre-elections May 30	Change	Results June 13	Change	Results July 19	New Groups	First session July 19
PES	198	+1	199	-1	198	PES	198
EPP	162	-14	148	+9	157	EPP	157
LDR	45	-2	43	+0	43	ELDR	43
LU	13	+0	13	+15	28	EUL	28
DR	12	+2	14	-14	27	NI	27
NI	27	+10	37	-10	27	NI	27
Others	0	+59	59	-13	19	EN	19
Others	0	+59	59	-13	27	FE	27
EDA	20	+4	24	+2	26	EDA	26
G	27	-5	22	+1	23	G	23
RBW	14	-6	8	+11	19	ERA	19
Total	518	+49	567	+0	567	Total	567

European Parliament election, 1994 - Delegation at 19 July 1994
Group	Description	Details	%	MEPs
PES	Social democrats	Germany 40, Belgium 6, Denmark 3, France 15, Ireland 1, Italy 18, Luxembourg 2, Netherlands 8, UK 63, Greece 10, Spain 22, Portugal 10	35%	198
EPP	Conservatives and Christian democrats	Germany 47, Belgium 7, Denmark 3, France 13, Ireland 4, Italy 12, Luxembourg 2, Netherlands 10, UK 19, Greece 9, Spain 30, Portugal 1	28%	157
ELDR	Liberals and liberal democrats	Belgium 6, Denmark 5, France 1, Ireland 1, Italy 7, Luxembourg 1, Netherlands 10, UK 2, Spain 2, Portugal 8	8%	43
EUL	Socialists and communists	France 7, Italy 5, Greece 4, Spain 9, Portugal 3	5%	28
NI	Independents	Belgium 3, France 11, Italy 12, UK 1	5%	27
FE	Conservatives and Christian democrats	Italy 27	5%	27
EDA	National conservatives	France 14, Ireland 7, Greece 2, Portugal 3	5%	26
G	Greens	Germany 12, Belgium 2, Denmark 1, Ireland 2, Italy 4, Luxembourg 1, Netherlands 1	4%	23
ERA	Liberals and liberal democrats	Belgium 1, France 13, Italy 2, UK 2, Spain 1	3%	19
EN	Eurosceptics	Denmark 4, France 13, Netherlands 2	3%	19
Sources:			100%	567

== Seat distribution ==
The number of seats in Parliament was increased from 518 to 567. The reason for this was the accession of the German Democratic Republic to the Federal Republic of Germany. The number of seats for the other larger states was also increased because the smaller states are entitled to a disproportionate number of seats compared to their population.

National Distribution of Seats
State	1989	1994	State	1989	1994
Germany	81	99	Belgium	24	25
United Kingdom	81	87	Portugal	24	25
France	81	87	Greece	24	25
Italy	81	87	Denmark	16	16
Spain	60	64	Ireland	15	15
Netherlands	25	31	Luxembourg	6	6

Until 1996 the number of seats was further increased to 626 to accommodate Austria, Finland and Sweden who were joining, holding elections in 1995 and 1996. They were granted 21,16 and 22 seats respectively.
