= Viale Luigi Borri =

Street in Varese, Italy

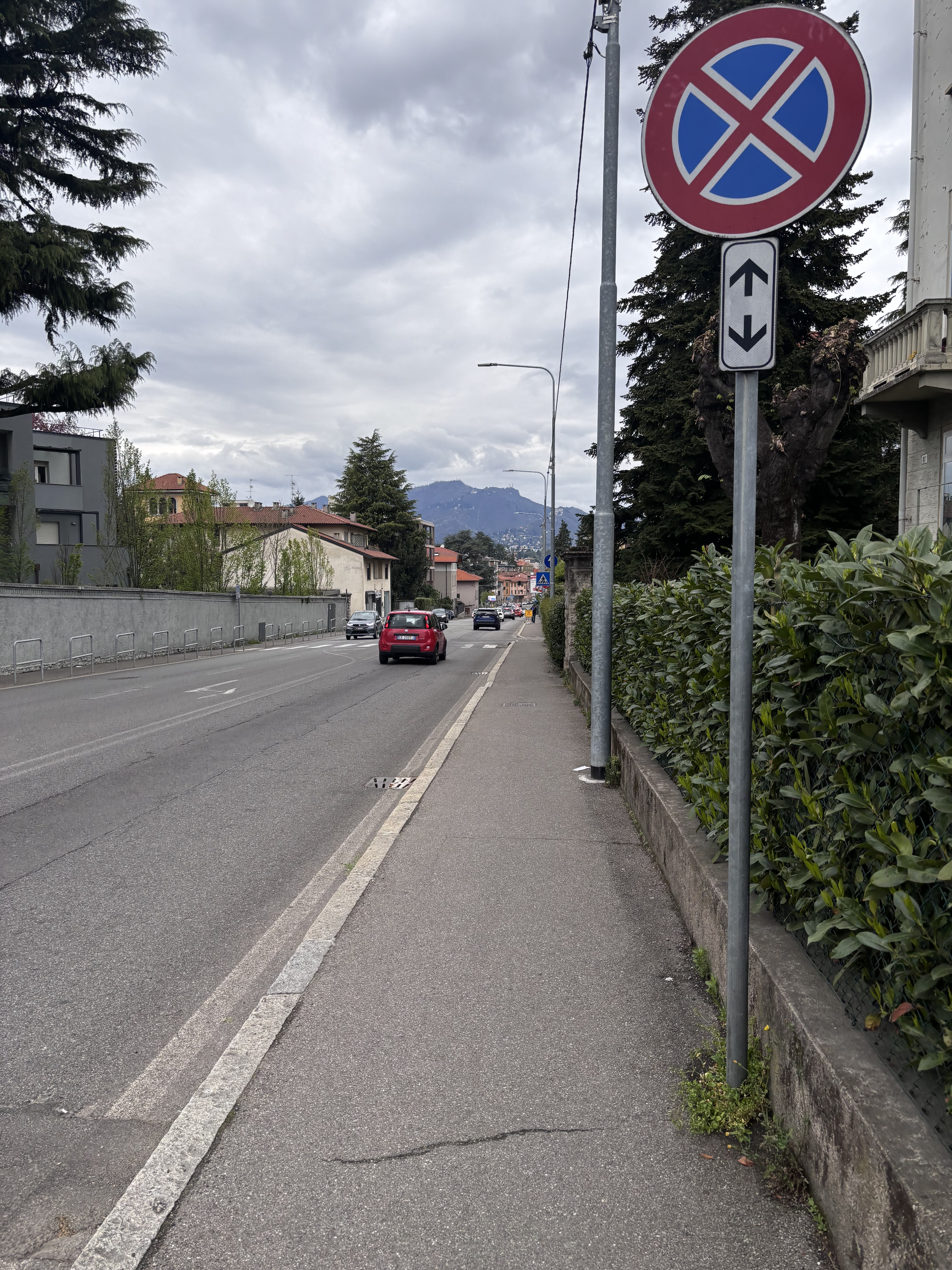
- Viale Borri in 2025; in the background you can see the Campo dei Fiori mountain
- Interactive map of Viale Luigi Borri
- Location: Varese, Italy
- Coordinates: 45.7938°N 8.8479°E
- From: Lozza

Other
- Known for: Ospedale di Circolo e Fondazione Macchi

Viale Luigi Borri (officially Viale Borri Luigi), or more commonly Viale Borri, is an important street in Varese, Italy.

From Largo Ennio Flaiano through the village of the neighborhood Bizzozero ends at the border of Lozza.

Includes the initial part of the Provincial Road 233 Varesina.

On this road lies the Ospedale di Circolo e Fondazione Macchi and Campus Bizzozero (University of Insubria).
