= Ospedale Filippo del Ponte =

- Azienda Ospedaliera Ospedale di Circolo e Fondazione Macchi di Varese
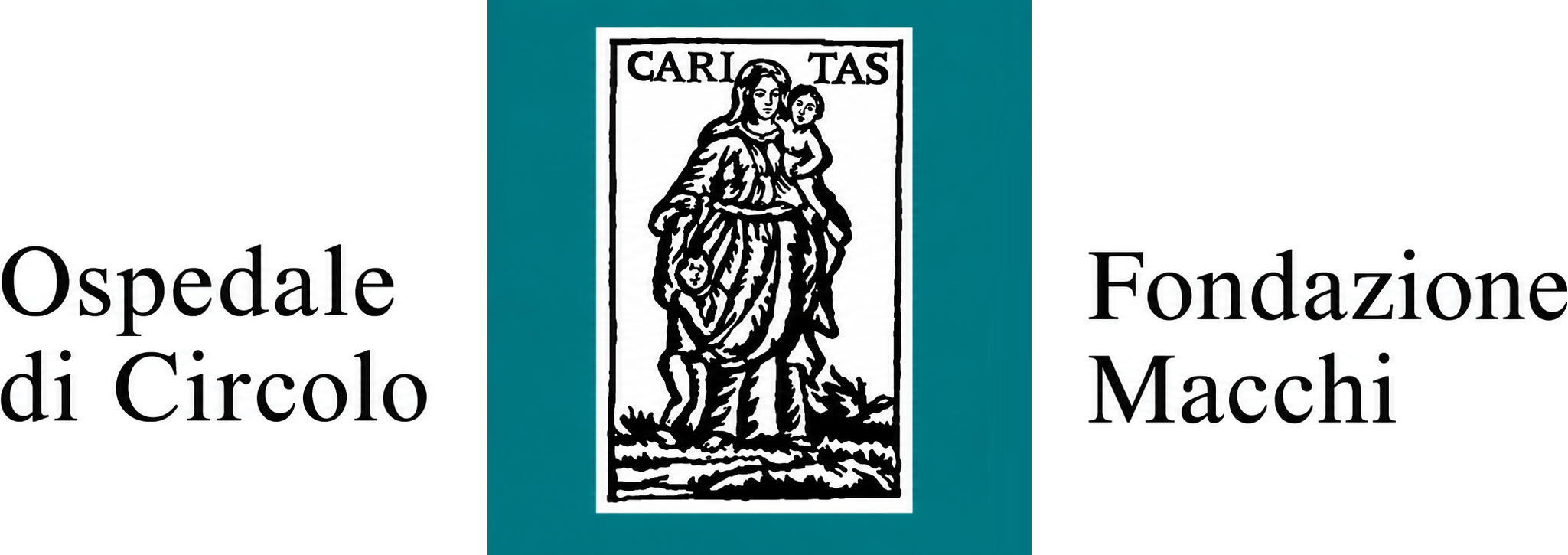

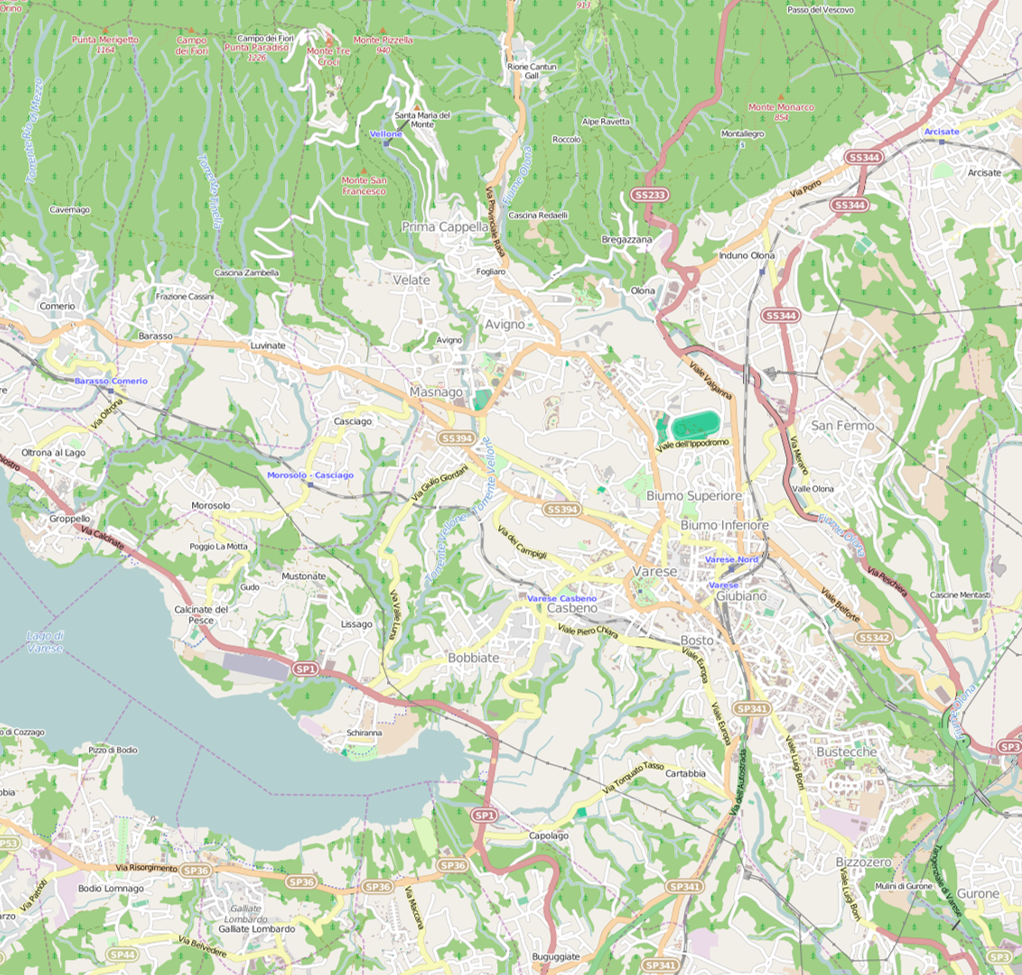
- Location within Varese

Geography
- Location: Via del Ponte, 19, Varese, Lombardy, Italy
- Coordinates: 45.815719°N 8.834444°E

Organisation
- Care system: National Health Service
- Type: Specialist
- Affiliated university: University of Insubria

Services
- Speciality: maternity, childcare

Helipads
- Helipad: No

History
- Founded: 1866

Links
- Website: www.ospedalivarese.net/ospedali/delponte-varese/
- Lists: Hospitals in Italy

The hospital Filippo del Ponte (Italian: Ospedale Filippo del Ponte) is a hospital of Varese, Italy. From November 2011 it has hosted the activities of the Maternal Infant of the Presidium of Varese. It is part of the Azienda Ospedaliera Ospedale di Circolo e Fondazione Macchi.

== History ==
The hospital was founded in 1866 by Filippo del Ponte. It has developed through its donation and work of the Order of the Hospitaller Brothers of Milan. It was expanded in 1959 thanks to the agreement between the Hospital and Fatebenefratelli.

== The hospital today ==
Today, the hospital is home of the activities of the Maternal Infant of the Presidium of Varese. Collaborates with the University of Insubria. Is undergoing major renovations that will transform the current structure into a high level center for Childcare in the North of Lombardy.
