= Davide Galimberti =

Italian politician

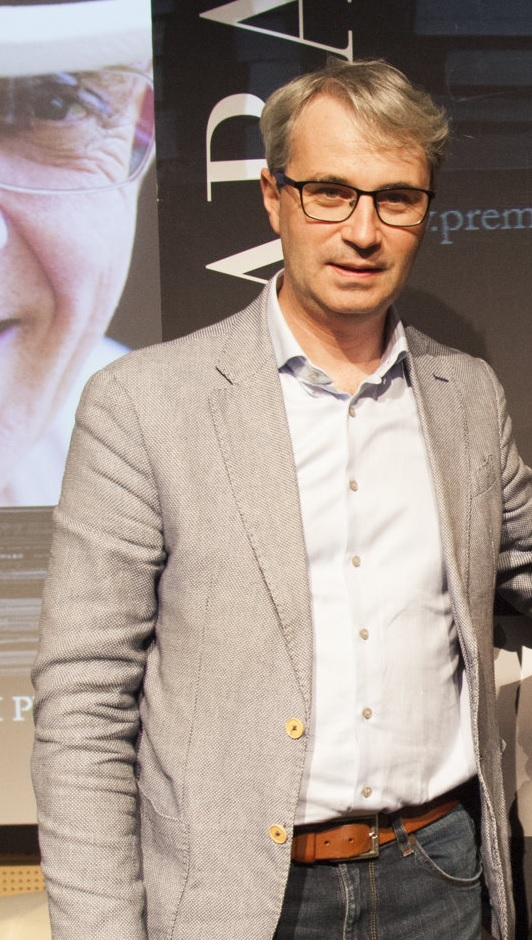
- Davide Galimberti attending the final event of "Premio Chiara" literary award 2019

Mayor of Varese
- Incumbent
- Assumed office 21 June 2016
- Preceded by: Attilio Fontana

Personal details
- Born: 19 April 1976 (age 50) Varese, Lombardy, Italy
- Party: Democratic Party
- Education: University of Insubria
- Profession: professor

Davide Galimberti (born 19 April 1976) is an Italian politician.

He is a member of the Democratic Party and was elected Mayor of Varese at the 2016 Italian local elections. He took office on 21 June 2016.

== See also ==
- 2016 Italian local elections
- List of mayors of Varese

Political offices
Preceded by Attilio Fontana	Mayor of Varese since 2016	Succeeded by
