= Claudio Azzolini =

Italian politician (1940–2025)

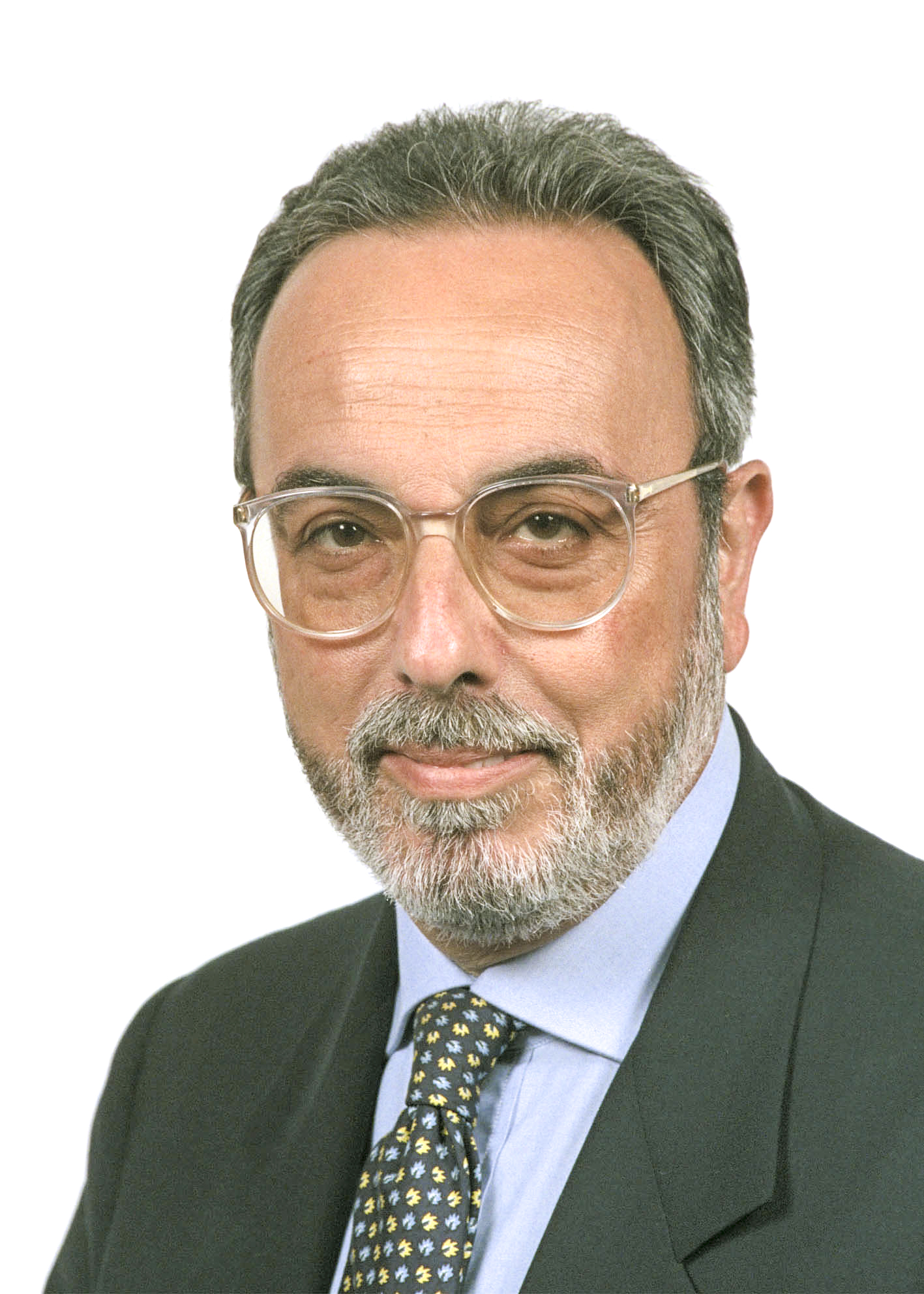
- Azzolini as Member of the European Parliament, 1994

President of the Union for Europe
- In office 10 December 1996 – 14 June 1998 Serving with Jean-Claude Pasty (1995–1999)
- Preceded by: Giancarlo Ligabue
- Succeeded by: Jean-Claude Pasty

Member of the Chamber of Deputies
- In office 30 May 2001 – 28 April 2008
- Constituency: Campania 1

Member of the European Parliament
- In office 19 July 1994 – 19 July 1999
- Constituency: Southern Italy

Personal details
- Born: 9 June 1940 Naples, Italy
- Died: 20 November 2025 (aged 85) Naples, Italy
- Party: Forza Italia
- Education: Degree in Tourism Sciences
- Alma mater: Nunziatella Military School
- Occupation: Journalist

Claudio Azzolini (9 June 1940 – 20 November 2025) was an Italian politician and journalist who served as a Member of the European Parliament and the Italian Chamber of Deputies.

== Early life and career ==
Born in Naples, Azzolini attended the prestigious Nunziatella Military School. He earned a degree in Tourism Sciences and worked as a journalist. Before entering politics, he held managerial positions at several major Italian companies, including Alitalia, ATI, Alfa Romeo, Aeritalia, and SPI.

== Political career ==
=== European Parliament ===
In 1994, Azzolini was elected to the European Parliament representing Southern Italy for Forza Italia. He served from 19 July 1994, to 19 July 1999. During this period, he held positions within parliamentary groups, including vice-president of the Union for Europe group from October to December 1996, followed by the presidency of the group from December 1996 to June 1998. He also served as vice-president of the Delegation to the EU-Malta Joint Parliamentary Committee from 1994 to 1997.

As the Forza Italia group leader, Azzolini oversaw the party's entry into the European People's Party (EPP) in 1998.

=== Chamber of Deputies ===
Azzolini was elected to the Italian Chamber of Deputies in the 2001 Italian general election, representing the Campania 1 constituency for the House of Freedoms coalition. During the XIV Legislature, he was President of the Italian Parliamentary Delegation to the Assembly of the Council of Europe from 2001 to 2006, and served as Vice President of the Parliamentary Assembly of the Council of Europe.

He was re-elected in the 2006 Italian general election and served in the XV Legislature until 28 April 2008.

== Death ==
Azzolini died in Naples on 20 November 2025, at the age of 85.
