= Alessandro Fontana =

Italian academician and politician (1936–2013)

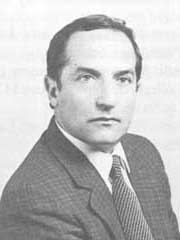
Alessandro Fontana

Alessandro Fontana (5 August 1936 – 4 December 2013) was an Italian academic and politician for the Christian Democracy Party who held several government posts and served in the European Parliament between 1994 and 1999.

== Biography ==
Fontana was born in Marcheno, Brescia, on 5 August 1936. He was an academic by profession.

Fontana joined the Christian Democracy Party. He served in the Italian Senate for two terms, from 1987 to 1988 and in 1992. He was appointed minister of university and scientific and technological research in 1992 to the cabinet led by Prime Minister Giuliano Amato. He served in the post for one year. Then he began to serve in the European Parliament, and his tenure lasted from 1994 to 1999 representing Christian Democratic Group, Group Union for Europe and Forza Europa Group. He was the head of the petitions committee during his tenure at the Parliament.

Fontana died on 4 December 2013.
