= Telecupole =

Italian television channel

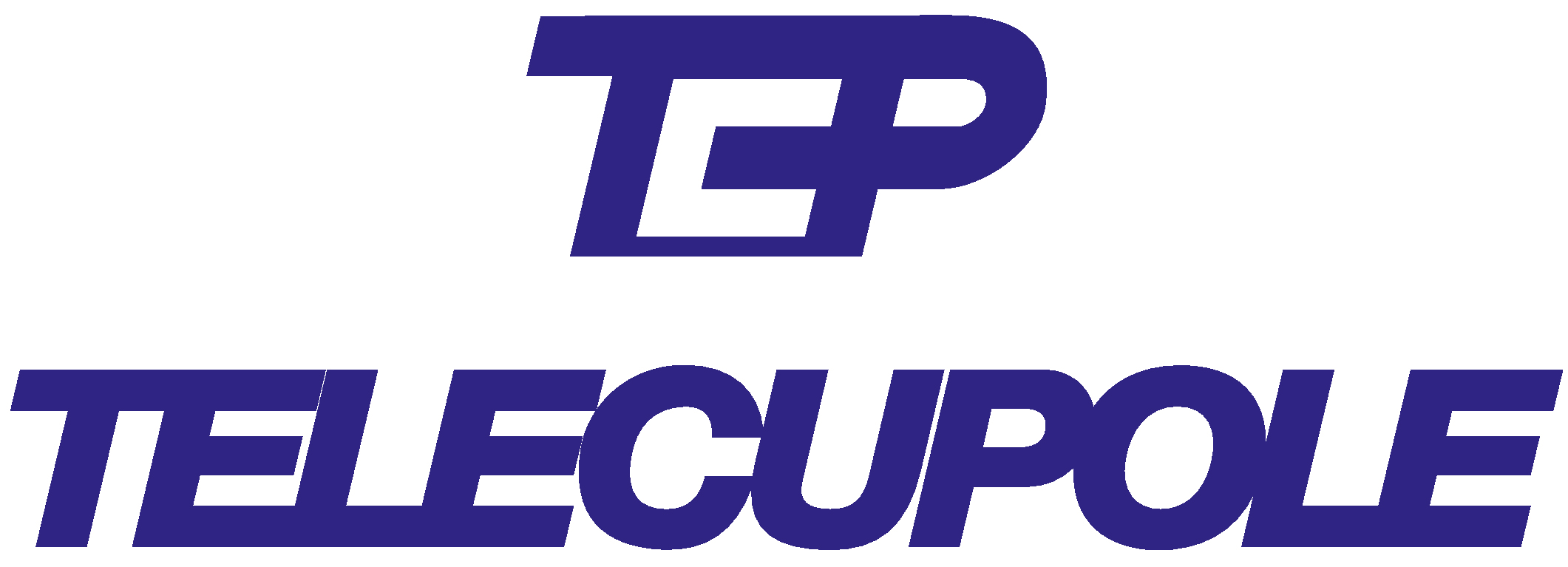
- Country: Italy
- Broadcast area: Piedmont

Programming
- Language(s): Italian
- Picture format: 16:9 SDTV

Ownership
- Owner: T.L.T. S.P.A.

History
- Launched: 1979

Links
- Website: http://www.telecupole.com/

Availability

Terrestrial
- DTT in Piedmont: LCN 11
- DTT in Liguria: LCN 19

Telecupole is a historic private Italian television broadcaster, one of the main in Piedmont. It broadcasts from Cavallermaggiore (CN), and is also received in Liguria and Lombardy. In the past it was part of the Jolly and Cinquestelle circuits.

== History ==
It was founded in 1979 by publisher Luigi Toselli with the collaboration of Danilo Pennone, who came from Telestudio, and until then artistic director of the "Le Cupole" disco Lorenzo Gillio. Only a few years later, the station became owned by the two brothers Luigi and Piermaria.

Already from the early 80s, Telecupole's line-up aimed at information, the territory, folklore and the valorization of local habits, customs, jobs and traditions, a distinctive feature of the station. The success was given by characteristic programs such as La Trattoria dei Ricordi, presented Meo Cavallero and Gipo Farassino which recovered the local dialect and popular singing, a nd Cantapiemonte, which featured Piedmontese vocal folklore groups, both shows created by Raoul, La bottega della musica with Tino Zerbini, the weekly segment Il corpo e l'anima presented Gianluigi Marianini, which is still repeated by sister channel Telecupole Story. Journalist Beppe Ghisolfi, in his turn, guided the interviews of Silenzio stampa. The main characters of the network's shows were, among others, Gipo Farassino, Nino Bonino and Umberto Clivio. The schedule also featured films, TV series and cartoons.

In later years, original productions are reducedand the station started airing the programs from the Jolly circuit, whereas by the late 80s it joined the Cinquestelle consortium.

In the 90s, the slots reserved for original productions, such as musical programs, returned to having a fundamental weight, such as Il discorriere, Fantastica serata and A gentil richiesta, the latter was a daily event with dance orchestras in the company of Bruno Garino, known by the stage name of "Martin". Also dating back to that period were the variety shows La cartolina dei ricordi, Premiato caffè, Simpaticamente... sotto a chi tocca, La notte è per i gatti, Profumo di caffè and Ciao bimbi, aimed at children. It is always with the aim of relaunching traditions that the constant presence of Piedmontese dialect comedy was seen on the Telecupole screens, as part of the Piemonte a teatro section, with actors from local vaudeville companies, and of an "amarcord" moment, called Prima serata, which included the best of the network's historical programmes.

In the 90s and 2000s, notable writer Bruno Gambarotta was in charge of the Agorà program, the service segments Video Piemonte, Detto tra noi, Alla scoperta del Piemonte and Obiettivo agricoltura also aired, sports insights from Massimo Corrado in Sport flash, and the football debates of Alè Toro!. Giuseppe Milanesio, alias "Pino Milenr", and Piero Montanaro two key faces of the station with the programs Saluti salutissimi, Scacciapensieri e Centopiazze, still on air. In the 2010s, some programs dedicated to young musicians and the music of the moment such as VideoTop and Snap, and the cooking-themed game show Cooking quiz. Other in-depth events that the station produced were TG4 Salute, a weekly column on medicine, health and well-being; Transalp, a strip created in collaboration with Alp Channel, Télé Grenoble, Télé 8 Mont Blanc and Télé Local Provence focused on the dialogue between the two sides of the Alps, Italian and French, with a bilingual presentation; and Turismo Cuneo, which highlighted the territory of the province of Cuneo, edited by Paolo Bongioanni.

Since the second half of the 2000s, one of the channel's most popular events has been the Ballando Le Cupole variety show, i.e. evenings based on ballroom dancing, popular songs and music revivals in general.

The news program, born at the beginning of the eighties with the direction of Beppe Ghisolfi, has since then been called TG4, like the competing news program of the same name from Quartarete TV. The various daily editions of TG4 mainly deal with news from all the provinces of Piedmont, but there is also space for salient events that have occurred in Liguria. The news program carries out various service features on the world of work, medicine, pensions, agriculture, the environment and local events, also including national and regional weather forecasts (in detail on Piedmont, Liguria and Lombardy).

According to Auditel data, in 2014, Telecupole was the second most-watched local television station in Piedmont and Aosta Valley (behind 7 Gold Telecity, which is in first place). Il risultato si ripete anche l'anno successivo, while in 2016, with a daily average of 143,735 viewers, it achieved first place in Piedmont. In 2017, it returned to second place.

=== Sister channels ===
With the transition to digital terrestrial, Telecupole broadcasts in Piedmont (tunable on channel 15) on a proprietary multiplex where two new channels are included: Telecupole Story, which re-proposes current and past programs taken from the archive of the flagship network, and Telecupole Music, an all-music channel focused on the repertoire of Italian orchestras, repeats the contents of Italianissima TV.

The group also owned a multiplex in Liguria, which carried Telecupole on channel 94 in the western part of the region.

Telecupole was also broadcast on frequencies belonging to other television operators: in fact, it was hosted in Piedmont in Rete 7's MUX (the signal almost entirely covered the region), in Liguria in Telenord's MUX (the signal reached the whole region), and in Lombardy on channel 119 in Telepace's MUX (receivable in the plains in the cities of Milan, Monza, Bergamo, Brescia, Pavia, Lodi, Cremona and part of the related provinces).

Due to the reduction in frequencies due to the liberation of the 700 MHz band, in March 2022, the Telecupole Story and Telecupole Music channels were definitively closed and the LCN numbers of the flagship changed: it currently connects throughout Piedmont to number 11 on the remote control and in Liguria (excluding the province of La Spezia) to number 19.

=== On satellite ===
Since 2017, the channel is also receivable by satellite on Sky channel 824 (845 from 2017 to July 2019) and Tivùsat channel 422
