= Santo Stefano, Bizzozero =

Church in Bizzozero, Varese, Italy

Coordinates: 45.7911°N 8.8435°E

Church of Santo Stefano
- Italian: Chiesa di Santo Stefano di Bizzozero
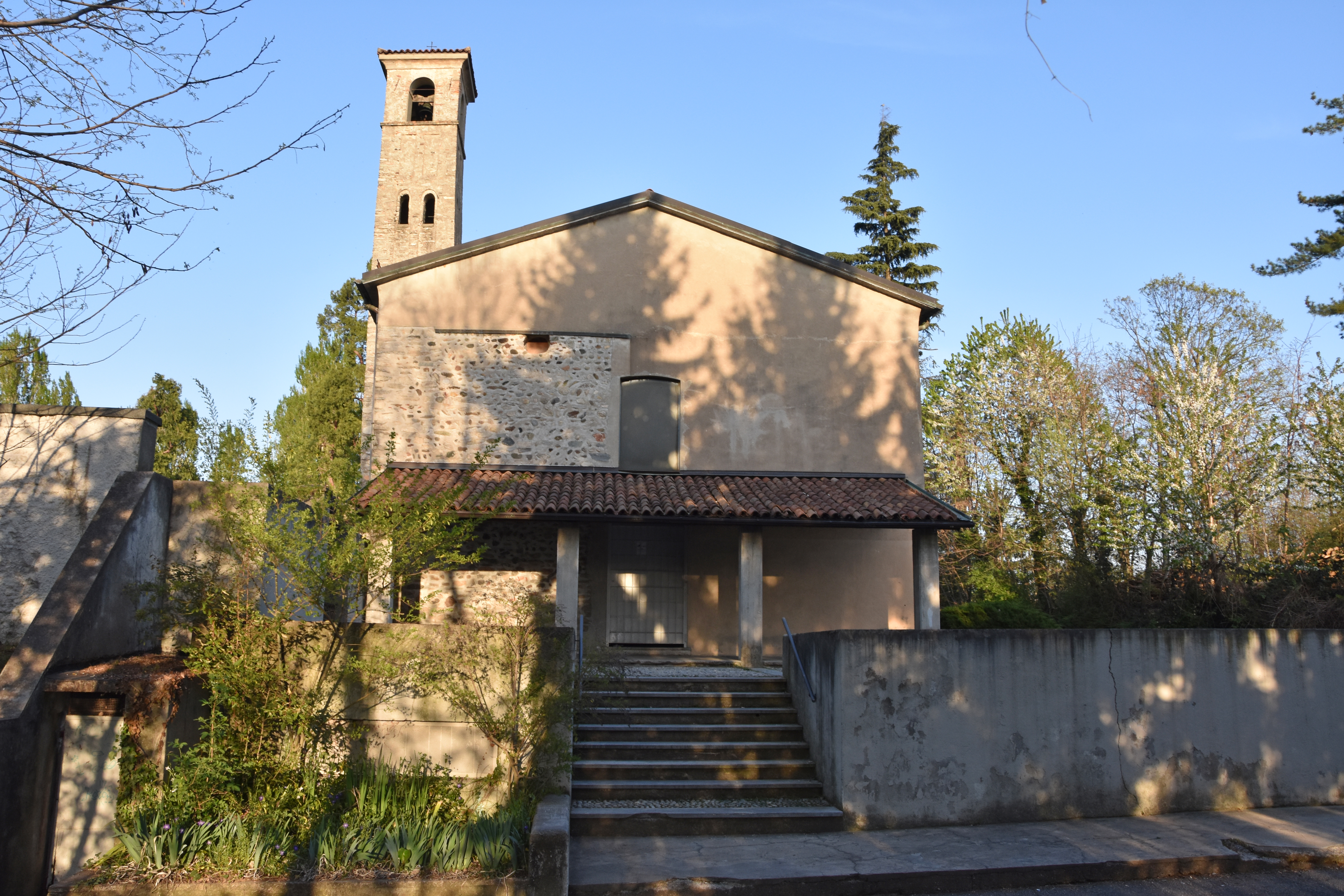
- Façade of the church
- Church of Santo Stefano
- Location: Bizzozero
- Country: Italy
- Denomination: Roman Catholic

History
- Founded: 8th century
- Dedication: Saint Stephen
- Dedicated: 8th century

Architecture
- Style: Romanesque
- Years built: 8th century-11th century, 1975

Administration
- Diocese: Diocese of Milan

The Church of Santo Stefano is a Roman Catholic Church, located in Bizzozero, frazione of Varese, Lombardy, Italy, built between the 8th and 11th century. It is a national monument.

== History ==
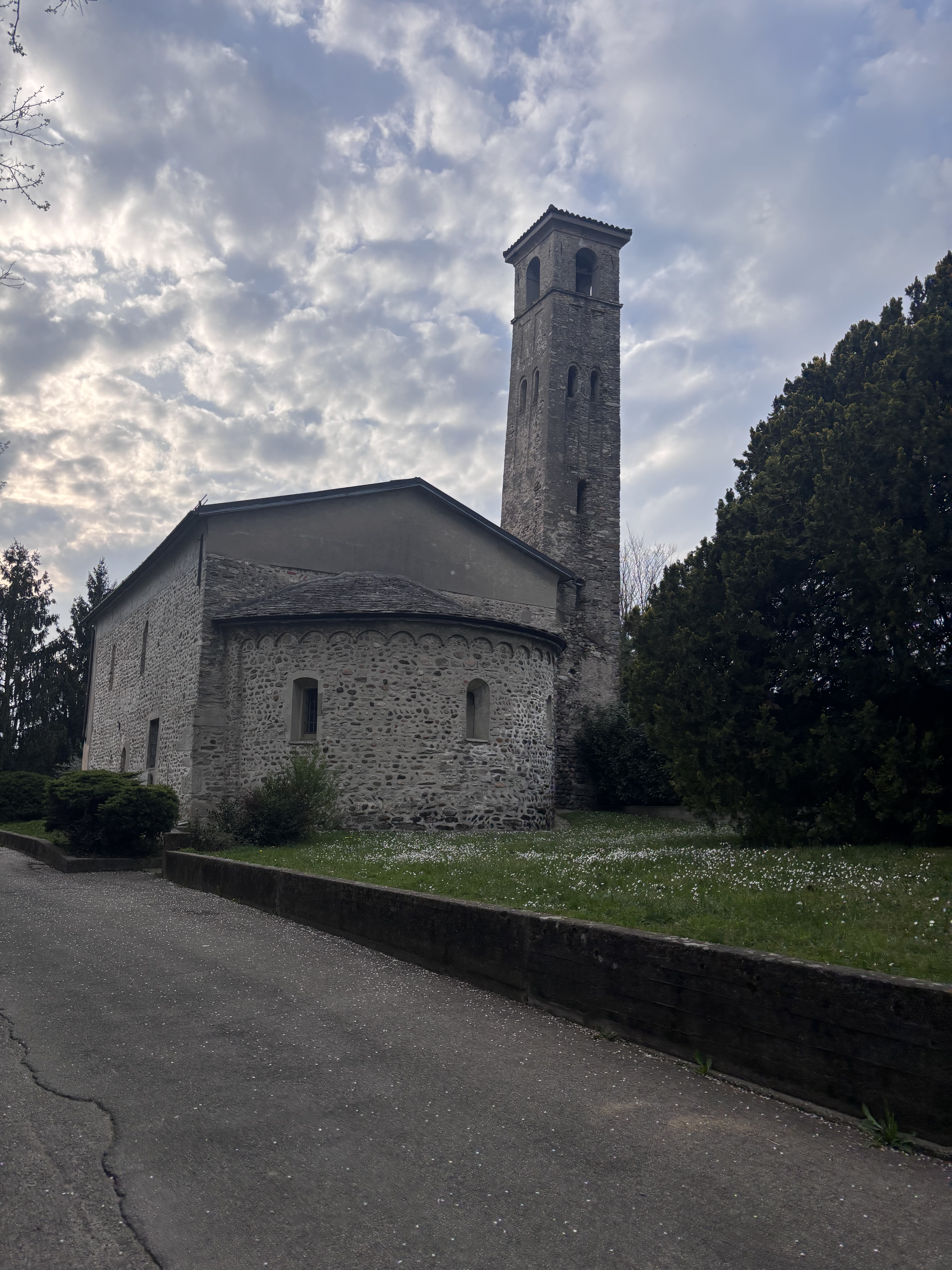
Rear view of the church

Construction of the church began in the 8th century, and concluded in the 11th century. The church’s interior was decorated in the 15th century. The church was constructed above a previous structure, possibly dating back as early as the 6th or 7th century. The bell tower dates from the 9th century. Parts of the church were constructed in 1347, when the Archbishop of Milan, Giovanni Visconti, granted it the title of chapel. The bell was placed in 1741.

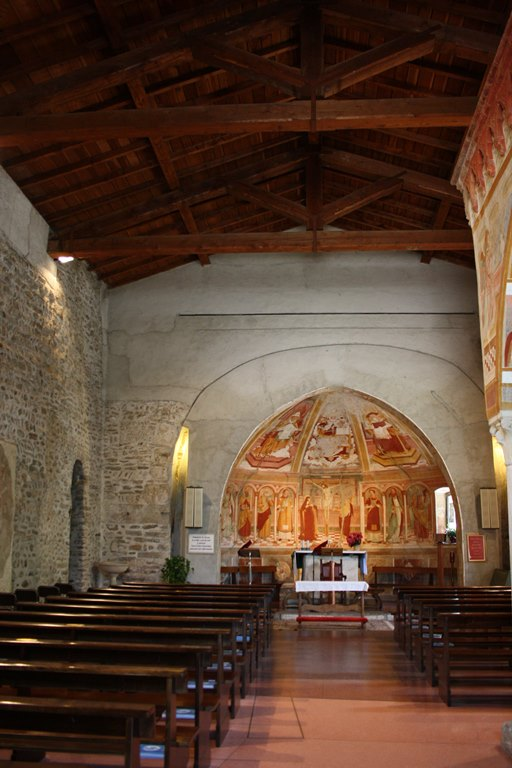
The interior

In 1490, the church became a parish church. The interior was decorated between 1490 and 1536, by several unknown artists, and by a Galdino of Varese. The abside of the church was decorated in 1536. The church is known for its altar, which is also decorated with frescos, and its ‘ciborio’ located at the entrance. Various other frescos date from the 14th century. The frescos depict various Saints, Prophets, Jesus Christ, and the Holy Mary.

The church was abandoned at some point after the 16th century, and was turned into a barn. In 1975, the church was bought and renovated, and was reopened to the public. The renovations were conducted by Silvano Colombo and Bruno Ravasi.

It is adjacent to the cemetery of Bizzozero.
