= List of mayors of Varese =

Mayor of Varese
- Sindaco di Varese

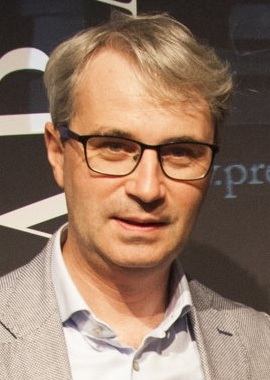
- Incumbent; Davide Galimberti (PD) since 21 June 2016
- Appointer: Electorate of Varese
- Term length: 5 years, renewable once
- Formation: 1861
- Website: Official website

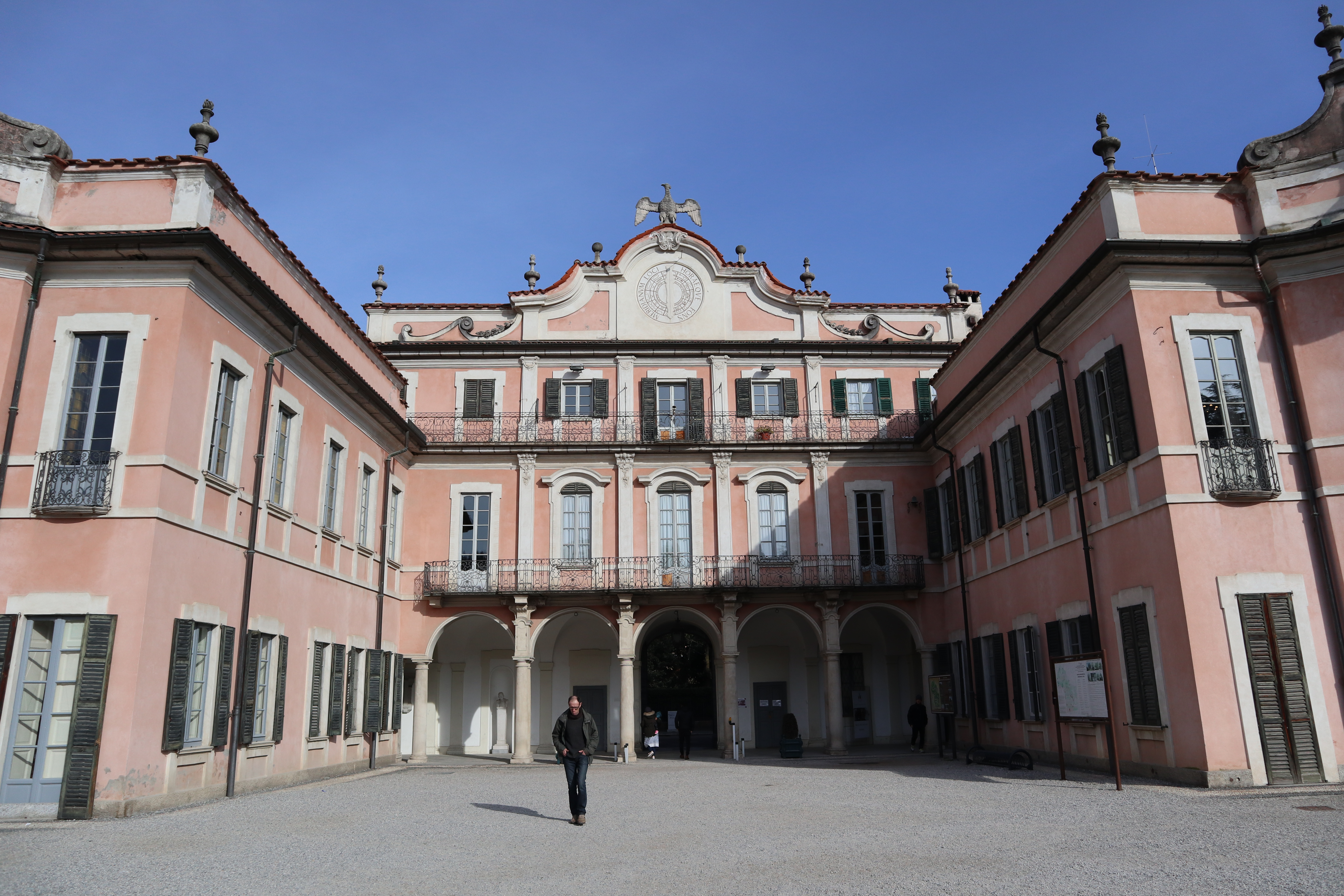
Palazzo Estense is Varese's City Hall

The mayor of Varese is an elected politician who, along with Varese's City Council, is accountable for the strategic government of Varese in Lombardy, Italy.

The current mayor is Davide Galimberti (PD), who took office on 21 June 2016.

== Overview ==
According to the Italian Constitution, the mayor of Varese is a member of the city council.

The mayor is elected by the population of Varese, who also elects the members of the city council, controlling the mayor's policy guidelines and is able to enforce his resignation by a motion of no confidence. The mayor is entitled to appoint and release the members of his government.

Since 1997, the mayor has been elected directly by Varese's electorate: in all mayoral elections in Italy in cities with a population higher than 15,000, the voters express a direct choice for the mayor or an indirect choice voting for the party of the candidate's coalition. If no candidate receives at least 50% of the votes, the top two candidates go to a second round after two weeks. The election of the city council is based on a direct choice for the candidate with a preference vote: the candidate with the majority of the preferences is elected. The number of seats for each party is determined proportionally.

== Republic of Italy (since 1946) ==
=== City Council election (1946-1997) ===
From 1946 to 1997, the mayor of Varese was elected by the City Council.

	Mayor	Term start	Term end	Party
1	Luigi Cova	1946	1951	PSI
2	Arturo Dall'Ora	1951	1956	Ind
3	Lino Oldrini	1956	1964	DC
4	Carlo Martinenghi	1964	1964	DC
5	Mario Ossola	1964	1978	DC
6	Giuseppe Gibilisco	1978	1985	DC
7	Maurizio Sabatini	1985	1990	DC
8	Luciano Bronzi	1990	1992	PSI
9	Angelo Monti	1992	1992	DC
Special Prefectural Commissioner tenure (1992–1993)
10	Raimondo Fassa	1993	1997	LN

=== Direct election (since 1997) ===
Since 1997, under provisions of the new local administration law, the Mayor of Varese has been chosen by direct election.

	Mayor of Varese	Took office	Left office	Party	Coalition	Election
11	Aldo Fumagalli (b. 1950)	1 December 1997	27 May 2002	LN	LN	1997
11	Aldo Fumagalli (b. 1950)	27 May 2002	11 October 2005 (Note: Resigned after a scandal which led him to be condemned for embezzlement.)	LN	LN • FI • AN • UDC	2002
Special Prefectural Commissioner tenure (11 October 2005 – 29 May 2006)
12	Attilio Fontana (b. 1952)	29 May 2006	31 May 2011	LN	LN • FI • AN • UDC	2006
12	Attilio Fontana (b. 1952)	31 May 2011	21 June 2016	LN	LN • PdL	2011
13	Davide Galimberti (b. 1976)	21 June 2016	20 October 2021	PD	PD	2016
13	Davide Galimberti (b. 1976)	20 October 2021 (Note: Election originally scheduled for June 2021 then postponed due to the coronavirus pandemic.)	Incumbent	PD	PD • IV	2021
