= Fiorella Ghilardotti =

Italian politician (1946–2005)

Fiorella Ghiladrotti
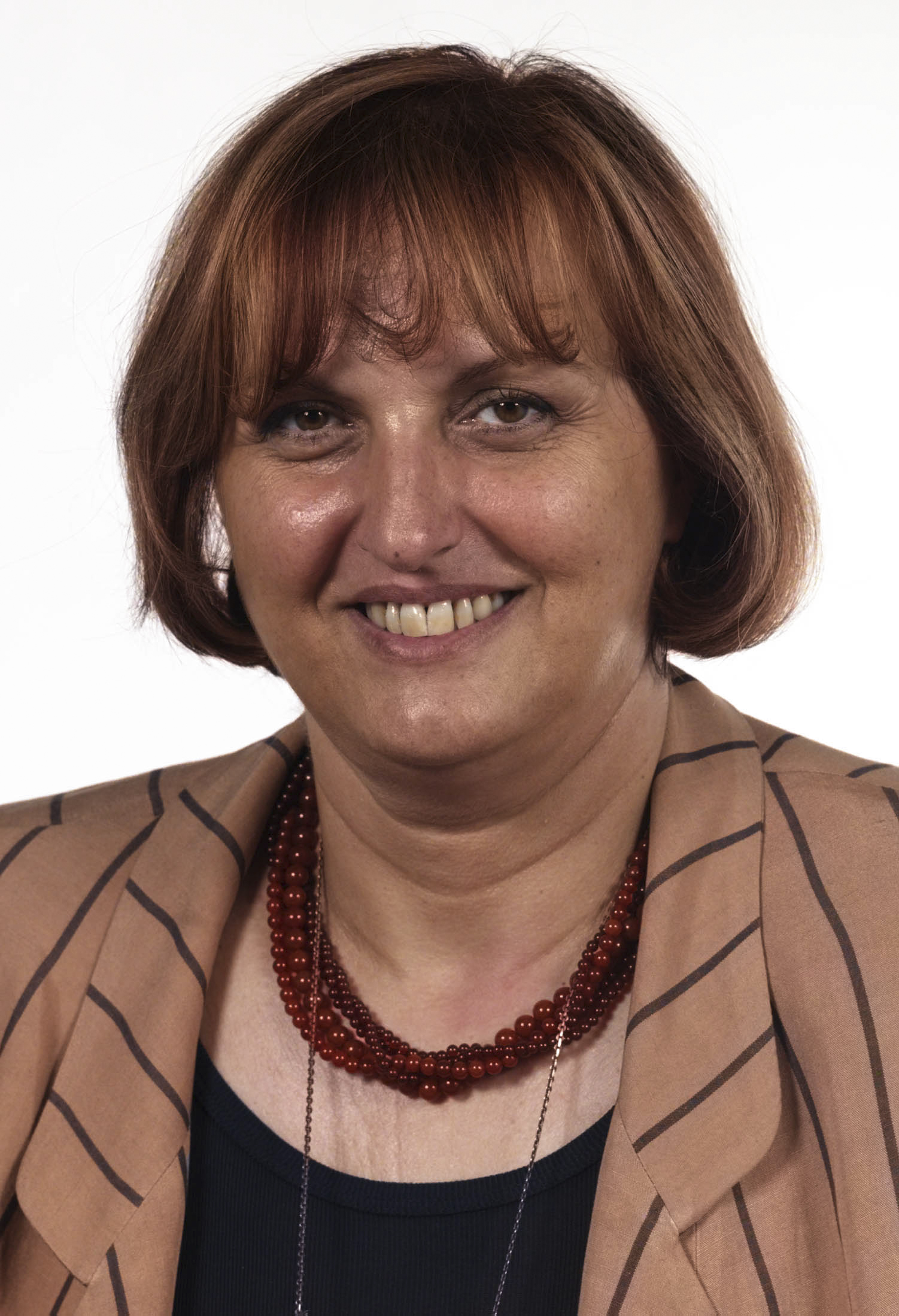
- Official portrait, 1999

Member of the European Parliament
- In office 19 July 1994 – 19 July 2004
- Constituency: North-West Italy

President of Lombardy
- In office 12 December 1992 – 4 June 1994
- Preceded by: Giuseppe Giovenzana
- Succeeded by: Paolo Arrigoni

Personal details
- Born: 25 June 1946 (age 80) Castelverde, Lombardy, Italy
- Died: 13 September 2005 (aged 59) Milan, Lombardy, Italy
- Citizenship: Italy
- Party: PDS (1991–1998); DS (1999–2005)
- Spouse: Sergio Graziosi
- Children: 2
- Education: Università Cattolica del Sacro Cuore
- Occupation: Trade unionist

Fiorella Ghilardotti (Italian pronunciation: [fjoˈrɛlla ɡilarˈdɔtti]; 25 June 1946 – 13 September 2005) was an Italian Democratic Party of the Left later Democrats of the Left politician and trade unionist who served two terms as a Member of the European Parliament (MEP) for the North-West Italy constituency from 1994 to 1999 and again between 1999 and 2004. She was the first female President of the Italian region of Lombardy from 1992 to 1994, was a regional councillor of the Regional Council of Lombardy from 1990 to 1992 and a member of the National Council for Economics and Labour late in her life. Ghilardotti has a room in the Pirelli Tower, an award, an association and a scholarship named after her.

== Biography ==
Ghilardotti was born in the small town of Castelverde in the province of Cremona, Lombardy, on 25 June 1946. She was the daughter of a bricklayer and had one brother. Following graduation from the Università Cattolica del Sacro Cuore with a Economics and Commence degree, Ghilardotti worked as a cultural operator for the ENAIP doing 150-hour courses in Milan during the early 1970s. She worked as a trade unionist from 1975, firstly at the Italian Federation of Metal Mechanics and then as secretary-general of the CISL in Milan from 1981 to 1990. During her period as a trade unionist, Ghilardotti not only dealt with metalworker and textile workers issues but also socio-health issues and training employees.

She was elected regional councillor of the Regional Council of Lombardy as an independent candidate of the Democratic Party of the Left (PDS) in 1990. Two years later, Ghilardotti was elected President of the Italian region of Lombardy, becoming the first woman to be appointed to the position. This followed the arrest of 12 councillors as a result of the Mani pulite scandal reducing credibility. She led a centre-left council, which was a minority receiving support from the Christian Democracy and the Italian Socialist Party parties as well as radicals. Ghilardotti was vice-president of the Committee of Regions between 1993 and 1994, and she remained President of Lombardy until 1994.

Standing for the Group of the Party of European Socialists (PES) at the 1994 European Parliament election in Italy, she was elected a Member of the European Parliament (MEP) for the North-West Italy constituency on 19 July 1994 with 57,391 preference votes. As an MEP, Ghilardotti frequently participated in legislative activity such as social legislation affecting the lives of the weakest members of the public and lobbying for women's rights in society and work. She was one of the MPs forming part of the Joint Assembly of the Agreement between the African, Caribbean and Pacific States and the European Union; Committee on Budgets; Committee on Women's Rights; and Delegation for relations with South Africa. Ghilardotti was a substitute for each of the Committee on Social Affairs and Employment, Committee on Employment and Social Affairs and Delegation to the EU-Malta Joint Parliamentary Committee.

On 1 January 1999, she became a member of the Democrats of the Left, and was president of the PES Women's Commission between 1997 and 2004. Ghilardotti was reelected to the European Parliament as a MEP for the North-West Italy constituency at the 1999 European Parliament election in Italy on 19 July 1999. She was a member of the Committee on Employment and Social Affairs; Committee on Women's Rights and Equal Opportunities; Members of the European Parliament to the Joint Parliamentary Assembly of the Agreement between the African, Caribbean and Pacific States and the European Union and Committee on Legal Affairs and the Internal Market. Ghilardotti was a substitute for both the Committee on Employment and Social Affairs and Committee on Industry, External Trade, Research and Energy.

She presented a report on the "gender budget" to the European Parliament when public budgets were analysed in a non-neutral manner by noting the responsibility and role gaps between men and women for the first time in 2003. Ghilardotti stood down as an MEP on 19 July 2004, and went back to politics in Italy and Milan, becoming a member of the National Council for Economics and Labour and head of labour problems as the PDS' Regional Secretariat. She was unavailable to stand for Mayor of Cremona in 2004 after her name was circulated for contention.

== Personal life and death ==
Ghilardotti was married to Sergio Graziosi, with whom she had two children. On the night of 13 September 2005, she died of a sudden illness in Milan. Ghilardotti was given a funeral at the Santa Maria dell'Incoronata in Corso Garibaldi in Milan.

== Legacy ==
The Ghilardotti Fund issued by the S&D Equality and Diversity Traineeship was established by the Progressive Alliance of Socialists and Democrats in 2004 and is awarded "to enable young people to gain practical experience in the areas of social rights and employment, women’s rights, anti-discrimination, equal opportunities and fundamental rights and freedoms. The candidate of this fund must prove his/her personal commitment (NGOs), professional experience or studies in the fields mentioned above." The annual Fiore Award was first awarded in her name in early 2006, and a scholarship in Ghilardotti's name was set up by the Fiorella Ghilardotti Association in December 2006 to "support the delicate transition from middle school to high school" in Italy.

In December 2009, the circle of the Democrats of the Left of Cassina de' Pecchi was named after her. A working room on the fifth floor of the Pirelli Tower in Milan was named in dedication after her in a plaque unveiling ceremony held in December 2015.
