= Bizzozero =

Frazione of Varese, Italy

Coordinates: 45°47′27″N 8°50′57″E

Bizzozero Biggioeugiar
- Frazione
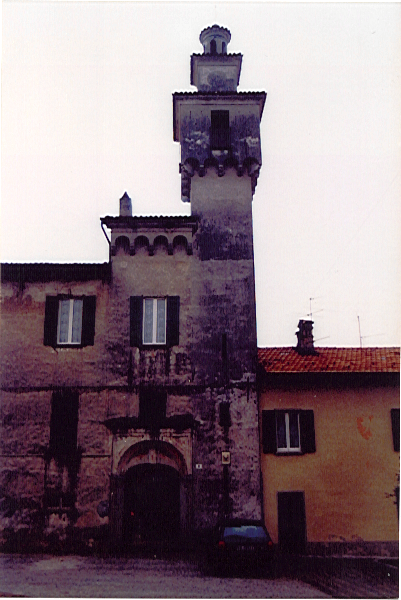
- The Tower of Bizzozero
- Interactive map of Bizzozero
- Country: Italy
- Region: Lombardy
- City: Varese

Population (1994)
  - Total: 3,511
- Demonym(s): Bizzozerese (singular), Bizzozeresi (plural)

Bizzozero (Biggioeugiar in the Varesino dialect), is a frazione of the comune of Varese, Lombardy, Italy. It was an independent comune until 1927, when it became a frazione of Varese, after it was nominated ‘Capoluogo’ of the Province of Varese.

== Etymology ==
The name Bizzozero comes from the medieval noble family of the same name, originally from Valle Olona, and ruled Bizzozero during the medieval period. The family's castle is still present today.

== History ==
=== Prehistoric Era ===
A prehistoric tomb, found in 1881 in Bizzozero, dated from the 3rd century BC, indicated the presence of the Insubres, a population of Celtic origin, who resided in the area. The tomb contained various pieces of jewellery, such as bracelets, and a jar. The presence of the Insubres was confirmed after more stone tombs were found.

=== Roman Era ===
In the 2nd century BC, after the conquest of Varese by the Romans, a settlement was established in Bizzozero. In the 18th century, a series of tombs were found by Nicolò Sormanni, prefect of the Biblioteca Ambrosiana of Milan. The Roman presence in Bizzozero can be confirmed with a series of roads, still existent today, passing by the Church of Santo Stefano.

=== Medieval and Contemporary Era ===
The first documents mentioning Bizzozero date from the 10th century, and between the 8th and 11th centuries, the Church of Santo Stefano was constructed. The church, which was renovated in 1975, is now a national monument. In the 16th Century, parts of the Bizzozero Castle were constructed, including the tower, with further renovations made in the 18th Century. The church of Bizzozero, dedicated to Saints Evasius and Stephen was constructed in the 15th century, and subsequently reconstructed at the end of the 17th century, and renovated in 1911. By 1859, Bizzozero had a population of 813, and in 1865, Bizzozero’s first mayor was elected. On 24 November 1927, Bizzozero became a frazione of the Comune of Varese, with a population of 1,537. From 1907 to 1950, Bizzozero served as a stop in the tramline of Varese.

== Monuments ==
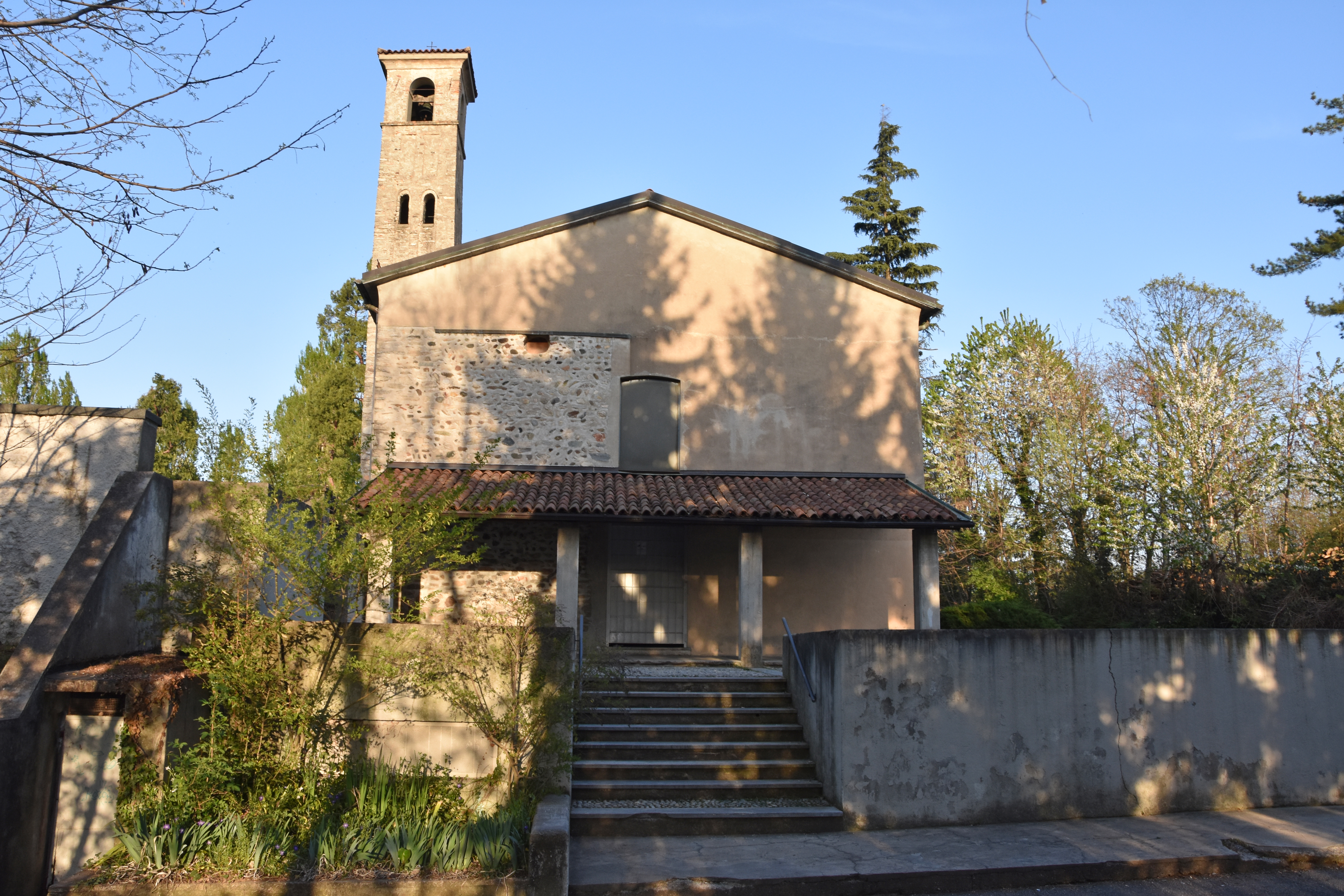
Church of Santo Stefano

- The Church of Santo Stefano - a Roman Catholic Church and national monument, it was constructed between the 8th and 11th century, and the interior was decorated in the 15th century. The church, for many years, was abandoned and was restored in 1975 by Silvano Colombo. It is adjacent to the Cemetery of Bizzozero.

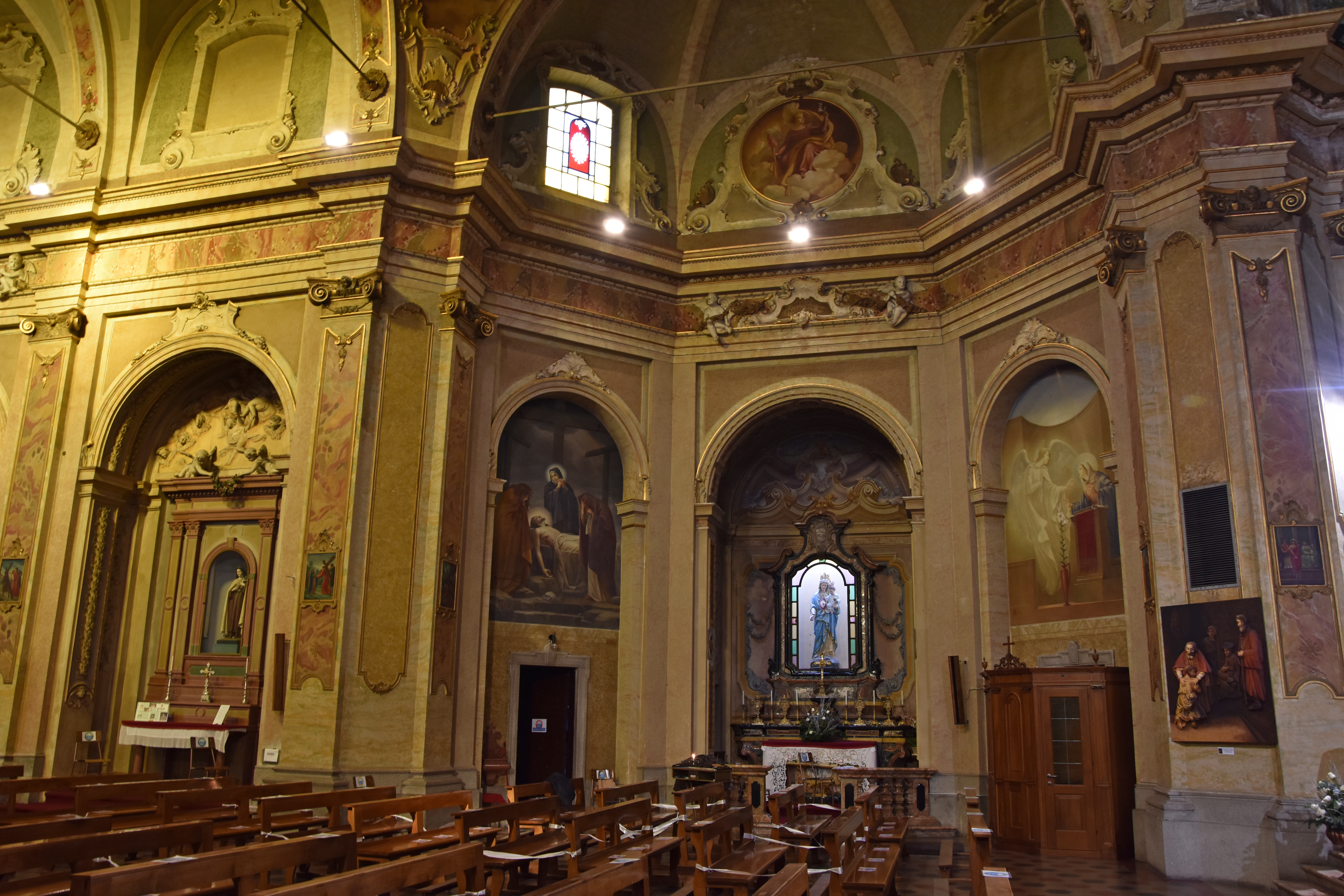
The interior of Saints Evasius and Stephen

- The Parish Church of Saints Evasius and Stephen - a Roman Catholic Church, which, since the 15th century, has served as the parish church of Bizzozero. The current structure dates to the late 17th century, and replaced a previous 15th-century church. The church was renovated in 1911 by architect Don Enrico Locatelli and was funded by the parish priest, Don Antonio Canziani. The bell tower was constructed in 1844, with the bells added in 1848.

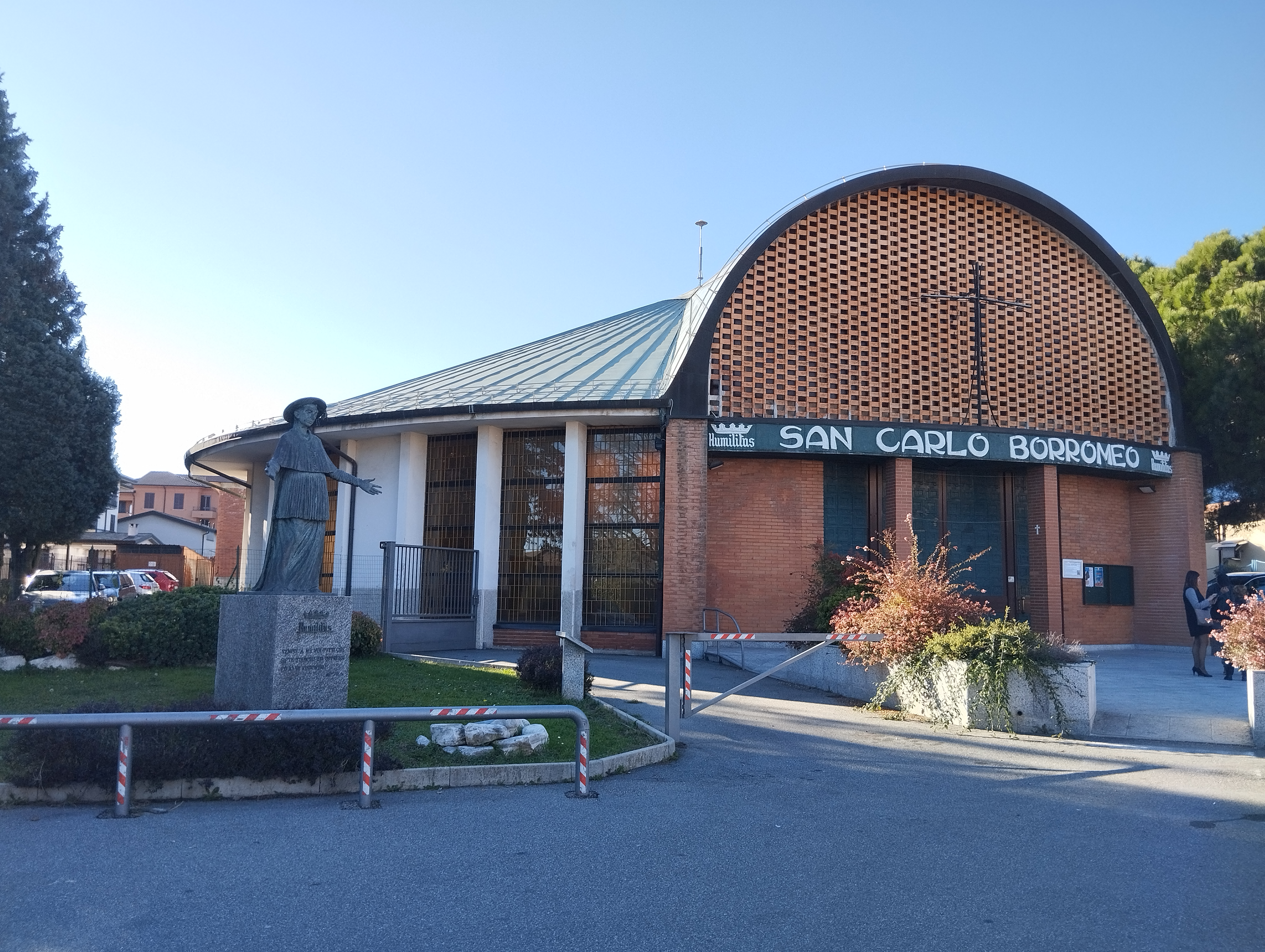
The church of San Carlo Borromeo

- The Parish Church of San Carlo Borromeo - a Roman Catholic Church, which, since 1961, has been the parish church of the neighbourhood of San Carlo, located to the north of Bizzozero, along Viale Borri. The church was constructed between 1960 and 1961 and was designed by Giorgio Clerici, and has a circular shape. The founding stone of the church was blessed by the then Archbishop of Milan, Giovanni Battista Montini, the future Pope Paul VI. The church was subsequently consecrated by Mons. Francesco Rossi in 1961, and Archbishop of Milan, Giovanni Colombo, in 1966. A statue of San Carlo Borromeo was erected outside the church in 1982, and blessed by Mons. Bernardo Citterio. The first parish priest was Don Gianni Brambilla, who served as parish priest from 1961 until his death in 2012.
- The Church of Santa Maria Maddalena - a Roman Catholic Church located in the neighbourhood of San Carlo, previously located in the neighbourhood of Saints Evasius and Stephen. It contains a rare and important painting by Francesco Cairo. The church was constructed in the 18th century, at the wish of the brothers Giovanni Battista and Gerolamo Grandi. Until the 1950s, the church was a part of the Cascine della Maddalena, owned by the Nicora, Vedani, Rossi, Ambrosini, and Mai families.
- The Tower of Bizzozero - a civic tower dating back to medieval times, located in the main town square. Probably constructed in 1500 and renovated in 1700, it is one of the oldest buildings in Bizzozero. It is adjacent to the castle of Bizzozero.
- The Castle of Bizzozero - a small castle located near the main town square, and adjacent to the tower of Bizzozero. The current structure dates back to the 14th or 15th century and was probably built over a previous castle, possibly dating back to the Longobardic period. It was the house of the noble Bizzozero Family.

== Society ==
=== Associations ===
- Circolobizzozero (Society for labourers, founded in 1877)
- Club Bizzozero (founded in 1976)
- Amici di Bizzozero (Friends of Bizzozero, founded in 2017)
- Pallacanestro Bizzozero
- Società Sportiva Bizzozero
