= Gipo Farassino =

Italian singer, songwriter, musician and politician (1934–2013)

- Farassino in 1994
- Born: 11 March 1934; Turin, Piedmont, Italy
- Died: 11 December 2013 (aged 79); Turin, Piedmont, Italy
- Occupations: Singer; songwriter; musician; politician
- Years active: 1961–2013
- Musical career
- Genre: Folk
- Instruments: Vocals; guitar
- Label: Polydor

Giuseppe "Gipo" Farassino (11 March 1934 – 11 December 2013) was an Italian singer, songwriter, musician and politician.

== Biography ==
As a songwriter Farassino produced more than 30 albums and virtually 50 singles. Most of his songs were in Piedmontese language and were directly inspired by French chanson and chansonniers. Farassino, who was also active as an actor, obtained his first major success in 1968 with Avere un amico, a collection of his most well-known songs in Italian. Contextually, Farassino became a friend of Fabrizio De André and started to be active in the Italian Communist Party (PCI).

Having abandoned the PCI and having endorsed more and more Piedmontese nationalism, Farassino first joined the Piedmontese Union, founded and led by Roberto Gremmo (another former Communist), and later was the founder and leader of the "Piedmontese Autonomist Movement" in 1987. The party, which took the name of "Autonomist Piedmont", was soon involved in the formation of a federation of Northern Italian regionalist parties, Lega Nord, and was transformed into Lega Nord Piemont (LNP). Farassino, who would be the "national" secretary of the LNP until 1996, was elected to the Chamber of Deputies in the 1992 general election. Having been defeated in a Senate single-seat constituency in the 1994 general election, he was elected to the European Parliament in the 1994 European Parliament election. He did not stand for re-election in 1999 and briefly left politics. Farassino was finally regional minister for Piedmontese Identity from 2004 to 2005.

== Discography ==
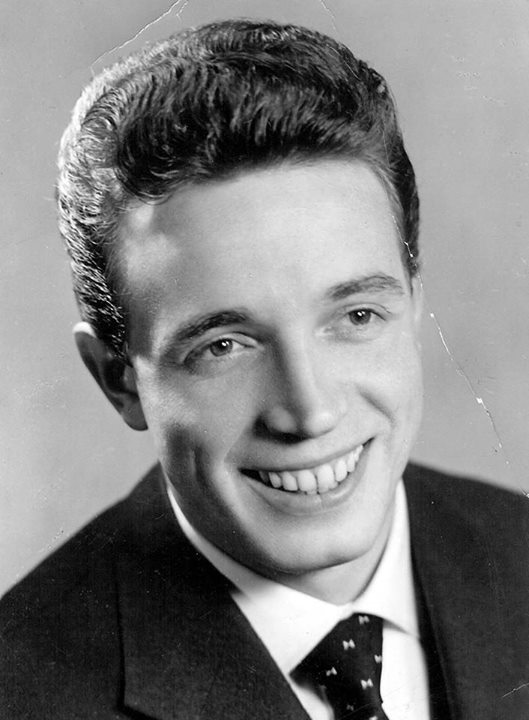
Farassino in 1954

Solo

- Le canssôn d' Porta Pila (1962) (with Riz Samaritano)
- Le canssôn d' Porta Pila n° 2 (1962)
- Le canssôn d' Porta Pila n° 3 (1963)
- Mè cit Turin.. (1963)
- Le canssôn 'd la Mole (1964) (with Gianni Cucco & Carlin Sachett)
- Milano canta... (1964) (with El Barberin & Mauro Cipolla)
- Auguri (1967)
- Avere un amico (1968)
- Due soldi di coraggio (1969)
- Gipo a só Turin (1970)
- Ij bogianen (1972)
- Uomini, bestie e ragionieri (1972)
- Aria di casa mia (1973)
- C'è chi vole e chi non pole: grassie listesso (1973)
- Guarda che bianca lun-a - Gipo canta Brofferio (1974)
- La patria cita (1974)
- Mantello, stivali e coltello (1975)
- Me car Artuf (1975)
- Ij mè amor dij 20 ani (1976)
- Per la mia gente (1977)
- Turin bel cheur (1979)
- N'aptit da sonador (1982)
- Piemonteis (1985)
- 1996 (1996)
- Ridatemi Amapola (1998)
- Ritratto d'artista (1998)

== Sources ==
- Monti, Giangilberto; Di Pietro, Veronica (2003). Dizionario dei cantautori. Garzanti. p. 209. ISBN 9788811740353.
- Gambarotta, Bruno; Ortona, Sandro; Roccia, Rosanna; Tesio, Giovanni (2004). Torino: il grande libro della città. Edizioni del Capricorno. p. 443. ISBN 978-88-7707-034-0.
- Emanuelli, Massimo (2004). 50 anni di storia della televisione attraverso la stampa settimanale. Milan: Greco & Greco. p. 235. ISBN 9788879803465.
