= Raimondo Fassa =

Italian politician

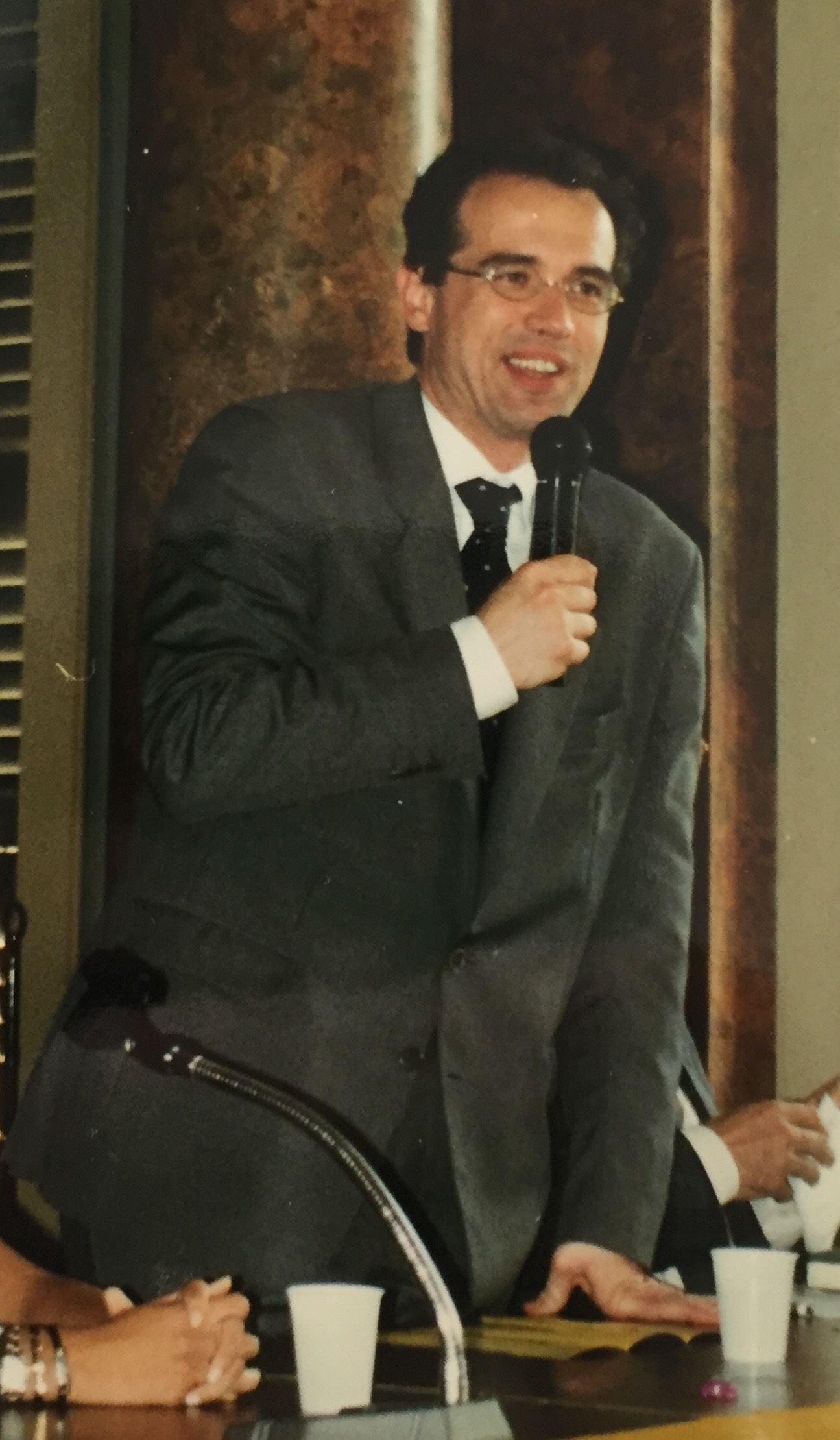
Raimondo Fassa

Raimondo Fassa (born 18 July 1959) is an Italian lawyer, professor and politician who served as Mayor of Varese (1993–1997) and member of the European Parliament (1994–1999).
