= Ospedale di Circolo e Fondazione Macchi =

- Azienda Ospedaliera Ospedale di Circolo e Fondazione Macchi di Varese
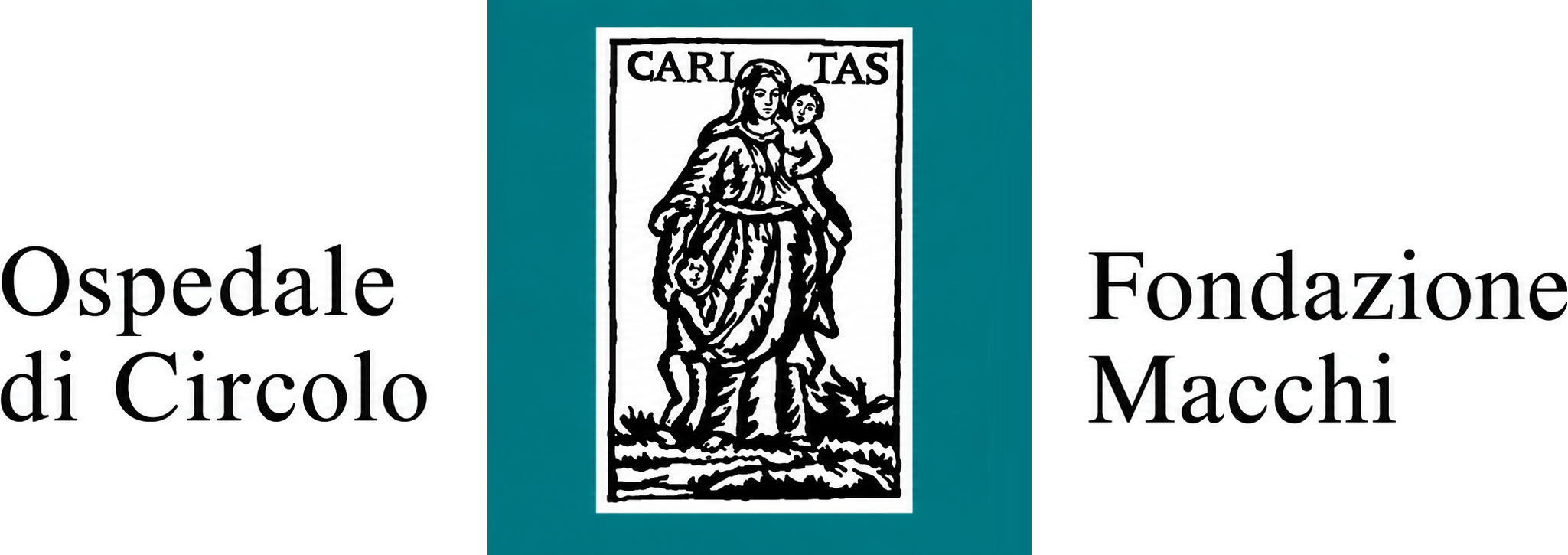

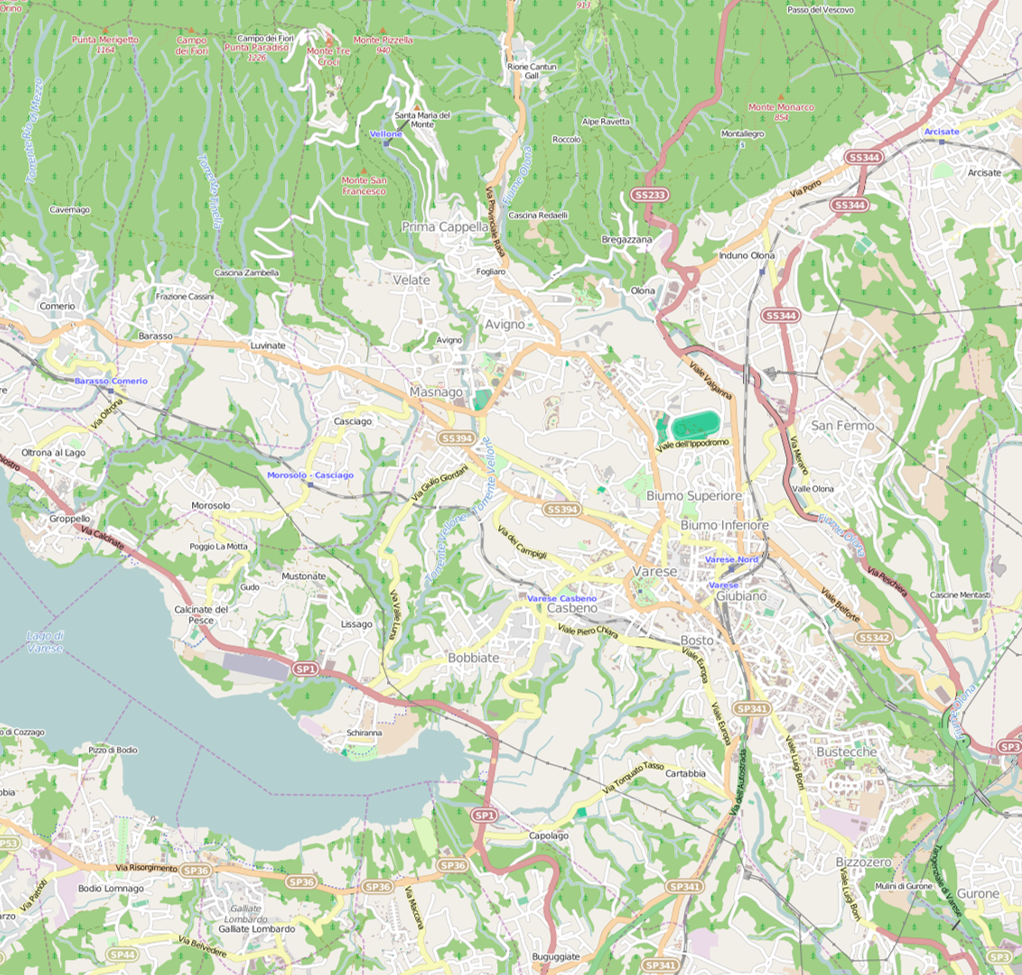
- Location within Varese

Geography
- Location: Viale Luigi Borri, 57, Varese, Lombardy, Italy
- Coordinates: 45.807442°N 8.841345°E

Organisation
- Care system: National Health Service
- Affiliated university: University of Insubria

Helipads
- Helipad: Yes

History
- Founded: 1173

Links
- Website: http://www.ospedalivarese.net/
- Lists: Hospitals in Italy

The Circolo Hospital and Macchi Foundation (Italian: Ospedale di Circolo e Fondazione Macchi) is the largest hospital of Varese, Italy.

Since 1995 is a hospital of national importance and high specialization.

In 1975 it hosted the second faculty of Medicine of the University of Pavia, later incorporated in the new University of Insubria.

== History ==
The Hospital has existed for 800 years: the first settlement dates back to the hospital in 1173 in the hills of Bosto for work of a religious community dedicated to helping the poor and mentally ill. In the '400 was created the military hospital and later the Hospital of St. John the Evangelist. In the '500 was born the Hospital of the Poor, in the center of the village, then merged into Civic or Places united, until 1848, when Varese could get 93 beds for hospitalization. Since '800, Varese became a place of meetings and studies by eminent scientists and clinicians: Sacco, Bizzozero, Riva Rocci and Golgi. In 1929 the hospital settled in its present location: the park of the villa of the tenor Francesco Tamagno.

== The hospital today ==
It is a recognized hospital of national importance and high specialization since 1995. Since 1998, the Hospital is home of the clinical three-year and Clinical Microbiology and Biochemistry, Faculty of Medicine of the University of Insubria established in that year. In March 2007 it was inaugurated the new block. Moreover, it is home of the Department of Clinical and Experimental Medicine - DMCS of the University of Insubria.
