= Union for Europe =

Former conservative political group of the European Parliament

- European Parliament group
- Name: Union for Europe
- English abbr.: UFE
- French abbr.: UPE
- Formal name: Group Union for Europe
- Ideology: Conservatism
- Political position: Centre-right
- From: 6 July 1995
- To: 20 July 1999
- Preceded by: Forza Europa; European Democratic Alliance
- Succeeded by: Union for Europe of the Nations
- Chaired by: Jean-Claude Pasty; Giancarlo Ligabue (1995–96); Claudio Azzolini (1996–98)
- MEP(s): 34 (5 May 1999)

The Union for Europe (UFE) was a conservative political group that operated in the European Parliament from 1995 to 1999. At its height in May 1999, it had 34 MEPs and it only existed during the European Parliament's 4th term.

UFE was formed as a merger of two political groups, the European Democratic Alliance and Forza Europa. Its members were the Forza Italia (FI) of Silvio Berlusconi, French Rally for the Republic (RPR), Irish Fianna Fáil, Portuguese CDS – People's Party, and Greek Political Spring. After the 1999 European Parliament election, UFE expanded into the Union for Europe of the Nations group. However, parties such as FI and RPR opted to join the European People's Party.

== Members ==
Country	Name		Ideology	MEPs
Italy	Forza Italia	FI	Liberal conservatism Populism	25 / 87
France	Rally for the Republic	RPR	Gaullism; Liberal conservatism	14 / 87
Ireland	Fianna Fáil	FF	Irish republicanism Conservatism	7 / 15
Portugal	CDS – People's Party	CDS–PP	Christian democracy Right-wing populism	3 / 25
Greece	Political Spring	PA	National conservatism Populism	2 / 25
