= University of Insubria =

University in Como and Varese, Italy

Coordinates: 45.8146°N 8.8255°E

- Università degli Studi dell'Insubria
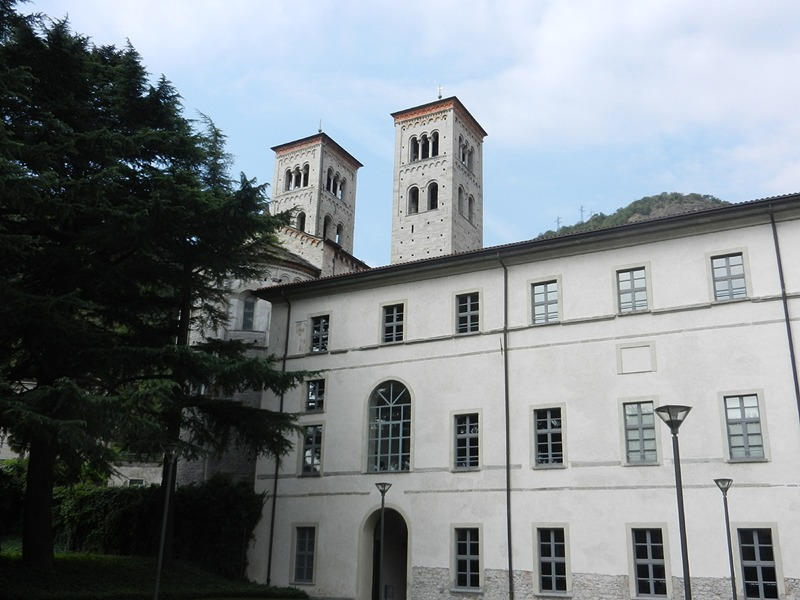
- Latin: Universitas Studiorum Insubriae
- Motto: Chiaramente Insubria! (Clearly Insubria!)
- Type: State-supported
- Established: 14 July 1998
- Rector: Prof. Maria Cristina Pierro, Vicary: Prof. Umberto Piarulli
- Students: 11.414
- Location: Como, Varese, Saronno and Busto Arsizio, Italy
- Sports teams: CUS dei Laghi (www.cusdeilaghi.it)
- Website: www.uninsubria.eu/ Sito ufficiale

The University of Insubria (Italian: Università degli Studi dell'Insubria) is an Italian university located in Como and Varese, with secondary locations in Busto Arsizio and Saronno. It was founded in 1998, it has been named after the area where it is situated, the historical-geographical region of Insubria.

According to the ranking made by Il Sole 24 Ore in 2011, the University of Insubria places itself 16th out of the 58 state-supported Italian universities and third in Lombardy after Politecnico di Milano and University of Pavia.

The Faculty of Law in Como has passed from the 9th to the 6th place in the CENSIS 2010/2011 Faculty of Law table. In 2013 the Faculty of Law was ranked 7th place nationally, with a rating of "AAA", within the list drawn up by the "Great University Guide" prepared by the newspaper La Repubblica, in collaboration with Censis (was in 4th place in 2011 and the 6th place in 2010).

== History and profile ==
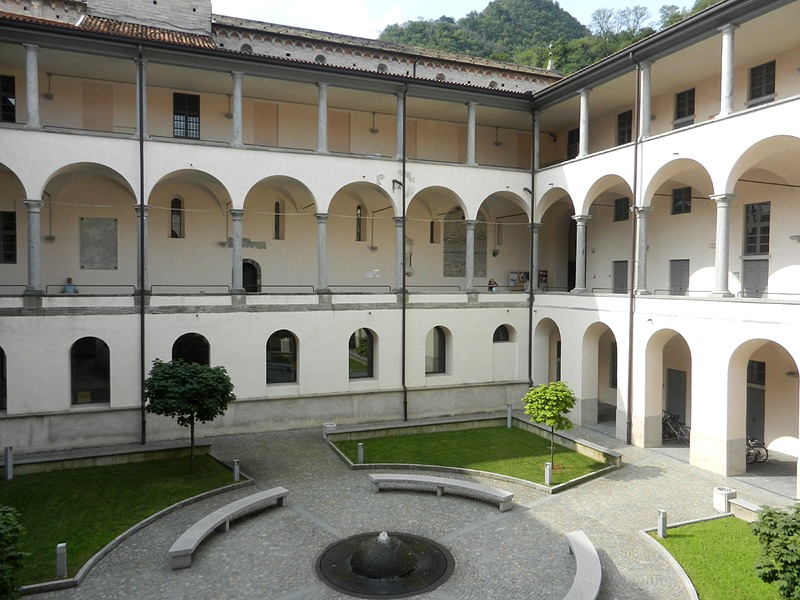
Basilica of Sant'Abbondio cloister, home of the Department of Law, Economics and Cultures of Insubria University

The University of Insubria, which includes two main sites, in Como and in Varese, was incorporated on 14 July 1998, but the institution which thus became a university had earlier origins. In 1972, a University Centre had been established in Varese as an extension of the Faculty of Medicine of University of Pavia followed in 1990 by an extension of the Faculty of Mathematical, Physical and Natural Sciences and of the Faculty of Economics of the University of Milan. In 1989, a University Centre had been established in Como as an extension of the Engineering Faculty of the Politecnico di Milano university and of the Faculty of Mathematical, Physical and Natural Sciences of the University of Milan.

In Como, during the fifteenth century at the College of Chartered Jurisconsults, there was a University School with three chairs: Moral Theology (active since 1473), Mixed Canon Law (founded in 1656 by Thomas Verga) and Institutions (founded in 1656 by Francesco Benzi). This university remained active until 1795.

Since 1989, indeed, Como has been the centre for regular degree courses in Engineering which arose precisely from the Politecnico of Milan, as well as in Science and since 1994 in Law, which originated from the University of Milan.

In the frame of Governmental reform designed to solve the problems of overcrowded universities in Italy, plans were made to establish new universities, some of which had to include a network of sites.

In 1996–1997, the Osservatorio Nazionale, the Italian national office for the assessment of the university system, visited the facilities in the university sites in Como and Varese, where other Faculties had been opened in the meantime and suggested that a new university featuring an organisation based on two Delegacies should be opened.

In Italy, this was one of the first proposals aimed at establishing a university network. The new University of Insubria is in a large centre of population and has close cultural and academic relationships with the universities of Milan and Pavia, upon which it is based, as well as with the other universities in the Insubria territory, including the Canton Ticino (Switzerland).

The University of Insubria acquired full status on 14 July 1998. The newly established university, which is anchored to the traditions of the Insubria territory, is the first example of a network-based organisation as suggested by the Osservatorio Nazionale in its assessment of the Italian University system.

The University of Insubria implied a radical change in the local historical development, which was socially and economically expensive because the territory was organised as a suburb of the city of Milan, and horizontal connections were inadequate for the population's growing needs. Today more than 7,000 students no longer commute between Varese and Milan or Como and Milan.

== Sites ==
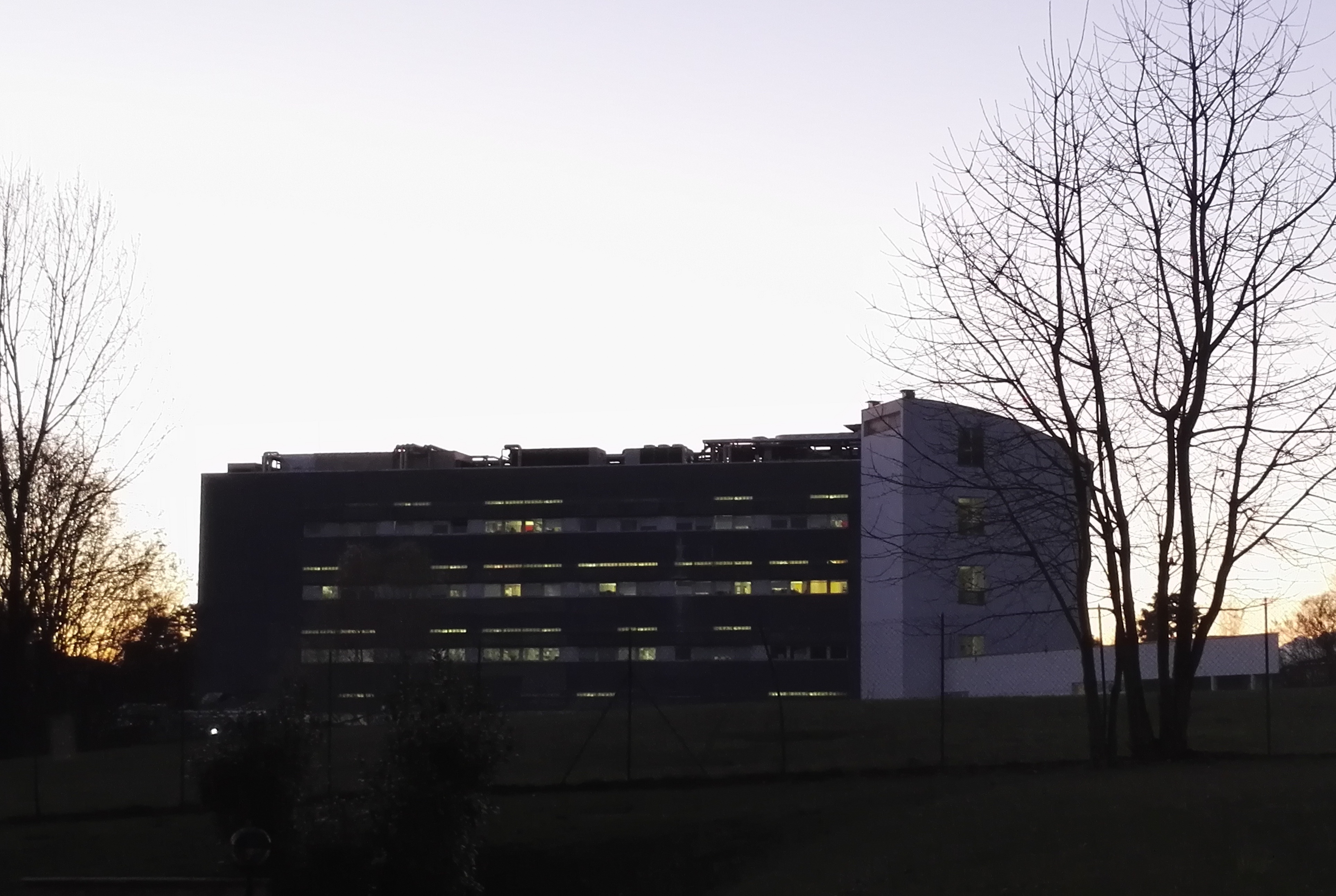
Department of Biotechnology and Life Sciences (DBSV) at the University of Insubria, Varese, Italy

Overall, Insubria University counts two main sites, educational facilities and laboratories in different locations of the Lombard territory.

The two main institutional sites are actually Como and Varese.

According to the Statute, laid down on 11 March 2002, the two sites just mentioned have equal dignity: the university ensures equal development, harmonic and fair, encouraging common initiatives and the integration of both the didactic and research activities.

In Varese at present there are the sites of:

- Via Ravasi, 2 - 21100 Varese
- Via J.H. Dunant, 3 - 21100 Varese
- Via Ottorino Rossi, 9 - 21100 Varese
- Via Monte Generoso, 71 - 21100 Varese

In Como you can find the following sites:

- Via M.E. Bossi, 5 - 22100 Como
- Viale Felice Cavallotti, 5 - 22100 Como
- Via Valleggio, 11 - 22100 Como
- Via S. Abbondio, 12 - 22100 Como

Of particular historic and artistic interest should be surely noticed the Cloister of the Basilica of Sant'Abbondio in Como (among the oldest in Europe and used at first as a convent, then as an Episcopal Seminary), already home of the Faculty of Law, now of the Department of Law, Economics and Cultures (DEC), the most notable centre of the entire University, and the Palazzo Natta, ancient palace of a noble family belonging to the aristocracy of Como dating back to the sixteenth century, with details dating back even to the thirteenth century, headquarters of the rectorate.

Further didactic facilities are Saronno (VA) and Busto Arsizio (VA).

There are also other locations where you may find laboratories, offices and premises in the provinces of Como and Varese.

The main university hospital is the Ospedale di Circolo e Fondazione Macchi in Varese. Villa Toeplitz, Varese, houses the headquarters of the Faculty of Communication Sciences of the University of Insubria.

== Didactics ==
There are about 10.000 students attending the academic year 2014/2015.

=== Degree Courses ===
"Insubria Courses". Archived from the original on 2023-07-04.

Courses	Bachelor's Degree courses (3 years); Biological Sciences, VARESE; Biotechnology, VARESE; Chemical Sciences and Technologies, COMO; Communication Sciences, VARESE; Computer science, VARESE; Economics and Management, VARESE; Engineering for Work and Environment Safety, VARESE; Environmental and Natural Sciences, VARESE; Linguistic and Cultural Mediation, COMO; Physics, COMO; Mathematics, COMO; Movement science, SARONNO; Tourism Management, COMO; Undergraduate programs in the healthcare professions (3 years); Professional education, VARESE; Physiotherapy, VARESE; Dental Hygiene, VARESE; Nursing, VARESE, COMO; Midwifery, VARESE; Cardiocirculatory and Cardiovascular Perfusion techniques, VARESE; Biomedical Laboratory techniques, VARESE; Imaging and Radiotherapy techniques, VARESE; Master's Degree Courses (2 years); BioMedical Sciences, BUSTO ARSIZIO (Double Degree with The University of Applied Sciences, Bonn-Rhein-Sieg); Computer science, VARESE; Chemistry, COMO; Environmental Sciences, COMO; Environmental Sciences, COMO; Economics, Finance and Business Law, VARESE; Global entrepreneurship economics and management (GEEM), VARESE (made in English); Mathematics, COMO; Molecular and industrial biotechnology, VARESE (Double Degree with the University of Chemistry and Technology, Prague); Physics, COMO; Science and Technical Communication, VARESE; Degree courses in unique cycle (6 years); Law, VARESE, COMO; Medicine and Surgery, VARESE; School of Dentistry, VARESE

== Organisation ==
Since faculties in Italy have been abolished, departments (that usually managed research) have taken up faculties' didactic duties. The current departments (as of 2014) are the following:

- Dipartimento di biotecnologie e scienze della vita - DBSV
- Dipartimento di diritto, economia e culture - DiDEC
- Dipartimento di economia - DiECO
- Dipartimento di medicina clinica e sperimentale - DMCS
- Dipartimento di scienza e alta tecnologia - DISAT
- Dipartimento di scienze chirurgiche e morfologiche - DSCM
- Dipartimento di scienze teoriche e applicate - DISTA
- Dipartimento di scienze umane per l'innovazione del territorio - DISUIT

== See also ==
- List of Italian universities
