= Forza Europa =

Former conservative political group of the European Parliament

- European Parliament group
- Name: Forza Europa
- English abbr.: FE
- Formal name: Forza Europa
- Ideology: Conservatism; Liberal conservatism; Populism; Christian democracy; Euroscepticism
- Political position: Centre-right
- From: 19 July 1994
- To: 6 July 1995
- Succeeded by: Union for Europe
- Chaired by: Giancarlo Ligabue
- MEP(s): 27 (21 July 1994)

Forza Europa was a conservative political group that operated in the European Parliament between 1994 and 1995. Most of its MEPs were affiliated with the Forza Italia party of Silvio Berlusconi.

== History ==
27 MEPs from the Italian centre-right party Forza Italia, along with MEPs of the Christian Democratic Centre and the Union of the Centre, were elected in the 1994 European election and formed their own Group, self-referentially called "Forza Europa", on 19 July 1994. The group was unique at the time for being dominated one national-level political party, and being composed of MEPs from a single EU member nation. The group was generally sceptical of European integration.

The group was joined on 15 December 1994 by one MEP of the Italian Democratic Socialist Party, and one MEP of the Federalists and Liberal Democrats.

The Group lasted until it merged with the European Democratic Alliance to form the "Group Union for Europe" on 6 July 1995.

== Members ==
Country	Name		Ideology	MEPs
Italy	Forza Italia	FI	Liberal conservatism Populism	27 / 87
Italy	Italian Democratic Socialist Party	PSDI	Social democracy Euroscepticism	1 / 87
Italy	Federalists and Liberal Democrats	FLD	Liberalism; Christian democracy	1 / 87

== Sources ==
- Democracy in the European Parliament
- Europe Politique
- European Parliament MEP Archives
- Development of Political Groups in the European Parliament
- European Parliament 1996 press releases
- European Parliament election website 1999
