= Giancarlo Ligabue =

Italian paleontologist and politician

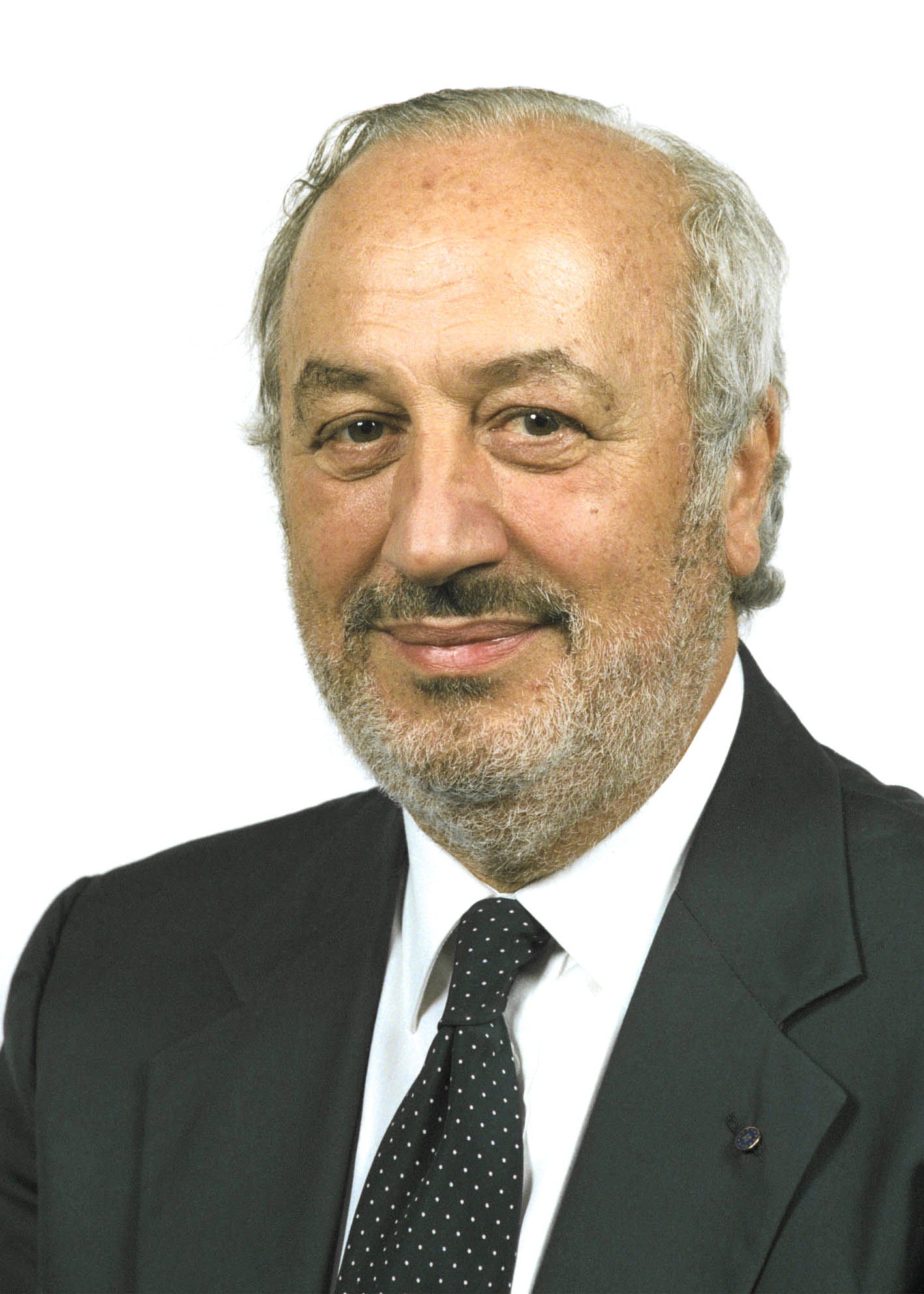
- Ligabue in 1994

Member of the European Parliament
- In office 19 July 1994 – 20 July 1999

Personal details
- Born: 30 October 1931 Venice, Italy
- Died: 25 January 2015 (aged 83) Venice, Italy
- Party: Forza Italia
- Education: Ca' Foscari University of Venice; University of Paris

Giancarlo Ligabue (30 October 1931 – 25 January 2015) was an Italian paleontologist, scholar, politician and businessman.

Born in Venice, Ligabue graduated in economics at the Ca' Foscari University of Venice and in Geology at la Sorbonne, and later received five honorary degrees from the universities of Bologna, Venice, Modena, Lima and Ashgabat. He participated or directed over 130 expeditions around the world, and made several paleontological discoveries, such as the Ligabueino, a noasaurid dinosaur named after him, and such as the unearthed deposits of hominid and dinosaurs fossils in the Ténéré desert. He collaborated with Piero Angela to several science documentaries. He was president of the Natural History Museum of Venice and founder of the Ligabue Study and Research Centre in Venice.

He started the semiannual thematic Ligabue Magazine on archaeological, paleontological and naturalistic topics.

Ligabue was also a businessman in the field of supplies and services for ships. He was the president of the basketball team Reyer Venezia Mestre between the early sixties and early eighties. He was a member of the European Parliament for Forza Italia within the Forza Europa group between 1994 and 1999.
