= 1994 European Parliament election in Italy =

- 12 June 1994
- All 87 Italian seats to the European Parliament
- Turnout: 73.6% (▼7.5 pp)
Party	Leader	Vote %	Seats	+/–
FI	Silvio Berlusconi	30.6%	27	New
PDS	Achille Occhetto	19.1%	16	−6
AN	Gianfranco Fini	12.5%	11	+7
PPI	Rosa Russo Iervolino	10.0%	8	−18
LN	Umberto Bossi	6.6%	6	+4
PRC	Fausto Bertinotti	6.1%	5	New
Segni Pact	Mario Segni	3.3%	3	New
Greens	Carlo Ripa di Meana	3.3%	3	−2
Pannella List	Marco Pannella	2.1%	2	+1
PSI – AD	O. Del Turco & W. Bordon	1.8%	2	−10
Network	Leoluca Orlando	1.1%	1	New
PRI	Giorgio La Malfa	0.7%	1	−2
PSDI	Enrico Ferri	0.7%	1	−1
SVP	Siegfried Brugger	0.6%	1	0
This lists parties that won seats. See the complete results below.
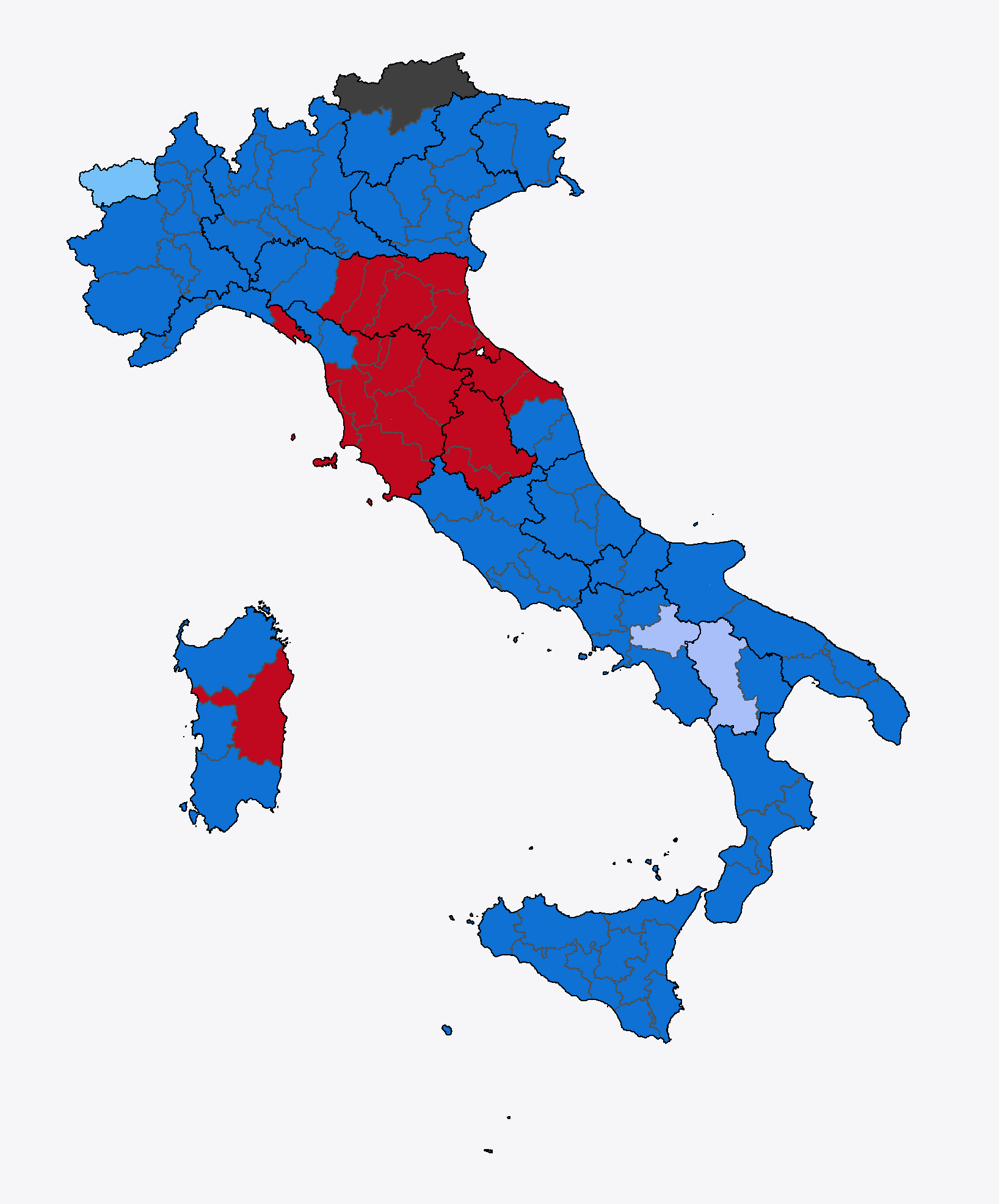
Major party in each province

The 1994 European Parliament election in Italy was the election of the delegation from Italy to the European Parliament in 1994. It was the first continental election after the Tangentopoli scandal, which destroyed the traditional republican parties of the First Italian Republic; consequently, all new parties contested the race.

== Electoral system ==
The pure party-list proportional representation was the traditional electoral system of the Italian Republic since its foundation in 1946, so it had been adopted to elect the Italian representatives to the European Parliament too. Two levels were used: a national level to divide seats between parties, and a constituency level to distribute them between candidates. Italian regions were united in 5 constituencies, each electing a group of deputies. At national level, seats were divided between party lists using the largest remainder method with Hare quota. All seats gained by each party were automatically distributed to their local open lists and their most voted candidates.

=== Constituencies ===
Seats are allocated to party lists on a national basis using an electoral quota, with the residue given to the lists with the largest excess over whole quotas. An electoral quota is then calculated for each list and used to allocate seats to each list in each of the five electoral regions.

Electoral Region	Administrative Regions	Seats
North-West	Aosta Valley, Liguria, Lombardy, Piedmont	25
North-East	Emilia-Romagna, Friuli-Venezia Giulia, Trentino-Alto Adige/Südtirol, Veneto	18
Central	Latium, Marche, Tuscany, Umbria	20
Southern	Abruzzo, Apulia, Basilicata, Calabria, Campania, Molise	16
Islands	Sardinia, Sicily	8

== Main parties and leaders ==
=== Outgoing MEPs ===
EP Group	Seats	Party	MEPs
Socialist Group	34 / 81		
Socialist Group	34 / 81	Democratic Party of the Left	20
Socialist Group	34 / 81	Italian Socialist Party	12
Socialist Group	34 / 81	Italian Democratic Socialist Party	2
European People's Party Group	27 / 81		
European People's Party Group	27 / 81	Christian Democracy (PPI)	26
European People's Party Group	27 / 81	South Tyrolean People's Party	1
Green Group	6 / 81		
Green Group	6 / 81	Federation of the Greens	5
Green Group	6 / 81	Proletarian Democracy (PRC)	1
European Liberal Democrat and Reform Party Group	4 / 81		
European Liberal Democrat and Reform Party Group	4 / 81	Italian Republican Party	3
European Liberal Democrat and Reform Party Group	4 / 81	Antiprohibitionists on Drugs (Pannella List)	1
Rainbow Group	1 / 81		
Rainbow Group	1 / 81	Sardinian Action Party	1
Non-Inscrits	9 / 81		
Non-Inscrits	9 / 81	Italian Social Movement (AN)	4
Non-Inscrits	9 / 81	Communist Refoundation Party	2
Non-Inscrits	9 / 81	Lombard League (LN)	2
Non-Inscrits	9 / 81	Federalists (Pannella List)	1

=== Summary of parties ===
Party	Main ideology	Leader	European party	Outgoing MEPs
Italian People's Party (PPI)	Christian democracy	Rosa Russo Iervolino	EPP	26 / 81
Democratic Party of the Left (PDS)	Democratic socialism	Achille Occhetto	PES	20 / 81
Italian Socialist Party – Democratic Alliance (PSI– AD)	Social democracy	Ottaviano Del Turco; Willer Bordon	PES	12 / 81
Federation of the Greens (FdV)	Green politics	Carlo Ripa di Meana	EFGP	5 / 81
National Alliance (AN)	National conservatism	Gianfranco Fini	None	4 / 81
Communist Refoundation Party (PRC)	Communism	Fausto Bertinotti	None	3 / 81
Italian Republican Party (PRI)	Liberalism	Giorgio La Malfa	ELDR	3 / 81
Italian Democratic Socialist Party (PSDI)	Social democracy	Enrico Ferri	PES	2 / 81
Pannella List	Libertarianism	Marco Pannella	None	2 / 81
Northern League (LN)	Regionalism	Umberto Bossi	EFA	1 / 81
South Tyrolean People's Party (SVP)	Regionalism	Siegfried Brugger	EPP	1 / 81
Forza Italia (FI)	Liberal conservatism	Silvio Berlusconi	None	0 / 81
Segni Pact	Christian democracy	Mario Segni	None	0 / 81
The Network	Anti-corruption	Leoluca Orlando	None	0 / 81

== Results ==
The new party Forza Italia (FI), led by the Italian Prime Minister Silvio Berlusconi, won the election with 30.6% of the vote and 27 seats. The second party was the Democratic Party of the Left (PDS), main heir of the Italian Communist Party (PCI), which gained 19.1% of the vote and 16 seats, while the third party was National Alliance (AN), heir of the Italian Social Movement (MSI), which gained 12.5% of the vote and 11 seats. The Italian People's Party (PPI), main heir of Christian Democracy (DC), gained 10.0% of the vote and 8 seats.

← Summary of the 12 June 1994 European Parliament election results in Italy →
National party	Votes	%	+/–	Seats	+/–
Forza Italia (FI)	10,089,139	30.62	New	27	New
Democratic Party of the Left (PDS)	6,281,354	19.06	8.52 ▼	16	6 ▼
National Alliance (AN)	4,108,670	12.47	6.96 ▲	11	7 ▲
Italian People's Party (PPI)	3,295,337	10.00	22.90 ▼	8	18 ▼
Northern League (LN)	2,162,586	6.56	4.73 ▲	6	4 ▲
Communist Refoundation Party (PRC)	2,004,716	6.08	New	5	New
Segni Pact (PS)	1,073,095	3.26	New	3	New
Federation of the Greens (FdV)	1,055,797	3.20	2.97 ▼	3	2 ▼
Pannella List (LP)	702,717	2.13	0.89 ▲	2	1 ▲
Italian Socialist Party – Democratic Alliance (PSI–AD)	606,538	1.84	12.96 ▼	2	10 ▼
The Network (LR)	366,258	1.11	New	1	New
Italian Republican Party (PRI)	242,786	0.74	–	1	2 ▼
Italian Democratic Socialist Party (PSDI)	227,439	0.69	2.03 ▼	1	1 ▼
Southern Action League (LAM)	224,033	0.67	New	0	New
South Tyrolean People's Party (SVP)	202,668	0.62	0.12 ▲	1	0
Federalism (UV–SN–LAV–PN)	126,937	0.39	0.21 ▼	0	1 ▼
Lombard Alpine League (LAL)	110,458	0.34	New	0	New
Federation of Liberals (FdL)	53,983	0.16	New	0	New
Solidarity	15,214	0.05	New	0	New
Valid votes	32,949,725				
Blank and invalid votes	2,753,484				
Totals	35,667,440	100.00	—	87	6 ▲
Electorate (eligible voters) and voter turnout		48,461,792	73.60	7.47 ▼	
Source: Ministry of the Interior

Popular vote
FI	30.6%
PDS	19.1%
AN	12.5%
PPI	10.0%
LN	6.6%
PRC	6.1%
Segni	3.3%
FdV	3.2%
Pannella	2.1%
PSI–AD	1.8%
Rete	1.1%
Others	3.3%

=== Distribution by European group ===
European Parliament group	Seats	National party	Seats
Forza Europa	27 / 87	Forza Italia (FI)	27
Group of the Party of European Socialists	18 / 87	Democratic Party of the Left (PDS)	16
Group of the Party of European Socialists	18 / 87	Italian Socialist Party (PSI)	2
European People's Party Group	12 / 87	Italian People's Party (PPI)	8
European People's Party Group	12 / 87	Segni Pact (PS)	3
European People's Party Group	12 / 87	South Tyrolean People's Party (SVP)	1
European Liberal Democrat and Reform Party Group	7 / 87	Northern League (LN)	6
European Liberal Democrat and Reform Party Group	7 / 87	Italian Republican Party (PRI)	1
European United Left	5 / 87	Communist Refoundation Party (PRC)	5
The Green Group in the European Parliament	4 / 87	Federation of the Greens (FdV)	3
The Green Group in the European Parliament	4 / 87	The Network (LR)	1
European Radical Alliance	2 / 87	Pannella List (LP)	2
Non-Inscrits	12 / 87	National Alliance (AN)	11
Non-Inscrits	12 / 87	Italian Democratic Socialist Party (PSDI)	1

== See also ==
- 1994 Italian general election
