= Vickers R.E.P. Type Monoplane =

Monoplane
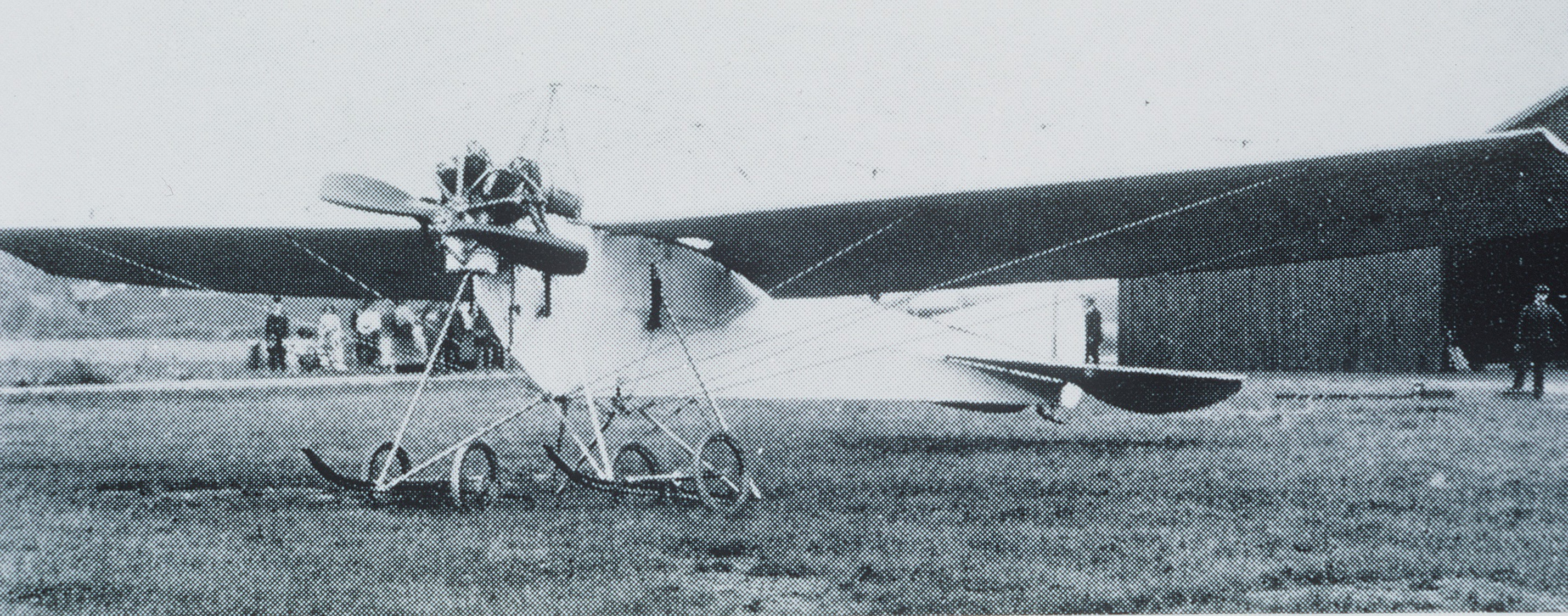

General information
- Type: Training aircraft
- National origin: United Kingdom
- Manufacturer: Vickers, Sons & Maxim
- Primary user: Vickers Flying School
- Number built: 8

History
- First flight: July 1911

The Vickers R.E.P. Type Monoplanes were a series of single-engined monoplane aircraft built by Vickers prior to the outbreak of the First World War. They were developed from a French design for which Vickers had purchased a license, with eight being built.

== Design and development ==
On 1 January 1911 Vickers, Sons and Maxim (which would be renamed Vickers Limited later that year), entered into a license agreement to build aircraft and aero-engines designed by the Frenchman Robert Esnault-Pelterie (hence R.E.P.), and sell them in Britain and its Empire. Following the agreement, Vickers purchased a French-built R.E.P. monoplane for use as a demonstrator together with an R.E.P.-built rear fuselage.

The design was redrawn from metric to imperial measurements by Vickers, while the first example was built at the Vickers factory at Erith, Kent (now part of Greater London), using the French-built rear fuselage and a French-built engine, but was otherwise the rest of the components were Vickers-built. It made its maiden flight from Vickers' new airfield at Joyce Green, near Dartford in July 1911, piloted by Captain Herbert F. Wood, the manager of Vickers' aviation department.

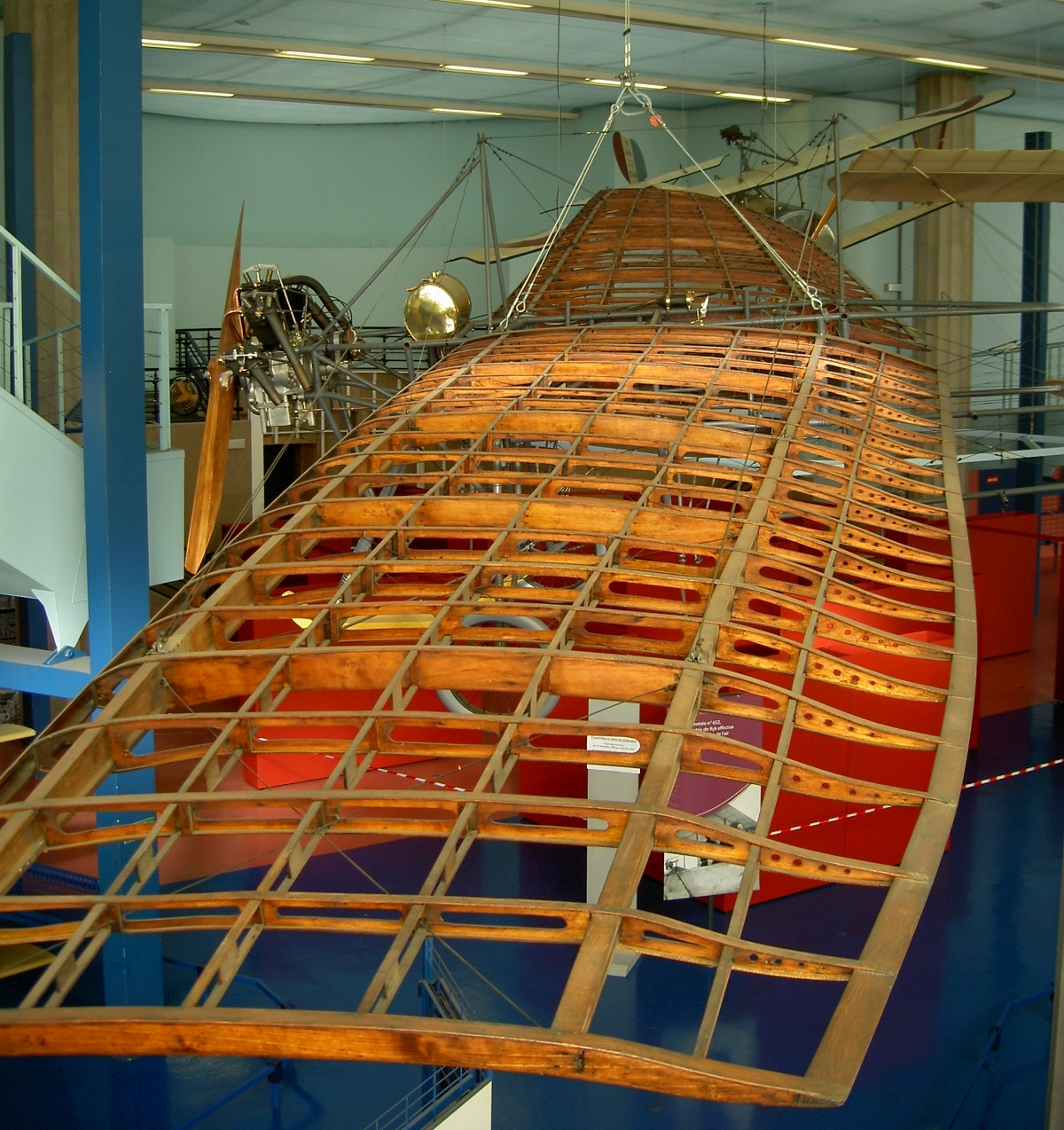
Wing structure of the R.E.P Type D Monoplane by Robert Esnault-Pelterie which was the basis for the Vickers R.E.P. Type Monoplane

The aircraft was a shoulder-winged monoplane, with a deep but narrow fuselage of fabric-covered steel-tube construction, accommodating two people in tandem. A single five-cylinder air-cooled R.E.P. "fan" (or "semi-radial") engine rated at 60 horsepower (45 kW) driving a two-bladed propeller was fitted in the aircraft's nose, while the aircraft had a conventional landing gear, with both wheels and skids. The wings were of wood and steel construction, with lateral control by wing-warping, with the pilot operating a joystick.

The first five monoplanes were basically similar, and were powered by R.E.P engines, with the fifth one having a deeper fuselage. The sixth aircraft, built for the 1912 British Military Aeroplane Competition was noticeably different, with side-by-side seating for its two crew, a shorter wingspan (35 ft [10.67 m] rather than 47 ft 6 in [14.48 m] for the earlier aircraft), while a 70 hp (52 kW) Viale radial engine was fitted.

The seventh aircraft reverted to the tandem layout and longer wingspan of the first five aircraft, but replaced the R.E.P. engine with a 100 hp (75 kW) Gnome rotary engine, while the eighth, and final example, was similar to the sixth aircraft, with a 70–80 hp Gnome rotary.

== Operational history ==
=== Great Britain ===
The major role for the other aircraft was as trainers at the Vickers Flying School established at Brooklands, Surrey in 1912. In this role they proved underpowered, and were difficult to fly as they lacked inherent stability.

=== Antarctica ===
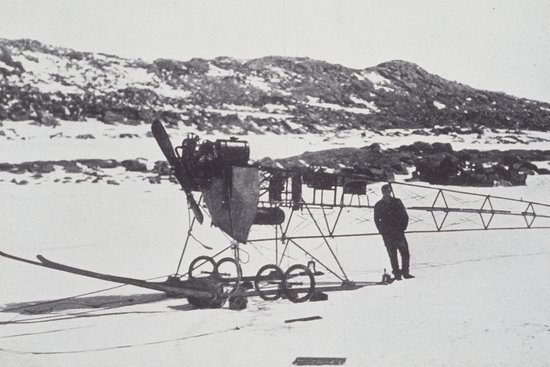
The Vickers R.E.P. in Antarctica as an air tractor

The second monoplane was sold to the Australian explorer Douglas Mawson for the Australasian Antarctic Expedition of 1911. It was badly damaged in a crash landing at Adelaide in October 1911, however, so it was taken to Antarctica without its wings to use as a tractor for sledges. It proved unsuccessful in this role as the low temperatures caused lubricating oil to solidify and the engine to seize. The airframe was abandoned at the Cape Denison base of the expedition, with parts of the aircraft being discovered in 2010.

== Specifications (Nos. 1 to 3) ==
Data from Vickers Aircraft since 1908

General characteristics

- Crew: two
- Length: 36 ft 5 in (11.10 m)
- Wingspan: 47 ft 6 in (14.48 m)
- Wing area: 290 sq ft (27 m^{2})
- Empty weight: 1,000 lb (454 kg)
- Powerplant: 1 × R.E.P five-cylinder air-cooled fan-type engine, 60 hp (45 kW)

Performance

- Maximum speed: 56 mph (90 km/h, 49 kn)
