= Valev =

Valev (Bulgarian: Вълев) is a Bulgarian masculine surname, its feminine counterpart is Valeva. It may refer to

- Anna Valev (born 1969), Swedish ballet dancer
- Marko Valev (born 1969), Bulgarian judoka
- Nikolay Valev (born 1980), Bulgarian football forward
- Stefan Valev (1935–2009), Bulgarian graphic and industrial designer

== See also ==
- Vale (surname)
- Valek (surname)
- Vales (surname)
