= Viale =

Viale may refer to:

- Viale (surname), an Italian surname

== Places ==
- Viale, Entre Ríos, Argentina
- Viale, Piedmont, Asti, Italy
- Viale is Italian for boulevard. Some notable roads whose names use that word include:
  - Viale Aventino, Rome, Italy
  - Viale Enrico Forlanini, Milan, Italy
  - Viale Lazio, Palermo, Italy, location of the Viale Lazio massacre
  - Viale Luigi Borri, Varese, Italy
  - Viale Luigi Majno, Milan, Italy
  - Viale Pasubio, Milan, Italy

== Other ==
- Viale 35 hp, five-cylinder, air-cooled, radial engine for aircraft use
