= Viale (surname) =

Viale is a surname. Notable people with the surname include:

- Fabio Viale (born 1975), Italian sculptor
- Giovanna Viale (born 1949), Italian geneticist
- Jean-Louis Viale (1933–1984), French jazz drummer
- Juan Manuel Viale (born 1981), Argentinian football player
- Julien Viale (born 1982), French football player
- Luigi Viale (born 1978), Italian yacht racer
- Michele Viale-Prelà (1798–1860), French priest and diplomat
- Raimondo Viale (1907–1984), Italian priest
- Robert M. Viale (1916–1945), American army officer
- Spirito Mario Viale (born 1882), Italian engineer

== See also ==
- Viale (disambiguation)
- Vale (surname)
- Viali
