= Aerospace Bristol =

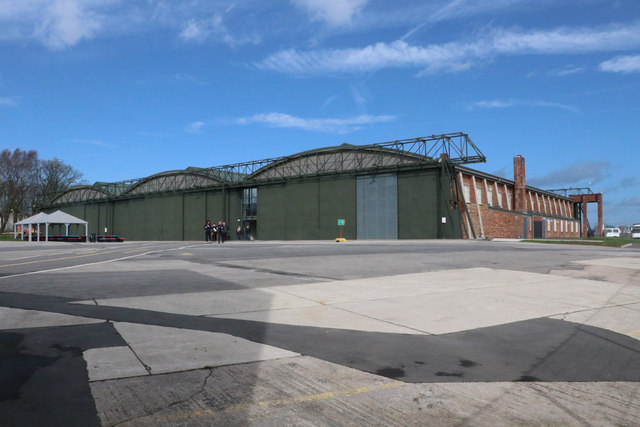

- Location within Gloucestershire
- Established: 17 October 2017
- Location: Filton, England
- Coordinates: 51.523°N 2.579°W
- Type: Aerospace museum
- Website: aerospacebristol.org

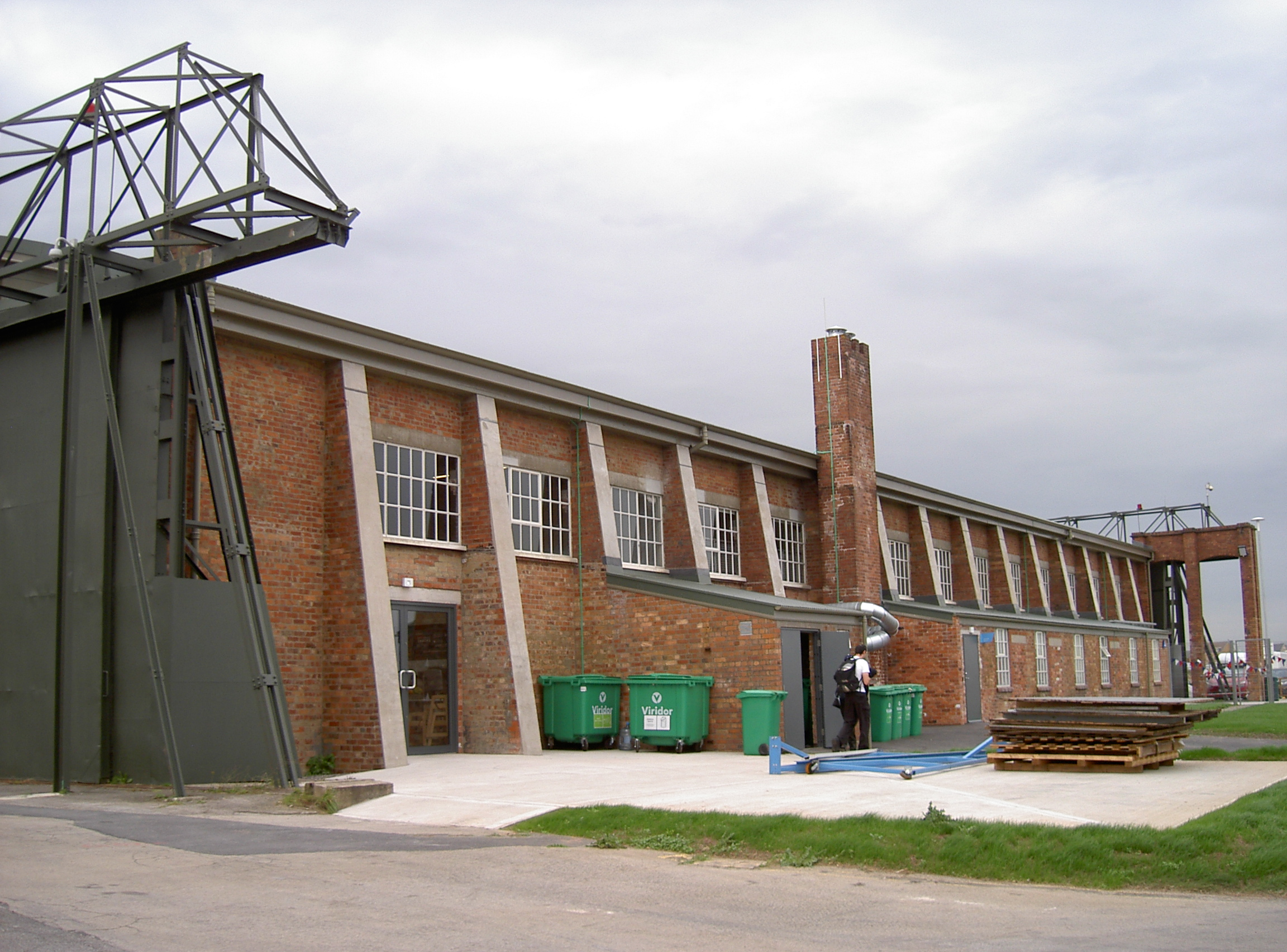
Side view of the renovated "Belfast" hangar (October 2017)

Aerospace Bristol is an aerospace museum at Filton, to the north of Bristol, England. The project is run by the Bristol Aero Collection Trust and houses a varied collection of exhibits, including Concorde Alpha Foxtrot, the final Concorde to be built and the last to fly.

== The museum ==
The museum is situated on Filton Airfield and the main exhibition is housed in a First World War Grade II listed hangar, A second hangar from the same era, also Grade II listed, is used as the workshop and storage area for items undergoing restoration, with Concorde exhibited in a new, purpose-built hangar. The exhibits cover over 100 years of aviation history through two world wars, exploring the role of aircraft in these conflicts, through the drama and technological advances of the space race and on to the modern day.

== The Concorde Trust, 2007 to 2012 ==
The Concorde Trust was formed in 2007 and produced applications for support for a new museum that would house one Concorde aircraft.

== History ==
=== 2003 ===
Concorde Alpha Foxtrot (G-BOAF) flew into Filton in November. She remained out in the open for 14 years until the construction of a dedicated exhibition building was completed.

=== 2012 to 2014 ===
In December 2012 the Bristol Post reported that BAE Systems, who were selling Filton Airfield for development, would be contributing the site – including the listed hangars – and £2.4 million in funding, for a new museum for which other corporate sponsors and a Heritage Lottery Fund grant would be sought.

In 2014, the trust was awarded a grant of £4.7 million by the Heritage Lottery Fund. Plans were begun for construction of a visitor centre, later named Aerospace Bristol and due to open in Summer 2017.

=== 2016 ===
On 26 May, Aerospace Bristol held a ground-breaking ceremony to mark the start of construction of the new Concorde hangar. On 15 September, Princess Anne became the patron of Aerospace Bristol for the next two years. On 13 October, she visited the site to attend a 'topping out' ceremony celebrating a major milestone in the construction.

=== 2017 ===
On 7 February, Concorde Alpha Foxtrot was moved into the purpose-built hangar at Aerospace Bristol. On 8 March, a Sea Harrier was delivered to the museum site, airlifted by an RAF Chinook, for display in the exhibition. On 16 August, the Red Arrows performed a flypast in Concorde formation whilst members of the public formed the shape of Concorde on the ground. On 17 October, Aerospace Bristol opened its doors to the public.

=== 2023 ===
South Gloucestershire Council wrote off up to £315,900 of a ten-year £470,000 loan to the Bristol Aerospace Collection Trust, and made a £154,000 grant over four years to help restore the number of school visits, in what was termed a "rescue package" following the COVID-19 pandemic.

== Exhibition ==
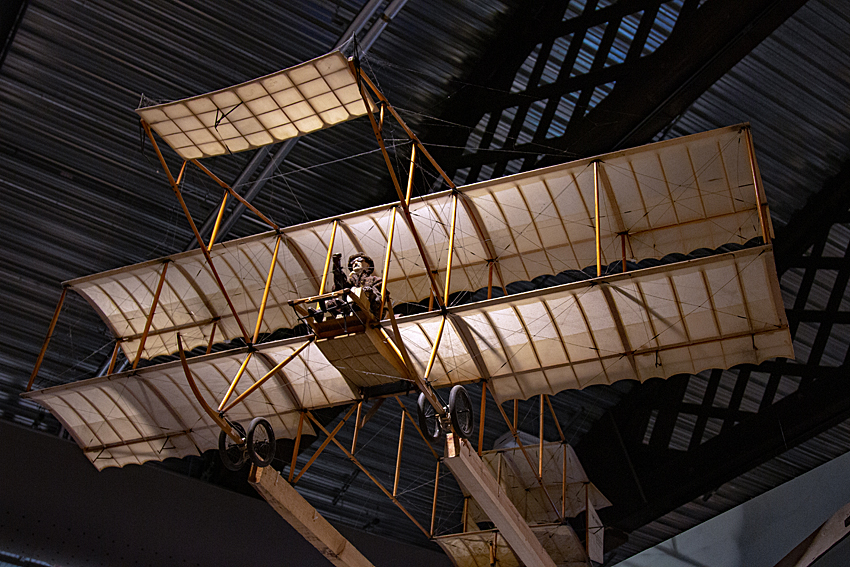
Bristol Boxkite replica

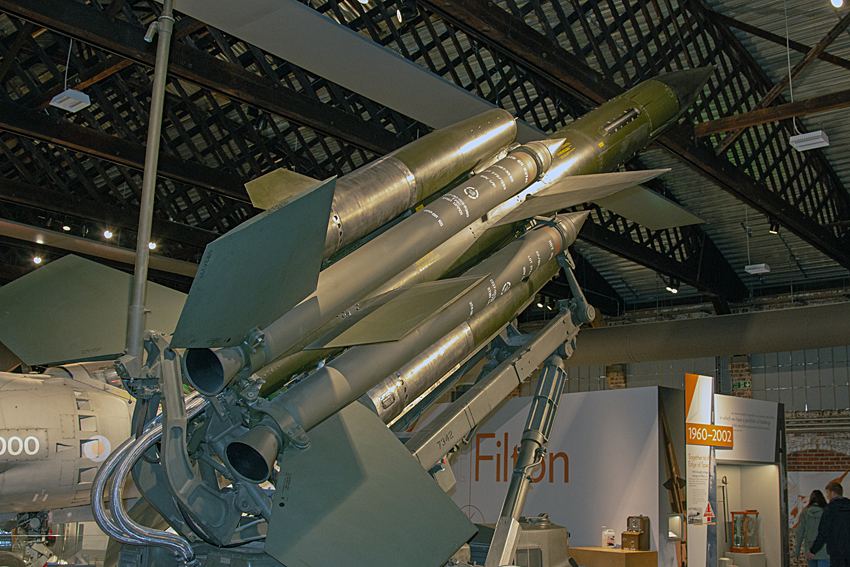
Bristol Bloodhound surface-to-air missile

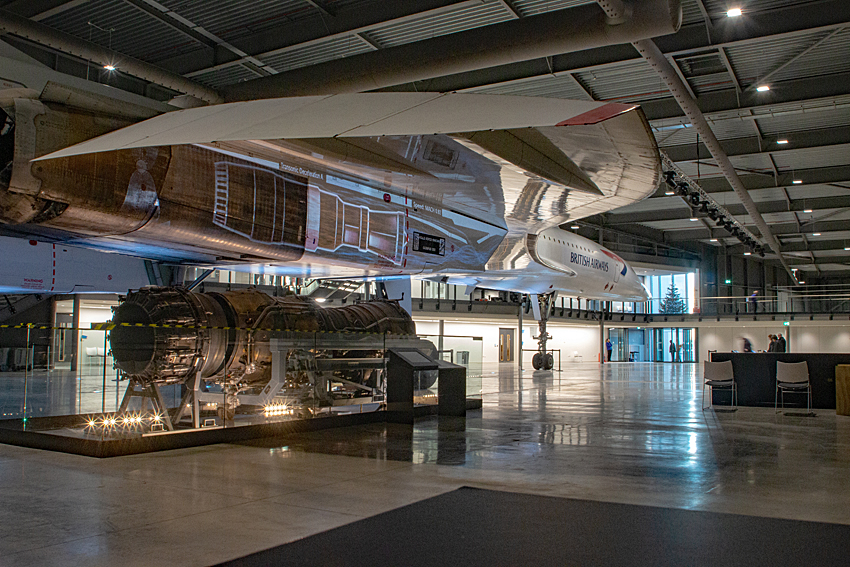
Concorde G-BOAF Alpha Foxtrot displayed with a Rolls-Royce/Snecma Olympus 593 jet engine

The collection contains over 8,000 artefacts. There are several Bristol-built aircraft, some original, some modern replicas, including Concorde Alpha Foxtrot, a Bristol Scout, a Bristol Fighter and a Bristol Bolingbroke, the Canadian built version of the Bristol Blenheim bomber, which is under restoration. There are examples of Bristol motor vehicles as well as many scale models. Also on display are a number of Bristol aircraft engines, from both the piston and jet eras.

The exhibition is themed around seven eras of aviation, with a separate hangar that celebrates the story of Concorde and its local connection:

- Era One: Pioneers 1903–1910 First Flights Featuring interactive exhibits and touch screen archive browsers. A major exhibit here is a flyable replica of a Bristol Boxkite, built for the film, Those Magnificent Men in Their Flying Machines.
- Era Two: First World War & Beyond c.1914–1920 Shows the impact of World War I on Filton and features a Fighter and a Scout bi-plane.
- Era Three: The Growth of Flight 1920s–1930s Represents a time of major innovation in aircraft design, including a replica Bristol Babe.
- Era Four: World War II c.1935–1945 Depicts the impact of World War II on Filton and aviation.
- Era Five: Bigger, Faster, Further 1945–1960 The huge Brabazon airliner is represented here by its wheels and nameplate, alongside the Britannia fuselage. The two objects represent the growing importance of passenger aircraft to the aviation industry.
- Era Six: Ocean Floor to Outer Space 1960–1981 Represents Bristol stepping into the space age. Three objects mark the transition into this era: a satellite, a missile and a model of a supersonic aircraft.
- Era Seven: Working across the world 1982-today Featuring a section of an A320 wing, the exhibit gives visitors an insight into the workings of today's aviation industry.
- The Concorde Hangar Featuring Concorde Alpha Foxtrot. Designed jointly in Bristol and Toulouse, and built in Bristol, she was the last Concorde to be built and the last to fly. Displayed alongside the aircraft is a Rolls-Royce/Snecma Olympus 593 jet engine.
- The Conservation in Action Workshop Located in another First World War hangar, can be visited to watch restoration work being carried out on future exhibits.

== See also ==
- List of aerospace museums
