= Esnault-Pelterie REP.2 =

French experimental aircraft of 1908

REP.2
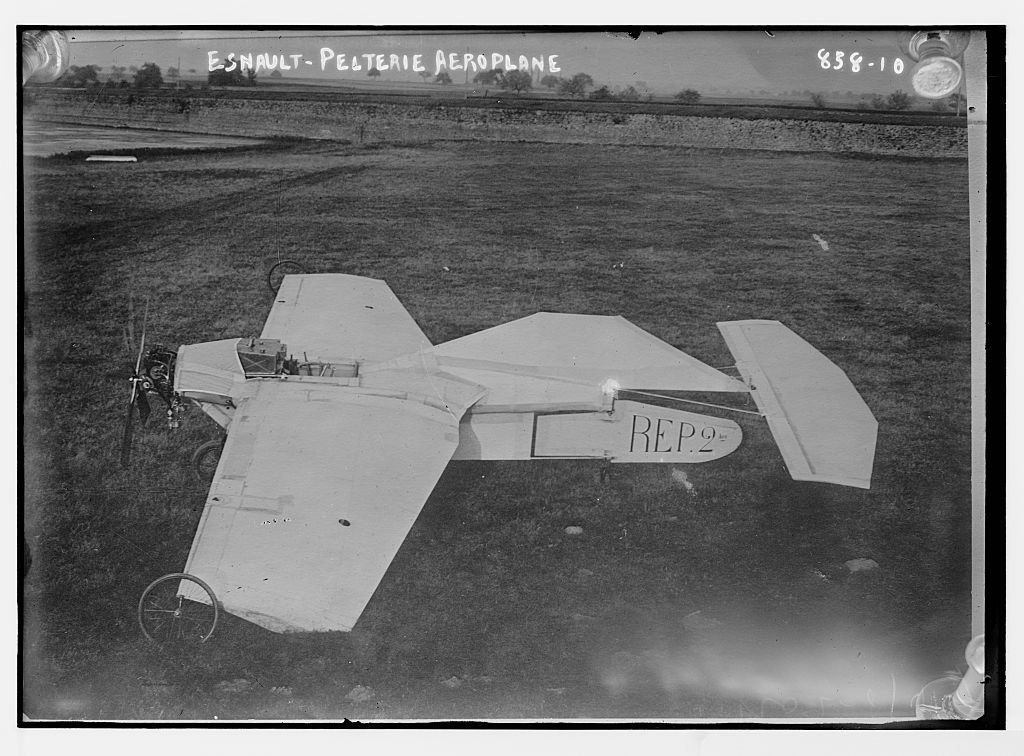
- The R.E.P. 2 in 1908

General information
- Type: Experimental aircraft
- National origin: France
- Manufacturer: Robert Esnault-Pelterie
- Designer: Robert Esnault-Pelterie
- Number built: 1

History
- First flight: June 1908
- Developed from: Esnault-Pelterie REP.1

The Esnault-Pelterie REP.2 was an early experimental aircraft designed and built by Robert Esnault-Pelterie in France in 1908. In its final form, the REP.2bis, it was the most successful of Esnault-Pelterie's early designs.

== Design ==
Like Esnault-Pelterie's previous REP.1, it was a high-wing monoplane with a short fuselage and an open cockpit for the pilot. Power was provided by a piston engine in the nose of Esnault-Pelterie's own design. This engine turned a tractor-mounted propeller. The undercarriage was unusual, consisting of a main monowheel and a tailwheel. This bicycle arrangement was supplemented by large outrigger wheels mounted on the wingtips. The trapezoidal wings had a marked anhedral, and lateral control was achieved by wing-warping. It was originally fitted with small elevators on the forward fuselage, but these were soon removed.

The REP.2 differed from the REP.1 in having a large ventral balanced rudder.

== Development ==
Tests with the REP.2 commenced in June 1908, and on 8 June a flight of 1,200 m (3,900 ft) was made, reaching an altitude of 30 m (100 ft), setting a height and distance record for monoplanes. As originally constructed, Esnault-Pelterie made several brief flights in it, but none longer than one or two minutes.

The aircraft was then modified by the addition of a trapezoidal dorsal fin, to create the REP.2bis. In this form, piloted by M. Châteaux, it won the third Ae.C.F. prize for a flight of over 200 metres on 21 November 1908, with an officially observed flight of 316 m (1,037 ft). It was then exhibited at the Paris Aero Salon in December 1908 and at the Aero Show at Olympia in London in 1909. While on show, Esnault-Pelterie offered the aircraft for sale for £GBP 1,400 (about £GBP 142,000 in 2025), which aviation historian Kenneth Munson described as "optimistic".

In May 1909, it made its longest flight, of 8 kilometres (5.0 mi), covering the distance in about seven minutes.

It was entered for the Grande Semaine d'Aviation ("Grand week of Aviation") in Reims in August 1909, but Esnault-Pelterie did not compete there owing to an injury to his hand. Nevertheless, of four Esnault-Pelterie monoplanes fielded, it was the only one to make a flight (and even then, only once.) It carried the tail number 3.

As the REP.2bis, it made twelve flights.

== Variants ==
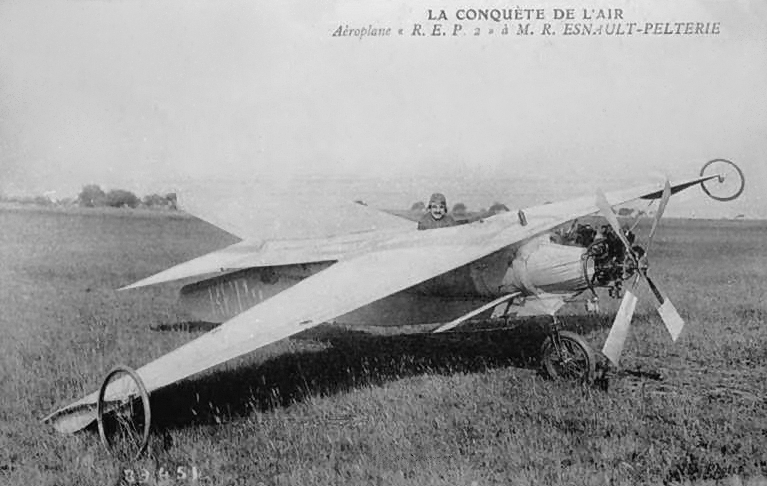
The R.E.P. 2 in 1909

- REP.2: initial version of 1908
- REP.2bis: improved version of 1909

== Specifications (REP.2bis) ==
Data from The Illustrated Encyclopedia of Aircraft 1983, p.1616

General characteristics

- Crew: 1
- Length: 6.85 m (22 ft 6 in)
- Wingspan: 8.60 m (28 ft 3 in)
- Height: 2.50 m (8 ft 2 in)
- Wing area: 15.75 m^{2} (169.5 sq ft)
- Max takeoff weight: 350 kg (772 lb)
- Powerplant: 1 × REP air-cooled, seven-cylinder semi-radial ("fan") engine, 22 kW (30 hp)

Performance

- Maximum speed: 80 km/h (50 mph, 43 kn)

== Notes ==
=== Bibliography ===
- Dumas, Alexandre (1909). Stud Book de l'Aviation [Stud Book of Aviation] (in French). Paris: Edition du journal l'Aero.
- "Experiences de M. R. Esnault-Pelterie". L'Aérophile (in French). 15 June 1908.
- Gibbs-Smith, Charles H. (1966). A Directory and Nomenclature of the First Aeroplanes 1809 to 1909. London: Her Majesty's Stationery Office.
- The Illustrated Encyclopedia of Aircraft. London: Aerospace Publishing.
- "Le Monoplan R.E.P bis gagne le 3e Prix de 200 metres". L'Aérophile (in French): 479. 1 December 1908.
- Munson, Kenneth (1969). Pioneer Aircraft 1903–14. London: Blandford.
- "Rheims Aero Meeting", Flight: 504, 21 August 1909
