= Vale (surname) =

Vale is an English, Spanish, and Portuguese surname. Notable people with the surname include:

- Angélica Vale (born 1975), Mexican actress, singer and comedian
- Brenda and Robert Vale, architects and researchers in the field of sustainable housing
- Bruno Vale (born 1983), Portuguese footballer
- Danna Sue Vale (born 1944), Australian politician
- Eric Vale (born 1974), American voice actor
- Harvey Vale (born 2003), English footballer
- Henry Hill Vale (1831–1875), British architect
- Jack Vale (Australian footballer) (1905–1970), Australian rules footballer
- Jack Vale (comedian) (born 1973), American comedian
- Jason Vale (born 1969), English author, motivational speaker and lifestyle coach
- Jerry Vale (1930–2014), American singer
- John Vale (1835–1909), American Civil War Medal of Honor recipient
- Lucas do Vale (born 1989), Brazilian politician
- Wylie Vale (1941–2012), American neurochemist

== See also ==
- Vale (disambiguation)
- Vicki Vale, comic book character
- Valek (surname)
- Vales (surname)
- Valev (surname)
- Viale (surname)
