= REP Parasol =

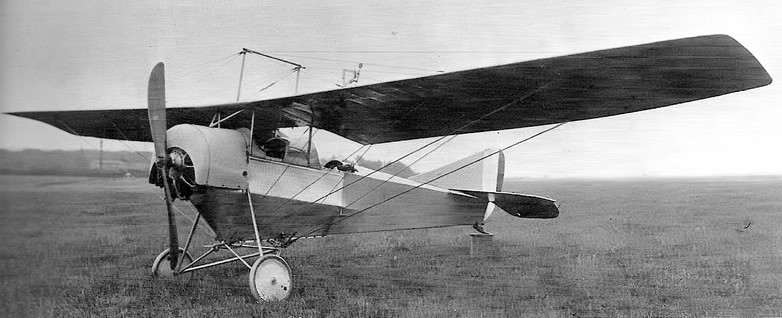

General information
- Type: Reconnaissance aircraft
- National origin: France
- Manufacturer: R.E.P.
- Designer: Robert Esnault-Pelterie
- Primary user: RNAS

History
- First flight: 1914

The R.E.P. 'Parasol' Type L was a military reconnaissance aircraft designed and produced in France by Robert Esnault-Pelterie (hence R.E.P.) in 1914.

== Design and development ==
It was a wire-braced, parasol-wing monoplane with a fixed, tailskid undercarriage. In France it was usually described as "Monoplan R.E.P. à ailes surélevées" (literally monoplane R.E.P. with elevated wings), and also as the "R.E.P. Vision Totale" (R.E.P. Total Vision).

The fuselage was constructed of steel tube and was of triangular cross-section, with the apex on the ventral side. The pilot and observer sat in tandem, open cockpits. Lateral control was by wing warping, using a complex fan of cables above and below the wings. The upper cables were carried over a pylon of tandem struts, strut braced across the top. Two versions were produced: a single-seater with a 45-kW (60-hp) le Rhône engine, and a two-seater with a 60-kW (80-hp) Gnome engine. It was armed with one machine-gun.

== Operational history ==
While France's Aéronautique Militaire did not purchase the design, and continued to use the Type N, Britain's Royal Naval Air Service purchased twelve examples. (serial no's 8454–8465). The first of these were delivered in August 1915 and were used during the early stages of the First World War.

The RNAS operated from Dunkirk and its main task was the bombing of German airfields to prevent attacks by aircraft on the British fleet. On, October 3, 1915, one of these aircraft, serial 8460 and flown by Flight Lieutenant Erroll Boyd from No.1 Wing, was on a bombing mission along the coast of Belgium, when it was hit by anti-aircraft fire. It made a forced landing in the Netherlands in and was interned there. The aircraft was subsequently purchased from the United Kingdom, repaired and entered Dutch military service on November 3, 1915 as LA23 (in 1918 this aircraft was reregistered as REP-3). It was later used for taxiing training.

== Operators ==
United Kingdom

- Royal Naval Air Service
  - No.1 Wing
  - No.4 Wing

Netherlands

- Luchtvaartafdeeling

== Specifications (R.E.P. Parasol two seater) ==
Data from Davilla & Soltan 2002, p.430,

General characteristics

- Crew: Two (pilot and observer)
- Length: 7.67 m (25 ft 2 in)
- Wingspan: 11.25 m (36 ft 11 in)
- Wing area: 22 m^{2} (237 sq ft)
- Empty weight: 295 kg (649 lb)
- Powerplant: 1 × Gnome rotary , 60 kW (80 hp)

Performance

- Maximum speed: 125 km/h (78 mph, 68 kn)
- Rate of climb: 1.8 m/s (350 ft/min)

Armament

- Guns: 1 machine-gun
- Bombs: 6 x 65 lb bombs under the wings, plus 12 x 5-6 lb hand bombs

== See also ==
Aircraft of comparable role, configuration, and era Morane-Saulnier L
