= REP Type K =

French sport and military aircraft

Type K
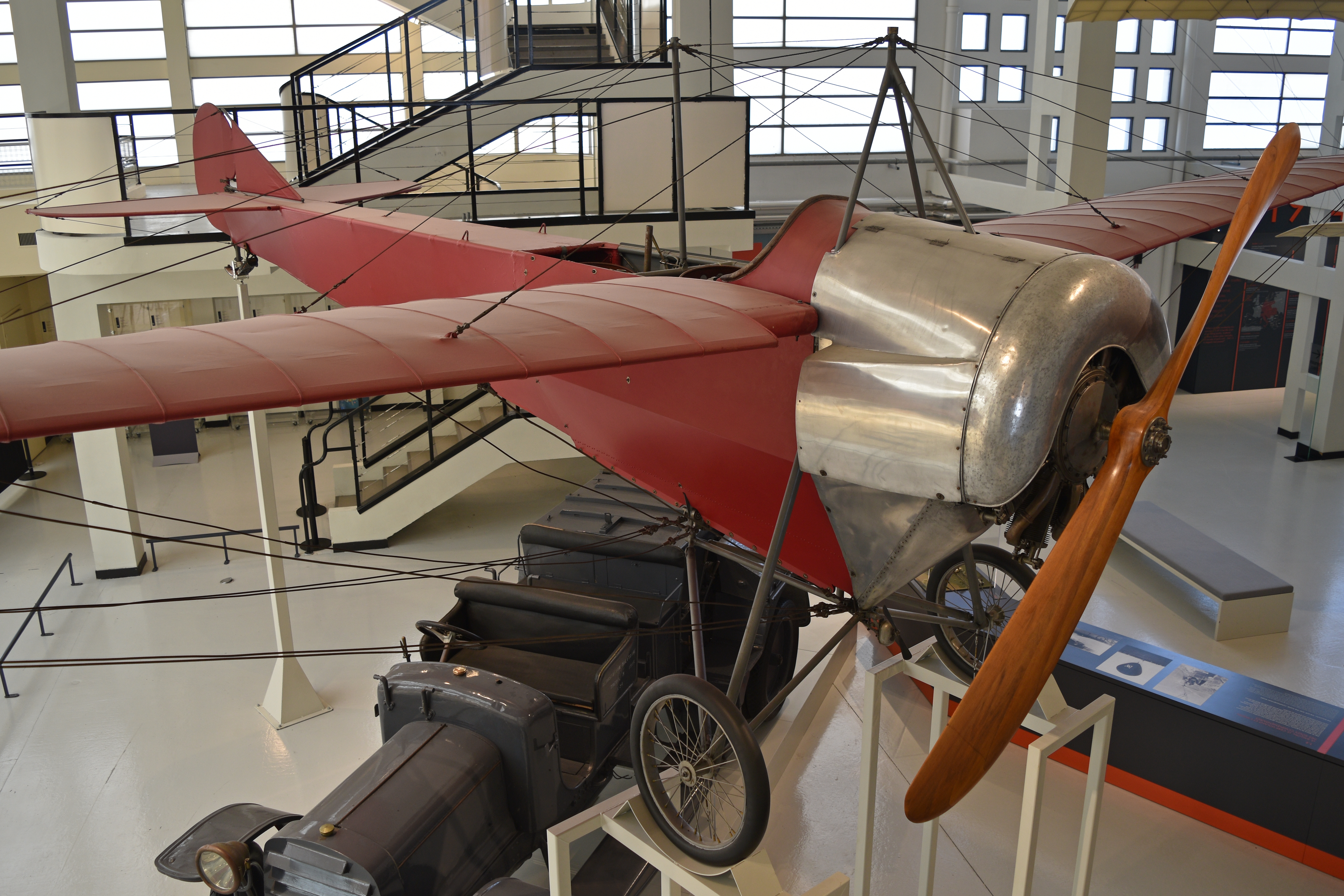

General information
- Type: Sport aircraft
- National origin: France
- Manufacturer: Robert Esnault-Pelterie
- Designer: Robert Esnault-Pelterie

History
- First flight: 1913
- Developed from: REP Type B

The REP Type K was a sport aircraft designed and produced in France by Robert Esnault-Pelterie. beginning in 1913. Unlike his first designs, it was of conventional configuration, one of a family of related aircraft he produced around this time. A military version was produced in 1914.

== Design ==
The two-seat Type K was very similar to other REP designs of the same period. It was a conventional, shoulder-wing monoplane which seated the pilot and a single passenger in tandem in an open cockpit. It had conventional tailskid undercarriage and was powered by a piston engine in the nose driving a tractor propeller. Lateral control was via wing-warping and the aircraft featured a joystick for pitch and roll control. and a footbar for its rudder. Unusually for the day, the fuselage and tail structure was of steel tube. Some examples had a triangular fin, others had a comma-shaped fin.

== Operational history ==
A Type K was exhibited at the 1913 Paris Aero Show.

These aircraft saw brief service with the French Army in the months before World War I. It proved ineffective in its role as a reconnaissance aircraft because its large wings obstructed the view of the ground. The Type Ks were quickly withdrawn from service.

One example, construction number 27, is preserved at the Musée de l'air et de l'espace ("Air and Space Museum") in Paris.

== Specifications ==
General characteristics

- Crew: 1 pilot
- Capacity: 1 passenger
- Powerplant: 1 × Gnome Lambda air-cooled, seven-cylinder, rotary engine, 60 kW (80 hp)

== Notes ==
=== Bibliography ===
- Devaux, Jean; Marani, Michel (April 1996). "Le mysterieux 'REP' Type D du musée de l'air et de l'espace" [The mysterious REP Type D of the Air and Space Museum]. Pégase : revue de l'association des amis du musée de l'air [Pegasus: magazine of the association of the friends of the Air Museum] (in French). No. 81. Paris: L'association des amis du musée de l'air. pp. 4–7.
- The Illustrated Encyclopedia of Aircraft. London: Aerospace Publishing.
- Munson, Kenneth (1969). Pioneer Aircraft 1903–14. London: Blandford.
- Opdycke, Leonard E. (1999). French Aeroplanes Before the Great War. Atglen, PA: Schiffer.
- "The Paris Aero Salon 1913: Fifth article". Flight. Vol. 6, no. 2. London: Flight. 10 January 1914. pp. 31–33.
- "REP type K". Le Musée de l'Air et de l'Espace (in French). Paris: Musée de l’Air et de l’Espace. 2019.
- "Robert Esnault-Pelterie". L'Aéronautique [Aeronautics] (in French). Vol. 5, no. 55. Paris: Gauther–Villars. December 1923. n.p.
