= Avro Heritage Museum =

Aviation museum in Greater Manchester, England

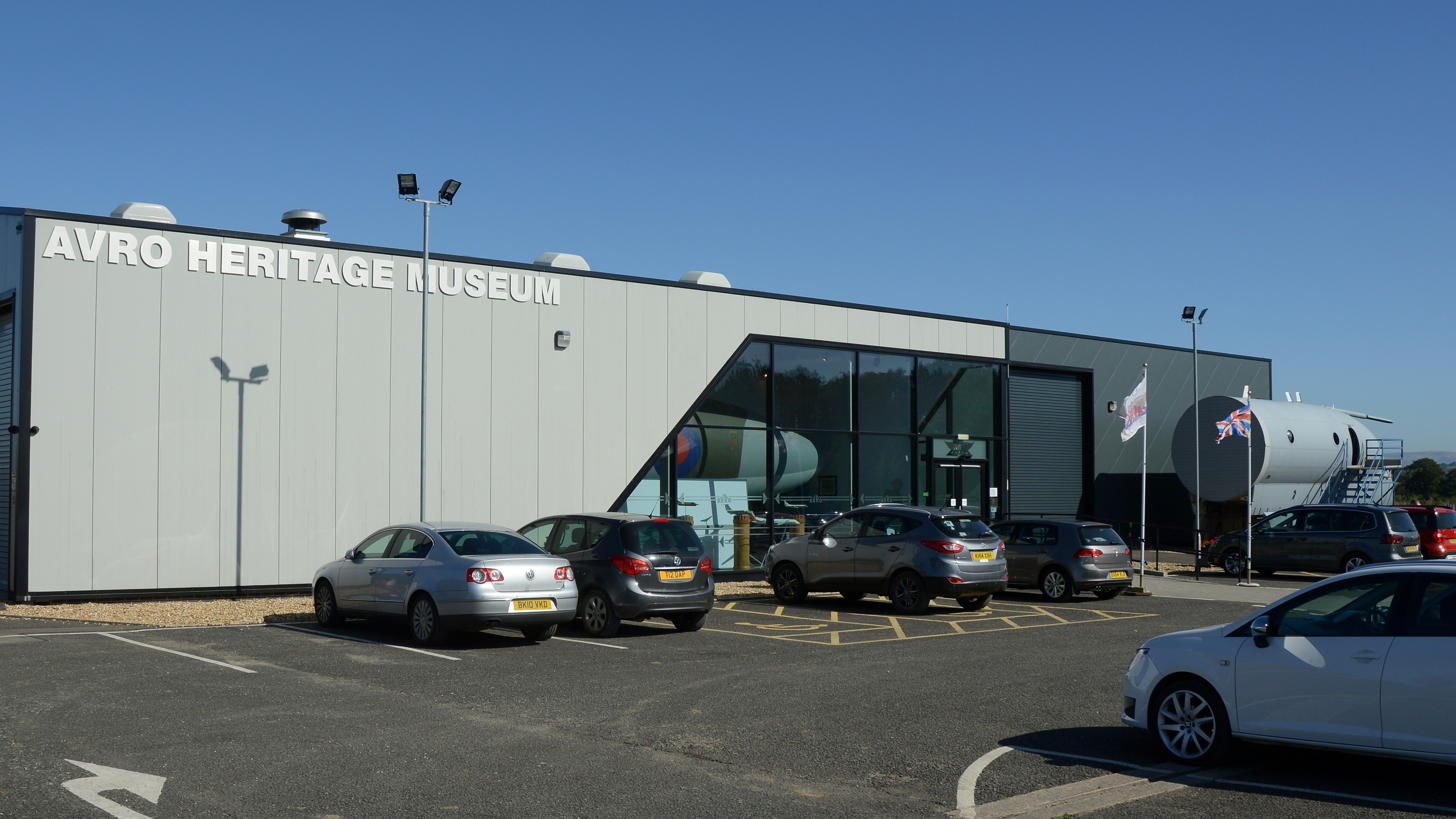
- The front of the museum

- Location within Greater Manchester
- Former name: Avro Heritage Centre
- Established: 13 November 2015
- Location: Woodford Aerodrome, Woodford, Greater Manchester, England
- Coordinates: 53°20′06″N 2°09′08″W
- Website: www.avroheritagemuseum.co.uk

Avro Heritage Museum is an aviation museum in Woodford, Greater Manchester, England, that opened on 13 November 2015. It is located at the former Woodford Aerodrome, and it replaced the former Avro Heritage Centre.

== History ==
=== Avro Heritage Centre ===
Originally opened in Woodford's personnel block, the centre had five rooms with displays and photos about Avro, an archive, and a small shop. It was only open for tours on Tuesdays and Thursdays, and visits were only possible by prior appointment.

=== Avro Heritage Museum ===
As part of the deal to sell Woodford Aerodrome for redevelopment in December 2011, BAE agreed to fund the renovation of the former aerodrome fire station to become the new Avro Heritage Museum. Designed to replace the previous heritage centre, the work was carried out by Conlon Construction and Cassidy + Ashton. Plans were submitted in February 2014; planning permission was approved on 20 May; construction started in August; and the museum opened on 13 November 2015. At 11,700 square feet (1,090 m^{2}), the new building is 70% larger than the previous centre and includes an exhibition hall, a gallery, a café, reading rooms, and classrooms.

It holds the Avro Heritage Trust's collection of over 30,000 artefacts on aircraft development, including a set of murals that used to be located in Woodford's employee restaurant.

The museum announced plans for an expansion in October 2024 and received approval for it in January 2026.

== Aircraft on display ==
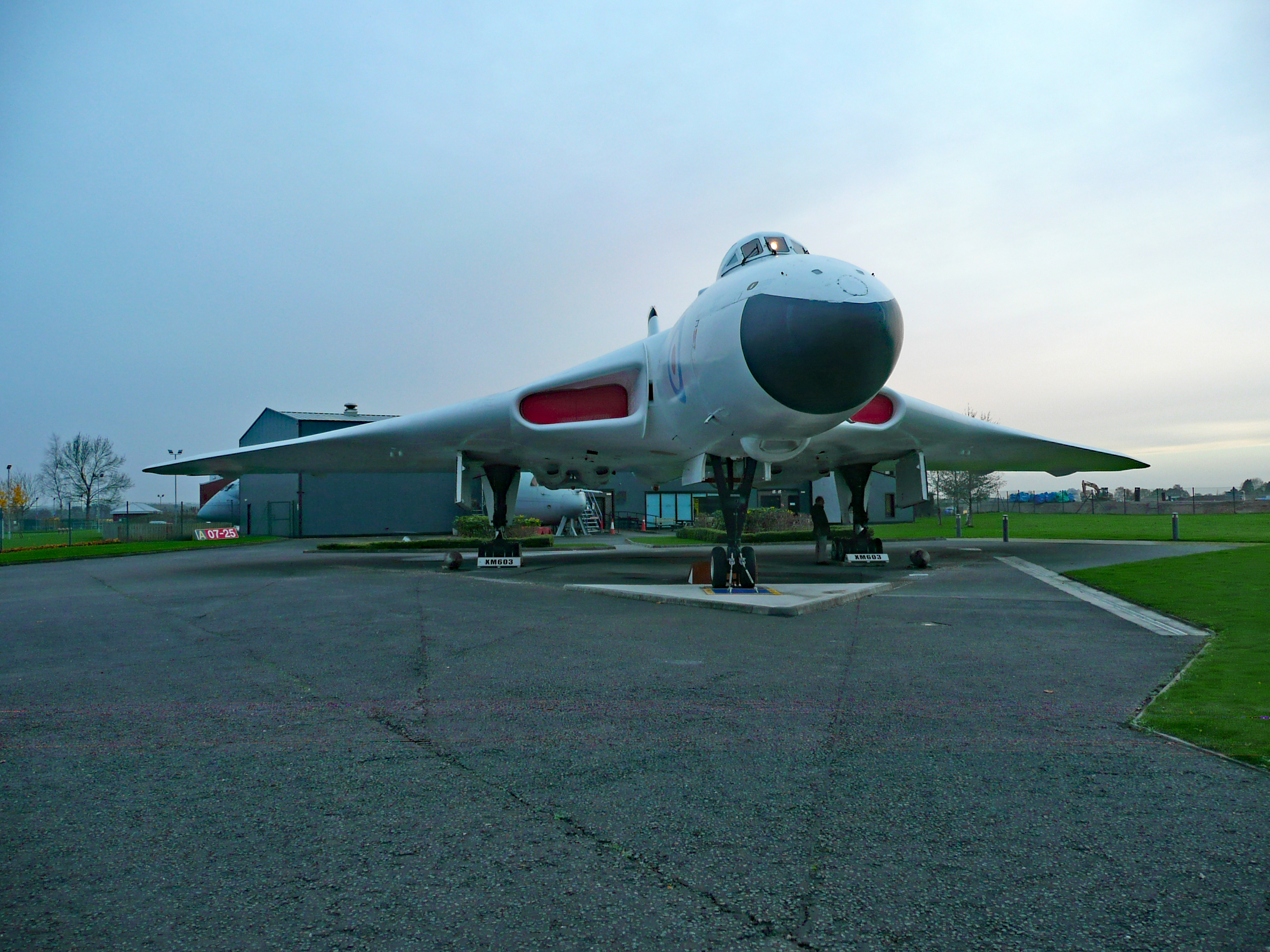
Avro Vulcan XM603

- Avro Vulcan B.2 XM603
- Avro Type F – Replica
- Roe I Triplane – Replica

=== Cockpits ===
- Avro Anson XIX G-AGPG
- Avro Lancaster B.I R5868 "S for Sugar" – replica
- Avro Vulcan B2 XM602
- English Electric Canberra WK118
- Hawker Siddeley 748 1756
- Hawker Siddeley Nimrod MR.2 XV235
- Vickers VC10 C1K XV106 – on loan

== See also ==
- List of aerospace museums
