= Walter Atom =

1930s Czech piston aircraft engine

Atom
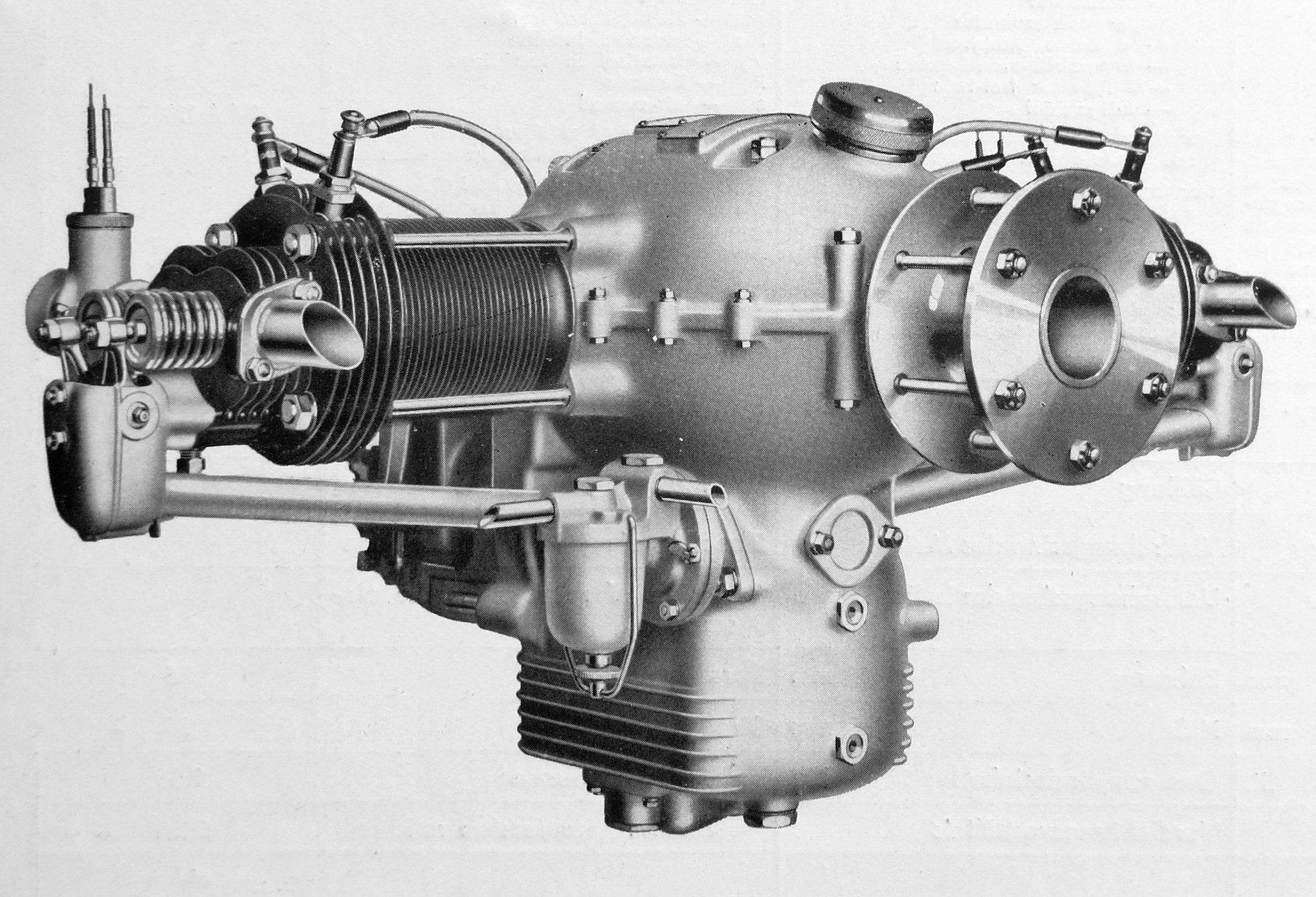
- Type: Piston aircraft engine
- National origin: Czechoslovakia
- Manufacturer: Walter Aircraft Engines
- First run: 1934

The Walter Atom is a Czechoslovak air-cooled horizontal two-cylinder engine used on light aircraft. It was first produced in 1934.

== Specifications (Atom) ==
=== General characteristics ===
- Type: Horizontally-opposed 2 cylinder air-cooled
- Bore: 85 mm (3.35 in)
- Stroke: 96 mm (3.78 in)
- Displacement: 1.09 L (66.5 cu in)
- Length: 510 mm (20.08 in)
- Width: 815 mm (32.09 in)
- Height: 409 mm (16.10 in)
- Dry weight: 40 kg (88.2 lb)

=== Components ===
- Valvetrain: 1 inlet and one exhaust valve per cylinder
- Fuel system: 2 Amal carburettors
- Fuel type: 68 octane
- Cooling system: air

=== Performance ===
- Power output: 21 kW (28 hp) at 3000 RPM
- Compression ratio: 5.2:1
- Power-to-weight ratio: 2.14 kg/kW (3.52 lb/hp) at cruise

== See also ==
Comparable engines

- ABC Scorpion
- Aeronca E-113
- Armstrong Siddeley Ounce
- Bristol Cherub

Related lists

- List of aircraft engines
