= Armstrong Siddeley Ounce =

1920s British piston aircraft engine

Ounce
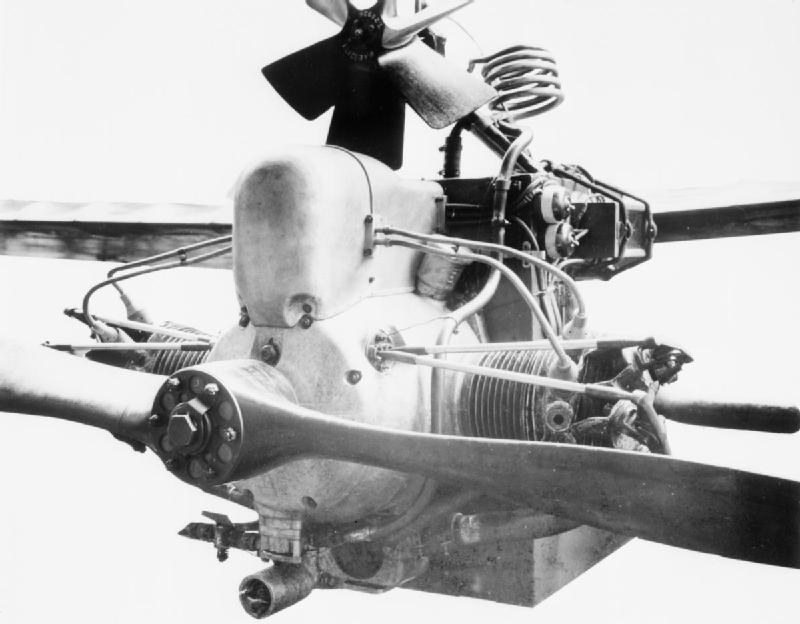
- Type: Piston engine
- National origin: United Kingdom
- Manufacturer: Armstrong Siddeley
- First run: 1920

The Armstrong Siddeley Ounce was a small two-cylinder aero engine developed by Armstrong Siddeley in 1920. The engine was originally conceived as a test piece but ran very well and was put into production for early ultralight aircraft and use in target drones. The Ounce used two cylinders from the preceding Jaguar I radial engine.

== Applications ==
- Bristol Babe
- 1920 redesigns of the '1917 Type Aerial Target'

== Specifications (Ounce) ==
Data from Lumsden.

=== General characteristics ===
- Type: Two cylinder, horizontally-opposed air cooled piston engine
- Bore: 5.0 in (127 mm)
- Stroke: 5.0 in (127 mm)
- Displacement: 196 cu in (3.2 L)
- Length: 20.5 in (521 mm)
- Width: 39.5 in (1003 mm)
- Height: 24.5 in (622 mm)
- Dry weight: 170 lb (77 kg)

=== Components ===
- Valvetrain: Overhead valve
- Fuel system: Carburettor
- Cooling system: Air cooled

=== Performance ===
- Power output: 45 hp (33.5 kW) at 1,500 rpm
- Compression ratio: 5:1
- Power-to-weight ratio: 0.26 hp/lb (0.43 kW/kg)

== See also ==
Comparable engines

- ABC Scorpion
- Aeronca E-113
- Bristol Cherub
- Walter Atom

Related lists

- List of aircraft engines
