= Viali =

Viali is a surname. Notable people with the surname include:

- Tonino Viali (born 1960), Italian middle distance runner
- William Viali (born 1974), Italian footballer and manager

== See also ==
- Viali di Circonvallazione, streets in Florence, Italy
- Viale (surname)
