= Robert Esnault-Pelterie =

French aircraft and rocket pioneer (1881–1957)

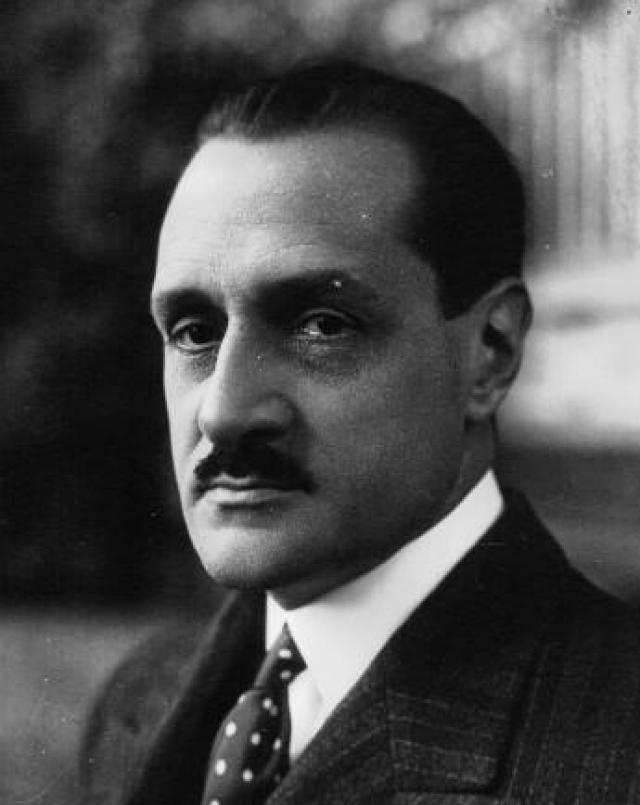
- Robert Esnault-Pelterie
- Born: 8 November 1881; Paris, France
- Died: 6 December 1957 (aged 76); Nice, France
- Engineering career
- Significant advance: Aircraft; Rocketry

Robert Albert Charles Esnault-Pelterie (French pronunciation: [ʁɔbɛʁ albɛʁ ʃaʁl eno pɛltəʁi]; (Note: Despite the common pronunciation [ɛsno].) 8 November 1881 – 6 December 1957) was a French aircraft designer and spaceflight theorist. He is referred to as being one of the founders of modern rocketry and astronautics, along with the Russian Konstantin Tsiolkovsky, the Chinese Qian Xuesen, the Germans Hermann Oberth, Wernher von Braun and the American Robert H. Goddard.

== Biography ==
He was born on 8 November 1881 in Paris to a textile industrialist. He was educated at the Faculté des Sciences, studying engineering at the Sorbonne.

He served in World War I and was made an Officier de la Légion d'Honneur.

In November 1928, on board the Ile de France while sailing to New York City, he was married to Carmen Bernaldo de Quirós, the daughter of Don Antonio and Yvonne Cabarrus, and granddaughter of General Marquis of Santiago, Grandee of Spain, Head of the Military Household of Queen Isabella II.

He died on 6 December 1957 in Nice, France.

== REP ==
Esnault-Pelterie developed and manufactured aeroplanes and aero engines under the name REP.

=== Aeroplanes ===
His first experiments in aviation were based on the Wright brothers 1902 glider. His first glider design was tested on a beach near Calais, but was not successful. His glider was based upon an incomplete understanding of the Wright glider, and although using a version of the wing-warping which the Wright brothers had used to control their aircraft this did not work properly and was abandoned, since he considered it dangerous. After condemning the Wright brothers' approach, he developed the concept of the aileron, fitting a pair of mid-gap control surfaces in front of the wings. This potentially "initial" example of the use of ailerons of any sort is believed to pre-date all others, after their patent description in 1868 by British inventor M. P. W. Boulton was approved in that year.

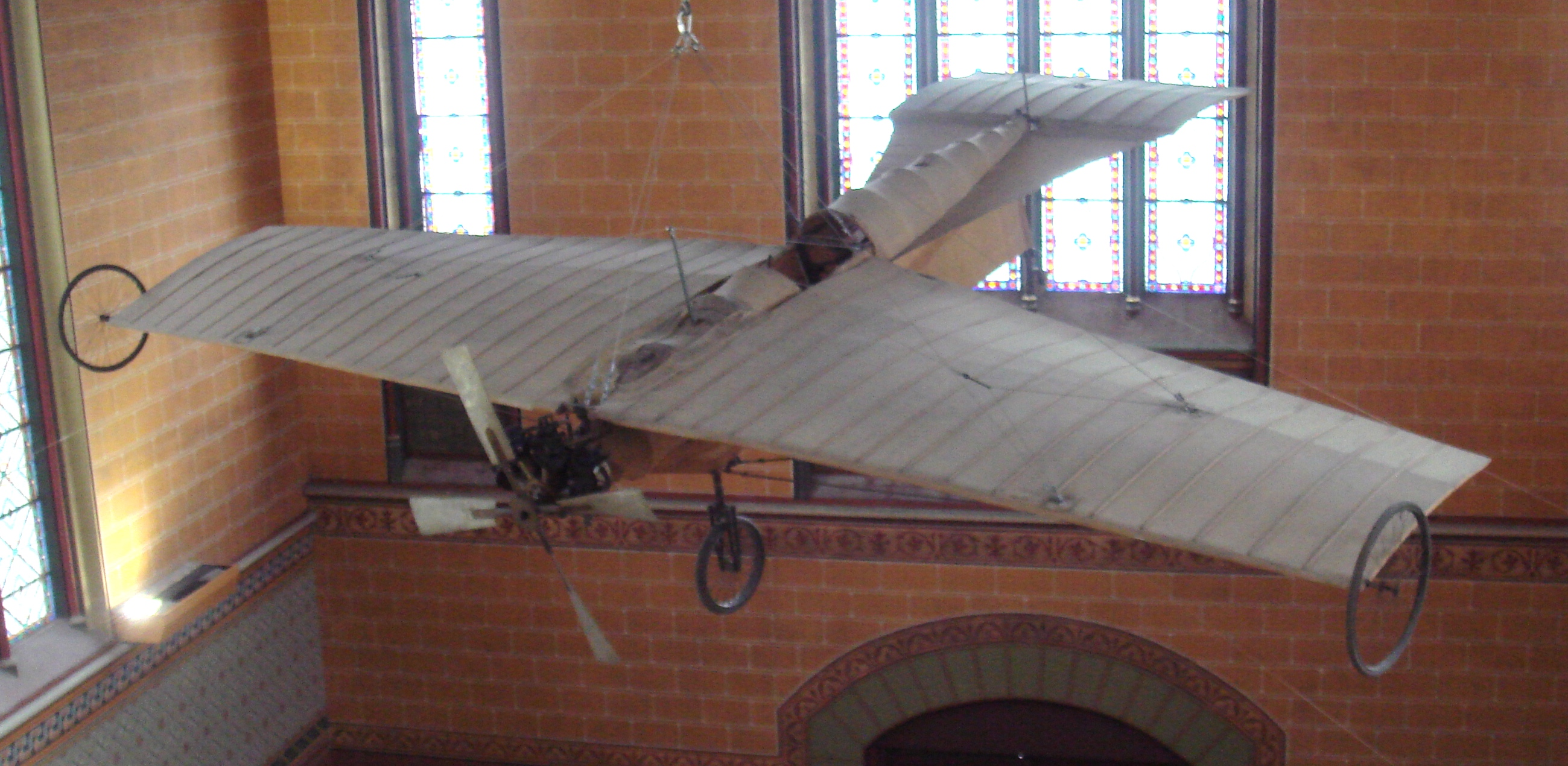
Esnault-Pelterie airplane 1908.

In 1906 he began his first experiments in towed flight. On 19 September 1906 he flew 500 m (1,600 ft). He made his first powered flight on 10 October 1907, a distance of 100 m (330 ft) with the REP 1. This was driven by a seven-cylinder, 30 hp air-cooled engine of his own design.

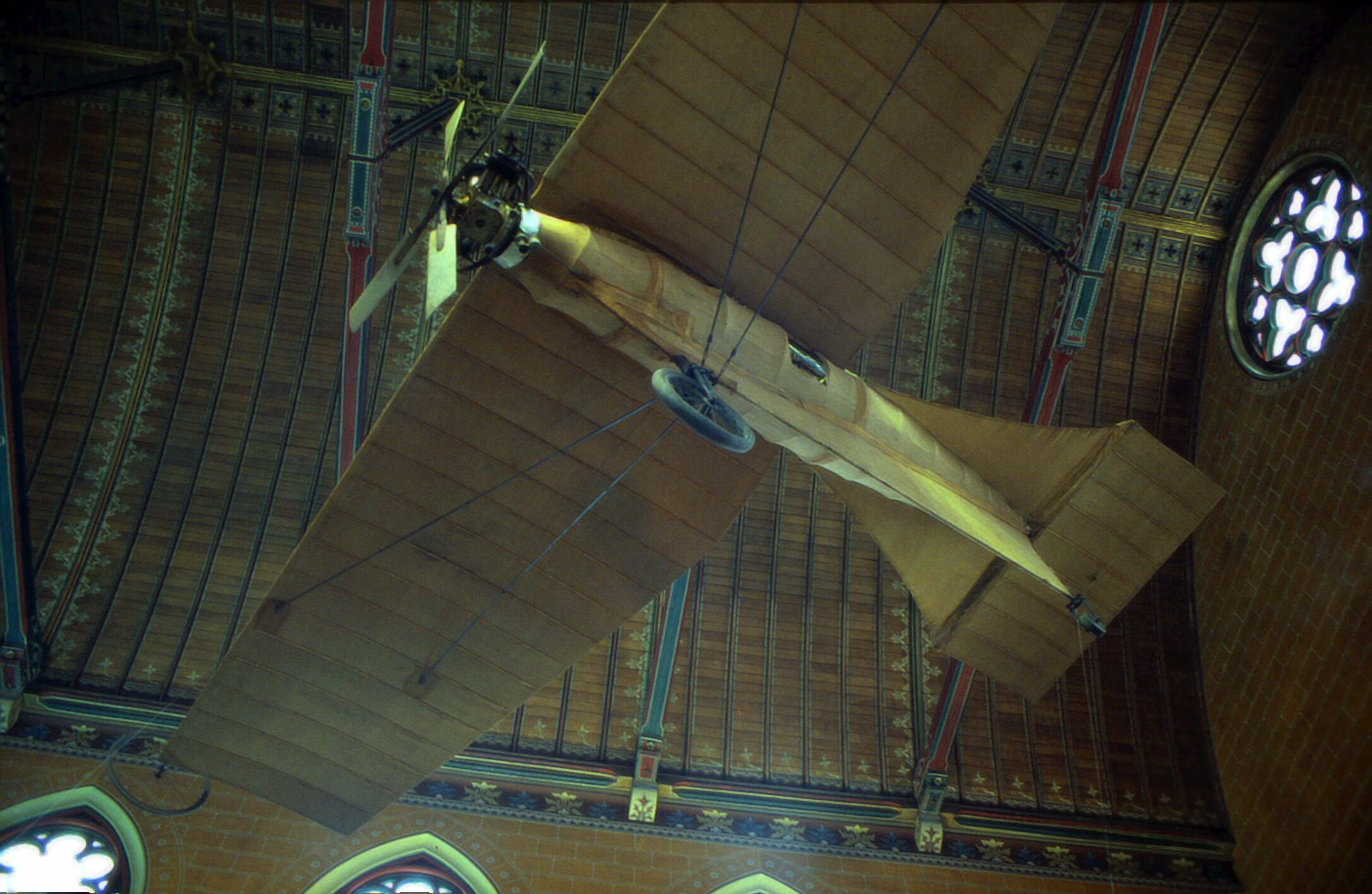
Avion Esnault-Pelterie, 1908

Trials of the monoplane REP 2 began on 8 June 1908. This aircraft set a record with a 1,200 m (3,900 ft) flight, reaching an altitude of 30 m (98 ft). After a modified version of this plane was flown for the last time in 1909 at Rheims, Pelterie stopped flying and instead focused on the development and manufacture of aircraft.

The Vickers R.E.P. Type Monoplane was based upon his designs, and marked the beginning of aircraft production at the later Vickers Limited. In 1912 he introduced the REP Type N and in 1914 the REP Parasol monoplane.

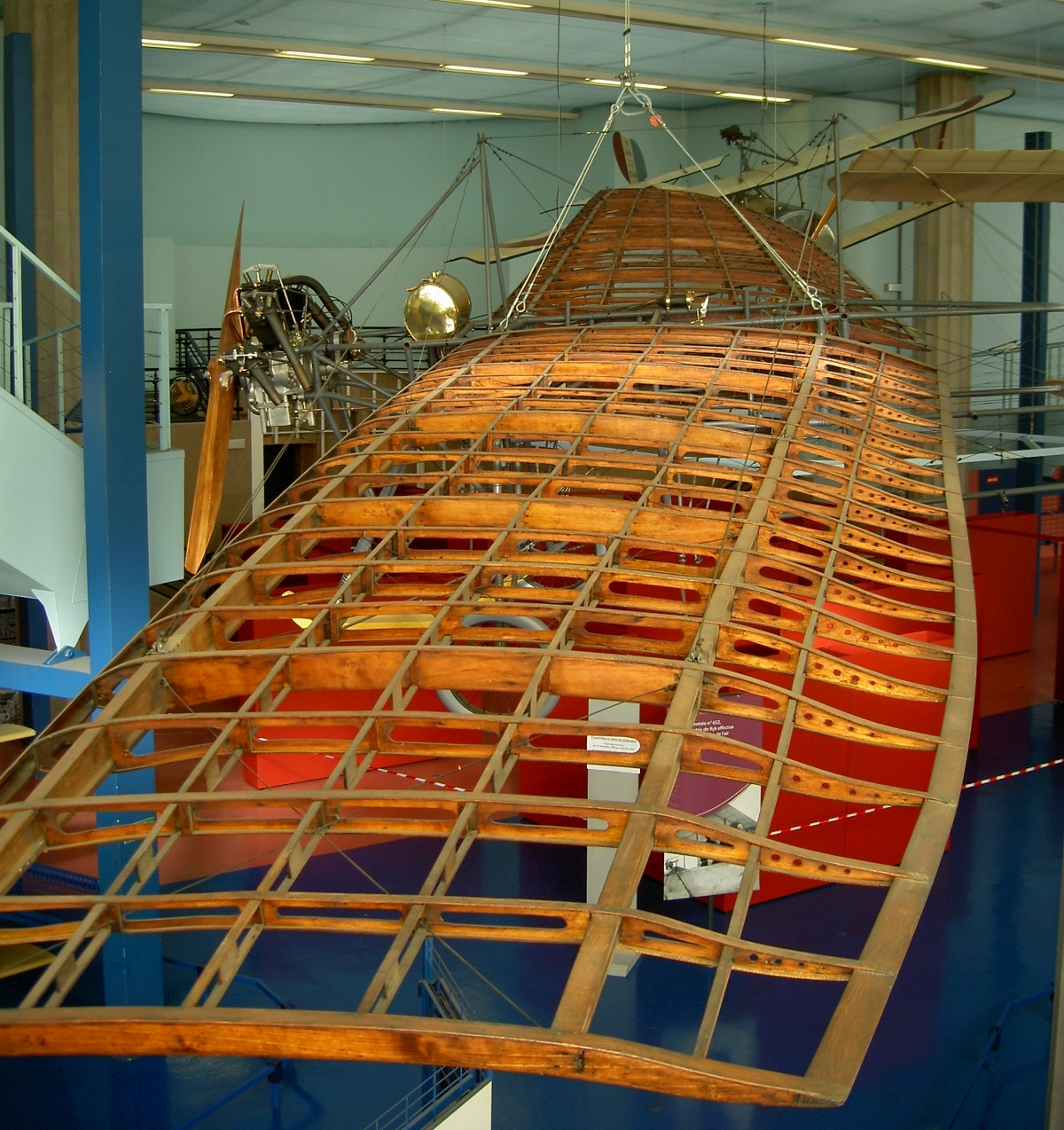
The wing structure of the R.E.P Type D Monoplane, 1911.

His family had invested heavily to fund his aircraft designs, and this had left them nearly financially ruined. However, he was the inventor of the "joystick" flight control, and owned a patent on the design. This would end up being integrated during 1908, into fellow French aviator Louis Blériot's eighth design, setting the pattern for future "user interfaces" in aircraft flight control system design. Following the war, Esnault-Pelterie was involved in litigation over his joystick patent. Many aircraft built during the war had used this design and the aircraft companies owed him royalties. The damages he won and subsequent royalties made him a wealthy man. This also allowed him to repay his father's significant investment.

=== Aero engines ===
Esnault-Pelterie designed and built his own aero engines. He also sold them under the name R.E.P. They were all of an unusual multiple-banked fan or half-radial type. The first design featured seven cylinders double-banked, with four in one bank and three in the other, and was rated at 30 horsepower (22 kW). A later model doubled them up to create a 14 cylinder quadruple-banked engine giving 60 horsepower (45 kW).

== Rocketry ==
He became interested in space travel, and, not knowing of Tsiolkovsky's 1903 work, in 1913 produced a paper that presented the rocket equation and calculated the energies required to reach the Moon and nearby planets. In this talk, he proposed the use of atomic energy, using 400 kg of radium to power an interplanetary vehicle. His culminating work was L'Astronautique, published in 1930. A later version published in 1934 included details on interplanetary travel and applications of nuclear power.

On 8 June 1927 Esnault-Pelterie gave a symposium for the Société astronomique de France (French Astronomical Society) titled L'exploration par fusées de la très haute atmosphère et la possibilité des voyages interplanétaires, concerning the exploration of outer space using rocket propulsion. Jean-Jacques Barré attended this lecture, and developed a correspondence with Esnault-Pelterie on the topic of rockets.

In 1929 Esnault-Pelterie proposed the idea of the ballistic missile for military bombardment. By 1930, Esnault-Pelterie and Barré had persuaded the French War Department to fund a study of the concept. In 1931, the two began experimenting with various types of rocket propulsion systems, including liquid propellants. The same year he ran a demonstration of a rocket engine powered with gasoline and liquid oxygen. During an experiment with a rocket design using tetra-nitromethane he lost four fingers from his right hand during an explosion. Ultimately, their work failed to create an interest in rocketry within France.

== Prix REP-Hirsch ==
The Prix REP-Hirsch was an international award of the Société astronomique de France given in recognition of the study of interplanetary travel and astronautics. Established by Esnault-Pelterie and André-Louis Hirsch, a Parisian banker and science enthusiast, it was the first prize for astronautics in the world. The award was given "to recognize the best original scientific work, theoretical or experimental, that is able to advance one of the questions related to the realisation of space travel, or to increase human understanding of one of the branches related to the science of astronautics." The idea for establishing the prize originated during a dinner Hirsch and Esnault-Pelterie organised in Paris on 26 December 1927. The guests discussed the emerging science of space travel, which they called “astronautics” at the suggestion of science fiction writer J.H. Rosny the elder. Hirsch and Esnault-Pelterie provided funds – 5,000 francs annually for 1928, 1929, and 1930 – to the Société astronomique de France, for an annual award in astronautics in their names. A Comité d'Astronautique was established to manage the prize. In addition to Esnault-Pelterie, Hirsch, and Rosny the elder, it included General Gustave-Auguste Ferrié (President), Jean Perrin and Eugène Fichot (Vice-Presidents) and other expert members. The prize was awarded for 10 years. In 1936, the name of the award changed from the Prix REP-Hirsch to the Prix International d'Astronautique (International Astronautics Prize). The laureates were:

- 1929 — Hermann Oberth, for his overall contributions to the field.
- 1931 — Pierre Montagne, for his theoretical work on the equilibrium of gas temperatures inside combustion chambers.
- 1934 — Pierre Montagne, for his work on chemical equilibria in chemical reactions and their application to rockets, and Ary Sternfeld (Prix d'Encouragement), for his book Initiation à la Cosmonautique.
- 1935 — Louis Damblanc, for his innovations in solid propellants for rockets.
- 1936 — American Rocket Society and Alfred Africano,
- 1938 — Giovanni Serragli, for his publication Recherches sur les poudres lentes et leur usage pour l'exploration de la haute atmosphère.
- 1939 — Frank J. Malina (Médaille de vermeil) and Nathan Carver (Médaille d'argent).

Though the award was short-lived, it helped stimulate interest in the new science of astronautics and encouraged early pioneers in the field.

- 2019 — Jacques Blamont

== Legacy ==
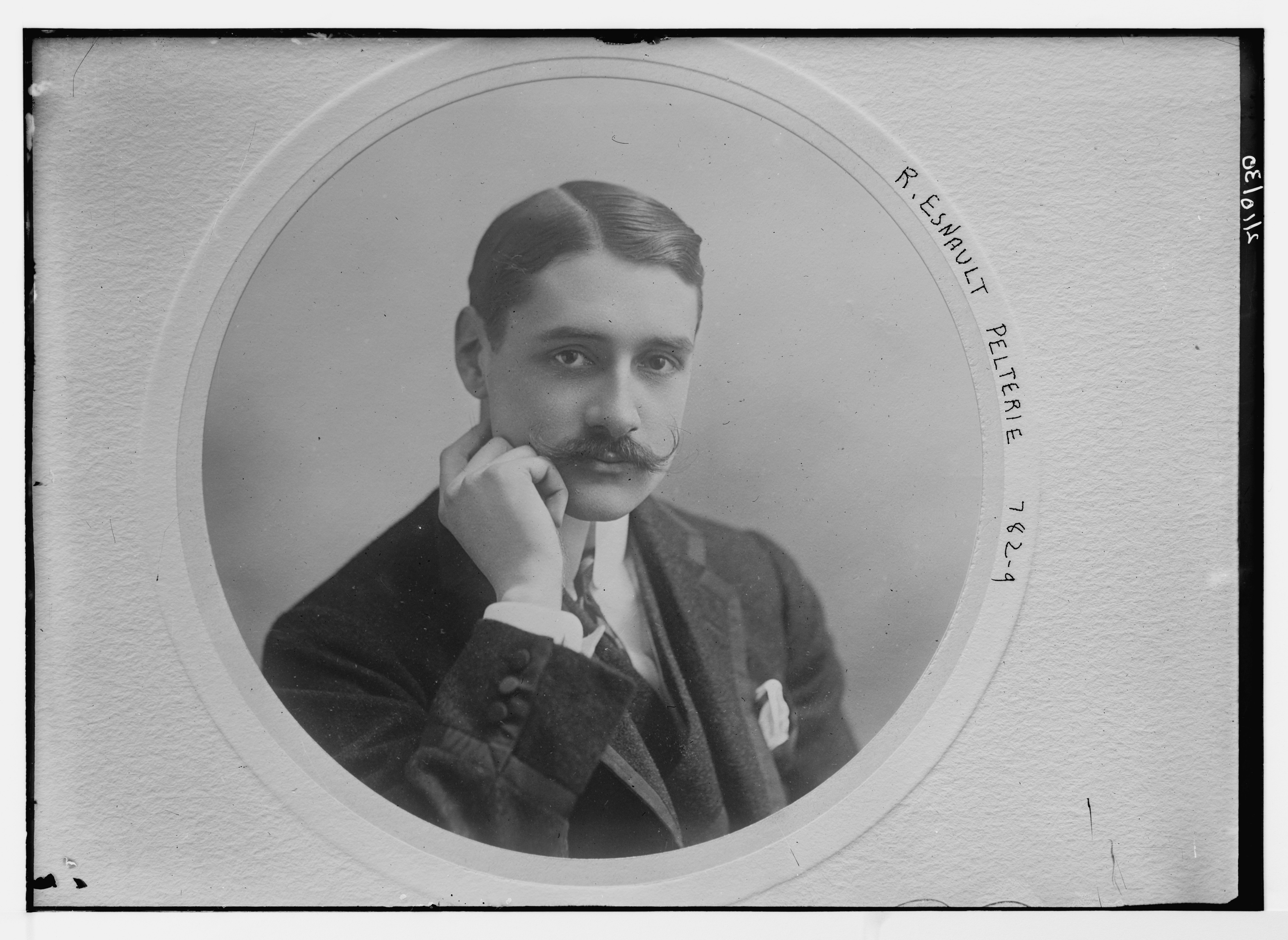
Robert Esnault-Pelterie

Among his interests were horseback riding, playing golf, camping and driving cars. During his lifetime he filed about 120 patents in a variety of fields ranging from metallurgy to automobile suspension. He was the inventor of the "center stick" aircraft control and of a new type of fuel pump. He also developed the idea of rocket maneuver by means of vectored thrust.

== Honors ==
- In 1930, he received the Prix Jules Janssen, the highest award of the Société astronomique de France, the French astronomical society.
- He was elected to the French Academy of Sciences in 1936.
- The crater Esnault-Pelterie on the far side of the Moon was named after him in 1970.
- An avenue in Paris (rue Robert Esnault-Pelterie in the 7th arr.) is named after him.
- Inducted as a member of the inaugural class to the International Space Hall of Fame.

== Works by Esnault-Pelterie ==
- L'Astronautique, Paris, A. Lahure, 1930.
- L'Astronautique-Complément, Paris, Société des Ingénieurs Civils de France, 1935.

== See also ==
- French space program
- CNES
- Space sciences
- Qian Xuesen
- Wernher von Braun
- Sergey Korolyov
- History of rockets
- Hermann Oberth
- Konstantin Tsiolkovsky
