= Viale 35 hp =

Aircraft engine

35 hp
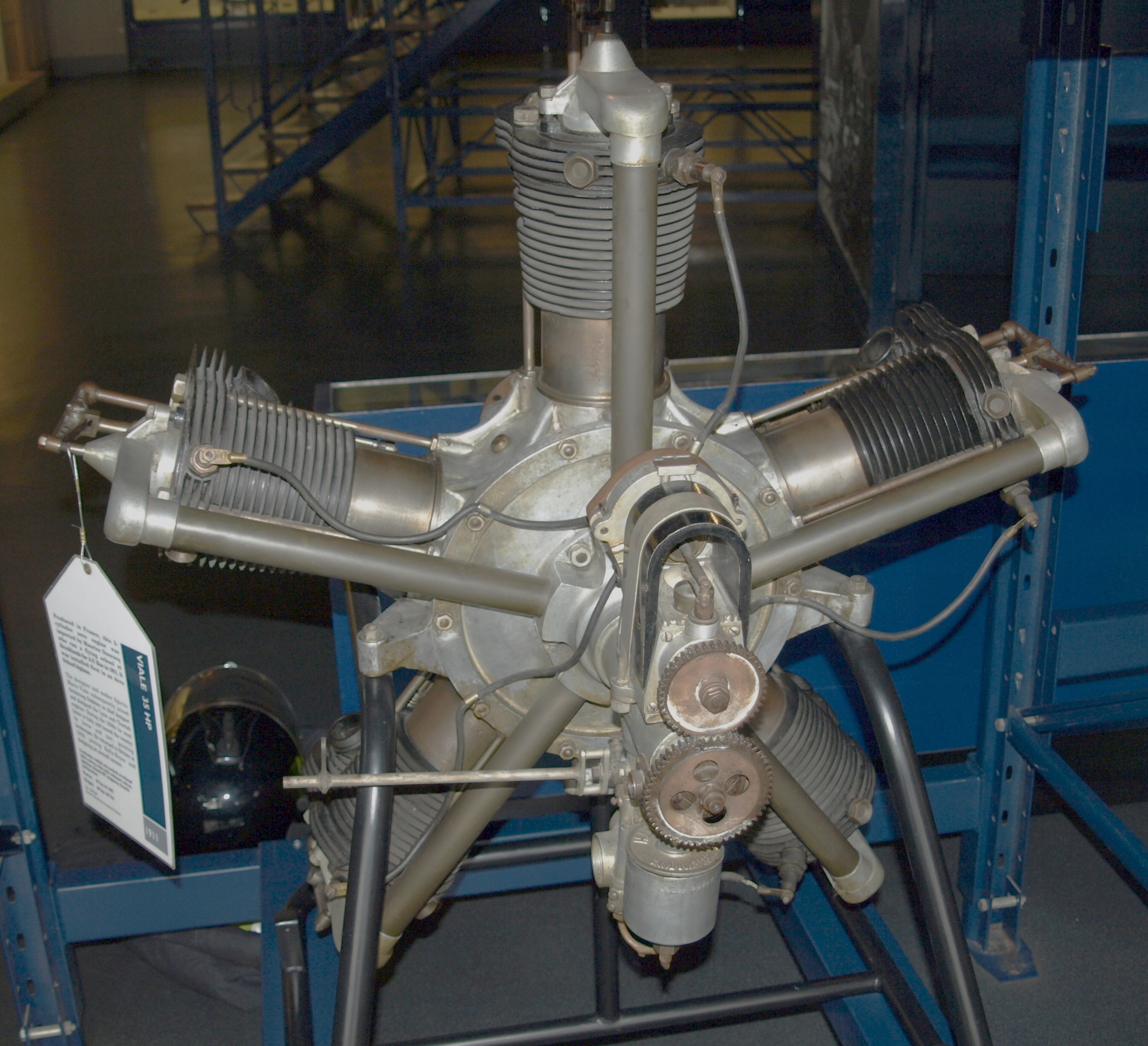
- Preserved Viale 35 hp at the London Science Museum
- Type: Radial aero engine
- National origin: France
- Manufacturer: Spirito Mario Viale
- First run: c. 1910
- Major applications: Avro Type F

The Viale 35 hp was a five-cylinder, air-cooled, radial engine for aircraft use designed and built in France by the Italian engine designer Spirito Mario Viale, that was first run around 1910. It developed 35 horsepower (26 kW). Three- and seven-cylinder variants of the same engine were built, although little is known about them.

== Applications ==
- Bristol Babe
- Avro Type D
- Avro Type F

== Engines on display ==
A preserved Viale 35 hp engine is on display at the Science museum in London. This engine is believed to be the unit that powered the sole example of the Avro Type F and was later used in the prototype Bristol Babe designed by Frank Barnwell. A replica engine was built for the Avro Type F replica when it was displayed at museum of science and industry in Manchester, (MOSI). The museum has since been renamed Science and Industry Museum.

== Specifications (Viale 35 hp) ==
=== General characteristics ===
- Type: 5-cylinder single-row radial
- Designer: Spirito Mario Viale

=== Components ===
- Valvetrain: Single overhead inlet valve, twin sidevalve exhaust valves.
- Fuel system: Zenith carburettor
- Fuel type: 40-50 octane petrol
- Cooling system: Air-cooled
- Reduction gear: Direct drive, right-hand tractor

=== Performance ===
- Power output: 35 hp (26 kW)

== See also ==
Comparable engines

- Armstrong Siddeley Genet

Related lists

- List of aircraft engines
