= Astronautics =

Theory and practice of space travel

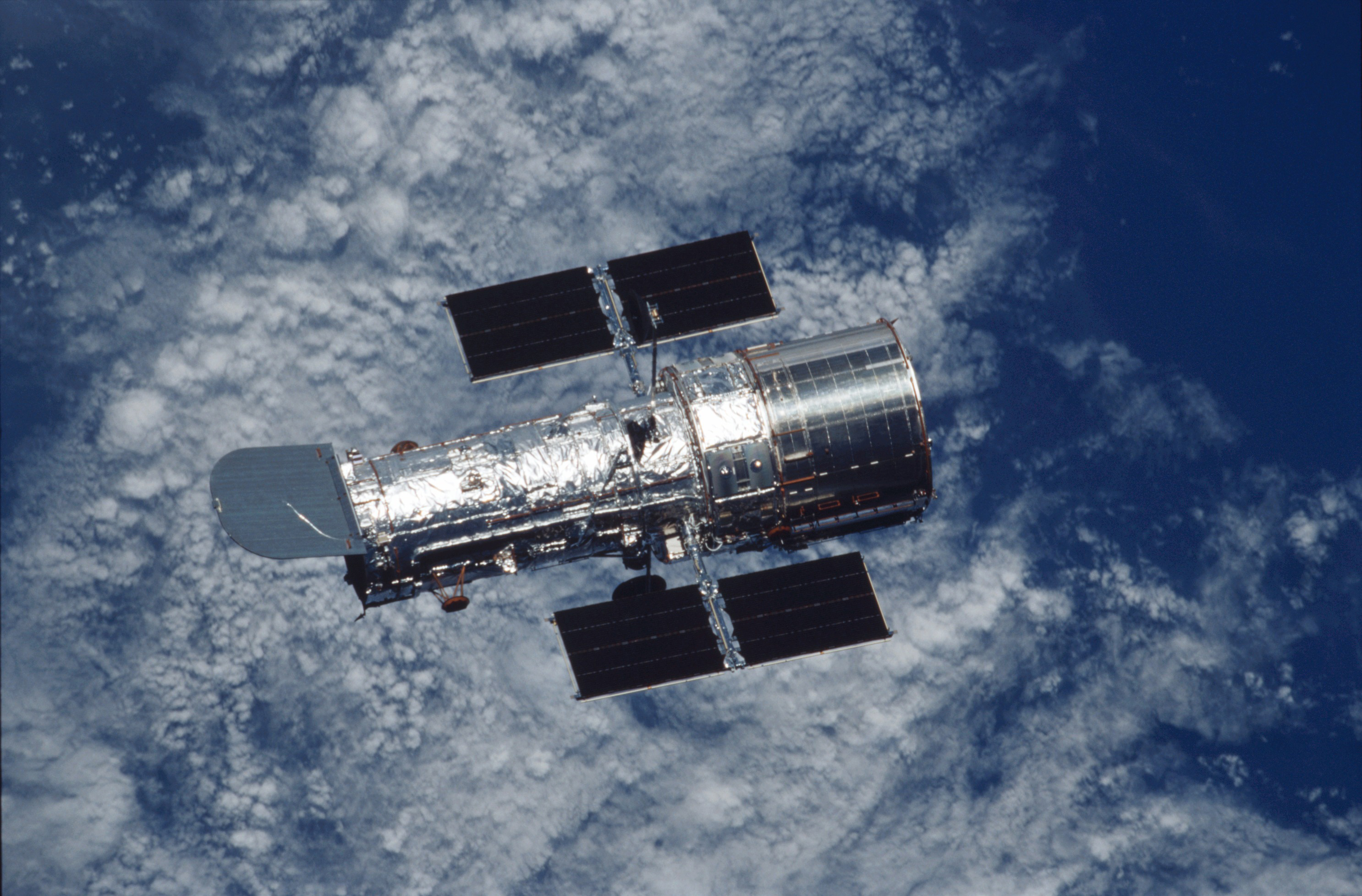
Hubble Space Telescope over Earth (during the STS-109 mission)

Astronautics (or cosmonautics) is the practice of sending spacecraft beyond Earth's atmosphere into outer space. Spaceflight is one of its main applications and space science is its overarching field.

The term astronautics (originally astronautique in French) was coined in the 1920s by J.-H. Rosny, president of the Goncourt academy, in analogy with aeronautics. Because there is a degree of technical overlap between the two fields, the term aerospace is often used to describe both at once. In 1930, Robert Esnault-Pelterie published the first book on the new research field.

The term cosmonautics (originally cosmonautique in French) was introduced in the 1930s by Ary Sternfeld with his book Initiation à la Cosmonautique (Introduction to cosmonautics) (the book brought him the Prix REP-Hirsch, later known as the Prix d'Astronautique, of the French Astronomical Society in 1934.)

As with aeronautics, the restrictions of mass, temperatures, and external forces require that applications in space survive extreme conditions: high-grade vacuum, the radiation bombardment of interplanetary space and the magnetic belts of low Earth orbit. Space launch vehicles must withstand titanic forces, while satellites can experience huge variations in temperature in very brief periods. Extreme constraints on mass cause astronautical engineers to face the constant need to save mass in the design in order to maximize the actual payload that reaches orbit.

== History ==
The early history of astronautics is theoretical: the fundamental mathematics of space travel was established by Isaac Newton in his 1687 treatise Philosophiæ Naturalis Principia Mathematica. Other mathematicians, such as Swiss Leonhard Euler and Franco-Italian Joseph Louis Lagrange also made essential contributions in the 18th and 19th centuries. In spite of this, astronautics did not become a practical discipline until the mid-20th century. On the other hand, the question of spaceflight puzzled the literary imaginations of such figures as Jules Verne and H. G. Wells. At the beginning of the 20th century, Russian cosmist Konstantin Tsiolkovsky derived the rocket equation, the governing equation for a rocket-based propulsion, enabling computation of the final velocity of a rocket from the mass of spacecraft ($m_1$), combined mass of propellant and spacecraft ($m_0$) and exhaust velocity of the propellant ($v_e$).

$$\Delta v\ = v_e \ln \frac {m_0} {m_1}$$

By the early 1920s, Robert H. Goddard was developing liquid-propellant rockets, which would in a few brief decades become a critical component in the designs of such famous rockets as the V-2 and Saturn V.

The Prix d'Astronautique (Astronautics Prize) awarded by the Société astronomique de France, the French astronomical society, was the first prize on this subject. The international award, established by aviation and astronautical pioneer Robert Esnault-Pelterie and André-Louis Hirsch, was given from 1929 to 1939 in recognition of the study of interplanetary travel and astronautics.

By the mid-1950s, the Space Race between the USSR and the US had begun.

== Subdisciplines ==
Although many regard astronautics itself as a rather specialized subject, engineers and scientists working in this area must be knowledgeable in many distinct fields.

- Astrodynamics – the study of orbital motion. Those specializing in this field examine topics such as spacecraft trajectories, ballistics and celestial mechanics.
- Spacecraft propulsion – how spacecraft change orbits, and how they are launched. Most spacecraft have some variety of rocket engine, and thus most research efforts focus on some variety of rocket propulsion, such as chemical, nuclear or electric.
- Spacecraft design – a specialized form of systems engineering that centers on combining all the necessary subsystems for a particular launch vehicle or satellite.
- Controls – keeping a satellite or rocket in its desired orbit (as in spacecraft navigation) and orientation (as in attitude control).
- Space environment – although more a sub-discipline of physics rather than astronautics, the effects of space weather and other environmental issues constitute an increasingly important field of study for spacecraft designers.
- Bioastronautics

== Related fields of study ==
- Aeronautics and aerospace
- Mechanical engineering
- Physics

== See also ==
- Atmospheric reentry
- Spaceflight
- Frank Malina
- French space program
- Hermann Oberth
- Sergei Korolev
- Wernher von Braun
