= Viale Luigi Majno =

Street in Milan, Italy

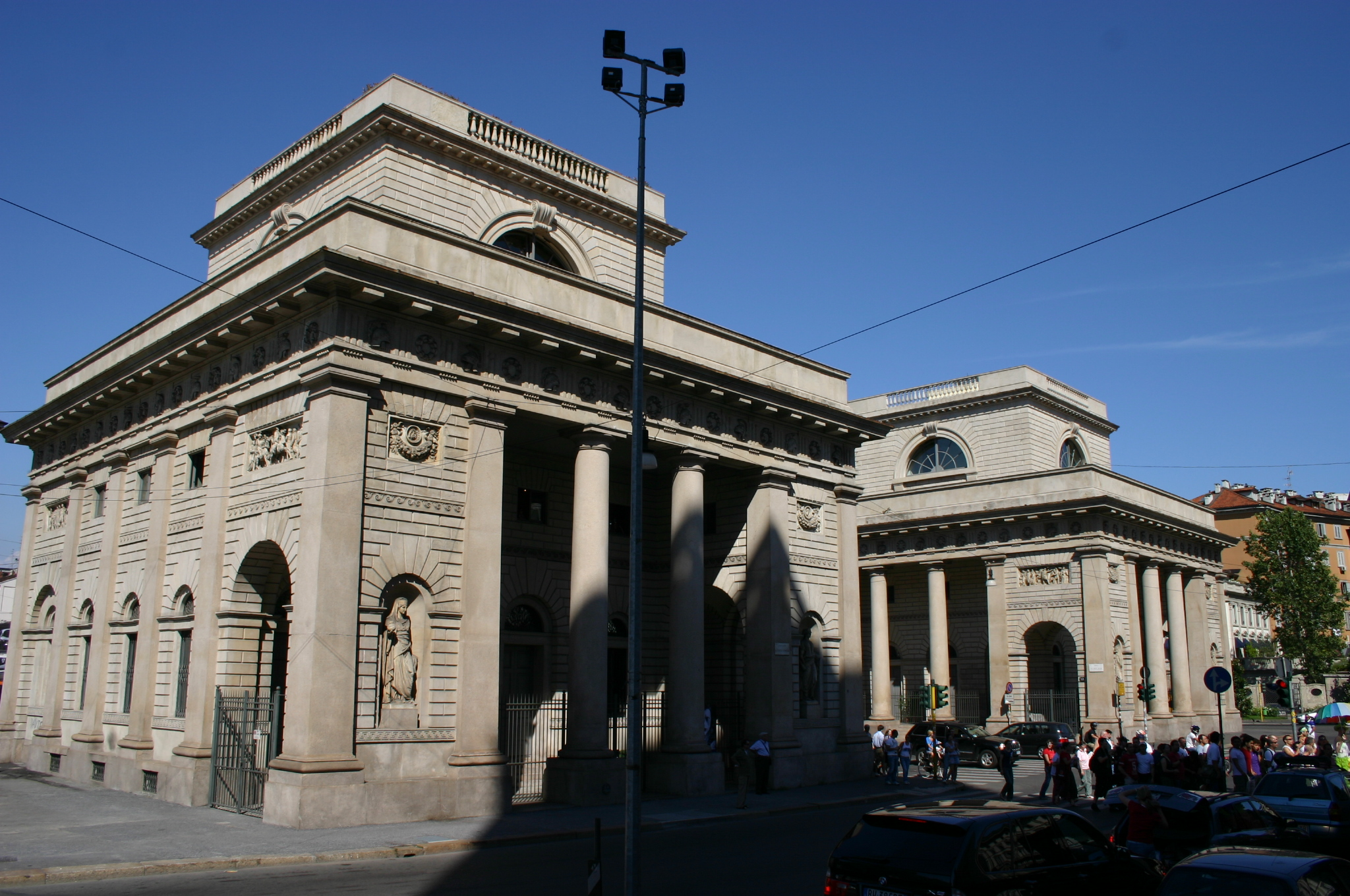
The Bastioni di Porta Venezia, at the northern edge of Viale Luigi Majno

Viale Luigi Majno (or just Viale Majno) is one of the main streets of a large residential area in the eastern part of the centre of Milan. It is named after the prominent Italian lawyer and jurist Luigi Majno (1852–1915). According to a study made by Corriere della Sera, Viale Luigi Majno is one of the most expensive residential areas of Milan, reaching up to €20,000 per square meter in some buildings.

== Location and extension ==
Viale Luigi Majno is located in the eastern part of Milan's Cerchia dei bastioni (the area of the city which was surrounded by the Spanish walls built in 1549 by Ferrante I Gonzaga and demolished between the 19th and 20th century). This street extends from Viale Bianca Maria (in the south) to Viale Città di Fiume (in the north); it is separated from the first by Piazza del Tricolore (which is traversed by Corso Monforte as well) and from the second by Piazza Guglielmo Oberdan (or just Porta Venezia). Viale Luigi Majno connects two of the busiest streets in the city: Corso Buenos Aires (and its prosecution Corso Venezia) and Corso Monforte. Although Viale Majno is only about 550 meters long, it is connected to West by (from North) Via Borghetto, Via Giuseppe Baretti, Via Gioacchino Rossini, Via Giuseppe e Francesco Carlo Maggiolini and it is connected to East (to the parallel street Viale Piave) by (from North) Via Giovanni Morelli, Via Lamberto De Bernardi and Via Ippolito Pindemonte.

== Other features ==
Viale Majno is approximately 30 meters wide. The pavements are equally sized on both the sides and are from 1.5 to 2 meters wide. The roadway is structured as follows (from East): parking lots (in line and for residents only), double-track one-way North-directed roadway, two parallel lines of trees with a concrete pathway in the middle, double-track one-way South-directed roadway, parking lots (in line and for residents only). Since Viale Majno separates two parking areas (Area 4 on West and Area 14 on East) – one of which is located in Zona di decentramento 4 although it is located the Zona di decentramento 1 (Centro Storico) – it is considered for traffic-regulation purposes an arterial-road; the speed limit is set to 50 km/h.

== Ecopass area and area c ==
Viale Luigi Majno used to constitute one of the borders of the Ecopass area of Milan. Since 16 January 2012 – when the Ecopass area was converted into the Area C – Viale Luigi Majno represents the border of the new congestion area. Since the newly established Area C is delimited by the same borders of the Ecopass area, the buildings on the western side of Viale Luigi Majno (with odd numbers) are considered to be in the Area C (even if the main entrances are located outside the Area C), while the buildings on the eastern side (with even numbers) are considered to be outside the area.

== Buildings and daily sun exposure ==
Since Viale Luigi Majno is located in a densely populated residential area, its buildings are between 25 and 35 meters high, and have 4 (in the most ancient) to 10 storeys. Because of the urban development plan of 2004, Viale Luigi Majno and the surrounding areas can't be subject to invasive demolitions or edifications; new buildings erected since 2004 have had to comply with some very strict and precise building and aesthetic regulations. Viale Majno, as other areas in the city of Milan, is rich of modern buildings (built after the allied bombing during the Second World War) and some ancient ones (some of which were edified in the 15th century). Being North-South oriented, the ground level of Viale Majno is fully exposed to sunlight only during the central hours of the day: in summer from 10 a.m. to 5.30 p.m. and in winter from 11 a.m. to 3.30 p.m. During the rest of the day, the pavements and the roadways are in the shade of the surrounding buildings and of the trees in the middle of the way. Still, the intense car-flow keeps Viale Majno one of the warmest areas in winter and of the hottest in summer.

== Notable people who lived in Viale Luigi Majno ==
- Donatella Versace (vice-president and chief-designer of Versace)
- Umberto Veronesi (surgeon and oncologist)
- Franco Baresi (AC Milan player)
- Giovanni Cobolli Gigli (manager and businessman)
- Rosella Jardini (creative director of Moschino)
- Paolo Scaroni (former CEO of Eni and current President of AC Milan)
