= Avro Type F =

1912 aircraft by Avro

Type F
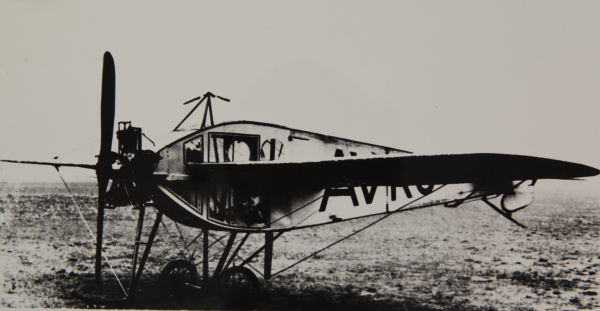

General information
- Type: Experimental aircraft
- Manufacturer: A.V.Roe and Company
- Number built: 1

History
- First flight: 1 May 1912

The Avro Type F was an early single seat British aircraft from Avro. On 1 May 1912 it became the first aircraft in the world to fly with a completely enclosed cabin for the pilot as an integral part of the design.

== Design and development ==
It was a wire-braced mid-wing monoplane with a tailskid undercarriage. The fuselage was teardrop-shaped with flat sides and cellon windows. Oil leakage from the engine had been anticipated to obscure pilot view by coating cabin windows; so two circular windows at the pilot's head level could be opened for the pilot's head to protrude when flying, but their use proved unnecessary. Ingress and egress was via a sheet-aluminum trapdoor in the fuselage top. The cabin was quite cramped, being only 2 ft (60 cm) across at its widest point.

The Type F made a few test flights in mid-1912 until damaged beyond repair in a hard landing on 13 September, after which it was not repaired. Its Viale 35 hp engine is on display at the Science Museum in London; and the rudder was preserved by the Royal Aero Club.

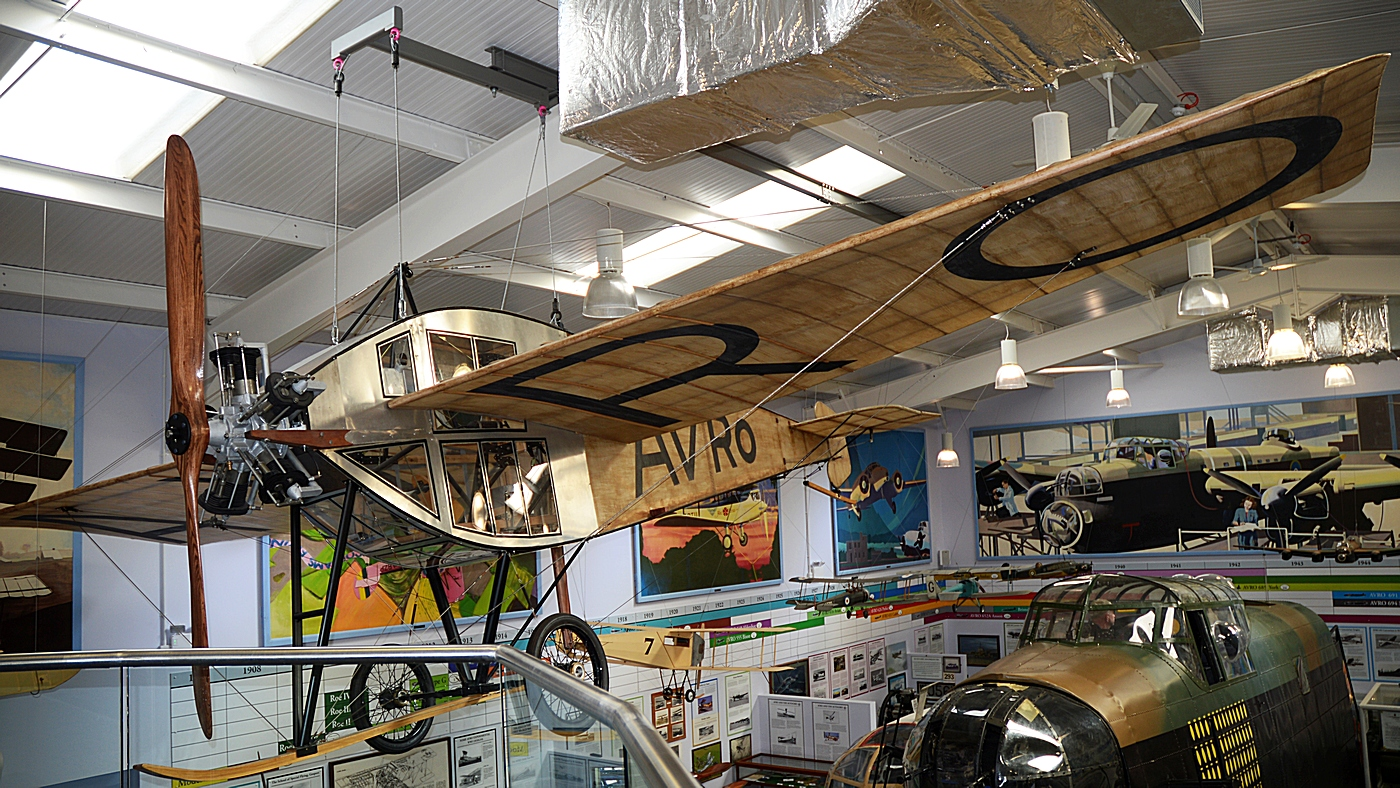
Replica of the Avro Type F displayed at the Avro Heritage Museum, Woodford, Manchester

A replica, BAPC.328. which was displayed at the Science and Industry Museum in Manchester is now displayed at the Avro Heritage Museum in Woodford, Greater Manchester.

== Specifications ==
Data from

General characteristics

- Crew: one pilot
- Length: 23 ft 0 in (7.01 m)
- Wingspan: 28 ft 0 in (8.53 m)
- Height: 7 ft 6 in (2.29 m)
- Wing area: 158 sq ft (14.7 m^{2})
- Empty weight: 550 lb (250 kg)
- Gross weight: 800 lb (360 kg)
- Powerplant: 1 × Viale 35 hp 5-cylinder radial , 35 hp (26 kW)

Performance

- Maximum speed: 65 mph (105 km/h, 56 kn)
- Rate of climb: 300 ft/min (1.5 m/s)
