= Esnault-Pelterie REP.1 =

R.E.P. 1
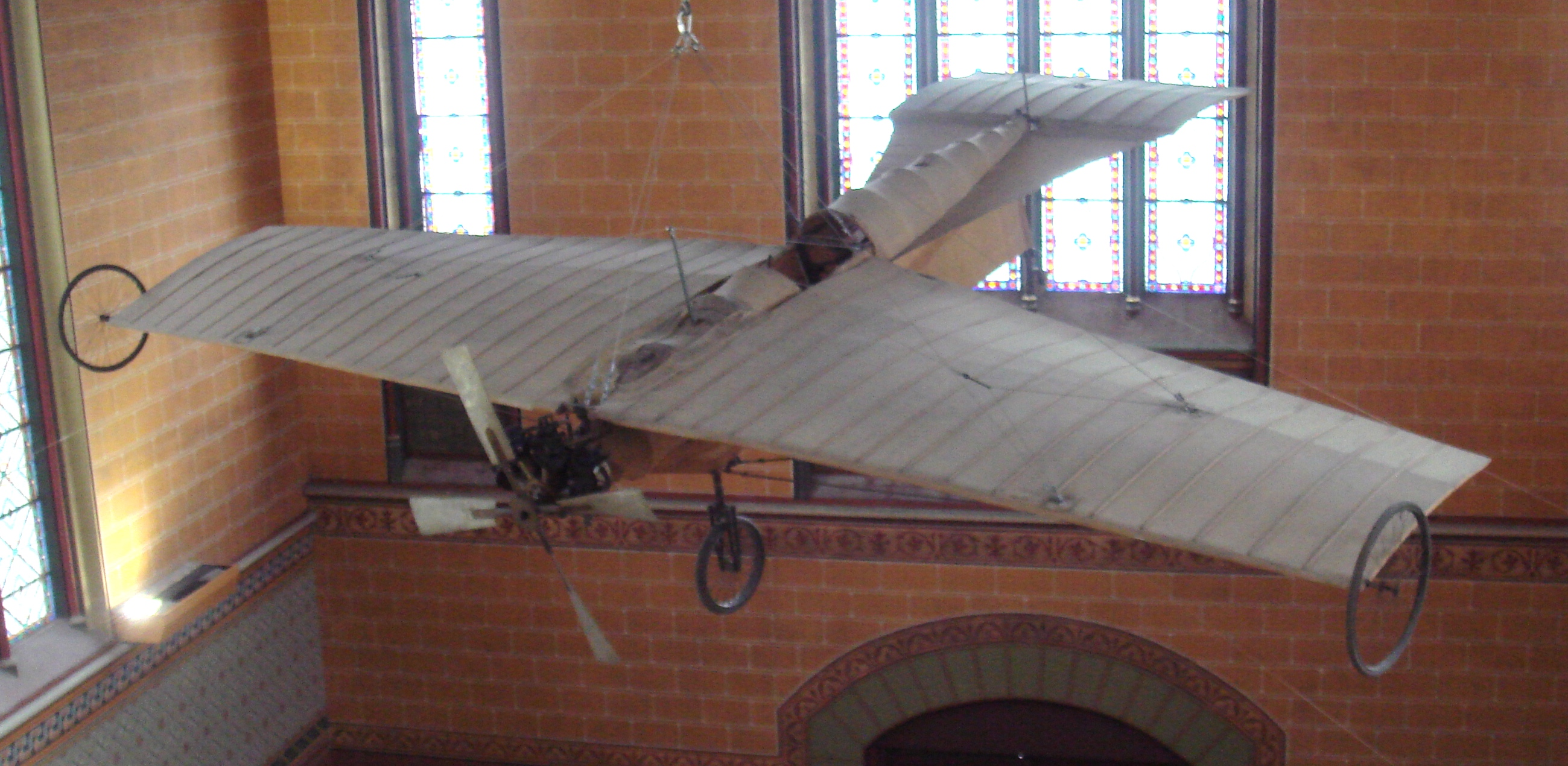
- R.E.P. 1 of 1906 preserved at the Musée des Arts et Métiers in Paris.

General information
- Type: Experimental aircraft
- Manufacturer: Robert Esnault-Pelterie
- Designer: Robert Esnault-Pelterie
- Number built: 2

History
- First flight: 19 October 1907

The Esnault-Pelterie R.E.P. 1 was an experimental aircraft built and flown in France in the early twentieth century by Robert Esnault-Pelterie. It was historically significant as the first to employ a joystick as its main flight control.

== Design and development ==
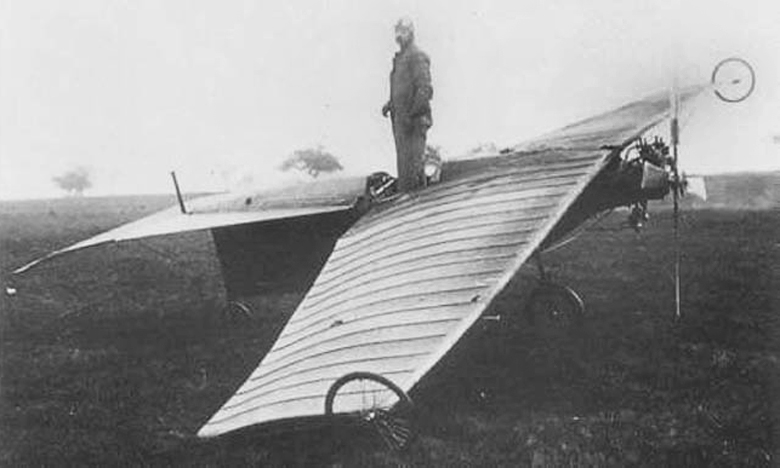
The R.E.P. 1 in 1907

The REP 1 was a single-seat tractor configuration monoplane powered by a 22 kW (30 hp) seven-cylinder two-row semi-radial engine driving a four-bladed propeller with aluminium blades rivetted to steel tubes. The fuselage was made largely of steel tubing covered in varnished silk and the wings of wood. An elongated triangular fixed horizontal stabiliser was mounted on top of the rear fuselage with a rectangular elevator mounted on the trailing edge, and a fixed fin and rudder were mounted under the fuselage. Lateral control was effected by wing-warping. The main landing gear consisted of a single centrally mounted wheel mounted on a pneumatic damper, with a small tailwheel mounted on the rudder. Large outrigger wheels were fitted to the tips of the wings, which featured marked anhedral. Esnault-Pelterie began testing the R.E.P. 1 in September 1907, initially flying the aircraft as a glider before attempting powered flights. Throughout October, these flights became increasingly successful.

The R.E.P. 1 is preserved at the Musée des Arts et Métiers in Paris.

== Specifications ==
Data from l'Aérophile, October 1907, pp. 290-1

General characteristics

- Crew: 1
- Length: 6.85 m (22 ft 6 in)
- Wingspan: 9.60 m (31 ft 6 in)
- Wing area: 18.0 m^{2} (194 sq ft)
- Empty weight: 230 kg (507 lb)
- Gross weight: 507 kg (1,118 lb)
- Powerplant: 1 × R.E.P. 7-cylinder two-row semi-radial piston engine , 22 kW (30 hp)

Performance

- Maximum speed: 60 km/h (37 mph, 32 kn)
