= Vales =

Vales or Valeš (feminine Valešová) is a surname. Notable people with the surname include:

- Erni Vales, American graffiti artist
- Ivana Valešová (born 1963), Czech alpine skier
- Jaison Vales (born 1988), Indian footballer
- Jiří Valeš, Czech canoeist
- José C. Vales (born 1965), Spanish writer
- Lenka Valešová (born 1985), Czech hammer thrower
- Marc Vales (born 1990), Andorran footballer
- Marcos Vales (born 1975), Spanish footballer
- Óscar Vales (born 1974), Spanish footballer
- Roman Valeš (born 1990), Czech footballer

== Fictional characters ==
- Vales family, characters in 11/11/11

== See also ==
- Fronteira dos Vales, a Brazilian municipality
- Vale (surname)
- Vales Mills, Ohio, a place in Ohio
- Vales Point Power Station, an Australian power station
