= Giovanna Viale =

Italian geneticist

- Born: 7 July 1949 (age 77)

Academic background
- Education: University of Genoa

Academic work
- Discipline: Genetics
- Sub-discipline: Medical genetics
- Institutions: University of Milan; CusMiBio

Giovanna Viale (born 7 July 1949) is an Italian geneticist who was a professor for medical genetics and director of the Centre of the University and High School of Milan for Bioscience education (CusMiBio).

== Life and career ==
In 1972, Viale received a degree in Biological Sciences at the University of Genoa. She completed a specialization degree in microbiology in 1976 and another in medical genetics in 1982. In 1978, she worked in the lab of Alan Munro during an EMBO short-term fellowship at the Department of Pathology, Division of Immunology of the University of Cambridge in the United Kingdom.

In 1985 and 1986, Viale received an EMBO long-term fellowship to work in the lab of P. Cazenave at the Unité de Immunochimie Analytique of the Institut Pasteur in Paris, France. In 1993, she worked at the lab of D. Vercelli at the Children's Hospital of the Harvard Medical School in Boston, Massachusetts. In 2000 and 2001 she held a position as a scientific writer/editor and internet specialist at the Office of the Scientific Director at the NIAID in Bethesda, Maryland. Viale held positions at the Institut für Molekulare Virologie of the Technical University of Munich, Germany, as a writer and editor of scientific materials in 2001 and 2002. In 2005 and 2006, Viale held lectures at the Institut de Formation et de Soins "Le Bon Samaritain" in N'Djamena, Chad, on the topics of cell biology and bioinformatics, respectively.

Since 2000, she has been an associate professor of general & applied biology at the University of Milan in the Department of Biology and Genetics for the Medical Sciences. In 2004, Viale was promoted to co-director of the Centre of the University and High School of Milan for Bioscience education (CusMiBio) and in 2016 she became the director of the CusMiBio.
