= REP Type D =

Two-seat sport aircraft produced in France in the early 1910s

Type D
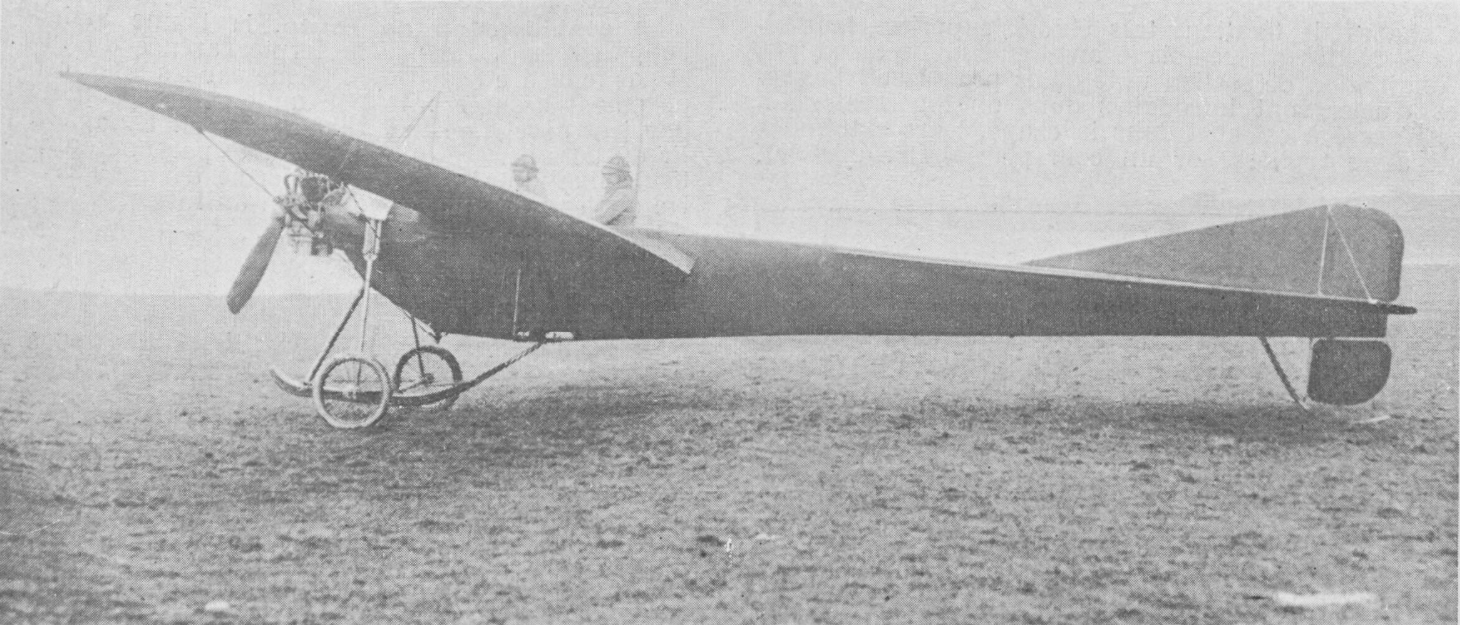

General information
- Type: Sport aircraft
- National origin: France
- Manufacturer: Robert Esnault-Pelterie

History
- First flight: 1910
- Developed from: REP Type B

The REP Type D was a sport aircraft designed and produced in France by Robert Esnault-Pelterie, beginning in 1910. Unlike his first designs, it was of conventional configuration, one of a family of related aircraft he produced around this time.

== Design ==
The two-seat Type D was very similar to the single-seat Type B built slightly earlier. It was a conventional, shoulder-wing monoplane which seated the pilot and a single passenger in tandem in an open cockpit. It had conventional tailskid undercarriage and was powered by a piston engine in the nose driving a tractor propeller. Lateral control was via wing-warping and the aircraft had dual controls. Unusually for the day, the fuselage and tail structure was of steel tube. The wing structure was wooden, and the entire aircraft was covered in fabric. The fuselage of some, but not all, had a diamond-, or lozenge-, shaped cross-section, while others shared the triangular cross-section of the Type B.

== Operational history ==
In December 1910, Type Ds set speed records for an aircraft carrying a passenger over 100 kilometres (62 mi) and 250 kilometres (160 mi). Another placed fifth in the 1911 Circuit of Europe in June the following year, but was the only monoplane to finish the entire course (competition rules allowed pilots to fly multiple aircraft during the event).

A Type D was exhibited at the 1911 Paris Aero Show.

One example, construction number 24 without its fabric covers, is preserved at the Musée de l'air et de l'espace ("Air and Space Museum") in Paris.

== Specifications ==
Data from Pouchet 1911, p.176

General characteristics

- Crew: 1 pilot
- Capacity: 1 passenger
- Length: 11 m (36 ft 1 in)
- Wingspan: 13.80 m (45 ft 3 in)
- Height: 3 m (9 ft 10 in)
- Wing area: 27 m^{2} (290 sq ft)
- Empty weight: 500 kg (1,102 lb)
- Gross weight: 700 kg (1,543 lb)
- Powerplant: 1 × REP air-cooled, five-cylinder, semi-radial (fan) engine, 45 kW (60 hp)

== Notes ==
=== Bibliography ===
- Devaux, Jean; Marani, Michel (April 1996). "Le mysterieux 'REP' Type D du musée de l'air et de l'espace" [The mysterious REP Type D of the Air and Space Museum]. Pégase : revue de l'association des amis du musée de l'air [Pegasus: magazine of the association of the friends of the Air Museum] (in French). No. 81. Paris: L'association des amis du musée de l'air. pp. 4–7.
- The Illustrated Encyclopedia of Aircraft. London: Aerospace Publishing.
- "Impressions at the third Paris Aero Salon". Flight. Vol. 3, no. 51. London: Flight. 23 December 1911. pp. 1110–14.
- Munson, Kenneth (1969). Pioneer Aircraft 1903–14. London: Blandford.
- "Paris Aero Show". Flight. Vol. 3, no. 52. London: Flight. 30 December 1911. pp. 1130–37.
- Opdycke, Leonard E. (1999). French Aeroplanes Before the Great War. Atglen PA: Schiffer.
- Pouchet, Paul (15 April 1911). "Les Aéroplanes REP et le moteur REP, 5 cylindres" [REP aeroplanes and the REP 5-cylinder engine]. L'Aérophile [The Aerophile] (in French). Vol. 19, no. 8. Paris: L'Aérophile. pp. 173–179.
