= REP Type N =

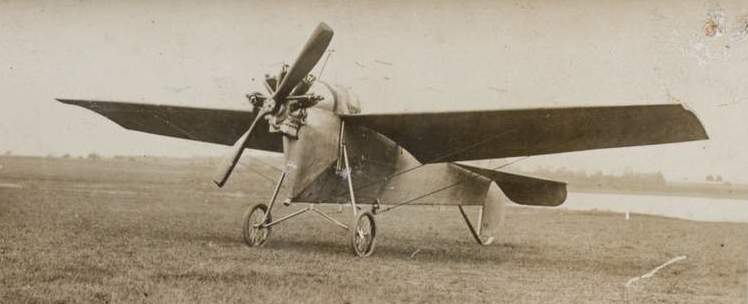

General information
- Type: Reconnaissance aircraft
- National origin: France
- Manufacturer: REP
- Primary user: Aéronautique Militaire

History
- First flight: 1912

The REP Type N was a military reconnaissance monoplane produced in France in 1914.

== Design and development ==
It was a wire-braced, mid-wing monoplane of conventional design with fixed, tailskid undercarriage. The fuselage was constructed of steel tube and was of triangular cross-section, with the apex on the ventral side. The pilot and observer sat in tandem, open cockpits. Lateral control was by wing warping.

== Operational history ==
The type was selected by the Aéronautique Militaire to equip two squadrons, REP 15 and REP 27. Type Ns from the former unit flew reconnaissance missions during the Battle of Charleroi in August 1914, and Type Ns from both units flew missions during the First Battle of the Marne in September. Intelligence provided by reconnaissance aircraft proved a decisive factor in the Allied victory at the Marne. In January 1915, the two units merged and were re-equipped with Caudron G.3s, but continued to operate the REP Type N at least as late as March.

The Type N also formed the backbone of the Ottoman Air Service in 1912, and these machines were used operationally during the First and Second Balkan War in 1912–13. At the outbreak of war, two Ottoman Type Ns were seized while in transit through Serbia, and were put into Serbian military service. They were soon joined by a third machine, captured from the Ottoman forces, but the Serbs seem to have made little use of the type. By October 1914, Ottoman Type Ns were relegated to training duties.

== Operators ==
France

- Aéronautique Militaire
  - Fifth Army
    - REP 15
  - Tenth Army
    - REP 27

Ottoman Empire

- Ottoman Air Service

Serbia

- Serbian Air Force

== Specifications (Two-seater) ==
Data from Davilla & Soltan 2002, p.432

General characteristics

- Crew: Two, pilot and observer
- Length: 6.60 m (21 ft 8 in)
- Wingspan: 9.20 m (30 ft 2 in)
- Empty weight: 270 kg (590 lb)
- Powerplant: 1 × Gnome rotary , 60 kW (80 hp)

Performance

- Maximum speed: 116 km/h (73 mph, 63 kn)

== See also ==
Aircraft of comparable role, configuration, and era

- Nieuport IV
- Bleriot XI
- Morane-Saulnier G
