= Válek =

Válek or Valek (feminine: Válková) is a Czech and Slovak surname. Notable people with the surname include:

- Erika Valek (born 1982), Colombian basketball player
- Jim Valek (1928–2005), American football player and coach
- Jitka Válková, Czech beauty pageant contestant
- Helena Válková (born 1951), Czech politician
- Kateřina Valková (born 1996), Czech volleyball player
- Miroslav Válek (1927–1991), Slovak poet, publicist and politician
- Vladimír Válek (1935–2025), Czech conductor
- Vlastimil Válek, Czech radiologist and politician
- Vlastimil Válek (motorcyclist) (1951–2022), Czech motocross racer
- Zdeněk Válek (born 1958), Czech footballer
