= Spirito Mario Viale =

Italian-British aviation engineer

Spirito Mario Viale (born 7 February 1882) was an Italian engineer. He was born in Turin, but did most of his important work in France and (in particular) the UK. He was an early manufacturer of aircraft engines, producing a series of 3-, 5-, and 7-cylinder radials from a workshop in Boulogne-sur-Seine from 1910 until the outbreak of World War I.

In 1919, he emigrated to the United Kingdom, where he went to work for Armstrong Siddeley before returning to Italy in the early 1930s to pursue landscape painting and worked with Isotta Fraschini for a time.

The rise of fascism drove him back to England, where he found work as chief designer of Rolls-Royce's armaments division. W. A. Robotham recalls him as a brilliant mathematician and talented designer; unfortunately in wartime with glasses and a pointed beard he looked like a foreign secret service agent from novels of the 1920s!

When these projects were abandoned, he returned to work on aero engines with Rolls-Royce until his retirement in 1947.

== See also ==
- Rolls-Royce 40mm Cannon
- Rolls-Royce Experimental Machine Gun
